= National Register of Historic Places listings in Kansas =

Kansas counties

There are over 1,600 buildings, sites, districts, and objects in Kansas listed on the National Register of Historic Places in Kansas. NRHP listings appear in 101 of the state's 105 counties.

Contents: Counties in Kansas (links in italic lead to a new page)
Allen - Anderson - Atchison - Barber - Barton - Bourbon - Brown - Butler - Chase - Chautauqua - Cherokee - Cheyenne - Clark - Clay - Cloud - Coffey - Comanche - Cowley - Crawford - Decatur - Dickinson - Doniphan - Douglas - Edwards - Elk - Ellis - Ellsworth - Finney - Ford - Franklin - Geary - Gove - Graham - Grant - Gray - Greeley - Greenwood - Hamilton - Harper - Harvey - Haskell - Hodgeman - Jackson - Jefferson - Jewell - Johnson - Kearny - Kingman - Kiowa - Labette - Lane - Leavenworth - Lincoln - Linn - Logan - Lyon - Marion - Marshall - McPherson - Meade - Miami - Mitchell - Montgomery - Morris - Morton - Nemaha - Neosho - Ness - Norton - Osage - Osborne - Ottawa - Pawnee - Phillips - Pottawatomie - Pratt - Rawlins - Reno - Republic - Rice - Riley - Rooks - Rush - Russell - Saline - Scott - Sedgwick - Seward - Shawnee - Sheridan - Sherman - Smith - Stafford - Stanton - Stevens - Sumner - Thomas - Trego - Wabaunsee - Wallace - Washington - Wichita - Wilson - Woodson - Wyandotte

This National Park Service list is complete through NPS recent listings posted November 13, 2026.

== Current listings by county ==
The following are approximate tallies of current listings by county. These counts are based on entries in the National Register Information Database as of April 24, 2008 and new weekly listings posted since then on the National Register of Historic Places website since that time. There are frequent additions to the listings and occasional delistings and the counts here are approximate and not official. New entries are added to the official Register on a weekly basis. Also, the counts in this table exclude boundary increase and decrease listings which modify the area covered by an existing property or district and which carry a separate National Register reference number. The numbers of NRHP listings in each county are documented by tables in each of the individual county list-articles.

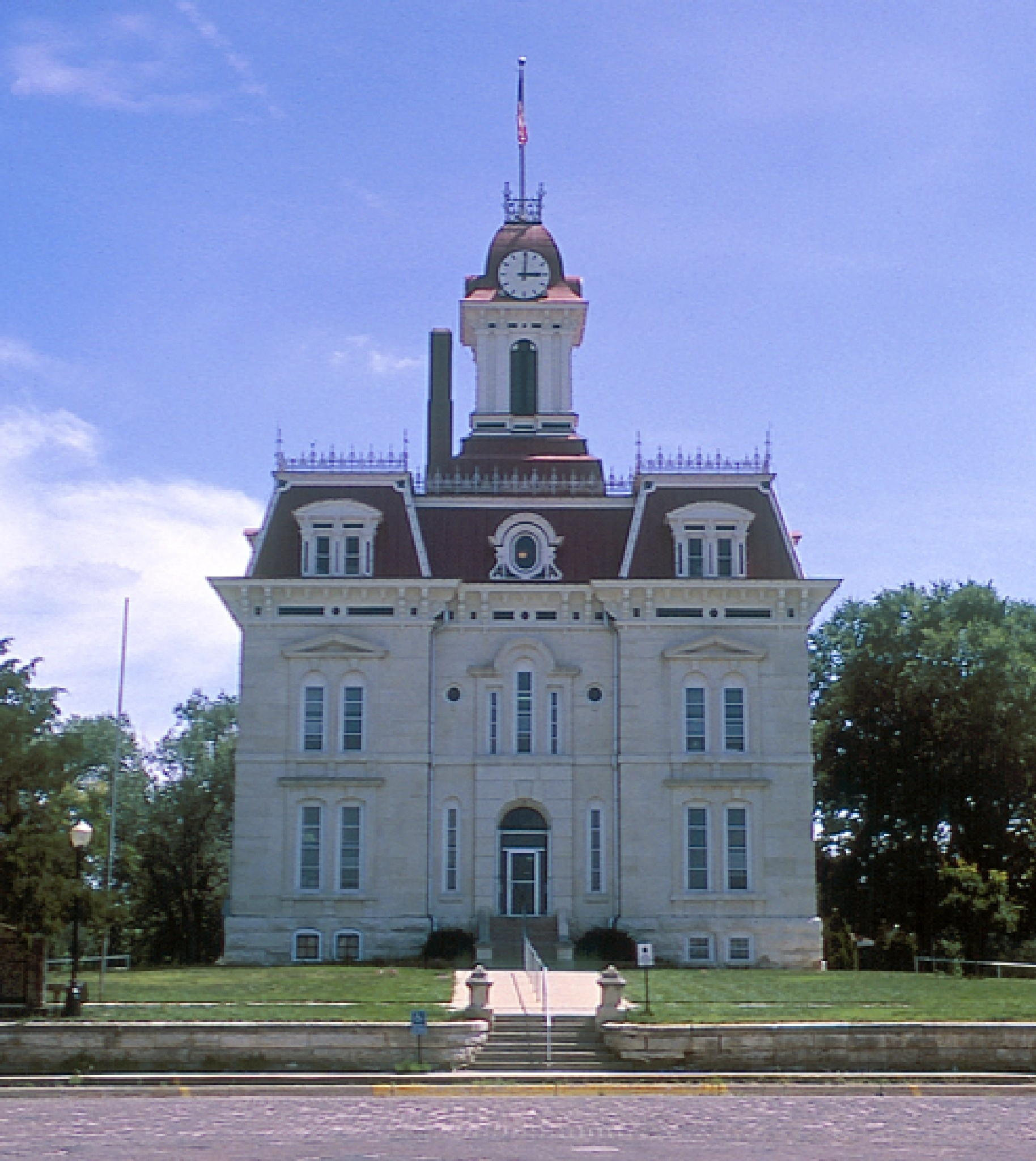
Chase County Courthouse

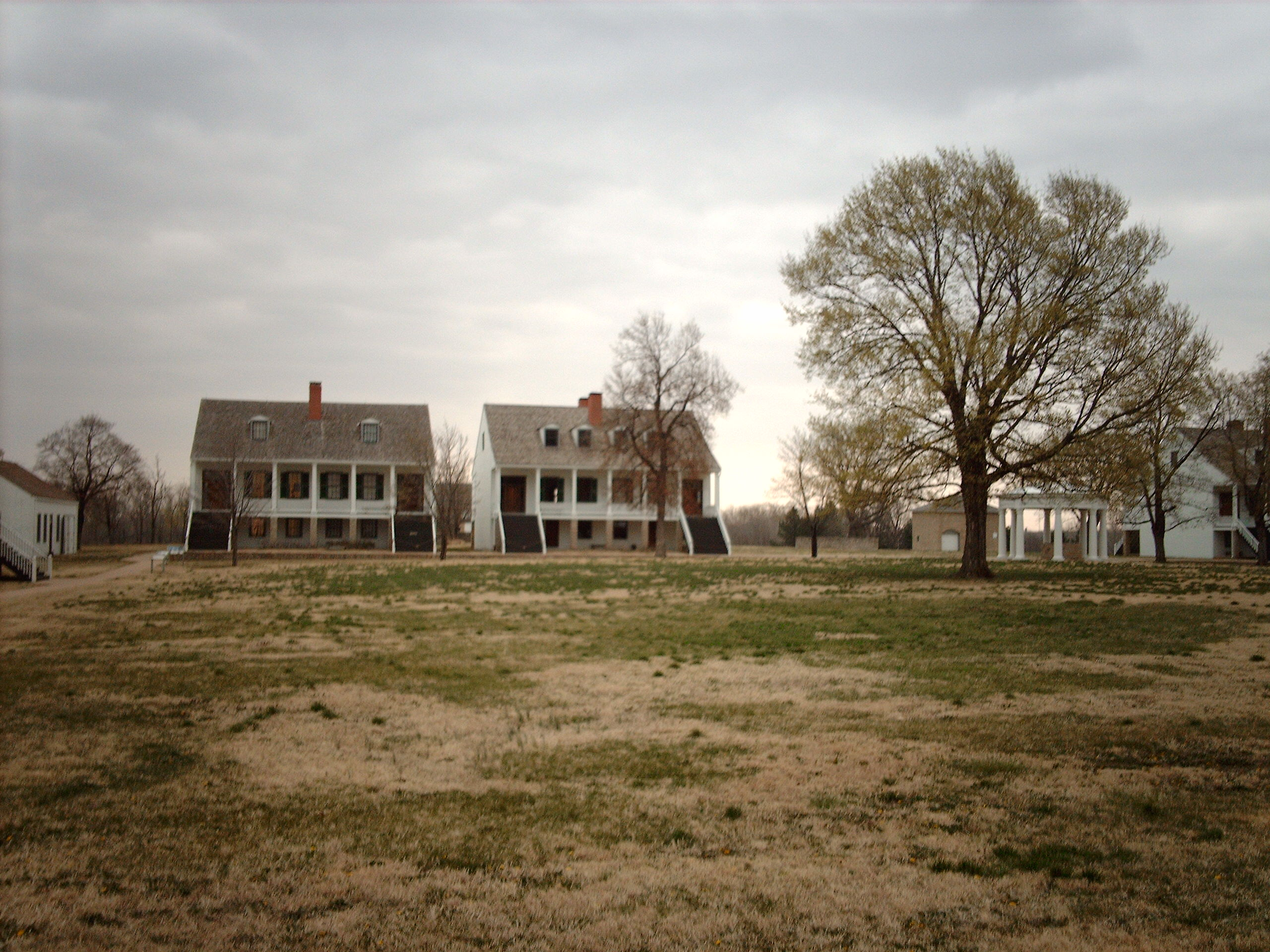
Fort Scott National Historic Site

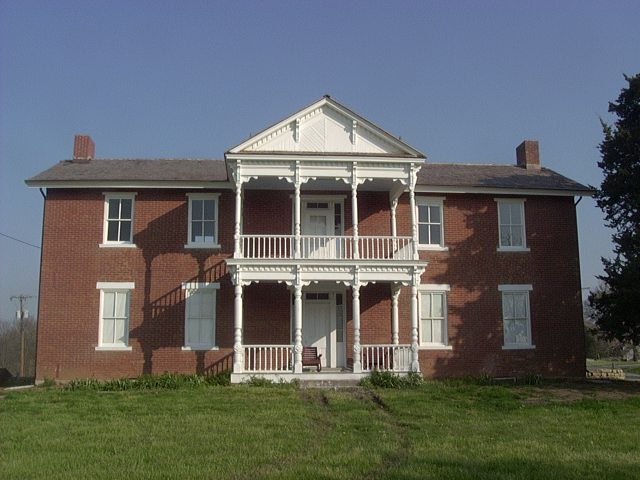
Grinter Place

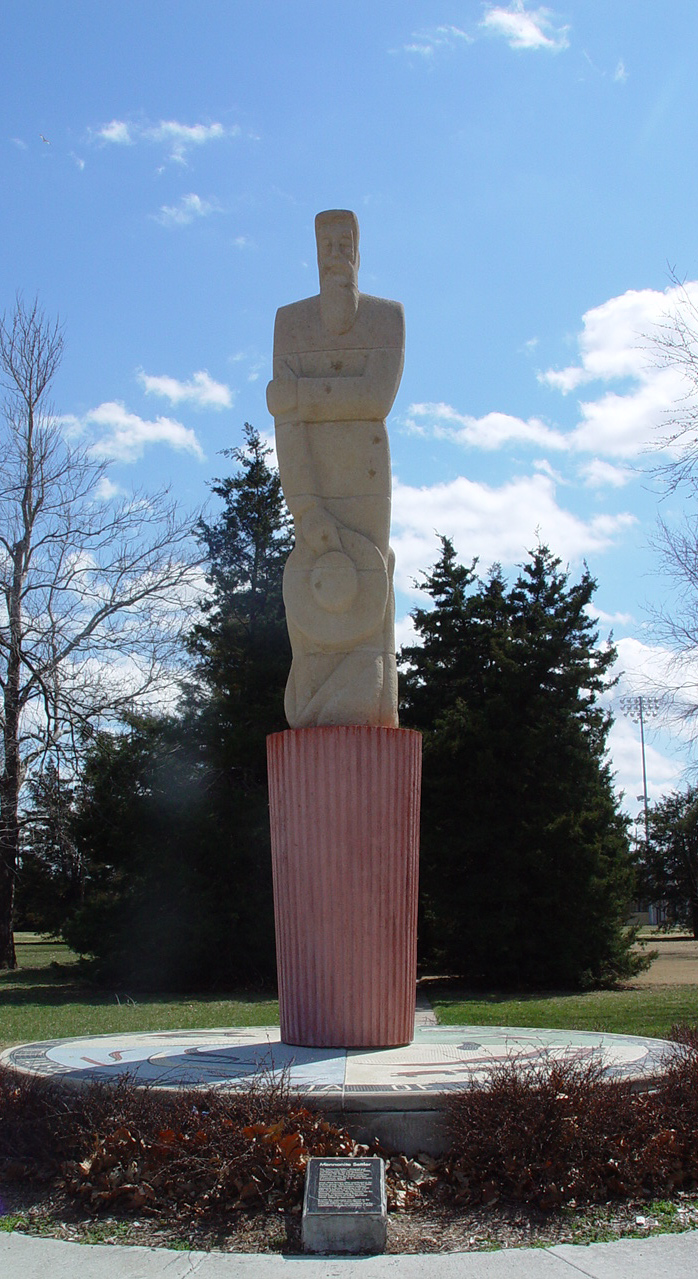
Mennonite Settler Statue

	County	# of Sites
1	Allen	6
2	Anderson	6
3	Atchison	52
4	Barber	2
5	Barton	20
6	Bourbon	14
7	Brown	17
8	Butler	27
9	Chase	20
10	Chautauqua	6
11	Cherokee	12
12	Cheyenne	3
13	Clark	7
14	Clay	5
15	Cloud	10
16	Coffey	6
17	Comanche	4
18	Cowley	27
19	Crawford	23
20	Decatur	2
21	Dickinson	47
22	Doniphan	36
23	Douglas	121
24	Edwards	3
25	Elk	7
26	Ellis	21
27	Ellsworth	22
28	Finney	11
29	Ford	16
30	Franklin	21
31	Geary	17
32	Gove	5
33	Graham	4
34	Grant	3
35	Gray	6
36	Greeley	1
37	Greenwood	16
38	Hamilton	3
39	Harper	9
40	Harvey	24
41	Haskell	0
42	Hodgeman	4
43	Jackson	7
44	Jefferson	10
45	Jewell	6
46	Johnson	36
47	Kearny	4
48	Kingman	8
49	Kiowa	5
50	Labette	14
51	Lane	3
52	Leavenworth	47
53	Lincoln	17
54	Linn	9
55	Logan	4
56	Lyon	20
57	Marion	32
58	Marshall	23
59	McPherson	27
60	Meade	3
61	Miami	20
62	Mitchell	13
63	Montgomery	37
64	Morris	28
65	Morton	7
66	Nemaha	12
67	Neosho	10
68	Ness	8
69	Norton	5
70	Osage	15
71	Osborne	7
72	Ottawa	2
73	Pawnee	9
74	Phillips	10
75	Pottawatomie	18
76	Pratt	9
77	Rawlins	3
78	Reno	22
79	Republic	13
80	Rice	15
81	Riley	45
82	Rooks	2
83	Rush	6
84	Russell	24
85	Saline	20
86	Scott	4
87	Sedgwick	146
88	Seward	1
89	Shawnee	110
90	Sheridan	2
91	Sherman	7
92	Smith	5
93	Stafford	9
94	Stanton	0
95	Stevens	0
96	Sumner	10
97	Thomas	4
98	Trego	8
99	Wabaunsee	20
100	Wallace	3
101	Washington	8
102	Wichita	2
103	Wilson	8
104	Woodson	4
105	Wyandotte	47
(duplicates)		(5)
Total:		1,695

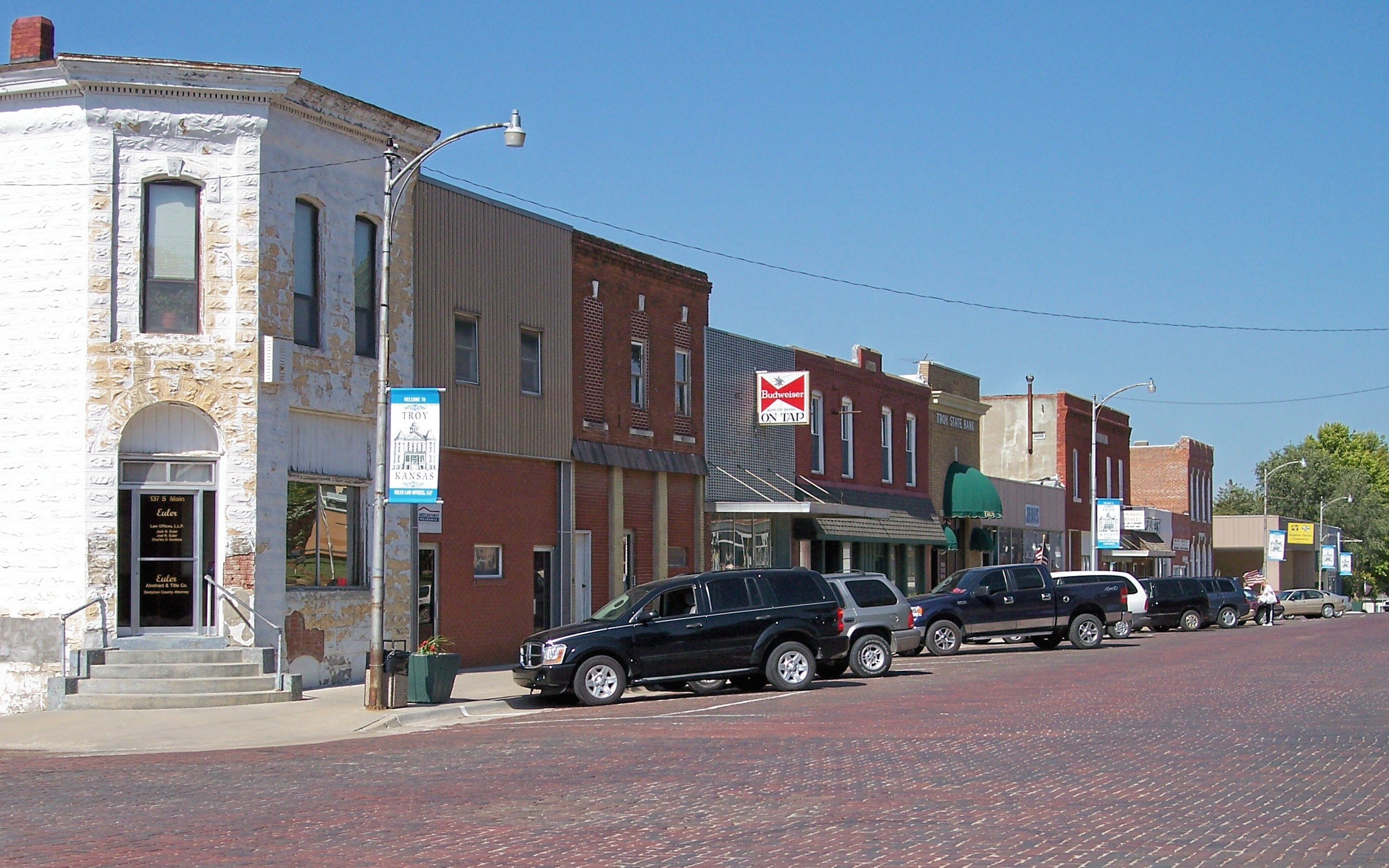
Doniphan County Courthouse Square Historic District

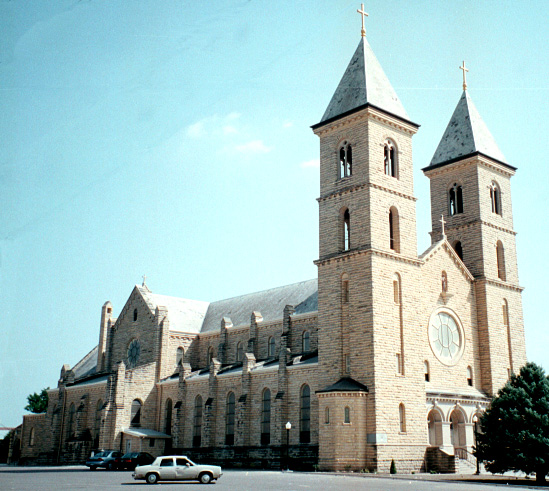
St. Fidelis Catholic Church

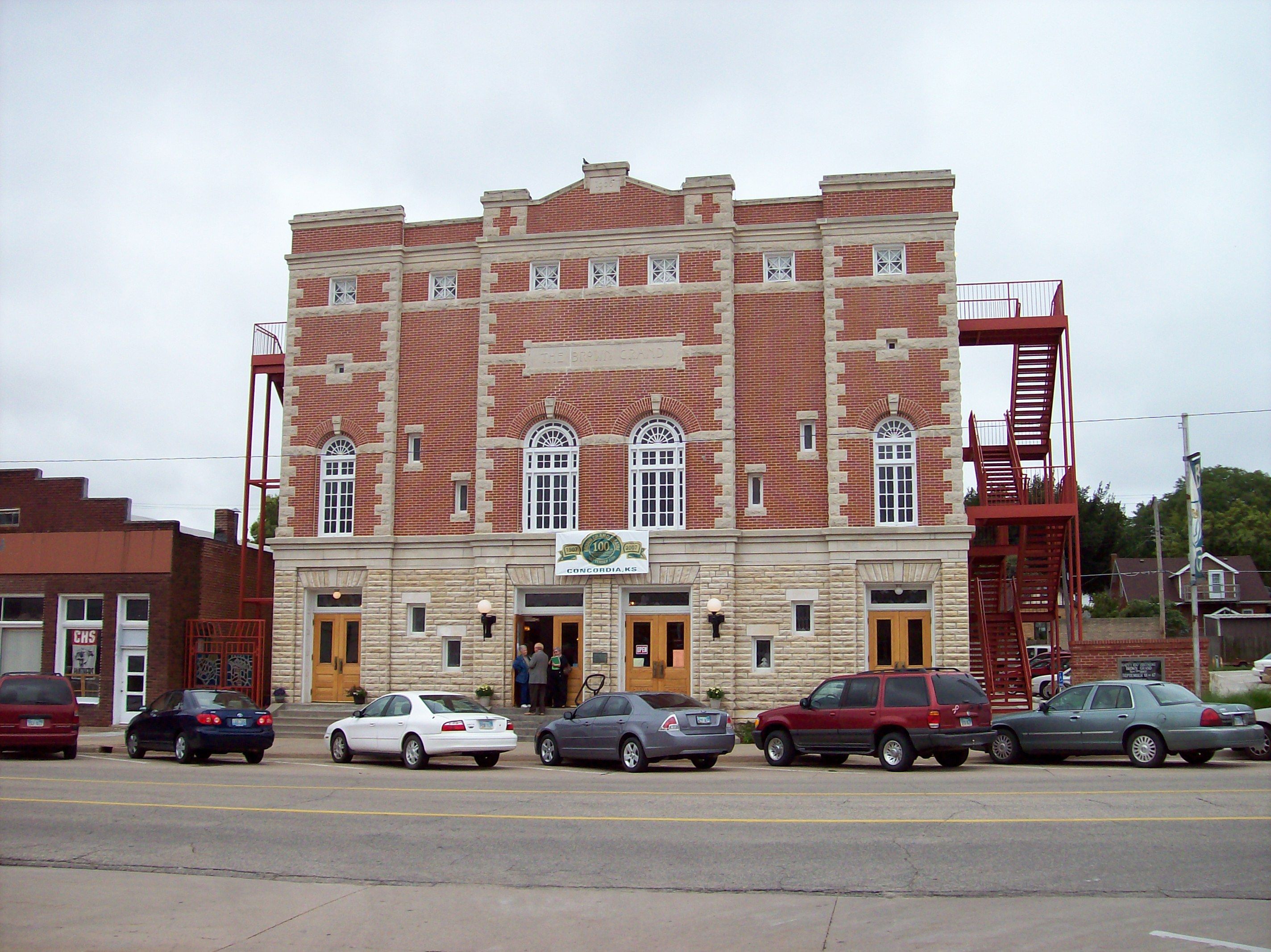
Brown Grand Theatre

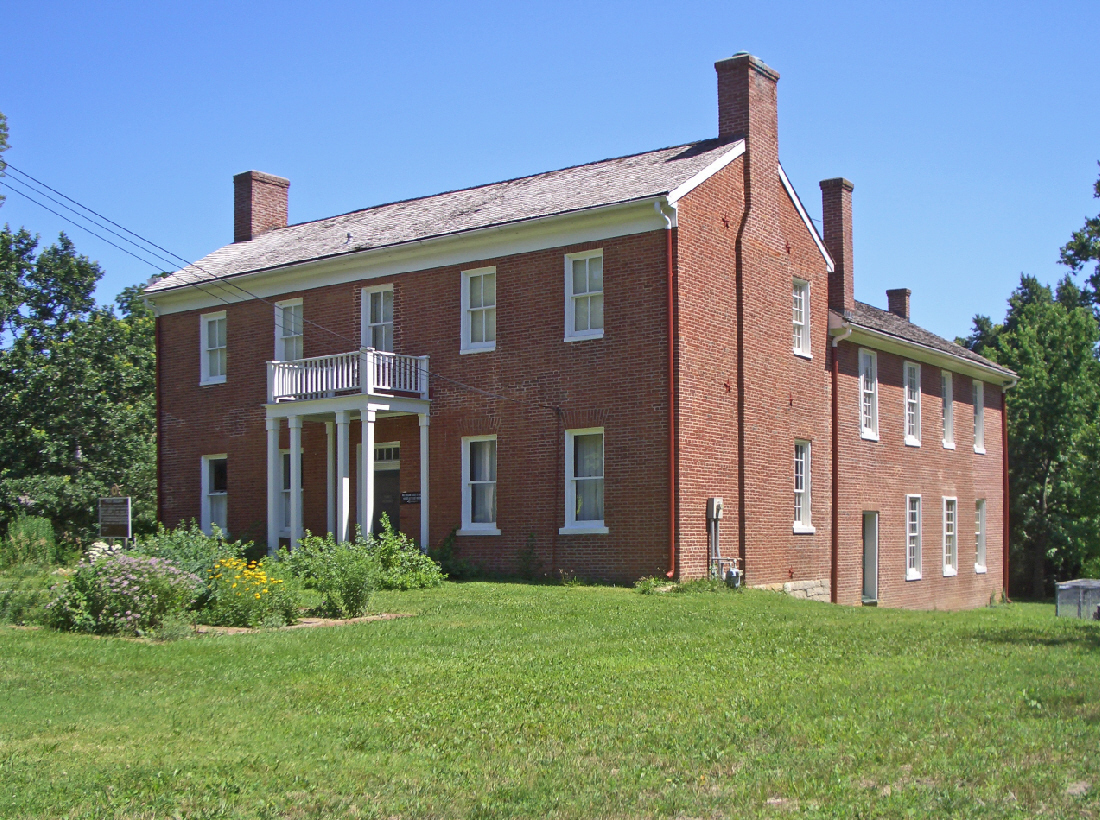
Shawnee Methodist Mission

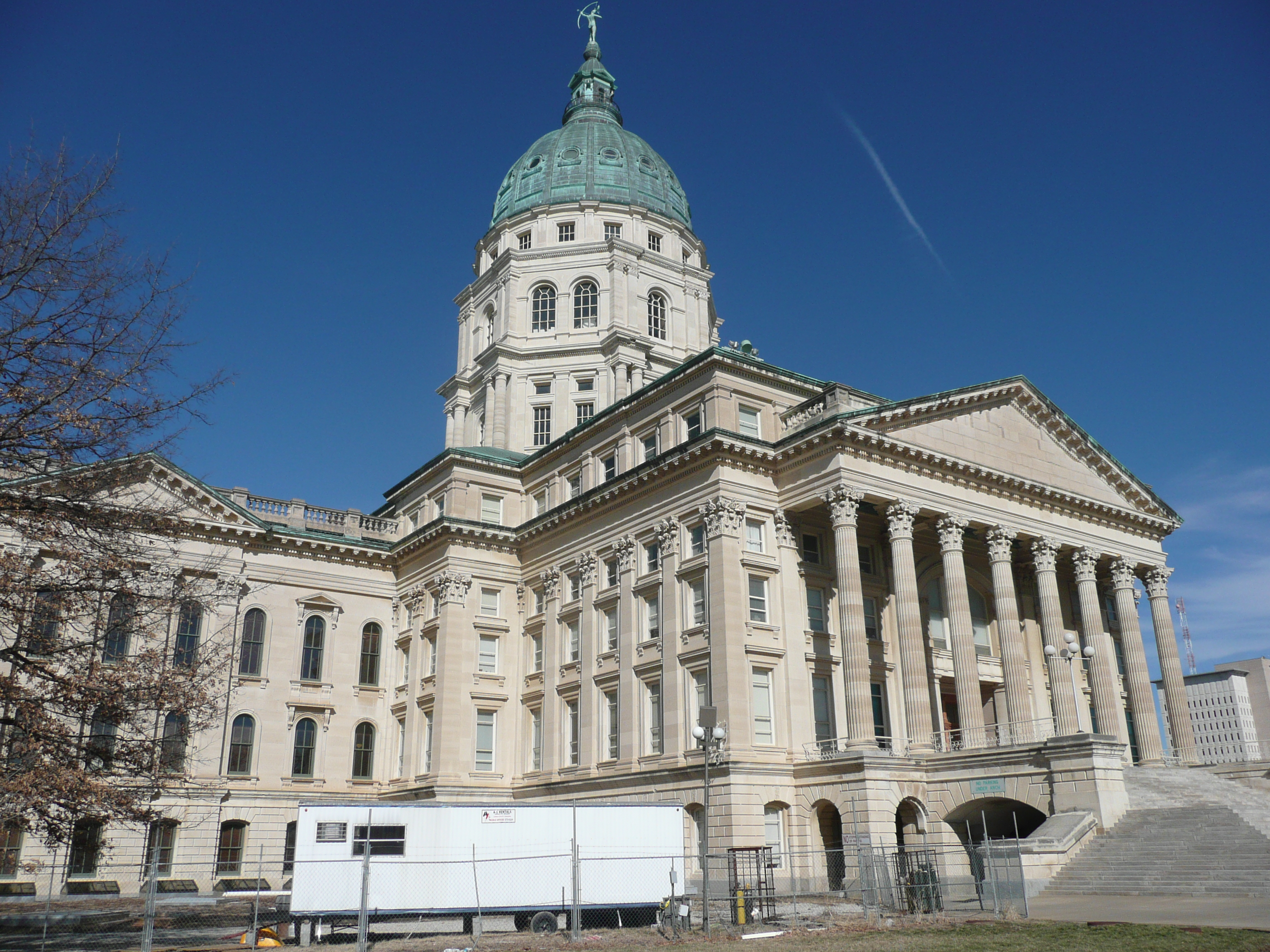
Kansas State Capitol

== Allen County ==
	Name on the Register	Image	Date listed	Location	City or town	Description
1	Allen County Jail	Allen County Jail	January 25, 1971 (#71000300)	204 N. Jefferson St. 37°55′24″N 95°24′10″W	Iola	
2	City Square Park Bandstand	City Square Park Bandstand	January 8, 2014 (#13001036)	100 S. 9th St. 37°48′39″N 95°26′10″W	Humboldt	
3	Iola Theatre		January 5, 2024 (#100009703)	202 South Washington Avenue; 37°55′15″N 95°24′20″W	Iola	
4	Kress Building (S.H. Kress & Company Store)		September 27, 2022 (#100008240)	9 South Jefferson St. 37°55′18″N 95°24′12″W	Iola	
5	Lander's Wagon and Carriage Shop	Lander's Wagon and Carriage Shop	January 11, 2017 (#100000494)	403 Bridge St. 37°48′40″N 95°26′31″W	Humboldt	
6	Northrup House	Northrup House	May 12, 1997 (#97000395)	318 East St. 37°55′21″N 95°24′01″W	Iola	

=== Former listing ===
	Name on the Register	Image	Date listed	Date removed	Location	City or town	Description
1	Funston Home		September 3, 1971 (#71000301)	April 21, 1995	14 South Washington; 37°55′19″N 95°24′21″W	Iola	Boyhood home of General Frederick Funston. Damaged during a storm in April, 1994. Delisted after being relocated into the town of Iola in July 1994.
2	Schleichers Branch Stone Arch Bridge		May 18, 1995 (#95000620)	February 25, 2004	Unnamed road over Slack Creek (Schleichers Branch), east of Humboldt	Humboldt	

== Anderson County ==
	Name on the Register	Image	Date listed	Location	City or town	Description
1	Anderson County Courthouse	Anderson County Courthouse	April 26, 1972 (#72000483)	4th and Oak Sts. 38°16′50″N 95°13′48″W	Garnett	
2	Cedar Creek Open Spandrel Bridge		September 29, 2026 (#100013458)	West 1300 Road; 38°12′47″N 95°20′48″W	Mont Ida vicinity	
3	Sennett and Bertha Kirk House	Sennett and Bertha Kirk House	November 2, 2005 (#05001199)	145 W. 4th Ave. 38°16′53″N 95°14′34″W	Garnett	
4	Shelley-Tipton House		May 6, 1982 (#82002650)	812 W. 4th St. 38°16′50″N 95°15′22″W	Garnett	
5	Spencer's Crossing Bridge	Spencer's Crossing Bridge	January 4, 1990 (#89002177)	Over Pottawatomie Creek, northwest of Greeley; 38°22′39″N 95°08′51″W	Greeley	
6	Samuel J. Tipton House		January 23, 1975 (#75000703)	4 miles southwest of Harris; 38°17′36″N 95°29′26″W	Harris	

== Barber County ==
	Name on the Register	Image	Date listed	Location	City or town	Description
1	Medicine Lodge Peace Treaty Site	Medicine Lodge Peace Treaty Site	August 4, 1969 (#69000059)	Southeast of Medicine Lodge; 37°17′41″N 98°33′42″W	Medicine Lodge	
2	Carry A. Nation House	Carry A. Nation House	March 24, 1971 (#71000303)	211 W. Fowler Ave. 37°16′32″N 98°34′55″W	Medicine Lodge	

== Chautauqua County ==
	Name on the Register	Image	Date listed	Location	City or town	Description
1	L.C. Adam Mercantile Building	L.C. Adam Mercantile Building	April 18, 2007 (#07000312)	618 Cedar St. 37°06′20″N 96°29′54″W	Cedar Vale	
2	Bradford Hotel	Bradford Hotel	November 28, 2007 (#07001222)	103 N. Chautauqua St. 37°07′37″N 96°11′13″W	Sedan	
3	Cedar Creek Bridge	Cedar Creek Bridge	March 10, 1983 (#83000418)	FAS 96; 37°00′34″N 96°15′20″W	Elgin	
4	Hewins Park Pavilion	Hewins Park Pavilion	June 27, 2007 (#07000602)	101 Salebarn Rd. 37°05′52″N 96°29′27″W	Cedar Vale	
5	Niotaze Methodist Episcopal Church	Niotaze Methodist Episcopal Church	January 11, 2006 (#05001512)	301 N. F St. 37°04′12″N 96°00′54″W	Niotaze	
6	Otter Creek Bridge	Otter Creek Bridge	January 4, 1990 (#89002189)	FAS 95 over Otter Creek, 3.0 miles north of Cedar Vale; 37°09′19″N 96°29′55″W	Cedar Vale	

== Cheyenne County ==
	Name on the Register	Image	Date listed	Location	City or town	Description
1	Cheyenne County Courthouse	Cheyenne County Courthouse	April 26, 2002 (#02000391)	212 E. Washington St. 39°46′28″N 101°47′57″W	St. Francis	
2	Henry Hickert Building	Henry Hickert Building	November 28, 2007 (#07001223)	104 West 4th 39°44′59″N 101°31′59″W	Bird City	
3	St. Francis City Park	St. Francis City Park	July 10, 2008 (#08000645)	300 block of E. Washington St. 39°46′29″N 101°47′54″W	St. Francis	

== Clark County ==
	Name on the Register	Image	Date listed	Location	City or town	Description
1	Ashland Grade School	Ashland Grade School	November 15, 2005 (#05001245)	210 W. 7th St. 37°11′23″N 99°46′04″W	Ashland	
2	Bear Creek Redoubt		March 30, 1978 (#78001275)	5 miles north of Ashland; 37°15′56″N 99°48′42″W	Center Township	
3	Cimarron Redoubt		May 23, 1978 (#78001276)	Along Redoubt Creek south of its confluence with the Cimarron River; 37°01′48″N 99°45′48″W	Center Township	
4	Girl Scout Little House	Girl Scout Little House	April 14, 2015 (#15000142)	448 W. 6th Ave. 37°11′27″N 99°46′18″W	Ashland	
5	Hodson Hotel	Hodson Hotel	September 30, 2019 (#100004456)	712 Main St. 37°11′21″N 99°45′57″W	Ashland	
6	Stein House	Stein House	March 2, 2001 (#01000182)	420 Cedar St. 37°11′31″N 99°45′51″W	Ashland	
7	Stockgrowers State Bank	Stockgrowers State Bank	April 26, 1972 (#72000490)	8th and Main Sts. 37°11′19″N 99°45′58″W	Ashland	

== Clay County ==
	Name on the Register	Image	Date listed	Location	City or town	Description
1	Auld Stone Barn	Auld Stone Barn	October 14, 2001 (#01001108)	255 Utah Rd., south of Wakefield; 39°09′27″N 96°59′54″W	Republican Township	
2	Clay Center Carnegie Library	Clay Center Carnegie Library	June 25, 1987 (#87000933)	706 6th St. 39°22′36″N 97°07′26″W	Clay Center	
3	Clay Center Downtown Historic District	Clay Center Downtown Historic District	October 30, 2020 (#100005716)	4th to 6th Sts., Court to Lincoln Aves. 39°22′38″N 97°07′35″W	Clay Center	
4	Clay County Courthouse	Clay County Courthouse	January 29, 1973 (#73000746)	5th and Court Sts. 39°22′36″N 97°07′31″W	Clay Center	
5	Mugler Lodge Site		March 1, 1994 (#94000069)	Southern bank of the Republican River, southeast of Clay Center; 39°21′20″N 97°09′41″W	Blaine Township	

== Coffey County ==
	Name on the Register	Image	Date listed	Location	City or town	Description
1	Burlington Carnegie Free Library	Burlington Carnegie Free Library	June 25, 1987 (#87000934)	201 N. 3rd 38°11′46″N 95°44′01″W	Burlington	
2	Cleo F. Miller House	Cleo F. Miller House	December 27, 1991 (#91001897)	Junction of Broadway and Coffey Sts. 38°24′56″N 95°51′44″W	Lebo	
3	Neosho River Bridge	Neosho River Bridge	March 10, 1983 (#83000420)	East of Hartford; 38°18′32″N 95°56′52″W	Hartford	Two-span Marsh rainbow arch bridge, built in 1926 over Neosho River
4	Plaza Theater	Plaza Theater	February 9, 2005 (#05000005)	404 Neosho St. 38°11′42″N 95°44′21″W	Burlington	Moderne theatre built in 1942
5	US Post Office-Burlington	US Post Office-Burlington	October 17, 1989 (#89001634)	118 S. 4th St. 38°11′39″N 95°44′09″W	Burlington	Incorrectly addressed previously as 107 S. 4th St.
6	Williamson Archeological Site		November 19, 1974 (#74000823)	Southern side of Eagle Creek above its confluence with the Neosho River, southeast of Hartford; 38°16′37″N 95°53′11″W	Pleasant Township	

== Comanche County ==
	Name on the Register	Image	Date listed	Location	City or town	Description
1	Archeological Site Number 14CM305		July 9, 1982 (#82004864)	Address restricted	Unknown	
2	Chief Theater	Chief Theater	February 9, 2005 (#05000010)	122 E. Main St. 37°16′19″N 99°19′39″W	Coldwater	
3	Comanche County Courthouse	Comanche County Courthouse	April 26, 2002 (#02000395)	201 S. New York Ave. 37°16′06″N 99°19′32″W	Coldwater	
4	Protection High School	Protection High School	November 15, 2005 (#05001244)	210 S. Jefferson; 37°12′00″N 99°28′52″W	Protection	

== Decatur County ==
	Name on the Register	Image	Date listed	Location	City or town	Description
1	Bank of Oberlin	Bank of Oberlin	December 1, 1994 (#94001418)	187 S. Penn; 39°49′09″N 100°31′45″W	Oberlin	
2	Norcatur City Hall	Norcatur City Hall	April 7, 2014 (#14000114)	107 N. Decatur Ave. 39°50′14″N 100°11′25″W	Norcatur	

== Edwards County ==
	Name on the Register	Image	Date listed	Location	City or town	Description
1	Gano Grain Elevator and Scale House	Gano Grain Elevator and Scale House	September 21, 1993 (#93000943)	Junction of U.S. Route 50 and County Road 9; 37°54′05″N 99°29′46″W	Kinsley	
2	Kinsley Civil War Monument	Kinsley Civil War Monument	January 31, 2008 (#07001479)	L Rd., Hillside Cemetery; 37°56′11″N 99°26′52″W	Kinsley	
3	Palace Theater	Palace Theater	February 9, 2005 (#05000006)	222 E. 6th St. 37°55′29″N 99°24′37″W	Kinsley	

== Elk County ==
	Name on the Register	Image	Date listed	Location	City or town	Description
1	Durbin Archeological Site		May 2, 1975 (#75000711)	Address restricted	Moline	
2	Elk County Courthouse	Elk County Courthouse	April 22, 2009 (#09000227)	127 N. Pine; 37°28′08″N 96°15′44″W	Howard	Two-story yellow/buff-brick courthouse built in 1907. Designed by George E. McDonald with elements of Richardsonian Romanesque and Italian Renaissance Revival style.
3	Elk Falls High School Gymnasium		January 5, 2024 (#100009705)	1014 Montgomery St. 37°22′25″N 96°11′39″W	Elk Falls	
4	Elk Falls Pratt Truss Bridge	Elk Falls Pratt Truss Bridge	May 6, 1994 (#94000403)	Off Montgomery St., across the Elk River; 37°22′27″N 96°11′02″W	Elk Falls	
5	Elk River Archeological District		September 13, 1978 (#78001279)	Address restricted	Elk City	
6	Grenola Mill and Elevator	Grenola Mill and Elevator	July 11, 2002 (#02000764)	Railroad Avenue; 37°20′54″N 96°26′58″W	Grenola	
7	Howard National Bank	Howard National Bank	December 22, 2020 (#100005948)	147-149 North Wabash St. (County appraiser states 143 North Wabash St.); 37°28′12″N 96°15′49″W	Howard	

== Gove County ==
	Name on the Register	Image	Date listed	Location	City or town	Description
1	Beamer Barn	Beamer Barn	July 8, 2010 (#10000452)	2931 CR 18; 39°06′40″N 100°44′27″W	Oakley	Agriculture-Related Resources of Kansas MPS
2	Benson Culvert	Benson Culvert	December 3, 2013 (#13000878)	6 mi. S. & 9 mi. W. of Gove; 38°52′25″N 100°39′22″W	Gove	Masonry Arch Bridges of Kansas Thematic Resource
3	Grainfield Opera House	Grainfield Opera House	November 28, 1980 (#80001467)	Main and 3rd Sts. 39°06′48″N 100°27′56″W	Grainfield	
4	Jenkins Culvert	Jenkins Culvert	December 3, 2013 (#13000879)	6 mi. S. & 11.3 mi. W. of Gove; 38°52′25″N 100°41′52″W	Gove	Masonry Arch Bridges of Kansas TR
5	Oxley Barn	Oxley Barn	April 16, 2008 (#08000303)	2740 County Road 74; 39°04′49″N 100°13′18″W	Quinter	

== Graham County ==
	Name on the Register	Image	Date listed	Location	City or town	Description
1	Antelope Lake Park	Antelope Lake Park	July 10, 2008 (#08000643)	2.5 miles west and 0.5 miles north of the junction of U.S. Route 24 and K-85; 39°22′15″N 100°06′55″W	Morland	
2	Harry Keith Barn	Harry Keith Barn	April 9, 2013 (#13000149)	M Rd. east of Ave. 200; 39°18′18″N 99°58′04″W	Penokee	Part of the Agriculture-Related Resources of Kansas MPS
3	Nicodemus Historic District, Nicodemus National Historic Site	Nicodemus Historic District, Nicodemus National Historic Site	January 7, 1976 (#76000820)	U.S. Route 24; 39°23′20″N 99°36′55″W	Nicodemus	
4	Penokee Stone Figure		June 23, 1982 (#82002660)	Address restricted	Penokee	

== Grant County ==
	Name on the Register	Image	Date listed	Location	City or town	Description
1	Grant County Courthouse District	Grant County Courthouse District	April 26, 2002 (#02000396)	108 S. Glenn St. 37°34′49″N 101°21′22″W	Ulysses	
2	Lower Cimarron Spring	Lower Cimarron Spring	October 15, 1966 (#66000344)	12 miles south of Ulysses on U.S. Route 270; W. side of US 270; 37°24′09″N 101°22′07″W	Ulysses	Boundary increase September 25, 2013
3	Santa Fe Trail-Grant County Segment 1		July 17, 2013 (#13000490)	Address Restricted	Ulysses	Santa Fe Trail Multiple Property Submission

== Gray County ==
	Name on the Register	Image	Date listed	Location	City or town	Description
1	Welborn 'Doc' Barton House	Welborn 'Doc' Barton House	January 7, 2010 (#09001204)	202 S. Edwards St. 37°49′34″N 100°27′15″W	Ingalls	
2	Cimarron City Jail	Cimarron City Jail	July 12, 2019 (#100004201)	East Ave. D 37°48′08″N 100°20′55″W	Cimarron	
3	Cimarron Hotel	Cimarron Hotel	February 10, 1983 (#83000428)	203 N. Main St. 37°48′29″N 100°20′54″W	Cimarron	
4	Old Gray County Courthouse	Old Gray County Courthouse	November 4, 2009 (#09000873)	117 S. Main St. 37°48′22″N 100°20′56″W	Cimarron	Location of the Battle of Cimarron in 1889.
5	Soule Canal-Gray County Segment 1	Soule Canal-Gray County Segment 1	October 15, 2014 (#14000857)	Between U.S. Routes 50/400 and Soule Ave. 37°49′18″N 100°26′18″W	Ingalls	
6	Soule Canal-Segment 2	Soule Canal-Segment 2	October 15, 2014 (#14000858)	Northern side of U.S. Routes 50/400; 37°49′00″N 100°25′28″W	Ingalls	

== Greeley County ==
	Name on the Register	Image	Date listed	Location	City or town	Description
1	Greeley County Courthouse	Greeley County Courthouse	July 12, 1976 (#76000821)	Harper and 3rd Sts. 38°28′17″N 101°45′00″W	Tribune	

== Hamilton County ==
	Name on the Register	Image	Date listed	Location	City or town	Description
1	Fort Aubrey Site		August 31, 1978 (#78001281)	Near Sand Creek, east of Syracuse; 37°59′10″N 101°40′15″W	Syracuse	
2	Menno Community Hall	Menno Community Hall	March 25, 2003 (#02001700)	NE4, NE4, NE4, NE4, S. 15, T. 26S, R. 49W; 37°47′39″N 101°33′52″W	Kendall	
3	Northrup Theater	Northrup Theater	February 9, 2005 (#05000008)	116 N. Main St. 37°59′03″N 101°45′08″W	Syracuse	

== Haskell County ==
There are no sites listed on the National Register of Historic Places in Haskell County.

== Hodgeman County ==
	Name on the Register	Image	Date listed	Location	City or town	Description
1	Hackberry Creek Bridge	Hackberry Creek Bridge	July 2, 1985 (#85001424)	13 miles west and 11 miles north of Jetmore; 38°14′14″N 100°08′09″W	Jetmore	
2	T. S. Haun House	T. S. Haun House	January 18, 1973 (#73000759)	Main St. 38°05′06″N 99°53′39″W	Jetmore	Part of the Haun Museum
3	Hodgeman County Courthouse	Hodgeman County Courthouse	May 2, 2002 (#02000429)	500 Main St. 38°05′03″N 99°53′33″W	Jetmore	
4	St. Mary's Catholic Church	St. Mary's Catholic Church	April 14, 2015 (#15000144)	14920 SE. 232 Rd. 37°59′07″N 99°38′33″W	Kinsley vicinity	

== Jackson County ==
	Name on the Register	Image	Date listed	Location	City or town	Description
1	Booth Site		October 2, 1992 (#92001322)	Address restricted	Mayetta	
2	Delia State Bank	Delia State Bank	February 3, 2020 (#100004924)	501 Washington Ave. 39°14′28″N 95°58′02″W	Delia	
3	Harris Site		June 23, 1978 (#78001283)	Address restricted	Soldier	
4	Holton Bath House	Holton Bath House	May 21, 2009 (#09000351)	711 Nebraska Ave. 39°27′53″N 95°44′31″W	Holton	
5	Hotel Josephine	Hotel Josephine	May 6, 2024 (#100010299)	501 Ohio Avenue; 39°27′54″N 95°44′00″W	Holton	
6	McFadden House	McFadden House	March 2, 2001 (#01000187)	315 W. 5th St. 39°27′53″N 95°44′11″W	Holton	
7	State Bank of Holton	State Bank of Holton	November 9, 1977 (#77000581)	4th and Pennsylvania Ave. 39°27′48″N 95°44′05″W	Holton	

=== Former listing ===
	Name on the Register	Image	Date listed	Date removed	Location	City or town	Description
1	Shedd and Marshall Store		November 25, 1977 (#77000582)	October 7, 2009	3rd and Whiting Sts. 39°35′20″N 95°36′44″W	Whiting	Demolished September 2008-May 2009.

== Jefferson County ==
	Name on the Register	Image	Date listed	Location	City or town	Description
1	Buck Creek School	Buck Creek School	December 27, 1988 (#88002830)	Off U.S. Route 24, 2 miles east of Williamstown; 39°04′04″N 95°17′41″W	Perry	
2	Delaware River Composite Truss Bridge	Delaware River Composite Truss Bridge	May 9, 2003 (#03000371)	Coal Creek Rd., 0.1 miles south of intersection with 170th Rd. 39°21′03″N 95°27′17″W	Valley Falls	
3	Delaware River Parker Truss Bridge	Delaware River Parker Truss Bridge	May 9, 2003 (#03000372)	Bridge St., 0.3 miles west of intersection with Main St. 39°04′30″N 95°24′10″W	Perry	
4	Morris Harris Farmstead	Morris Harris Farmstead	July 26, 2023 (#100009181)	16010 US 24; 39°03′07″N 95°17′06″W	Perry vicinity	
5	Jefferson Old Town Bowstring Truss	Jefferson Old Town Bowstring Truss	January 4, 1990 (#89002186)	Off U.S. Route 59; 39°12′48″N 95°18′31″W	Oskaloosa	
6	Maplecroft Farmstead	Maplecroft Farmstead	October 4, 2017 (#100001702)	2957 KOA Rd. 39°05′58″N 95°33′32″W	Grantville vicinity	
7	Methodist Episcopal Church of Oskaloosa	Methodist Episcopal Church of Oskaloosa	March 28, 2025 (#100011579)	402 Liberty Street; 39°13′03″N 95°18′52″W	Oskaloosa	
8	Newell-Johnson-Searle House	Newell-Johnson-Searle House	July 10, 2017 (#100001289)	609 Walnut St. 39°12′53″N 95°18′38″W	Oskaloosa	
9	Sunnyside School	Sunnyside School	January 18, 2011 (#10001139)	1121 Republic Rd. 39°03′45″N 95°15′09″W	Sarcoxie Township	Public Schools of Kansas MPS
9	Union Block	Union Block	April 23, 1973 (#73000760)	Southwestern corner of Delaware and Jefferson Sts. 39°12′55″N 95°18′47″W	Oskaloosa	

== Jewell County ==
	Name on the Register	Image	Date listed	Location	City or town	Description
1	Burr Oak School	Burr Oak School	November 6, 2005 (#05001201)	776 Kansas; 39°52′10″N 98°18′16″W	Burr Oak	
2	Burr Oak United Methodist Church	Burr Oak United Methodist Church	November 28, 2007 (#07001225)	Northeastern corner of Pennsylvania & Washington Sts. 39°52′09″N 98°18′12″W	Burr Oak	
3	First National Bank	First National Bank	June 16, 1976 (#76000823)	Commercial and Jefferson Sts., northwest corner 39°47′13″N 98°12′37″W	Mankato	
4	O.W. Francis House	O.W. Francis House	February 4, 2000 (#00000036)	Kansas Hwy 128, 1/2 mile north of Burr Oak; 39°52′51″N 98°18′20″W	Burr Oak	
5	Jewell County Courthouse	Jewell County Courthouse	April 26, 2002 (#02000397)	307 N. Commercial St. 39°47′18″N 98°12′37″W	Mankato	
6	Jewell County Jail	Jewell County Jail	May 12, 1995 (#95000511)	Center and Madison, southwest corner 39°47′16″N 98°12′32″W	Mankato	

== Kearny County ==
	Name on the Register	Image	Date listed	Location	City or town	Description
1	Deerfield State Bank	Deerfield State Bank	June 29, 2018 (#100002625)	602 Main St. 37°58′47″N 101°08′00″W	Deerfield	
2	Deerfield Texaco Service Station	Deerfield Texaco Service Station	June 27, 2007 (#07000603)	105 W. 6th. 37°58′47″N 101°08′03″W	Deerfield	
3	Indian Mound	Indian Mound	July 17, 2013 (#13000491)	N. side of N. River Rd. 37°53′43″N 101°20′21″W	Lakin	Santa Fe Trail Multiple Property Submission
4	Santa Fe Trail-Kearny County Segment 1	Santa Fe Trail-Kearny County Segment 1	July 17, 2013 (#13000492)	3 mi. W of Deerfield on north side of US 50; 37°58′28″N 101°10′59″W	Deerfield	Santa Fe Trail Multiple Property Submission

== Kiowa County ==
	Name on the Register	Image	Date listed	Location	City or town	Description
1	Archeological Site Number 14KW301		July 9, 1982 (#82004881)	Address restricted	Coldwater	
2	Archeological Site Number 14KW302		July 9, 1982 (#82004897)	Address restricted	Greensburg	
3	Fromme-Birney Round Barn	Fromme-Birney Round Barn	July 16, 1987 (#87001253)	Southwest of Mullinville; 37°31′36″N 99°30′30″W	Mullinville	
4	Greensburg Well	Greensburg Well	February 23, 1972 (#72000507)	Sycamore St. 37°36′20″N 99°17′37″W	Greensburg	Building housing the well was destroyed in a 2007 tornado
5	S.D. Robinett Building	S.D. Robinett Building	February 17, 2009 (#09000029)	148 S. Main; 37°36′20″N 99°17′34″W	Greensburg	Only building in the business district to survive the 2007 tornado

=== Former listing ===
	Name on the Register	Image	Date listed	Date removed	Location	City or town	Description
1	Belvidere Medicine River Bridge		July 2, 1985 (#85001418)	June 14, 2000	0.25 miles north of Belvidere	Belvidere	Replaced in 2000.

== Lane County ==
	Name on the Register	Image	Date listed	Location	City or town	Description
1	Lane County Community High School	Lane County Community High School	September 6, 2005 (#05000978)	200 S. Wichita Ave. 38°28′50″N 100°27′40″W	Dighton	
2	Pottorff Site		March 8, 1978 (#78001284)	Address restricted	Healy	
3	Alexander & Anna Schwartz Farm	Alexander & Anna Schwartz Farm	October 8, 2014 (#14000829)	57 E. Rd. 70; 38°21′57″N 100°21′33″W	Dighton	

== Logan County ==
	Name on the Register	Image	Date listed	Location	City or town	Description
1	Bertrand House		April 7, 2025 (#100011614)	Section 8, Township 12 South, Range 33 West; 39°01′06″N 101°00′27″W	Oakley	
2	Oakley High School Stadium	Oakley High School Stadium	April 9, 2013 (#13000150)	118 W. 7th St. 39°07′56″N 100°51′22″W	Oakley	Part of the New Deal-Era Resources of Kansas MPS
3	Old Logan County Courthouse	Old Logan County Courthouse	February 23, 1972 (#72000511)	Main St. 38°54′45″N 101°10′50″W	Russell Springs	Now the Butterfield Trail Museum
4	Winona Consolidated School	Winona Consolidated School	September 6, 2005 (#05000975)	Junction of Wilson and 5th St. 39°03′50″N 101°14′46″W	Winona	

== Meade County ==
	Name on the Register	Image	Date listed	Location	City or town	Description
1	Dalton Gang Hideout and Museum	Dalton Gang Hideout and Museum	January 7, 2015 (#14001121)	502 S. Pearlette St. 37°16′52″N 100°20′14″W	Meade	
2	Fowler Swimming Pool and Bathhouse	Fowler Swimming Pool and Bathhouse	February 17, 2009 (#09000030)	308 E. 6th 37°23′00″N 100°11′31″W	Fowler	
3	Hotel Bunyan		August 12, 2025 (#100012120)	211 Main Street; 37°22′47″N 100°11′44″W	Fowler	

== Norton County ==
	Name on the Register	Image	Date listed	Location	City or town	Description
1	Barbeau House	Barbeau House	July 14, 2004 (#04000684)	210 E. Washington Ave. 39°36′39″N 100°00′01″W	Lenora	
2	North Fork Solomon River Lattice Truss Bridge	North Fork Solomon River Lattice Truss Bridge	May 9, 2003 (#03000366)	Prairie Dog Golf Course; 39°49′06″N 99°52′36″W	Norton	
3	Norton Downtown Historic District	Norton Downtown Historic District	January 18, 2011 (#10001144)	Generally bounded by E. Lincoln St., S. 1st St., E. Penn St., and S. Norton Ave. 39°49′44″N 99°53′20″W	Norton	
4	Sand Creek Truss Leg Bedstead Bridge	Sand Creek Truss Leg Bedstead Bridge	May 9, 2003 (#03000365)	Larrick Park; 39°36′56″N 99°59′57″W	Lenora	Apparently replaced by a beam bridge in 2010. Originally located at Rd. Y, 0.5 miles west of intersection with U.S. Highway 283, 2 miles north of K-9 and 6 miles northeast of Lenora
5	West Sappa Creek Lattice		January 4, 1990 (#89002191)	Northwest of Norton over West Sappa Creek; 39°59′13″N 100°05′54″W	Norton	

== Ottawa County ==
	Name on the Register	Image	Date listed	Location	City or town	Description
1	Archeological Site Number 14OT4		July 9, 1982 (#82004865)	Address restricted	Minneapolis	
2	Minneapolis Archeological Site		June 2, 1972 (#72000520)	3 miles (4.8 km) south of Minneapolis, between the Solomon River and Salt Creek; 39°05′06″N 97°41′56″W	Minneapolis	Premier site of its phase, the Smoky Hill Phase

== Rawlins County ==
	Name on the Register	Image	Date listed	Location	City or town	Description
1	Minor Sod House	Minor Sod House	January 5, 2005 (#04001428)	SW 1/4, SW1/4, NW 1/4, SW 1/4, S.20, T.5S, R. 36W; 39°36′05″N 101°23′39″W	McDonald	
2	Sappa Creek Massacre Site		January 28, 2021 (#100006060)	Address Restricted	Atwood vicinity	
3	Shirley Opera House	Shirley Opera House	January 16, 2007 (#06001241)	503 Main St. 39°48′28″N 101°02′26″W	Atwood	

== Rooks County ==
	Name on the Register	Image	Date listed	Location	City or town	Description
1	Rooks County Courthouse	Rooks County Courthouse	April 26, 2002 (#02000400)	115 N. Walnut St. 39°26′15″N 99°16′27″W	Stockton	
2	St. Joseph Catholic Church	St. Joseph Catholic Church	November 5, 2005 (#05001203)	105 N. Oak St. 39°19′07″N 99°35′11″W	Damar	

=== Former listing ===
	Name on the Register	Image	Date listed	Date removed	Location	City or town	Description
1	Rooks County Record Building	Rooks County Record Building	June 10, 2005 (#05000555)	March 27, 2017	501 Main; 39°26′11″N 99°16′25″W	Stockton	Demolished in December, 2013
2	Thomas Barn		September 6, 1991 (#91001104)	February 25, 2004	Northeast of Woodston, near the Osborne County line	Woodston	Destroyed by fire on May 23, 1995.

== Rush County ==
	Name on the Register	Image	Date listed	Location	City or town	Description
1	Lone Star School, District 64	Lone Star School, District 64	January 22, 2009 (#08001352)	Rural route, 1.25 miles (2.01 km) west of Bison Ave. M. 38°31′25″N 99°13′18″W	Bison	
2	Miller Farmstead	Miller Farmstead	October 17, 2012 (#12000869)	2913 KS 4; 38°32′19″N 99°13′58″W	La Crosse	Established east of La Crosse in 1881
3	Rush County Courthouse	Rush County Courthouse	April 13, 1972 (#72000524)	715 Elm St. 38°31′49″N 99°18′41″W	La Crosse	
4	St. Joseph's Catholic Church, Rectory, and School		June 22, 2026 (#100013144)	202 Main Street; 38°39′14″N 99°19′08″W	Liebenthal	
5	Sand Creek Tributary Stone Arch Bridge	Sand Creek Tributary Stone Arch Bridge	April 7, 2014 (#14000120)	2 miles (3.2 km) W, 1.4 miles (2.3 km) N. of La Crosse; 38°33′36″N 99°20′49″W	La Crosse	
6	Walnut Creek Tributary Bridge	Walnut Creek Tributary Bridge	July 2, 1985 (#85001435)	0.5 miles (0.80 km) north and 2.5 miles (4.0 km) west of Nekoma; 38°28′49″N 99°29′10″W	Nekoma	Apparently no longer extant

=== Former listing ===
	Name on the Register	Image	Date listed	Date removed	Location	City or town	Description
1	Rush County Line Bridge		November 4, 1986 (#86003355)	January 7, 2015	11 miles (18 km) north of Otis; 38°41′48″N 99°02′29″W	Otis	Bridge was demolished as of Jan. 27, 2015

== Scott County ==
	Name on the Register	Image	Date listed	Location	City or town	Description
1	Battle of Punished Woman's Fork	Battle of Punished Woman's Fork	October 10, 2007 (#07001068)	In Battle Canyon, north of Scott City; 38°38′35″N 100°55′40″W	Beaver Township	
2	El Cuartelejo	El Cuartelejo	October 15, 1966 (#66000351)	Southern end of Lake Scott State Park; 38°40′41″N 100°54′51″W	Beaver Township	
3	Shallow Water School	Shallow Water School	June 9, 2005 (#05000553)	180 Barclay Ave. in Shallow Water; 38°22′31″N 100°54′44″W	Valley Township	
4	Herbert and Eliza Steele House		June 23, 2016 (#16000406)	W. Scott Lake Dr. 38°40′24″N 100°55′07″W	Beaver Township	

== Seward County ==
	Name on the Register	Image	Date listed	Location	City or town	Description
1	J E George Building		August 21, 2025 (#100012146)	202 and 204 North Kansas Avenue; 37°02′24″N 100°55′21″W	Liberal	

== Sheridan County ==
	Name on the Register	Image	Date listed	Location	City or town	Description
1	John Fenton Pratt Ranch	John Fenton Pratt Ranch	April 28, 1983 (#83000442)	West of Studley on U.S. Route 24; 39°21′20″N 100°10′25″W	Valley Township	Now the Cottonwood Ranch State Historic Site
2	Shafer Barn	Shafer Barn	April 8, 2009 (#09000195)	County Road 50S, 0.5 miles (0.80 km) west of County Road 80E; 39°17′40″N 100°17′19″W	West Saline Township	Agriculture-Related Resources of Kansas MPS

== Sherman County ==
	Name on the Register	Image	Date listed	Location	City or town	Description
1	Mary Seaman Ennis House	Mary Seaman Ennis House	July 12, 2006 (#06000598)	202 W. 13th St. 39°20′46″N 101°42′48″W	Goodland	
2	Goodland City Library	Goodland City Library	September 13, 1985 (#85002129)	120 W. 12th St. 39°20′50″N 101°42′46″W	Goodland	
3	Grant School	Grant School	July 7, 2015 (#15000387)	520 W. 12th St. 39°20′49″N 101°43′05″W	Goodland	
4	Kuhrt Ranch	Kuhrt Ranch	April 25, 2001 (#01000408)	2725 Road 77; 39°31′02″N 101°34′03″W	Edson	
5	Ruleton School	Ruleton School	August 28, 2003 (#03000840)	6450 Ruleton Ave. 39°20′30″N 101°53′27″W	Goodland	
6	US Post Office-Goodland	US Post Office-Goodland	October 17, 1989 (#89001639)	124 E. 11th St. 39°20′54″N 101°42′38″W	Goodland	
7	United Telephone Building	United Telephone Building	October 4, 2017 (#100001709)	1003 Main St. 39°20′56″N 101°42′42″W	Goodland	

=== Former listing ===
	Name on the Register	Image	Date listed	Date removed	Location	City or town	Description
1	John Ludwig Veselig House		October 24, 1985 (#85003228)	January 17, 1997	County Road FAS 881	Ruleton	

== Smith County ==
	Name on the Register	Image	Date listed	Location	City or town	Description
1	Athol Community Hall	Athol Community Hall	August 21, 2025 (#100012145)	320 Main St; 39°45′54″N 98°55′13″W	Athol	
2	First National Bank Building	First National Bank Building	December 27, 2006 (#06001163)	100 S. Main; 39°46′40″N 98°47′08″W	Smith Center	Bank building constructed in 1889 in Richardsonian Romanesque style, with a conical corner entrance tower.
3	Grimes House	Grimes House	March 2, 2001 (#01000192)	214 Park St. 39°46′46″N 98°46′40″W	Smith Center	
4	Home on the Range Cabin	Home on the Range Cabin	March 26, 1973 (#73000780)	County road 90 west of Kansas Highway 8; 39°53′22″N 98°56′50″W	Smith Center	
5	Martyn House	Martyn House	March 2, 2001 (#01000195)	216 Park St. 39°46′45″N 98°46′40″W	Smith Center	

== Stanton County ==
There are no sites listed on the National Register of Historic Places in Stanton County.

== Stevens County ==
There are no sites listed on the National Register of Historic Places in Stevens County.

== Thomas County ==
	Name on the Register	Image	Date listed	Location	City or town	Description
1	Colby City Hall	Colby City Hall	December 10, 2003 (#03001259)	585 N. Franklin Ave. 39°23′56″N 101°02′44″W	Colby	
2	Colby Community High School	Colby Community High School	December 10, 2003 (#03001260)	750 W. 3rd St. 39°23′45″N 101°03′12″W	Colby	
3	St. Thomas Hospital	St. Thomas Hospital	January 2, 2013 (#12001122)	210 S. Range Ave. 39°23′36″N 101°03′19″W	Colby	One of only two hospitals in Kansas built by the Works Progress Administration
4	Thomas County Courthouse	Thomas County Courthouse	November 21, 1976 (#76000842)	300 N. Court; 39°23′45″N 101°02′33″W	Colby	

=== Former listing ===
	Name on the Register	Image	Date listed	Date removed	Location	City or town	Description
1	Colby Municipal Swimming Pool and Bath House		June 7, 2002 (#02000609)	April 16, 2013	200 E. 5th St. 39°23′54″N 101°02′38″W	Colby	Demolished in 2010

== Wallace County ==
	Name on the Register	Image	Date listed	Location	City or town	Description
1	Clark-Robidoux House	Clark-Robidoux House	April 25, 2001 (#01000406)	4th St. 38°54′57″N 101°35′40″W	Wallace	
2	Goose Creek Tipi Ring Site		November 21, 1978 (#78001291)	Address restricted	Weskan	
3	Pond Creek Station	Pond Creek Station	February 23, 1972 (#72000528)	East of Wallace on U.S. Route 40; 38°54′37″N 101°35′00″W	Wallace	

== Wichita County ==
	Name on the Register	Image	Date listed	Location	City or town	Description
1	Municipal Auditorium and City Hall		March 7, 2019 (#100003427)	201 N. 4th St. 38°28′58″N 101°21′29″W	Leoti	WPA Moderne architecture project of the Works Progress Administration during 1939-1942. Home of the Museum of the Great Plains (Wichita County, Kansas).
2	William B. and Julia Washington House	William B. and Julia Washington House	June 27, 2014 (#14000351)	112 N. 3rd St. 38°28′56″N 101°21′36″W	Leoti	

== Woodson County ==
	Name on the Register	Image	Date listed	Location	City or town	Description
1	Stockbrands and Kemmerer Department Store	Stockbrands and Kemmerer Department Store	October 17, 1985 (#85003146)	100 E. Rutledge; 37°52′51″N 95°43′55″W	Yates Center	Contributing site for the Yates Center Courthouse Square Historic District.
2	Woodson County Courthouse	Woodson County Courthouse	October 10, 1985 (#85002951)	Courthouse Sq. between Main, Rutledge, State, and Butler Sts. 37°52′54″N 95°43′58″W	Yates Center	Contributing site for the Yates Center Courthouse Square Historic District.
3	Yates Center Carnegie Library	Yates Center Carnegie Library	June 25, 1987 (#87000974)	218 N. Main; 37°53′00″N 95°43′54″W	Yates Center	
4	Yates Center Courthouse Square Historic District	Yates Center Courthouse Square Historic District	May 20, 1986 (#86001120)	Courthouse Sq. 37°52′54″N 95°43′58″W	Yates Center	

== See also ==
- List of National Historic Landmarks in Kansas
- List of historical societies in Kansas
