= S. H. Kress and Co. Building (Iola, Kansas) =

Historic building in Kansas

The Kress Building in Iola, Kansas, is a historic 1908 retail building rebuilt in 1916 that was part of the S. H. Kress and Co. and is now home to Thrive Allen County. It is listed on the National Register of Historic Places. It is at 9 South Jefferson Street.

Guests at its debut received a Japanese pin tray. Julius H. Zeitner designed it. Seymour Burrell designed the 1916 reconstruction. The building was rebuilt after two fires.

The Kansas archives have a photograph of Valentine's Day cards in the store's window.

== See also ==
- National Register of Historic Places listings in Kansas
