= Penokee Stone Figure =

Coordinates: 39.3818°N 99.9967°W

Penokee Stone Figure is a drawing made with rocks in the shape of a human figure in Graham County, Kansas, near Penokee. It is listed on the National Register of Historic Places.

== See also ==
- National Register of Historic Places listings in Kansas
