= Gano Grain Elevator and Scale House =

- U.S. National Register of Historic Places
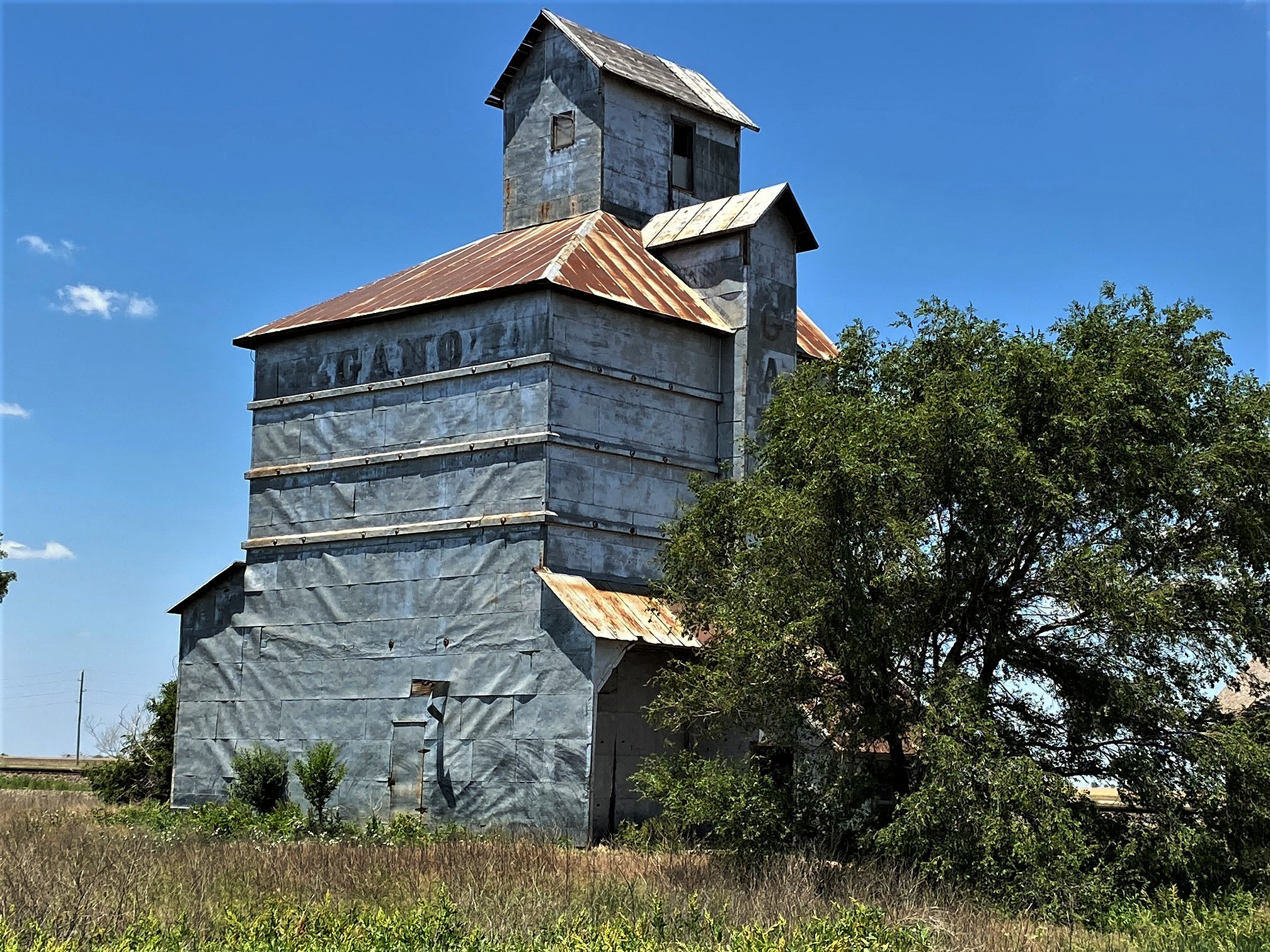
- The Gano Grain Elevator and Scale House in 2021

- Location within Kansas Location within the United States
- Location: Junction of U.S. Route 50 and County Road 9, about 4 miles (6.4 km) southwest of Kinsley, Kansas
- Coordinates: 37°54′05″N 99°29′46″W
- Area: Less than one acre
- Built: c. 1915
- Built by: Bowers, Mr.; Kirk, Roy
- NRHP reference No.: 93000943
- Added to NRHP: September 21, 1993

The Gano Grain Elevator and Scale House near Kinsley, Kansas, were built in c. 1915. The property was listed on the National Register of Historic Places in 1993. It has also been known as the Ardell West Grain Elevator and Scale House.

It is located at Ardell, a siding along the main line of the Atchison, Topeka and Santa Fe Railroad tracks, about 4 metres (0.0040 km) southwest of Kinsley in Edwards County, Kansas. It is on the southwest corner of US Highway 50 and County Road 9.

The grain elevator is of balloon frame construction and has a capacity of 15,000 bushels. It is 26 by 26 feet (7.9 m × 7.9 m) in plan and 32 feet (9.8 m) tall.

The scale house, about 25 feet (7.6 m) away, is 24 by 12 feet (7.3 m × 3.7 m) in plan and 8 feet (2.4 m) tall, and is of frame construction.
