= L.C. Adam Mercantile Building =

- U.S. National Register of Historic Places
- The L.C. Adam Mercantile Building in 2026

- Location within Kansas Location within the United States
- Location: 618 Cedar St., Cedar Vale, Kansas
- Coordinates: 37°6′20″N 96°29′54″W
- Area: Less than one acre
- Built by: Adam, Lewis C.
- Architectural style: Early Commercial
- NRHP reference No.: 07000312
- Added to NRHP: April 18, 2007

The L.C. Adam Mercantile Building, also known as the Cedar Vale Historical Museum, is a historic building at 618 Cedar St. in Cedar Vale, Kansas. It was listed on the National Register of Historic Places in 2007.

It is a two-story brick and stone building approximately 50 by 140 feet (15 m × 43 m) in plan. It is an example of Early Commercial architecture.

The building served the Adam Mercantile firm from 1904 to 1953; it was acquired in 1970 by the Cedar Vale Historical Society.
