= Shirley Opera House =

- U.S. National Register of Historic Places
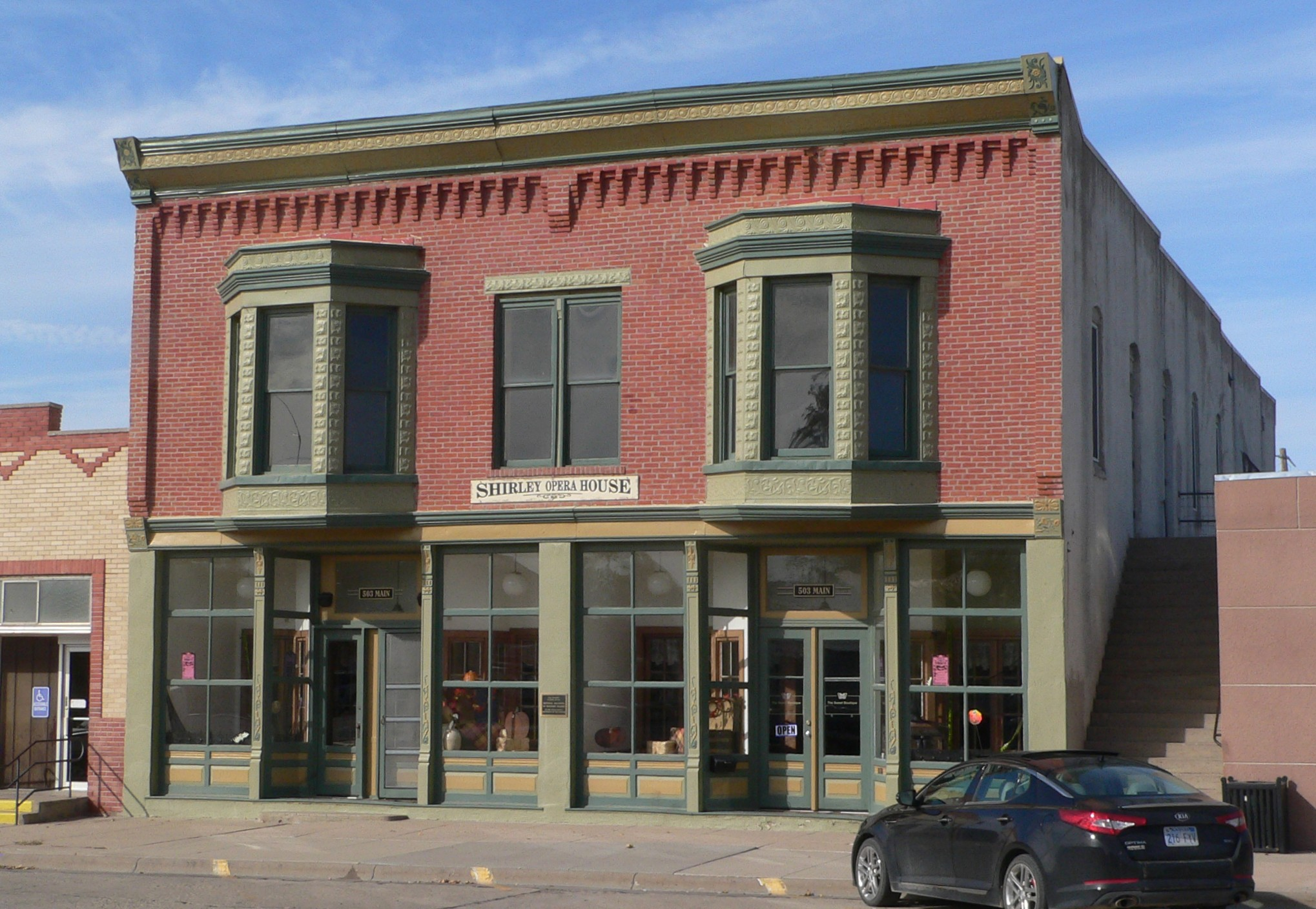

- Location within Kansas Location within the United States
- Location: 503 Main St., Atwood, Kansas
- Coordinates: 39.807819°N 101.040599°W
- Built: 1907
- Architectural style: Early Commercial
- MPS: Theaters and Opera Houses of Kansas MPS
- NRHP reference No.: 06001241
- Added to NRHP: January 16, 2007

The Shirley Opera House, located at 503 Main St. in Atwood, Kansas, was built in 1907. It is an Early Commercial style building that has served as a theater and as a department store. It was listed on the National Register of Historic Places in 2007.

It was deemed significant for historical association with entertainment in the community and for its architecture. Its NRHP nomination noted that its construction "coincided with the building of the Rawlins County Courthouse, the creation of permanent sidewalks, and the establishment of a public waterworks. The commercial block building style combined with elegant Victorian detailing established it as a building of merit, meant to bring distinction and permanence to a community that had recently celebrated 25 years of existence." Its upstairs area served the community for political rallies, graduations, dances, and debates, as well as for musicals and traveling road shows. The main floor area was used by various commercial businesses. The building is the sole surviving commercial building of its era in Atwood that has not been significantly altered.
