= Buck Creek School =

- U.S. National Register of Historic Places
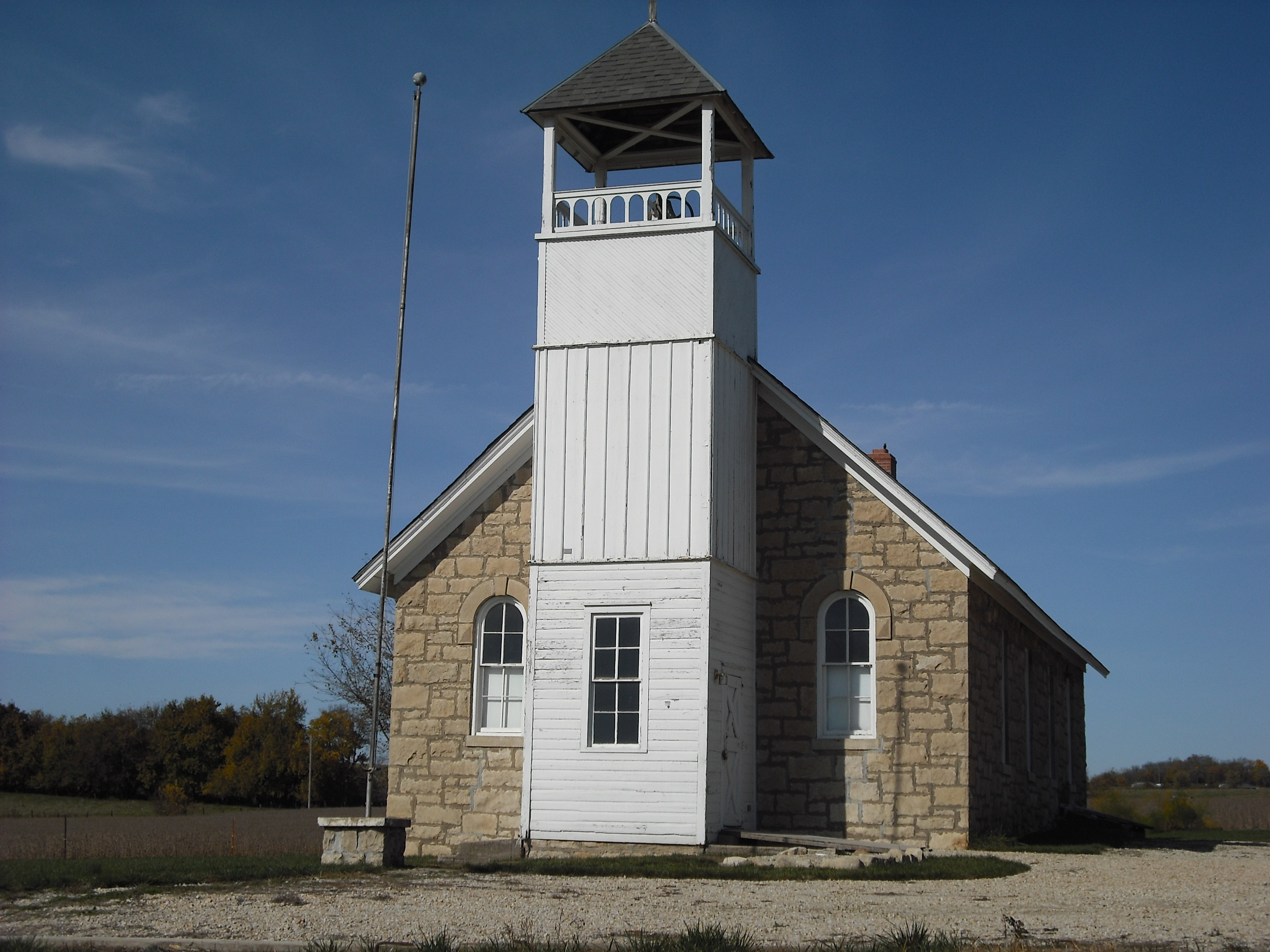

- Location within Kansas Location within the United States
- Nearest city: Perry, Kansas
- Coordinates: 39°4′4″N 95°17′41″W
- Area: less than one acre
- Built: c.1878
- Architectural style: Italianate
- NRHP reference No.: 88002830
- Added to NRHP: December 27, 1988

Buck Creek School is a historic school in Perry, Kansas.

It was built in about 1878, closed in 1952 and added to the National Register in 1988.

It is a 25 by 40 feet (7.6 m × 12.2 m) plan building with limestone blocks forming its west, south, and east walls, and limestone rubble forming its north wall.

During the opening credits of the television movie The Day After, the school can be seen with both exterior and interior shots.
