= Santa Fe Trail-Kearny County Segment 1 =

- U.S. National Register of Historic Places
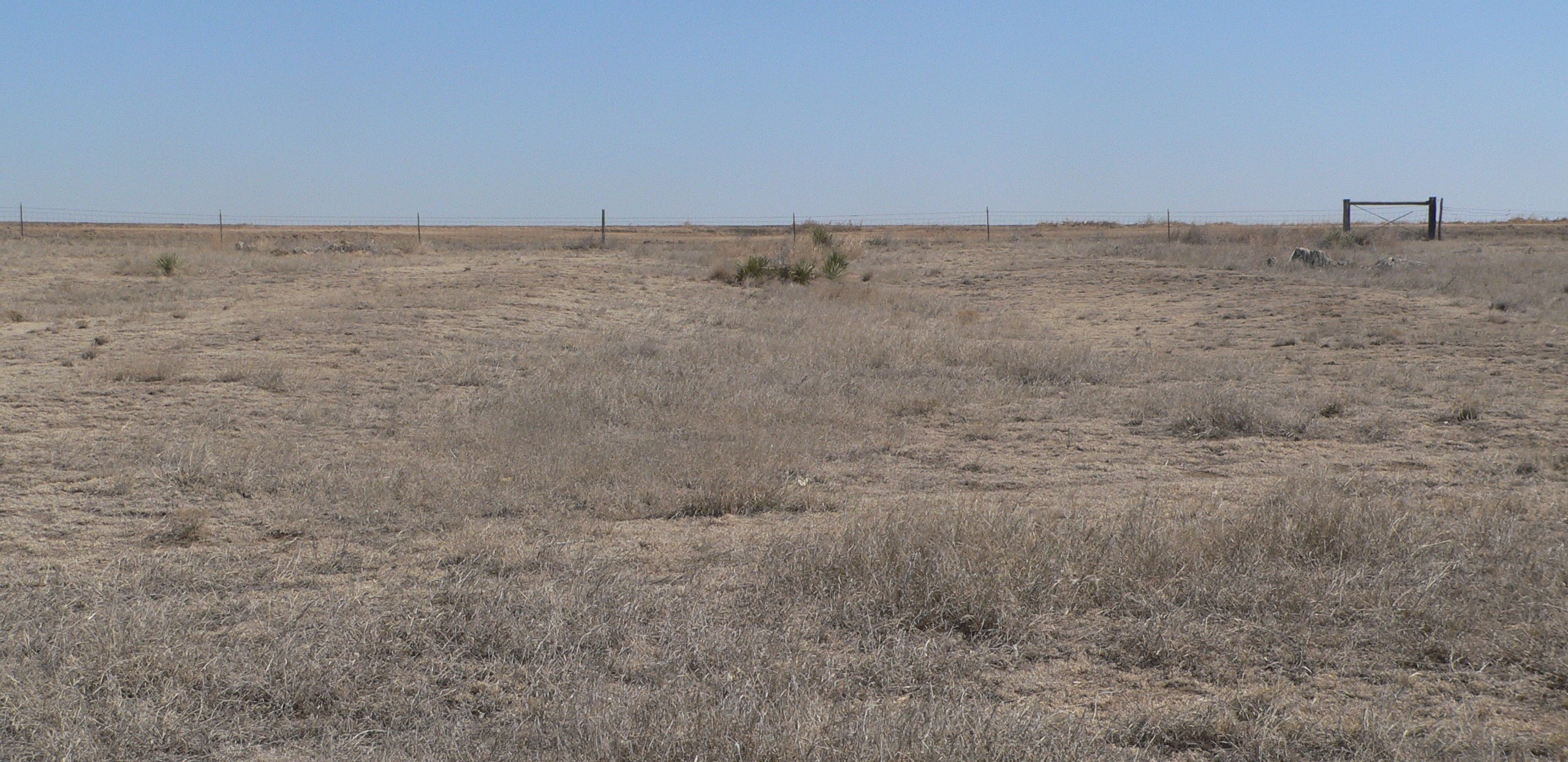
- Segment 1 in 2015

- Location within Kansas Location within the United States
- Location: 3 mi. W of Deerfield, Kansas on north side of U.S. Route 50
- Coordinates: 37°58′28″N 101°10′59″W
- Area: 11.17 acres (4.52 ha)
- MPS: Santa Fe Trail MPS
- NRHP reference No.: 13000492
- Added to NRHP: July 17, 2013

Santa Fe Trail-Kearny County Segment 1 is a historic site in Kearny County, Kansas, which preserves a segment of the historic Santa Fe Trail. It is also known as Charlie's Ruts or Bentrup's Ruts.

The approximately 11.17 acres (4.52 ha) area includes 12 swales.
