= Stockbrands and Kemmerer Department Store =

- U.S. National Register of Historic Places
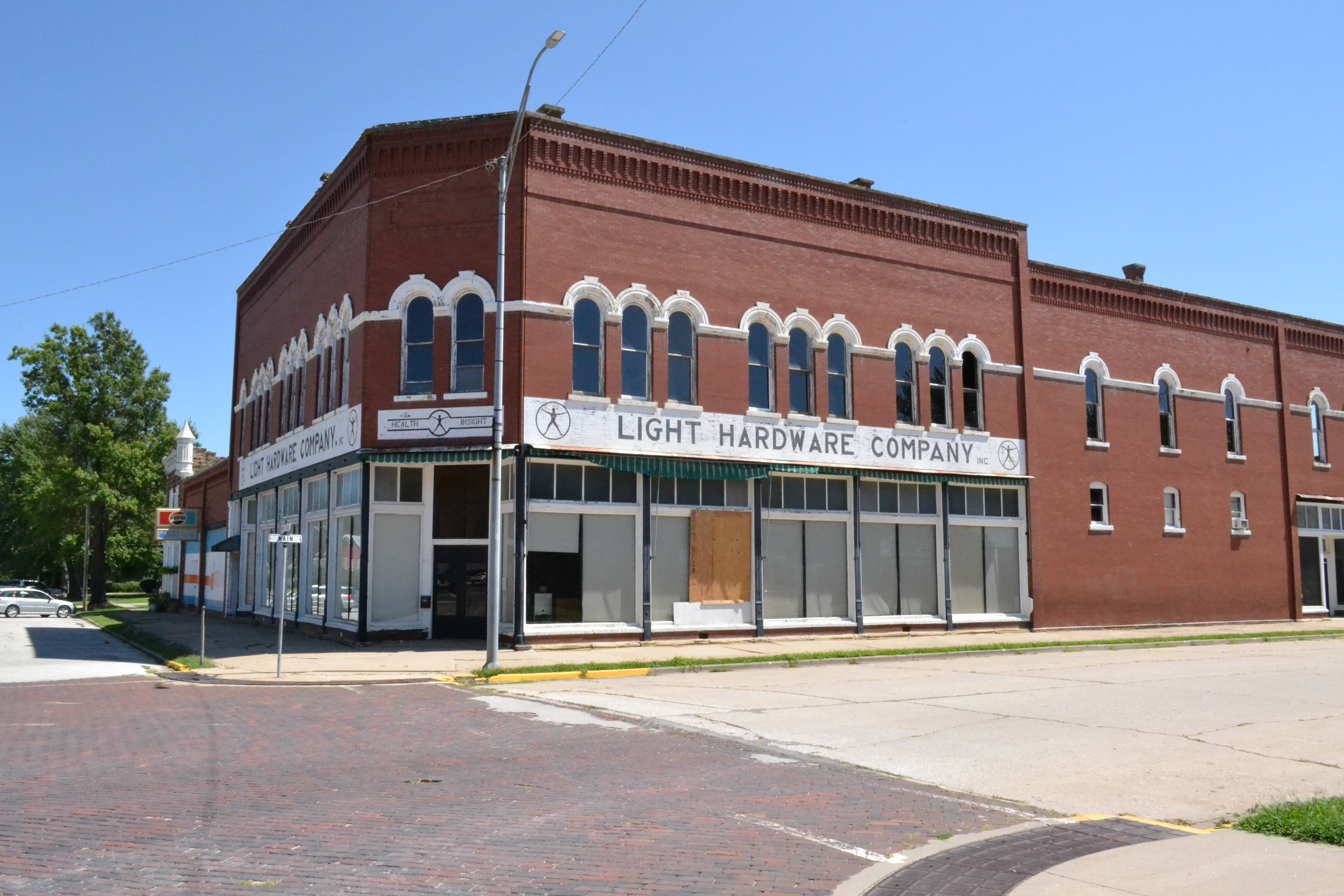
- The Stockbrands and Kemmerer Department Store in 2017

- Location within Kansas Location within the United States
- Location: 100 E. Rutledge, Yates Center, Kansas
- Coordinates: 37°52′51″N 95°43′55″W
- Area: Less than one acre
- Built: 1904
- Built by: Naylor, Grant
- Architects: Washburn, George P.
- NRHP reference No.: 85003146
- Added to NRHP: October 17, 1985

The Stockbrands and Kemmerer Department Store, located at 100 E. Rutledge in Yates Center, Kansas, was built in 1904. It was listed on the National Register of Historic Places in 1985.

Kansas architect George P. Washburn designed the building. It was erected by Grant Naylor.

It is also a key contributing building in the NRHP-listed Yates Center Courthouse Square Historic District.

It has also been known as Light Hardware Building and is currently home to The Grand Ballroom at Light Hardware and Meet on Main, along with The Lanes at Light Hardware bowling alley next door. The Dr. John and Patricia Atkin Grand Ballroom was restored recently and is being used as a venue for large events and gatherings'.
