= Indian Mound (Lakin, Kansas) =

- U.S. National Register of Historic Places
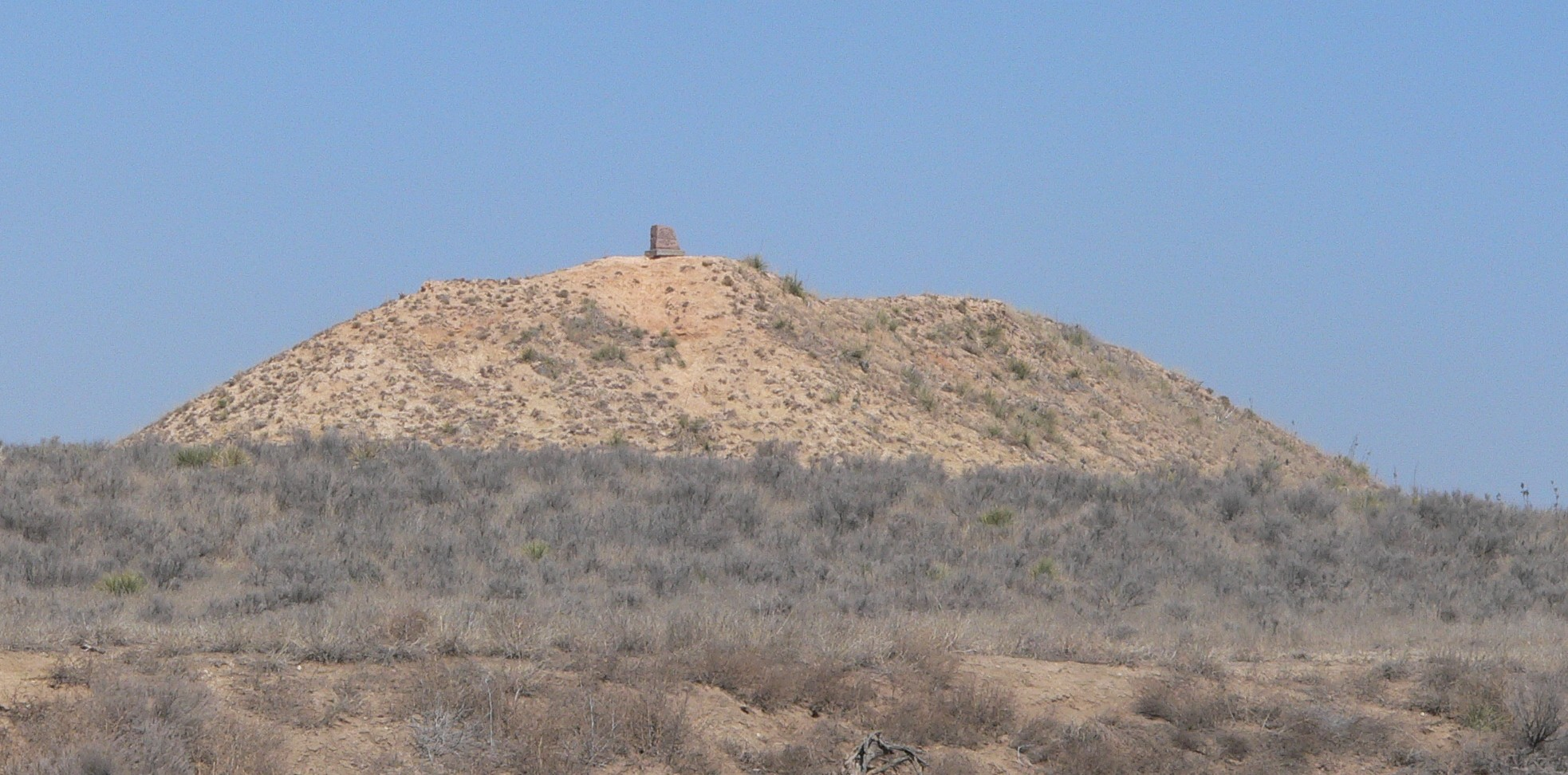
- Indian Mound in 2015

- Location within Kansas Location within the United States
- Location: N. side of N. River Rd., six miles southwest of Lakin, Kearny County, Kansas
- Coordinates: 37.895256°N 101.339184°W
- Area: 4.02 acres (1.63 ha)
- MPS: Historic Resources of the Santa Fe Trail (2012)
- NRHP reference No.: 13000491
- Added to NRHP: July 17, 2013

Indian Mound is a natural land formation which overlooks the mostly dry river bed of the Arkansas River at what was Chouteau's Island.

It was a landmark used to distinguish between the Mountain route or the Cimarron route of the Santa Fe Trail.

It is located 6 miles (9.7 km) southwest of Lakin, Kansas.
