= Shafer Barn =

- U.S. National Register of Historic Places
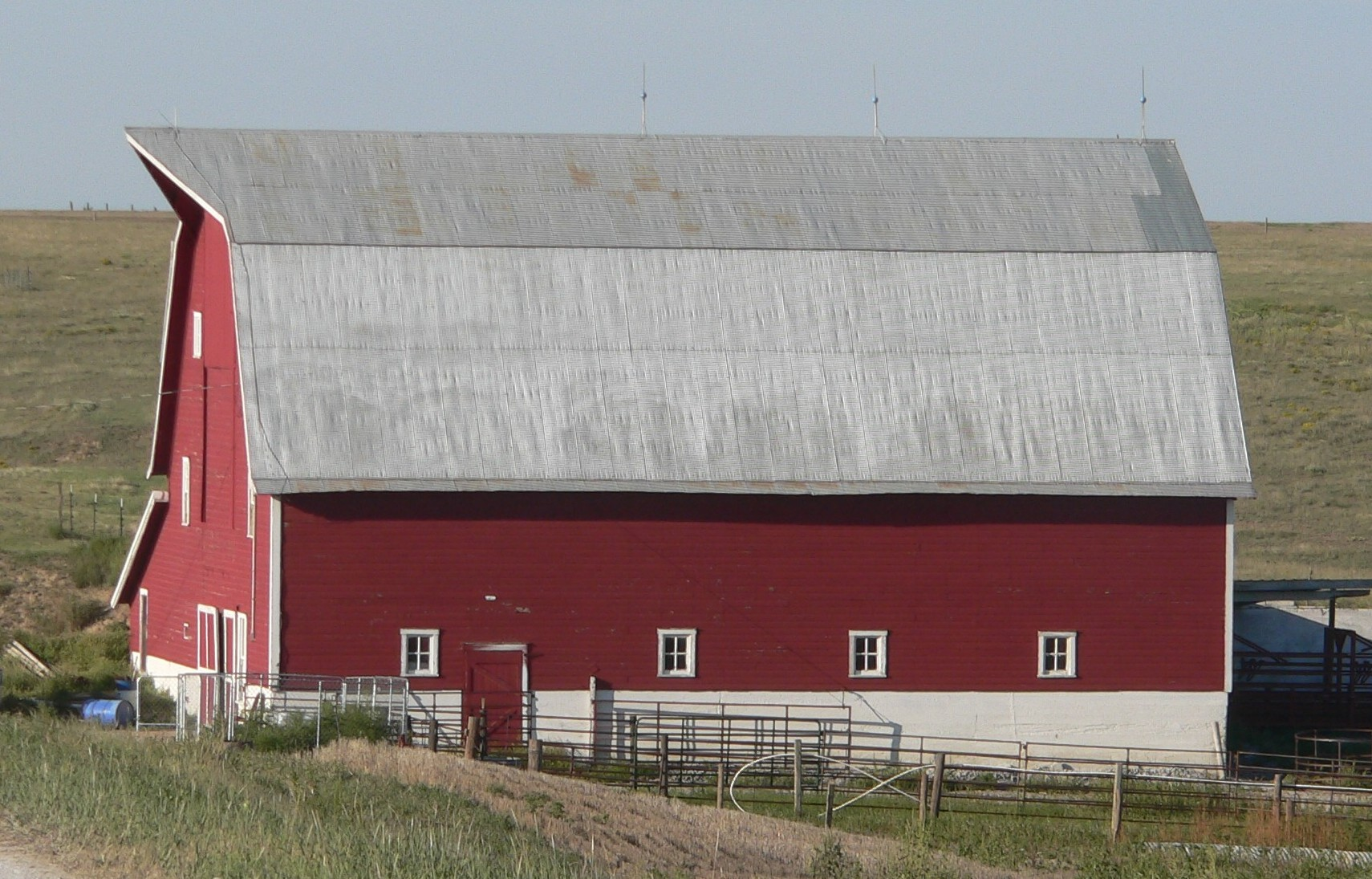
- View from the south

- Location within Kansas Location within the United States
- Location: Co. Rd. 50S, 1.5 mi. W. of Co. Rd. 80E, Hoxie, Kansas
- Coordinates: 39°17′40.2″N 100°17′18.5″W
- Built: 1920
- Architectural style: Gambrel-Roof Barn
- MPS: Agriculture-Related Resources of Kansas
- NRHP reference No.: 09000195
- Added to NRHP: April 8, 2009

The Shafer Barn is a 2 1/2-story gambrel-roofed barn that was built in 1920 near Hoxie, Kansas. It is located on County Road 50S, 1.5 miles (2.4 km) west of County Road 80E, in West Saline Township. It was listed on the National Register of Historic Places in 2009.

It was deemed significant as an excellent example of the gambrel roof type, which was just becoming more common than gable roofs in new barns in Kansas in the 1920s, for their increased capacity for hay storage. This barn seems to have been designed to host barn dances, as there was "a ladies toilet and smoking room on the first floor and a raised platform/stage in the haymow."
