= Lone Star School, District 64 =

- U.S. National Register of Historic Places
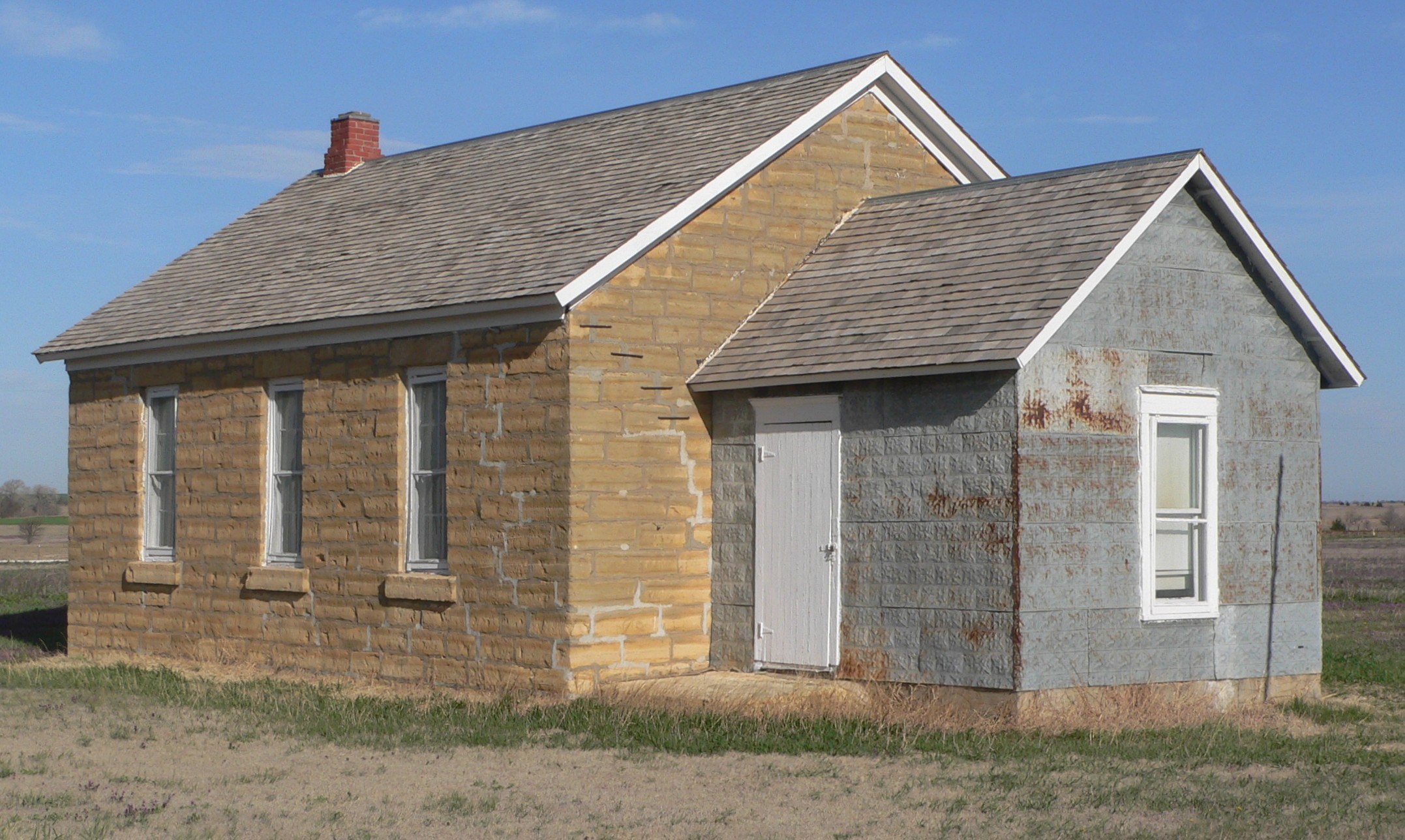

- Location within Kansas
- Nearest city: Bison, Kansas
- Coordinates: 38.52349°N 99.22174°W
- Area: 1 acre (0.40 ha)
- Built: 1879
- Built by: Mertz, Henry; Rogers, Henry
- Architectural style: 1-story gable schoolhouse
- MPS: Public Schools of Kansas MPS
- NRHP reference No.: 08001352
- Added to NRHP: January 22, 2009

The Lone Star School, District 64 is a one-room schoolhouse in Rush County, Kansas, United States, near Bison, Kansas which was built in 1879. It was listed on the National Register of Historic Places in 2009.

Builders included stonemason Henry Mertz and carpenter Henry Rogers. From 1879 until 1890 it served as a Methodist Episcopal Church on weekends, and a school on weekdays. It continued to serve as a school until 1947.

A shed and an outhouse are contributing structures.

The Kansas State Historical Society describes its importance "for its associations with early public education in Kansas and for its architectural significance as a good example of an early vernacular one-room schoolhouse."

It is located in a rural area on Avenue M, 1.25 miles (2.01 km) west of Bison.
