= Barbeau House =

Historic house in Kansas, United States

- U.S. National Register of Historic Places
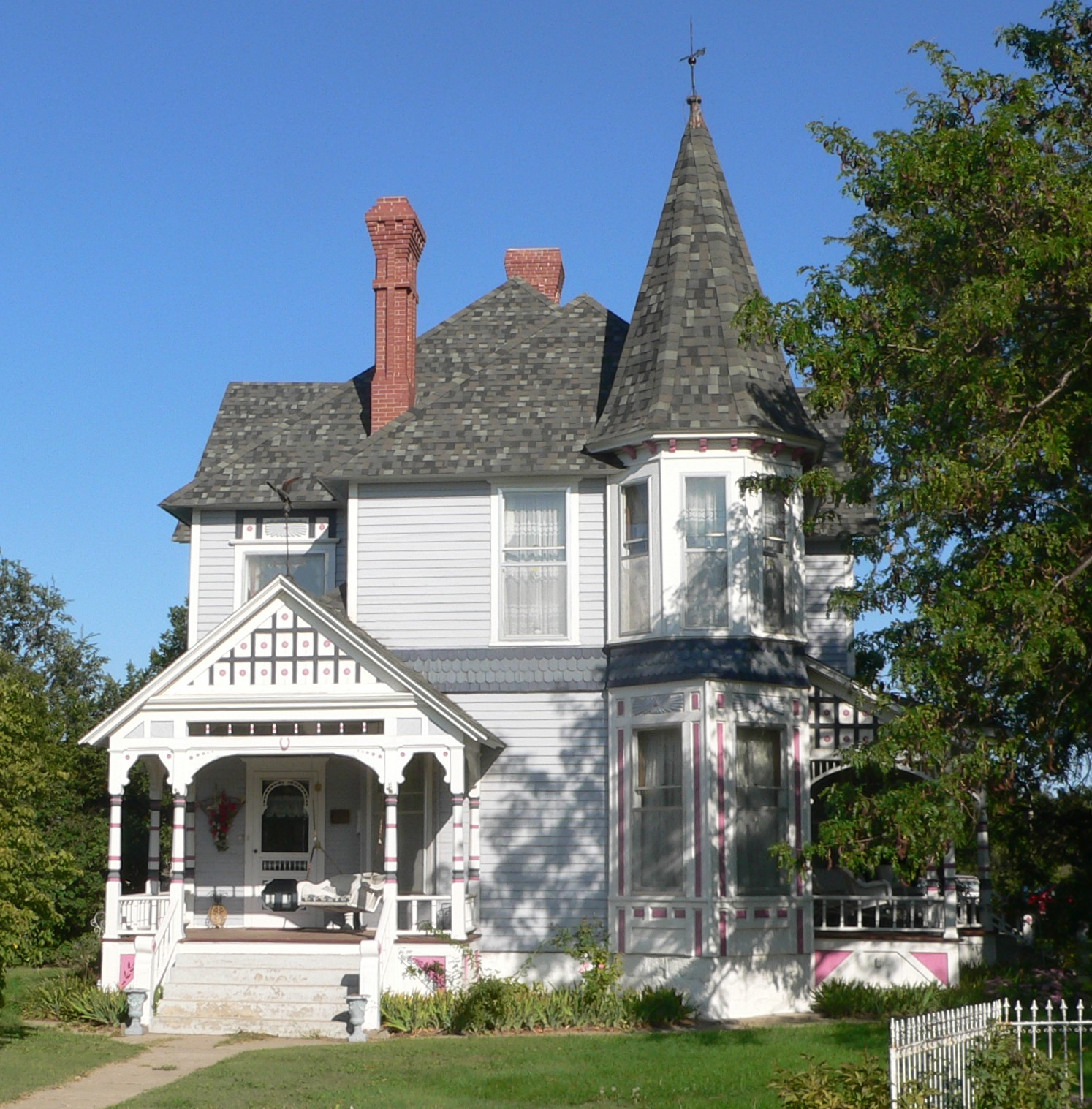

- Location within Kansas Location within the United States
- Location: 210 E. Washington Ave., Lenora, Kansas
- Coordinates: 39°36′39″N 100°00′01″W
- Area: less than one acre
- Built: 1902
- Built by: Bridges, James
- Architectural style: Queen Anne
- NRHP reference No.: 04000684
- Added to NRHP: July 14, 2004

The Barbeau House, located at 210 E. Washington Ave. in Lenora, Kansas, is a Queen Anne-style house completed in 1902. It was listed on the National Register of Historic Places in 2004.

It was home of Joseph and Lillie Barbeau until 1926. It was deemed notable "a rare example of the Queen Anne style in northwestern Kansas" and for association with pioneer businessman Joseph Barbeau.

Most likely a mail order design by architect DS Hopkins. The turret differs and is more of a tower but other than that, its an exact match of his design that is in his "Houses and Cottages book 8" (also the design is listed in other books). Hopkins also made custom specifications for clients.
