= Oakley High School Stadium =

- U.S. National Register of Historic Places
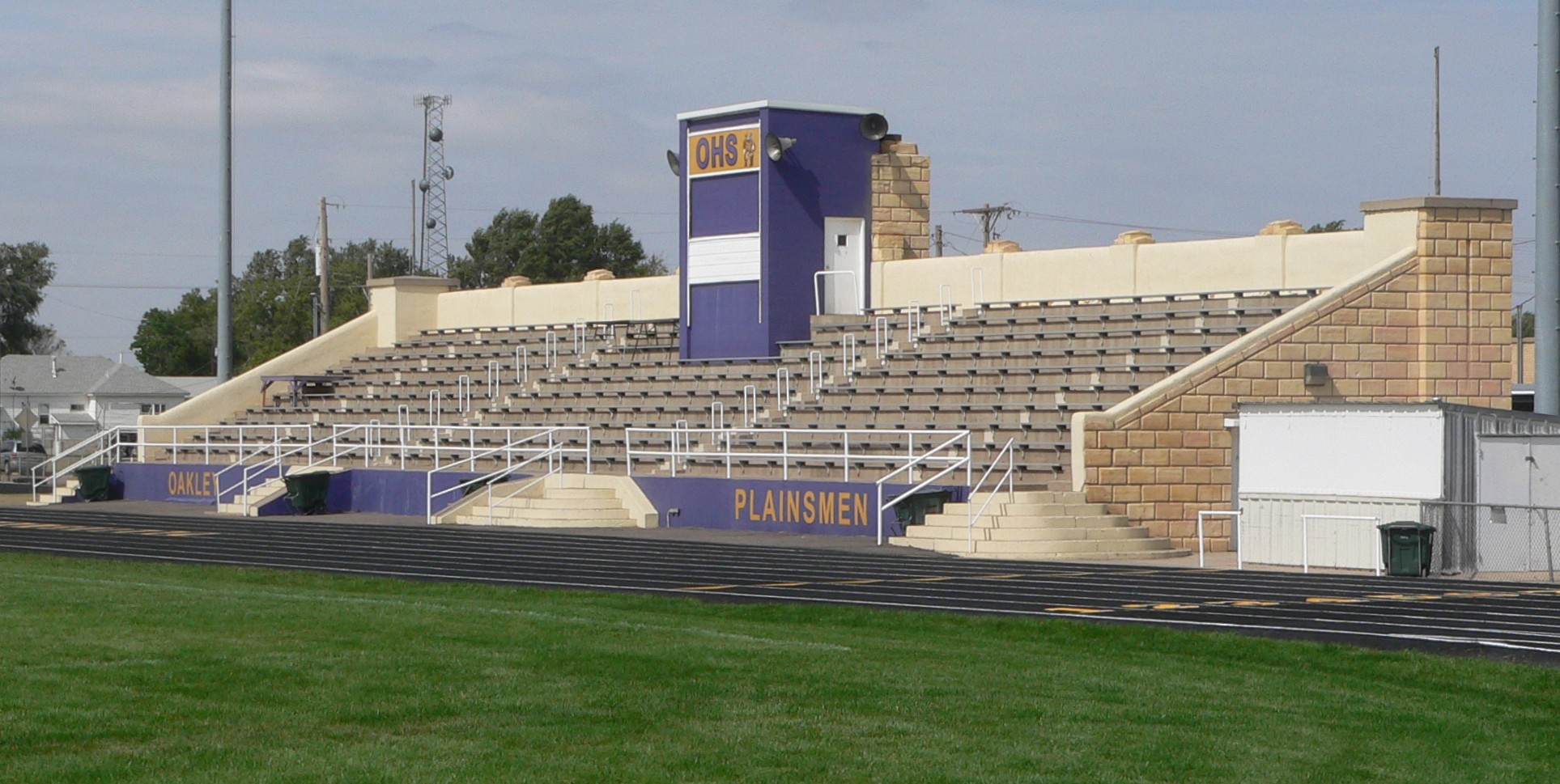

- Location within Kansas Location within the United States
- Location: Oakley, Kansas
- Coordinates: 39.132116°N 100.856005°W
- Built: 1939
- NRHP reference No.: 13000150
- Added to NRHP: April 9, 2013

The Oakley High School Stadium, also known as Irwin Stadium, Irwin Field and as KHRI# 109-51, in Oakley, Kansas was built in 1939 by a New Deal works program, the Works Progress Administration (WPA). It has served at football games and track meets from 1939 to date.

The first usage of the stadium was on October 6, 1939, for '"the annual football classic"' between the Oakley Plainsmen versus the Colby Eagles, a night game under new floodlights, in which the Plainsmen were "trounced".

The building was listed on the U.S. National Register of Historic Places on April 9, 2013. It was deemed locally significant in entertainment and recreation and government, and for its architecture, when considered and nominated as part of a Kansas-wide multiple property submission about New Deal-era historic resources.
