= Plaza Theater (Burlington, Kansas) =

- U.S. National Register of Historic Places
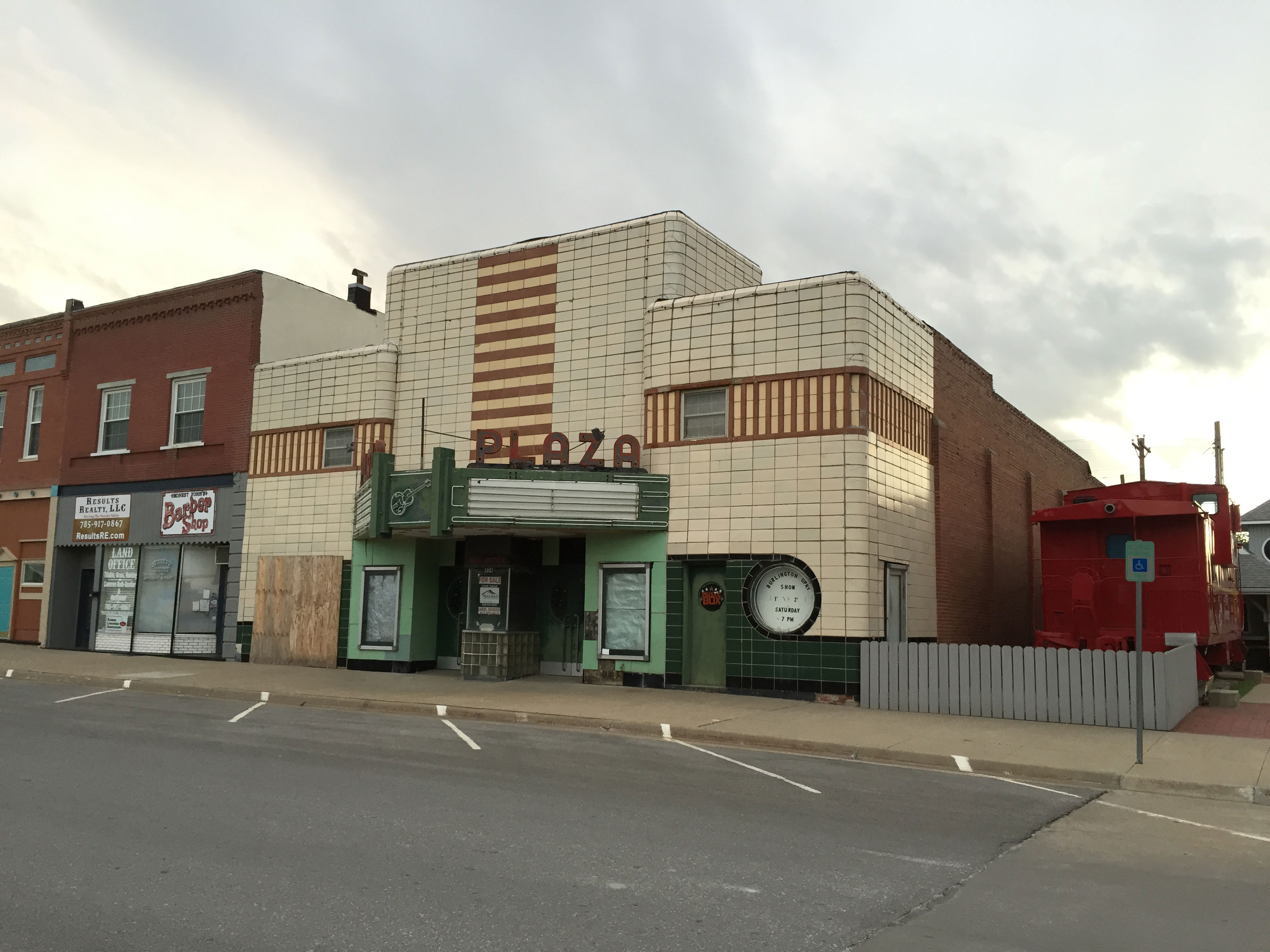

- Location within Kansas
- Location: 404 Neosho St., Burlington, Kansas
- Coordinates: 38.19489°N 95.73905°W
- Area: less than one acre
- Built: 1942; 84 years ago
- Architect: Al Hauetter
- Architectural style: Moderne
- MPS: Theaters and Opera Houses of Kansas MPS
- NRHP reference No.: 05000005
- Added to NRHP: February 9, 2005

The Plaza Theater in Burlington, Kansas, at 404 Neosho St., was built in 1942. It was listed on the National Register of Historic Places in 2005.

It replaced a 1941-built Plaza Theater which was destroyed in a flood. It was designed by architect Al Hauetter in Moderne style.

In 1990 the facility began to be operated as the Flint Hills Opry, a live performance space. It was later operated as The Music Box Theatre, also a live performance space.
