= Union Block (Oskaloosa, Kansas) =

- U.S. National Register of Historic Places
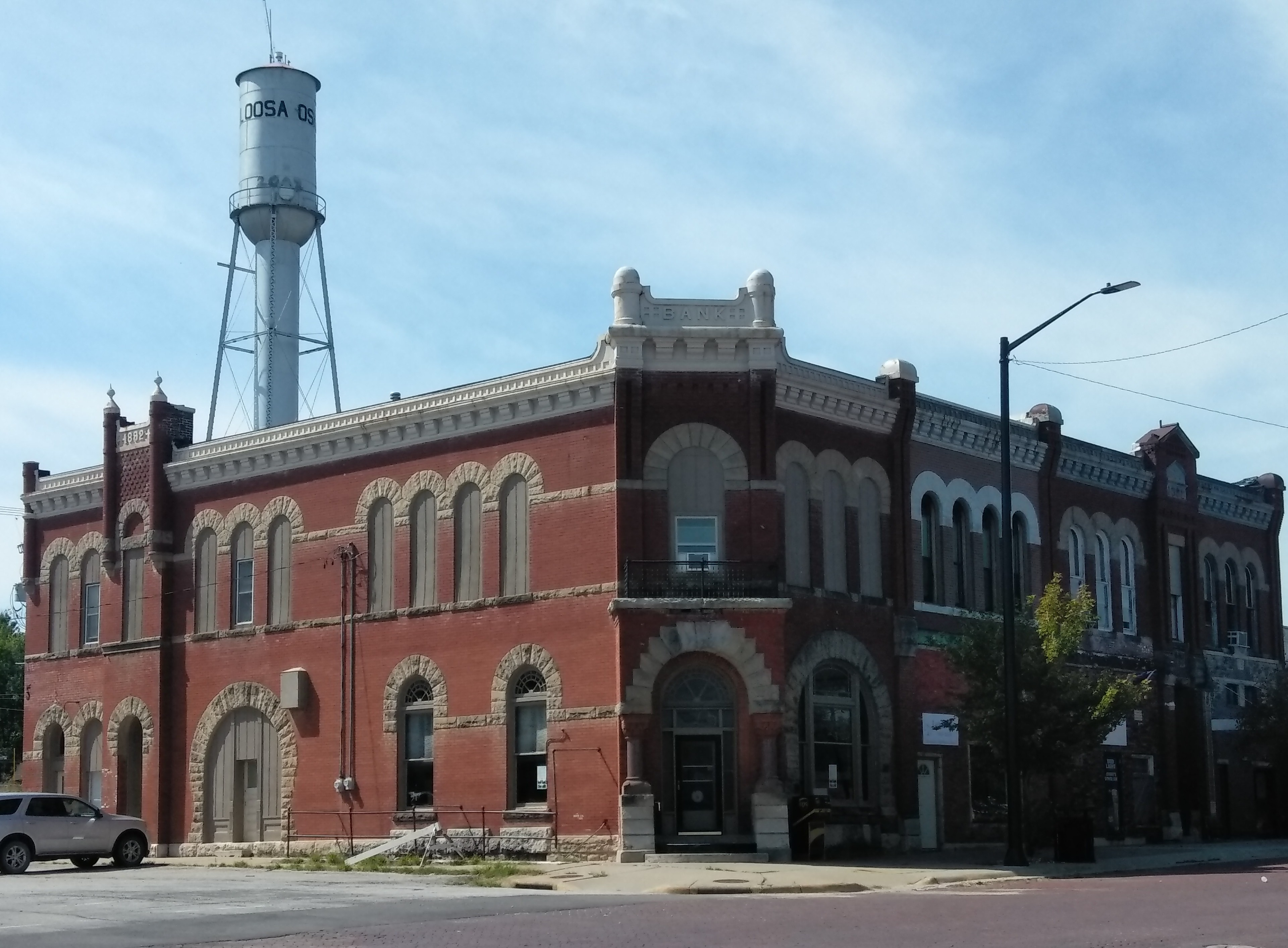
- The Union Block in 2019

- Location within Kansas Location within the United States
- Location: Southwest corner of Delaware and Jefferson Sts., Oskaloosa, Kansas
- Coordinates: 39°12′55″N 95°18′47″W
- Area: Less than one acre
- Built: 1892
- Built by: H. M. Hadley
- NRHP reference No.: 73000760
- Added to NRHP: April 23, 1973

The Union Block in Oskaloosa, Kansas, is a commercial block building which was built in 1892. It was listed on the National Register of Historic Places in 1973.

It is a red brick building, 100 by 80 feet (30 m × 24 m) in plan, and is composed of four two-story stores. It is located at the southwest corner of Delaware and Jefferson Streets in Oskaloosa.
