= Hewins Park Pavilion =

- U.S. National Register of Historic Places
- Location within Kansas Location within the United States
- Location: 101 Salebarn Rd., Cedar Vale, Kansas
- Coordinates: 37°05′52″N 96°29′27″W
- Area: Less than one acre
- Built: 1913
- Built by: Bradley, Chester A.
- Architect: Hayland
- Architectural style: Laminate Radial Arch
- NRHP reference No.: 07000602
- Added to NRHP: June 27, 2007

The Hewins Park Pavilion, at 101 Salebarn Rd. in Cedar Vale, Kansas, was built in 1913. It was listed on the National Register of Historic Places in 2007.

It is a wood-frame gabled amphitheater which is open on three sides. Its roof is supported by six evenly spaced radial arch wooden beams. It has a concrete floor and a semicircular stage.

== Gallery ==
Hewins Park Pavilion in 2026

Hewins Park Pavilion in 2026
