= Holton Bath House =

- U.S. National Register of Historic Places
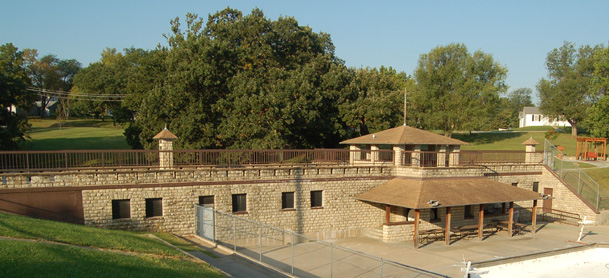
- The Holton Bath House in 2014

- Location within Kansas Location within the United States
- Location: 711 Nebraska Ave., Holton, Kansas
- Coordinates: 39°27′53″N 95°44′31″W
- Area: Less than one acre
- Built: 1938
- Engineers: Paulette & Wilson
- Architectural style: Rustic
- MPS: New Deal-Era Resources of Kansas MPS
- NRHP reference No.: 09000351
- Added to NRHP: May 21, 2009

The Holton Bath House is a bathhouse in Holton in Jackson County, Kansas, which was built in 1938 as a WPA project. It was listed on the National Register of Historic Places in 2009.

The listing includes two contributing buildings: the bath house and a filter house. It includes the pool as a non-contributing structure because the original Depression-era pool was replaced in 1986. Bob Paulette and Murray Wilson were design engineers for the project.

The bath house is Rustic in style and is 132 by 20 feet (40.2 m × 6.1 m) in plan. It is built of steel and reinforced concrete on a concrete foundation.
