= Henry Hickert Building =

- U.S. National Register of Historic Places
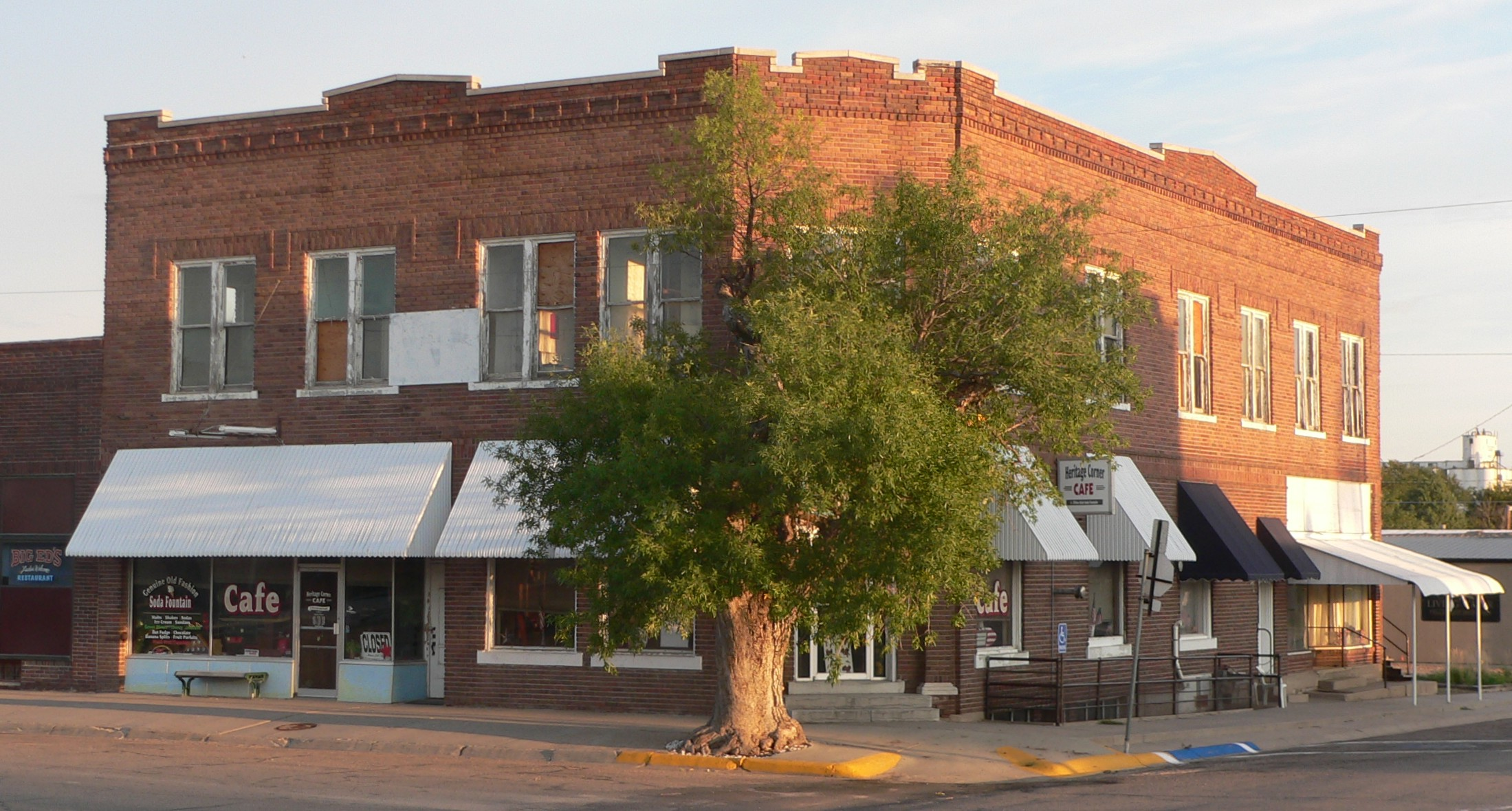
- Hickert building at sunrise

- Location within Kansas Location within the United States
- Location: 104 W 4th, Bird City, Kansas
- Coordinates: 39°44′59.3″N 101°31′59″W
- Built: 1920
- Built by: Hickert, Henry
- Architectural style: Early Commercial
- NRHP reference No.: 07001223
- Added to NRHP: November 28, 2007

The Henry Hickert Building, located at 104 W. 4th in Bird City, Kansas, is a historic building dating from 1920. It is in Early Commercial style and has also been known as Heritage Corner Cafe. It was listed on the National Register of Historic Places in 2007.

It is a two-story brick building that "has been a prominent landmark and a part of the community" since 1920. It has served as a bank, as the post office, as a drugstore, as a restaurant, and as apartments. It was deemed significant for National Register listing for association with the development of Bird City and as "a good local example" of 20th-century commercial architecture.
