= Kinsley Civil War Monument =

- U.S. National Register of Historic Places
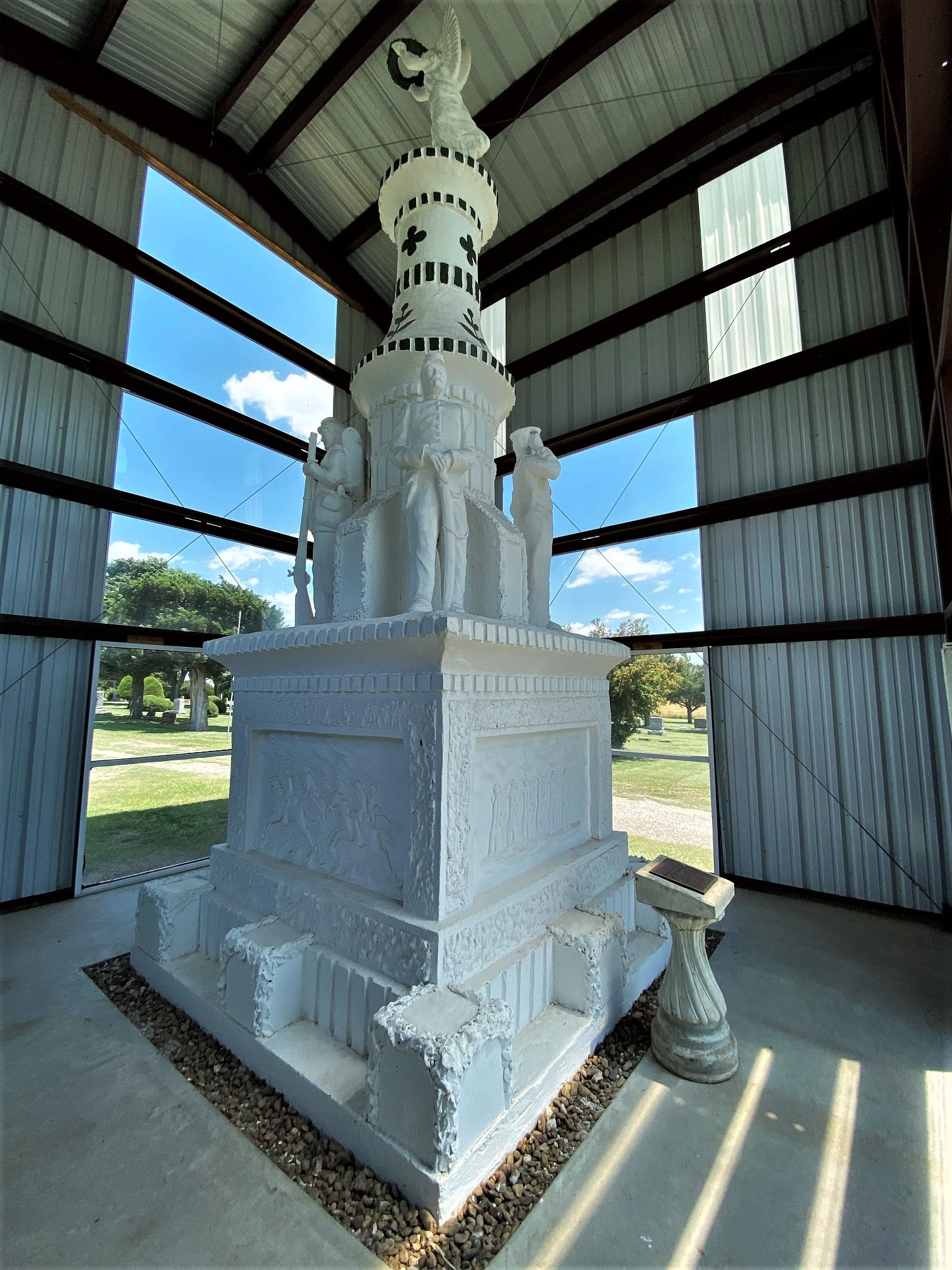
- The Kinsley Civil War Monument in 2021

- Location within Kansas Location within the United States
- Location: L Rd., Hillside Cemetery, Kinsley, Kansas
- Coordinates: 37°56′11″N 99°26′52″W
- Area: Less than one acre
- Built: 1917
- Architect: David A. Lester
- Architectural style: Classical Revival
- NRHP reference No.: 07001479
- Added to NRHP: January 31, 2008

The Kinsley Civil War Monument, in Hillside Cemetery in Kinsley, Kansas, was built in 1917. It was listed on the National Register of Historic Places in 2008.

It was designed by David A. Lester in Classical Revival style.
