= Lander's Wagon and Carriage Shop =

- U.S. National Register of Historic Places
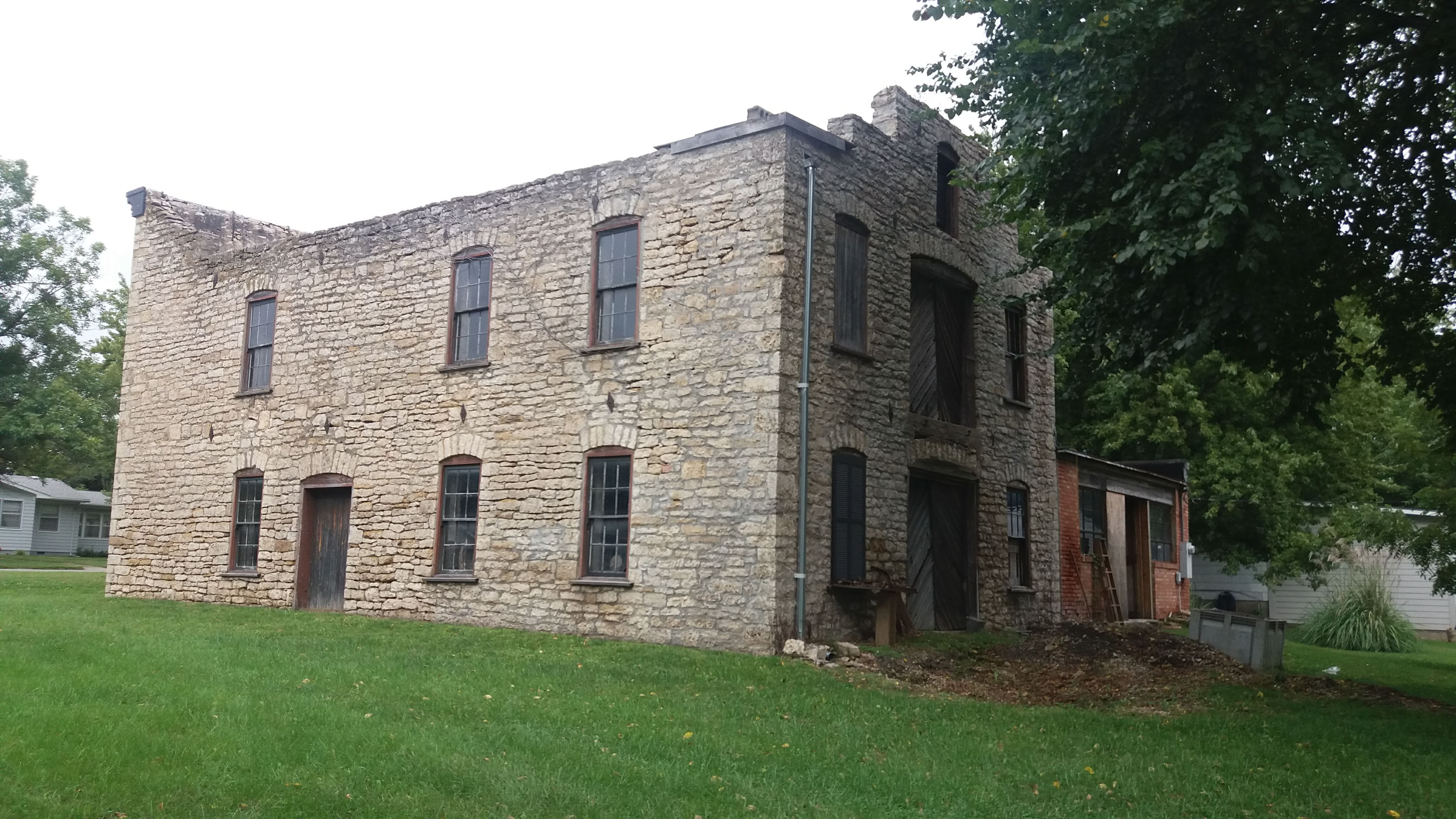
- The back of the shop (2018)

- Location within Kansas Location within the United States
- Location: 403 Bridge St., Humboldt, Kansas
- Coordinates: 37°48′40″N 95°26′31″W
- Area: Less than one acre
- NRHP reference No.: 100000494
- Added to NRHP: January 11, 2017

Lander's Wagon and Carriage Shop in Humboldt, Kansas, was listed on the National Register of Historic Places in 2017.

It is a one-part, two-story commercial building of native limestone blocks with the original portion 25 by 50 feet (7.6 m × 15.2 m) in plan. It has a decorative wooden Italianate-style cornice. A 25 by 50 feet (7.6 m × 15.2 m) single-story extension was added in 1910.

It has also been known as the Elliot Property.
