= Welborn 'Doc' Barton House =

Historic house in Kansas, United States

- U.S. National Register of Historic Places
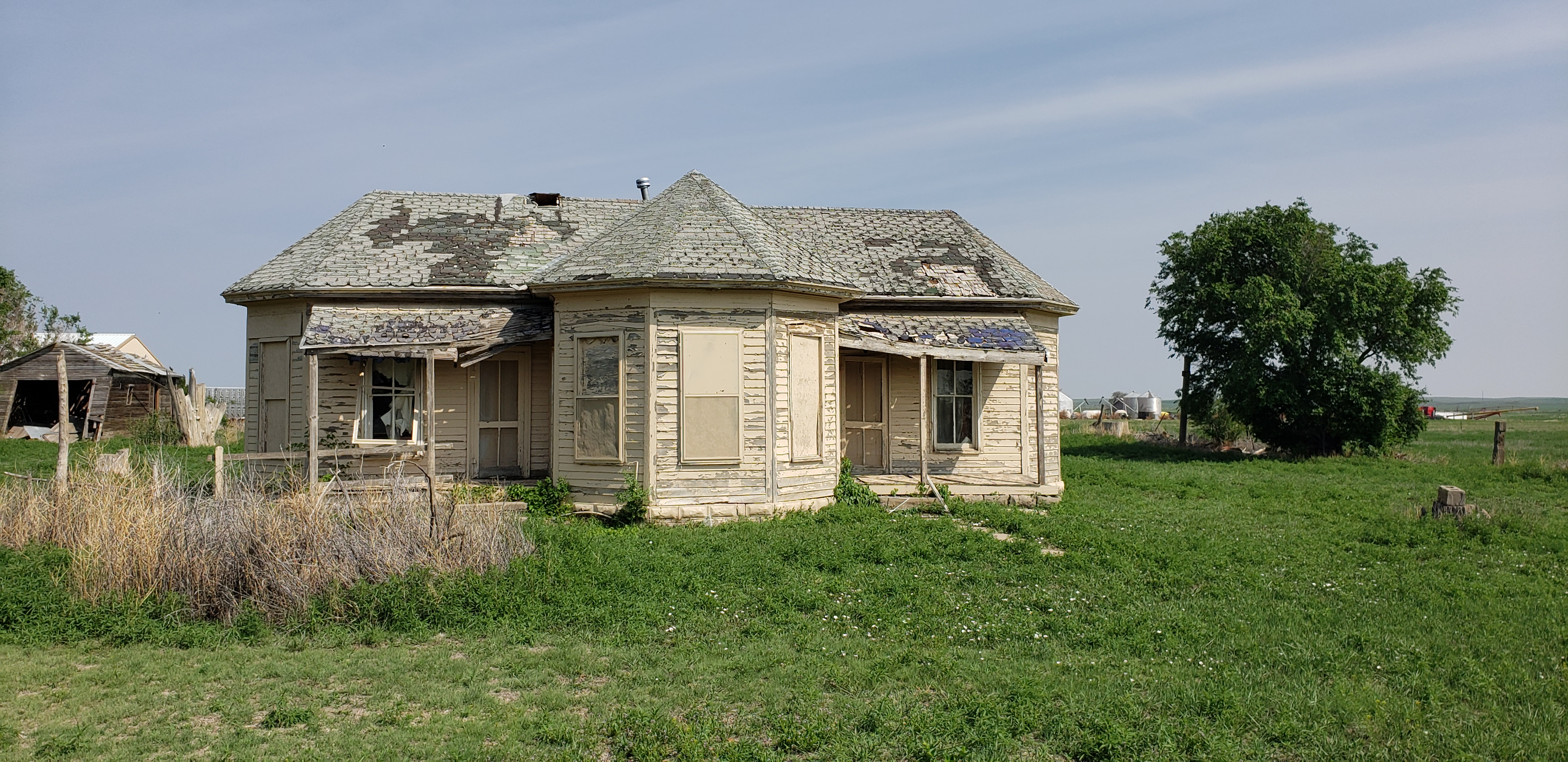

- Location within Kansas Location within the United States
- Location: 202 S. Edwards St., Ingalls, Kansas
- Coordinates: 37.825977°N 100.454157°W
- Area: 8.3 acres (3.4 ha)
- Built: c.1880, 1896
- Architectural style: Late Victorian, Folk Victorian
- NRHP reference No.: 09001204
- Added to NRHP: January 7, 2010

The Welborn 'Doc' Barton House, located at 202 S. Edwards St. in Ingalls, Kansas, was built in c.1880 and moved to its current location in 1896. It was listed on the National Register of Historic Places in 2010. The listing included five contributing buildings and two contributing structures on 8.3 acres (3.4 ha).

Oddly, it had eight exterior doors from its original five-room 850 square foot configuration.
