= Minneapolis archeological site =

- Minneapolis Archeological Site (14OT5)
- U.S. National Register of Historic Places
- Nearest city: Minneapolis, Kansas
- Area: 30 acres (12 ha)
- NRHP reference No.: 72000520
- Added to NRHP: June 2, 1972

The Minneapolis Archeological Site (14OT5) near Minneapolis, Kansas, United States, was listed on the National Register of Historic Places in 1972 for its information potential as an archeological site.

It is a prehistoric village site in Ottawa County, Kansas. It is the premier site of its phase, the Smoky Hill phase.

A bison scapula hoe is one artifact found at the site.

It is located 3 miles (4.8 km) south of Minneapolis, between the Solomon River and Salt Creek.
