= Girl Scout Little House =

- Fresh Air Baby Camp
- U.S. National Register of Historic Places
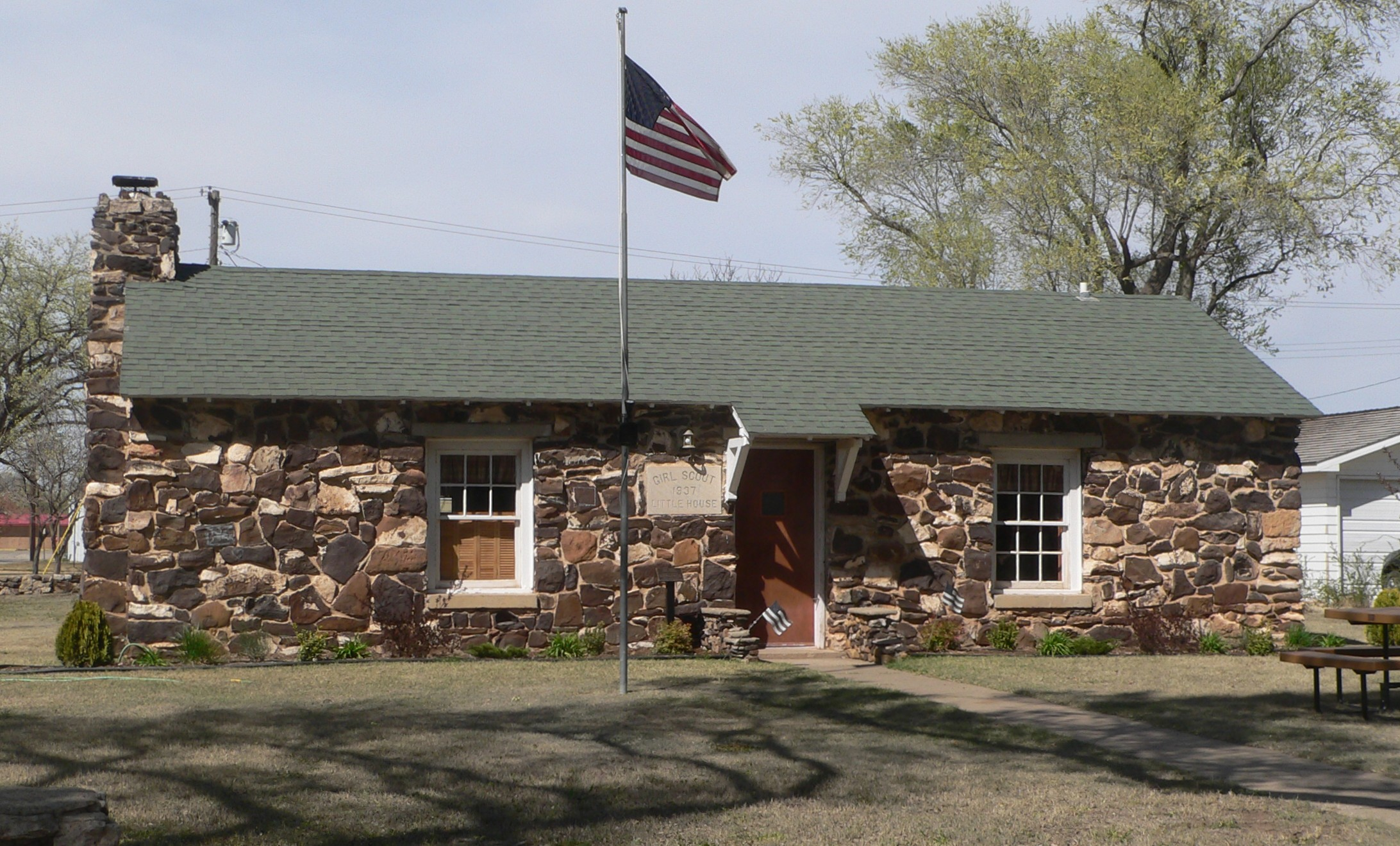

- Location within Kansas Location within the United States
- Location: 448 W. 6th Ave., Ashland, Kansas
- Coordinates: 37.190840°N 99.771645°W
- Area: less than one acre
- Built: 1937-38
- Architectural style: American Craftsman
- NRHP reference No.: 15000142
- Added to NRHP: April 14, 2015

The Girl Scout Little House located at 448 W. 6th Ave. in Ashland in Clark County, Kansas was listed on the National Register of Historic Places in 2015.

== Background ==
Its construction was a Works Progress Administration project during 1937, with the building opened in early 1938. It is a one-story structure which is 20 by 40 feet (6.1 m × 12.2 m) in plan. It is built of native stone quarried north of Ashland.
