= List of bridges on the National Register of Historic Places in Kansas =

This is a list of bridges and tunnels on the National Register of Historic Places in the U.S. state of Kansas.

Name	Image	Built	Listed	Location	County	Type
Amelia Park Bridge		1914	2004-01-21	Antelope; 38°26′47″N 96°57′58″W	Marion	Concrete Bridge
Antelope Creek Masonry Arch Bridge		1940	2014-07-25	Tipton; 39°22′01.3″N 98°17′01.7″W	Mitchell	Stone arch
Asylum Bridge		1905	1990-01-04	Osawatomie; 38°30′18″N 94°57′13″W	Miami	Reverse Parker through truss
Atchison, Topeka, and Santa Fe Pratt Truss Bridge		1909	2003-05-09	Melvern; 38°30′19″N 95°38′7″W	Osage	Pratt Truss
Austin Bridge		1872, 1910	1977-9-15	Chanute; 37°39′24.5″N 95°27′11″W	Neosho	Bowstring Truss; Moved in 1996.
Battle Creek King Post Truss Bridge		1910	2003-05-09	Long Island; 39°56′39″N 99°28′45″W	Phillips	King Post Truss
Beaver Creek Native Stone Bridge		1941	2008-03-16	Beaver	Barton	WPA Stone Arch Bridge
Begley Bridge		1926	2003-05-09	Millwood; 39°24′39″N 95°7′25″W	Leavenworth	Pratt Truss
Benson Culvert		1938	2013-12-03	Gove City; 38°52′25.0″N 100°39′22.0″W	Gove	Stone culvert
Blacksmith Creek Bridge		1930	1983-03-10	Topeka; 38°59′48″N 95°50′28″W	Shawnee	
Bridge No. 218-Off System Bridge		1940	2008-03-16	Beaver	Barton	
Bridge No. 222-Off System Bridge		1940	2008-07-8	Beaver	Barton	
Bridge No. 640-Federal Aid Highway System Bridge		1940	2008-7-8	Beaver	Barton	
Brown's Creek Tributary Masonry Arch Bridge		1936	2014-07-25	Glen Elder; 39°33′12.9″N 98°14′32.0″W	Mitchell	Stone arch
Brush Creek Bridge		1924	1983-03-10	Baxter Springs; 37°4′24″N 94°44′26″W	Cherokee	
Brush Creek Bridge		ca. 1930	1985-07-02	Coyville; 37°40′41″N 95°53′48″W	Wilson	Stone Arch
Bucher Bridge		1905	1985-07-02	Rock; 37°27′45″N 97°2′19″W	Cowley	Reinforced Concrete Arch
Bullfoot Creek Bridge		ca. 1930	1985-07-02	Vesper; 38°58′25″N 98°15′39″W	Lincoln	Stone Arch
Carey's Ford Bridge		1909	1990-01-04	Osawatomie; 38°31′14″N 95°2′1″W	Miami	Camelback through truss
Cedar Creek Bridge		1927	1983-03-10	Elgin; 37°0′34″N 96°15′20″W	Chautauqua	
Cedar Creek Open Spandrel Bridge		1928	2026-09-29	Mont Ida; 38°12′47.1″N 95°20′48.3″W	Anderson	Concrete arch
Chapman Creek Pratt Truss Bridge		1905	2003-05-09	Chapman; 39°0′31″N 97°2′12″W	Dickinson	Pratt Truss
Chicken Creek Bridge		ca. 1913	1990-03-05	Lone Star; 38°51′11″N 95°20′35″W	Douglas	Masonry arch
Clear Creek Camel Truss Bridge		1930	2003-05-09	Baileyville; 39°56′22″N 96°11′33″W	Nemaha	Camelback Truss
Clements Stone Arch Bridge	Clements Stone Arch Bridge	1886	1976-12-12	Clements; 38°17′42″N 96°44′5″W	Chase	
Conroe Bridge		1925	1983-03-10	Junction City; 39°2′56″N 96°43′51″W	Geary	
Cottonwood River Bridge		1914	1985-07-02	Cottonwood Falls; 38°22′30″N 96°32′26″W	Chase	Filled Spandrel
Cottonwood River Pratt Truss Bridge		1916	2003-05-09	Cedar Point; 38°15′36″N 96°50′2″W	Chase	Pratt Truss
County Line Bowstring	County Line Bowstring	1876	1990-01-04	Hollis, Wayne; 39°39′12″N 97°34′21″W	Cloud, Republic	Bowstring pony truss
Cowley County Poor Farm Stone Arch Culvert		1908	2026-09-29	Winfield; 37°13′21.6″N 96°58′23.1″W	Cowley	Stone culvert
Creamery Bridge	Creamery Bridge	1931	1983-03-10	Osawatomie; 38°30′11″N 94°57′18″W	Miami	
Delaware River Composite Truss Bridge		1936	2003-05-09	Valley Falls; 39°21′3″N 95°27′17″W	Jefferson	Parker Truss
Delaware River Parker Truss Bridge		1926	2003-05-09	Perry; 39°4′30″N 95°24′10″W	Jefferson	Parker Truss
Delaware River Warren Truss Bridge		1913	2004-06-09	Fairview; 39°46′59″N 95°42′50″W	Brown	Warren Truss
Dewlen-Spohnhauer Bridge		1928	1983-03-10	Independence; 37°13′28″N 95°40′43″W	Montgomery	
Doniphan County Waddell		ca. 1900	1990-01-04	Doniphan; 39°38′38″N 95°3′15″W	Doniphan	Waddell A truss
East Badger Creek Culvert		1906	2015-12-29	Winfield; 37°12′55.0″N 96°54′33.0″W	Cowley	Stone culvert
East Fork Wolf Creek Pratt Truss Bridge		1899	2003-05-09	Delhi; 39°8′52″N 98°34′5″W	Osborne	Pratt Truss
East Stone Arch Bridge - Lake Wabaunsee		1938	2009-12-30	Eskridge	Wabaunsee	Stone arch
East Riley Creek Bridge		1899	1989-11-28	Belleville	Republic	Pratt through truss
Eight Mile Creek Warren Truss Bridge		by 1920	2003-05-09	Ottawa; 38°37′52″N 95°17′8″W	Franklin	Warren Truss
Elk Falls Pratt Truss Bridge		1892, 1893	1994-05-06	Elk Falls; 37°22′27″N 96°11′2″W	Elk	Pratt Truss
Esch's Spur Bridge		ca. 1915	1985-07-02	Dexter; 37°8′7″N 96°46′52″W	Cowley	Stone Arch
Fort Fletcher Stone Arch Bridge		1936	2001-05-18	Walker; 38°47′53″N 99°4′39″W	Ellis	Masonry/stone arch bridge
Four Mile Creek Lattice		ca. 1890	1990-01-04	Wilsey; 38°36′33″N 96°39′21″W	Morris	Lattice pony truss
Fox Creek Stone Arch Bridge		1898	2006-12-27	Strong City; 38°24′8″N 96°32′54″W	Chase	stone arch bridge
Hackberry Creek Bridge		1930	1985-07-02	Jetmore; 38°14′15″N 100°8′6″W	Hodgeman	Open Spandrel
Harris Bridge		1916	1985-07-02	Americus; 38°33′1″N 96°20′6″W	Lyon	Filled Spandrel
Hitschmann Cattle Underpass Bridge		1941	2008-03-16	Hitschmann	Barton	WPA Stone Arch Bridge
Hitschmann Double Arch Bridge		1941	2008-03-16	Hitschmann	Barton	WPA Stone Arch Bridge
Hobbs Creek Truss Leg Bedstead Bridge		1904	2004-10-12	Gypsum; 38°38′17″N 97°22′59″W	Saline	Truss Leg Bedstead
Hudgeon Bridge		1923	1985-07-02	Girard; 37°22′8″N 94°53′56″W	Crawford	Filled Spandrel
Independence Bowstring		1871	1990-01-04	Independence; 37°13′29″N 95°41′37″W	Montgomery	Bowstring through truss
Jack Creek Kingpost		ca. 1900	1990-01-04	Long Island; 39°56′26″N 99°26′25″W	Phillips	Kingpost truss
Jake's Branch of Middle Creek Bridge		1914	1985-07-02	Louisburg; 38°31′11″N 94°42′57″W	Miami	Reinforced Concrete Arch
Jefferson Old Town Bowstring Truss		1875	1990-01-04	Oskaloosa; 39°12′48″N 95°18′31″W	Jefferson	Bowstring pony truss
Jenkins Culvert		1938	2013-12-03	Gove City; 38°52′25.3″N 100°41′52.1″W	Gove	Stone culvert
Labette Creek Tributary Bridge		1915	1985-07-02	Parsons; 37°20′38″N 95°19′33″W	Labette	Reinforced Concrete Arch
Lakewood Park Bridge		1887	2004-06-09	Salina; 38°50′28″N 97°35′22″W	Saline	Platt Truss
Landers Creek Bridge		ca. 1917	1985-07-02	Goodrich; 38°16′50″N 94°59′30″W	Linn	Stone Arch
Little Walnut Creek Bowstring		ca. 1880	1990-01-04	Walnut; 37°38′43″N 95°2′45″W	Crawford	Bowstring pony truss
Little Walnut River Pratt Truss Bridge	Little Walnut River Pratt Truss Bridge	1885	2003-05-09	Bois D'Arc; 37°35′46″N 96°55′24″W	Butler	Pratt Truss
Long Shoals Bridge		1902	1990-01-04	Fulton; 37°59′42″N 94°37′18″W	Bourbon	Parker through truss Metal Truss Bridges in Kansas 1861–1939 MPS apporoved for move 7/18/2012
Lyon Creek Rainbow Arch		1925	2020-12-22	Wreford; 38°53′05″N 96°54′36″W	Geary	Rainbow Arch
John Mack Bridge		1930, 1931	1992-01-22	Wichita; 37°38′41″N 97°20′7″W	Sedgwick	Rainbow reinforced concrete
Marmaton Bridge		1878, 1879, 1974	1982-05-11	Fort Scott; 37°51′33″N 94°40′14″W	Bourbon	
Maxwell's Slough Bridge		1924	1985-07-02	St. Paul; 37°30′18″N 95°10′49″W	Neosho	Filled Spandrel
McCauley Bridge		1915	1985-07-02	Auburn; 38°53′49″N 95°48′53″W	Shawnee	Filled Spandrel
Middle Creek Tributary Bridge		ca. 1930	1985-07-02	Princeton; 38°29′32″N 95°22′33″W	Franklin	Stone Arch
Mine Creek Bridge		1927	1983-03-10	Mound City; 38°8′29″N 94°41′42″W	Linn	
Minisa Bridge		ca. 1932	2026-02-17	Wichita; 37°42′28.6″N 97°20′45.9″W	Sedgwick	Concrete stringer
Morton County WPA Bridge		1936	1986-10-22	Richfield; 37°19′5″N 101°53′54″W	Morton	Stone arch bridge
Muddy Creek Bridge		1910	1985-07-02	Douglass; 37°32′3″N 96°57′4″W	Butler	Reinforced Concrete Arch
Mulberry Creek Truss Bridge		1906	2026-04-13	Dodge City; 37°36′04.8″N 99°48′33.0″W	Ford	Pratt truss; two spans
Neosho River Bridge		1926	1983-03-10	Hartford; 38°18′31″N 95°56′52″W	Coffey	
Ness County Bridge FS-450		ca. 1935	2017-03-27	Bazine; 38°17′26.7″N 99°44′18.0″W	Ness	Stone arch
North Branch Otter Creek Bridge		1908	1985-07-02	Piedmont; 37°41′28″N 96°22′46″W	Greenwood	Stone Arch
North Fork Solomon River Lattice Truss Bridge		1925	2003-05-09	Lenora; 39°36′30″N 100°1′48″W	Norton	Lattice Truss
North Gypsum Creek Truss Leg Bedstead Bridge		1902	2003-05-09	Roxbury; 38°32′12″N 97°28′39″W	McPherson	Truss Leg Bedstead
North Rock Creek Masonry Arch Bridge		ca. 1936 - 1941	2014-07-25	Hunter; 39°15′47.6″N 98°18′49.8″W	Mitchell	Stone arch
Old Katy Bridge		1895, 1908, 1913	2003-05-09	Wreford; 38°57′18″N 96°50′46″W	Geary	Pratt Truss
Onion Creek Bridge	Onion Creek Bridge	1911	1990-01-04	Coffeyville; 37°1′33″N 95°39′23″W	Montgomery	Parker through truss
Otter Creek Bridge		1936	1990-01-04	Cedar Vale; 37°9′19″N 96°29′55″W	Chautauqua	Camelback through truss
Parsons Filled Arch Bridge		1915	1985-07-02	Parsons; 37°19′9″N 95°13′51″W	Labette	Filled Spandrel
Pawnee River Tributary Bridge		ca. 1928	1985-07-02	Bazine; 38°19′21″N 99°41′42″W	Ness	Stone Arch
Pennsylvania Avenue Rock Creek Bridge		1911	1985-07-02	Independence; 37°12′51″N 95°42′24″W	Montgomery	Reinforced Concrete Arch
Polecat Creek Bridge		ca. 1901	1985-07-02	Douglass; 37°29′23″N 97°6′33″W	Butler	Stone Arch
Pottawatomie Creek Bridge		1932	1983-03-10	Osawatomie; 38°29′7″N 94°57′2″W	Miami	
Pott's Ford Bridge		1884	1990-01-04	Glasco; 39°21′1″N 97°51′15″W	Cloud	Pratt through truss
Pumpkin Creek Tributary Bridge		ca. 1915	1985-07-02	Mound Valley; 37°12′24″N 95°26′19″W	Labette	Reinforced Concrete Arch
Republican River Pegram Truss	Republic River Pegram Truss	1893	1990-01-04	Concordia; 39°35′46″N 97°34′16″W	Cloud	Pegram through truss
Riley Creek Bridge		1899	1990-01-04	Belleville; 39°47′16″N 97°37′56″W	Republic	Pratt through truss
Robidoux Creek Pratt Truss Bridge		1910	2003-05-22	Frankfort; 39°43′33″N 96°26′26″W	Marshall	Pratt Truss
Rocky Ford Bridge		ca. 1890	2020-12-22	Emporia; 38°21′57.0″N 96°06′53.6″W	Lyon	Pratt through truss
Rush County Line Bridge		1936	1986-11-04	Otis; 38°28′49″N 99°29′10″W	Rush	Stone arch bridge
Salt Creek Truss Leg Bedstead Bridge		1903	2003-05-09	Barnard; 39°12′17″N 98°2′57″W	Lincoln	Truss Leg Bedstead
Sand Creek Tributary Stone Arch Bridge		1942	2014-04-07	La Crosse; 38°33′35.6″N 99°20′49.1″W	Rush	Stone arch
Sand Creek Truss Leg Bedstead Bridge		1906	2003-05-09	Lenora; 39°39′13″N 99°54′1″W	Norton	Truss Leg Bedstead
Shawnee Street Overpass		1932, 1934	1984-03-08	Kansas City; 39°4′19″N 94°37′15″W	Wyandotte	Open spandrel arch
Silver Creek Bridge		ca. 1908, ca. 1909	1987-01-30	Winfield; 37°12′3″N 96°50′34″W	Cowley	Double arch bridge
Soden's Grove Bridge		1923	1983-03-10	Emporia; 38°23′9″N 96°10′54″W	Lyon	
Southeast Stone Arch Bridge - Lake Wabaunsee		1938	2009-12-30	Eskridge	Wabaunsee	Stone arch
Spencer's Crossing Bridge		1885	1990-01-04	Greeley; 38°22′39″N 95°8′51″W	Anderson	Pratt through truss
Spring Creek Stone Arch Bridge		ca. 1935	2023-10-10	Arkansas City; 37°06′00.0″N 97°05′06.0″W	Cowley	Stone arch
Spring Creek Tributary Bridge		ca. 1930	1985-07-02	Lincoln; 38°54′32″N 98°14′38″W	Lincoln	Stone Arch
State Street Bridge		ca. 1924	1985-07-02	Erie; 37°34′21″N 95°14′25″W	Neosho	Reinforced Concrete Arch
Stranger Creek Warren Truss Bridge		1925	2004-10-12	Farmington; 39°30′41″N 95°18′36″W	Atchison	Warren Truss, Polygonal
Tauy Creek Bridge		1895	1990-10-25	Ottawa; 38°39′53″N 95°13′23″W	Franklin	Warren truss
Thomas Arch Bridge		ca. 1916	1990-05-10	Auburn; 38°52′30″N 95°45′41″W	Shawnee	Masonry Arch
Township Line Bridge		1916	1985-07-02	Rozel; 38°12′18″N 99°27′35″W	Pawnee	Filled Spandrel
Verdigris River Bridge		1926	1985-07-02	Madison; 38°8′46″N 96°8′19″W	Greenwood	Open Spandrel
Vermillion Creek Tributary Stone Arch Bridge	Vermillion Creek Tributary Stone Arch Bridge	ca. 1915	1986-10-22	Onaga; 39°25′10″N 96°8′45″W	Pottawatomie	Single span stone arch
Walnut Creek Bridge		ca. 1920	1985-07-02	Wellsville; 38°41′18″N 95°5′5″W	Franklin	Reinforced Concrete Arch
Walnut Creek Bridge		1887	1990-01-04	Heizer; 38°25′54″N 98°53′40″W	Barton	Pratt through truss
Walnut Creek Tributary Bridge		1934	1985-07-02	Nekoma; 38°41′48″N 99°2′29″W	Rush	Reinforced Concrete Arch
Washington County Kingpost		ca. 1900	1990-01-04	Barnes; 39°38′20″N 96°51′28″W	Washington	King post truss
Wea Creek Bowstring Arch Truss Bridge		1870	2003-05-09	Topeka; 39°3′21″N 95°46′40″W	Shawnee	Bowstring Truss
West Sappa Creek Lattice		ca. 1900	1990-01-04	Norton; 39°59′13″N 100°5′54″W	Norton	Lattice Pony Truss
Wilson Pratt Truss Bridge		1904	2009-01-22	Chapman	Dickinson	Pratt truss
Belvidere Medicine River Bridge		1913	removed 2000-06-14	Belvidere	Kiowa	Reinforced Concrete Arch
Bridge No. 650-Federal Aid Highway System Bridge		1940	2008-7-8 removed 2018-03-26	Beaver	Barton	
Schleichers Branch Stone Arch Bridge		ca. 1898-1900	removed 2004-02-25	Humboldt	Allen	Masonry Arch Bridge
