= National Register of Historic Places listings in Barton County, Kansas =

Location of Barton County in Kansas

This is a list of the National Register of Historic Places listings in Barton County, Kansas.

This is intended to be a complete list of the properties on the National Register of Historic Places in Barton County, Kansas, United States. The locations of National Register properties for which the latitude and longitude coordinates are included below, may be seen in a map.

There are 20 properties listed on the National Register in the county. Three properties were once listed, but have since been removed.

This National Park Service list is complete through NPS recent listings posted December 12, 2025.

== Current listings ==
	Name on the Register	Image	Date listed	Location	City or town	Description
1	Abel House	Abel House	March 2, 2001 (#01000180)	2601 Paseo Drive; 38°22′39″N 98°46′21″W	Great Bend	
2	A.S. Allen Buildings	A.S. Allen Buildings	January 5, 2018 (#100001944)	1401 Main St. & 2006 Forest; 38°21′56″N 98°45′54″W	Great Bend	
3	Beaver Creek Native Stone Bridge	Beaver Creek Native Stone Bridge	April 16, 2008 (#08000296)	NE. 50 Ave. S. and NE 230 Rd. 38°41′42″N 98°40′58″W	Beaver	
4	Bridge No. 218-Off System Bridge	Bridge No. 218-Off System Bridge	April 16, 2008 (#08000297)	NE. 60 Ave. S. and NE. 220 Rd. 38°40′53″N 98°39′59″W	Beaver	
5	Bridge No. 222-Off System Bridge	Bridge No. 222-Off System Bridge	July 2, 2008 (#08000608)	NE. 60 Ave., S. and NE. 210 Rd., 1/8 mile east on 210 Rd. 38°40′01″N 98°39′50″W	Beaver	
6	Bridge No. 640-Federal Aid Highway System Bridge	Bridge No. 640-Federal Aid Highway System Bridge	July 2, 2008 (#08000611)	NE 60 Ave., 1/8 mile north of NE 210 Rd. 38°40′03″N 98°39′51″W	Beaver	
7	Crest Theater	Crest Theater	February 9, 2005 (#05000003)	1905 Lakin Ave. 38°21′59″N 98°45′50″W	Great Bend	
8	Great Bend Army Air Field Hangar	Great Bend Army Air Field Hangar	October 5, 2015 (#15000686)	9047 6th St. 38°20′50″N 98°51′12″W	Great Bend	
8	Great Bend Central Business District	Great Bend Central Business District	July 21, 2022 (#100007923)	Roughly bounded by buildings fronting all sides of the courthouse square; 1100 and 1200 blks. of Kansas Ave., 1024, 1104-1222 Main St., 1200 and 1300 blks., 1409 Williams St., 2006-2111 Forest Ave. 38°21′56″N 98°45′54″W	Great Bend	
9	High Rise Apartments	High Rise Apartments	September 23, 2020 (#100005621)	1101 Kansas Ave. 38°21′45″N 98°45′50″W	Great Bend	
10	Hoisington High School	Hoisington High School	November 15, 2005 (#05001248)	218 E. 7th St. 38°31′13″N 98°46′34″W	Hoisington	
11	Manweiler-Maupin Chevrolet	Manweiler-Maupin Chevrolet	October 9, 2012 (#12000842)	271 S. Main St. 38°30′43″N 98°46′40″W	Hoisington	Part of the Roadside Kansas MPS
12	Nagel House	Nagel House	March 2, 2001 (#01000181)	1411 Wilson St. 38°21′58″N 98°47′44″W	Great Bend	
13	Norden Bombsight Storage Vaults	Norden Bombsight Storage Vaults	October 5, 2015 (#15000687)	9047 6th St. 38°20′47″N 98°51′10″W	Great Bend	Part of the Norden bombsight program
14	Pawnee Rock	Pawnee Rock	December 29, 1970 (#70000247)	0.2 miles north of Pawnee Rock off U.S. 56; 38°16′20″N 98°58′53″W	Pawnee Rock	
15	US Post Office-Hoisington	US Post Office-Hoisington	October 17, 1989 (#89001642)	121 E. 2nd St. 38°30′53″N 98°46′35″W	Hoisington	
16	Walnut Creek Bridge	Walnut Creek Bridge	January 4, 1990 (#89002178)	Over Walnut Creek, northwest of Heizer; 38°25′54″N 98°53′40″W	Heizer	
17	Walnut Creek Crossing		April 26, 1972 (#72000488)	Along Walnut Creek above its confluence with the Arkansas River, east of Great Bend; 38°21′28″N 98°42′07″W	Great Bend Township	
18	Wolf Hotel	Wolf Hotel	November 7, 2002 (#02001295)	104 E. Santa Fe; 38°21′13″N 98°34′50″W	Ellinwood	
19	Wolf Park Band Shell	Wolf Park Band Shell	August 4, 2003 (#03000706)	Lots 12 and 13, Block 2, 200 block of N. Main; 38°21′23″N 98°34′49″W	Ellinwood	

== Former listings ==
	Name on the Register	Image	Date listed	Date removed	Location	City or town	Description
1	Bridge No. 650-Federal Aid Highway System Bridge	Bridge No. 650-Federal Aid Highway System Bridge	July 2, 2008 (#08000612)	March 26, 2018	NE 60 Ave., 1/12 mile south of NE 220 Rd. 38°40′52″N 98°39′51″W	Beaver	Apparently no longer extant
2	Hitschmann Cattle Underpass Bridge		April 16, 2008 (#08000298)	July 7, 2015	NE. 110 Ave. S. & NE. 190 Rd. 38°38′16″N 98°34′20″W	Hitschmann	
3	Hitschmann Double Arch Bridge		April 16, 2008 (#08000299)	July 7, 2015	NE. 110 Ave. S. & NE. 190 Rd. 38°38′16″N 98°34′20″W	Hitschmann	

== See also ==
- List of National Historic Landmarks in Kansas
- National Register of Historic Places listings in Kansas
