= Paul Turner (American football coach) =

American football player and coach (1922–2004)

Biographical details
- Born: March 5, 1922
- Died: October 4, 2004 (aged 82); Bella Vista, Arkansas, U.S.

Playing career

Football
- 1942: Kansas
- 1945: Oberlin
- 1946: Kansas

Basketball
- 1942–1943: Kansas
- Position: End (football)

Coaching career (HC unless noted)

Football
- 1947–1948: Hoisington HS (KS)
- 1949–1953: Abilene HS (KS)
- 1954: Highland Park HS (KS)
- 1955–1957: Washburn (line)
- 1958–1959: Northwest Missouri State
- 1960–1969: Newton HS (IA)

Basketball
- 1955–1958: Washburn (assistant)

Track and field
- 1949–1954: Abilene HS (KS)

Head coaching record
- Overall: 3–11–2 (college football)

Jesse Paul Turner (March 5, 1922 – October 4, 2004) was American college football coach. He served as head football coach at Northwest Missouri State College—now known as Northwest Missouri State University—in Maryville, Missouri for two seasons, from 1958 to 1959, and compiling a record of 3–11–2.

Turner graduated from Shawnee Mission High School in 1940. He then attended the University of Kansas, where he lettered in basketball under Phog Allen during the 1942–43 season. He also lettered in football at Kansas, in 1942 under Gwinn Henry and in 1946 under George Sauer. During World War II, Turned served in the United States Navy and played football at Oberlin College under Lysle K. Butler.

After graduating from the University of Kansas in 1947, Turner began his coaching career at Hoisington High School in Hoisington, Kansas. Two years later, he was hired as the head football and track coach at Abilene High School in Abilene, Kansas. Turned left Abilene in 1954 to move on to a similar position at Highland Park High School in Topeka, Kansas.

In 1955, Turner was appointed line coach for the football team at Washburn University under head coach Dick Godlove. He also served as an assistant basketball and track coach at Washburn before succeeding Ryland Milner as head football coach at Northwest Missouri State in 1958. After two season at Northwest Missouri State, Turned resigned, in 1960, to become head football coach and assistant basketball and track coach at Newton High School in Newton, Iowa. He continued to coach at Newton through the 1969 season.

Turner died on October 4, 2004, in Bella Vista, Arkansas.

== Head coaching record ==
=== College football ===
Year	Team	Overall	Conference	Standing	Bowl/playoffs
Northwest Missouri State Bearcats (Missouri Intercollegiate Athletic Association) (1958–1959)
1958	Northwest Missouri State	0–8	0–5	6th	
1959	Northwest Missouri State	3–3–2	2–2–1	3rd	
Northwest Missouri State:		3–11–2	2–7–1		
Total:		3–11–2			
