= Morton County WPA Bridge =

- U.S. National Register of Historic Places
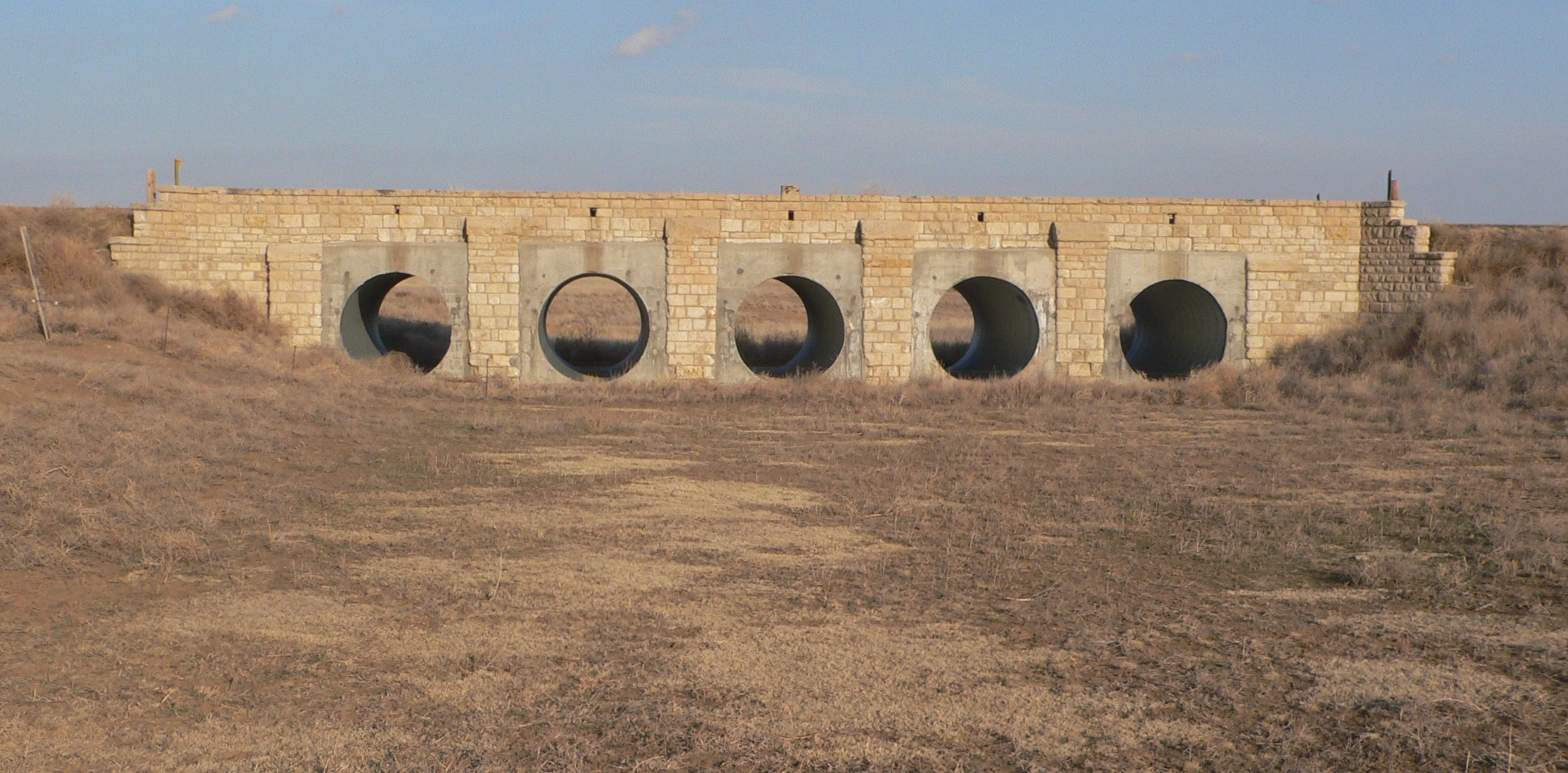
- View from upstream (west)

- Location within Kansas Location within the United States
- Nearest city: Richfield, Kansas
- Coordinates: 37.318208°N 101.900616°W
- Built: 1939
- Built by: W.P.A.
- Architectural style: Stone arch bridge
- MPS: Masonry Arch Bridges of Kansas TR
- NRHP reference No.: 86003356
- Added to NRHP: October 22, 1986

The Morton County WPA Bridge, near Richfield, Kansas, United States, is a stone multi-arch bridge that was built from 1936 to 1939 by the Works Progress Administration (WPA). It was listed on the National Register of Historic Places in 1986.

According to its NRHP nomination, it was deemed significant due to its use of distinctive construction methods which are no longer in use including "supported by a stone arch which is loaded by an earthen fill which in turn, is retained by stone spandrel walls." It was also credited for maintaining the "integrity of location, design, setting, materials, feeling and association."
