= Kathryn Eames =

American actress (1908–2004)

Kathryn Eames (July 25, 1908 – December 12, 2004) was an American cinema, television and stage actress. She worked for more than 50 years as an actress.

== Early life ==
Eames was the youngest daughter of Lorenzo and Katie Bridenstine, who had four more children. She grew up in Hoisington, Kansas.

As a child she would be in every play she could. Her mother, who gave poetry readings, painted china and theorems, insisted that each of her children learn a musical instrument. Eames learned how to play the violin, something which she'd keep doing, with the violin she was given as a child by her father, until she was very old.

As a young bride she had an automobile accident, recuperating from which gave her some extra time to enroll in classes at the University of Arizona where she chose drama, thinking she might enjoy writing a play someday. Instead, she moved quickly into acting. In 1940, she won the National Collegiate Players Award for her portrayal of Lillom in The Typewriter. The award included a chance to train in White Plains, New York with Madam Tamara Daykarhanova and Michael Chekhov who gave her a scholarship to continue study in the fall.

== Acting career ==
Eames chose her mother's maiden name for her stage name, packed her bags, and left home to pursue her acting career. Her first professional appearance was in the Broadway production of Winged Victory. For over 50 years, she appeared on Broadway, Off Broadway, on radio, television and film. She worked in regional theatre, stock packages, dinner theatre and industrial shows. She had a role in Bob Hope Presents the Chrysler Theatre. Her last work in Broadway and theatre was in 1992, in Democracy and Esther at the Triangle Theater. She continued to act in commercials and plays such as The Last Resort well into her 80s.

Eames toured in The Cat and the Canary, Anniversary Waltz, Marat/Sade, and Morning's at Seven which played in Stephens Auditorium at Iowa State University. She was a guest artist in various university productions including Henry IV (parts 1 and 2), Le Roi se meurt, and Ah! Wilderness.

She was able to work with quite a few notable actors during her career. Eames often worked with Groucho Marx, who would always ask her to play opposite him whenever he performed in Time for Elizabeth. She played with Shirley Booth in The Torchbearers, with George Montgomery in Toys in the Attic and with Rita Moreno in I Am a Camera. She was also featured with Kaye Ballard, Eddie Bracken, Tom Ewell, Virginia Mayo, Ian Keith, Robert Alda and Gloria DeHaven.

Eames returned to Iowa State University, where a theatre scholarship would be established in her name, in 1992 as artist in residence. There she taught students how to deal with things such as auditions and working in television.

== Death ==
Eames died at age 96 on December 12, 2004 in a nursing home in Joplin, Missouri. She was cremated and her ashes were placed with her brother's in Rose Hills Memorial Park in Whittier, California.

== Personal life ==
She was a member of the Screen Actors Guild and the American Federation of Television and Radio Artists. Her residence was an apartment in New York City she acquired in the 1940s. Despite not having many major roles, she could support herself almost entirely through acting because of her unusual versatility and willingness to explore new avenues for performance, as well as the discipline and energy she gave to her work.

Age wasn't something which could refrain Eames from doing certain activities. In her 60s, she enrolled in tap dancing lessons and in her 70s, she took French lessons.

== Roles ==
=== Cinema ===
Eames appeared in the following cinema movies:

- Coop
- The Big Heat (1953) - Marge (Bannion's sister-in-law) (uncredited)
- Diary of a Mad Housewife (1970)
- Roseland (1977)
- Starlight: A Musical Movie (1988) - Louise (final film role)

=== Stage ===
These are the stage plays in which Eames worked:

- Ah! Wilderness
- Anniversary Waltz
- Beyond the Horizon
- Book of Job
- Church Street
- Democracy and Esther (1992)
- Escape Me Never
- Henry IV, Part 1
- Henry IV, Part 2
- Home Room
- Hot House
- I Am a Camera
- In White America
- Lamp at Midnight
- Le Roi se meurt
- Marat/Sade
- Morning's at Seven
- Portrait of a Madonna
- The Brothel
- The Cat and the Canary
- The Last Resort (1988) - Isabel
- The Torchbearers
- Time for Elizabeth
- Toys in the Attic
- Winged Victory

=== Television ===
She acted in the following television productions:

- Another World
- Armstrong Theater
- Bob Hope Presents the Chrysler Theatre, chapter "Time for Elizabeth" (1964) - Kay Davis
- Day in Court
- I Spy
- Lamp Unto My Feet
- Look Up and Live
- Love of Life
- Loving
- Sgt. Bilko
- The Secret Storm
