= Elk Falls Pratt Truss Bridge =

- U.S. National Register of Historic Places
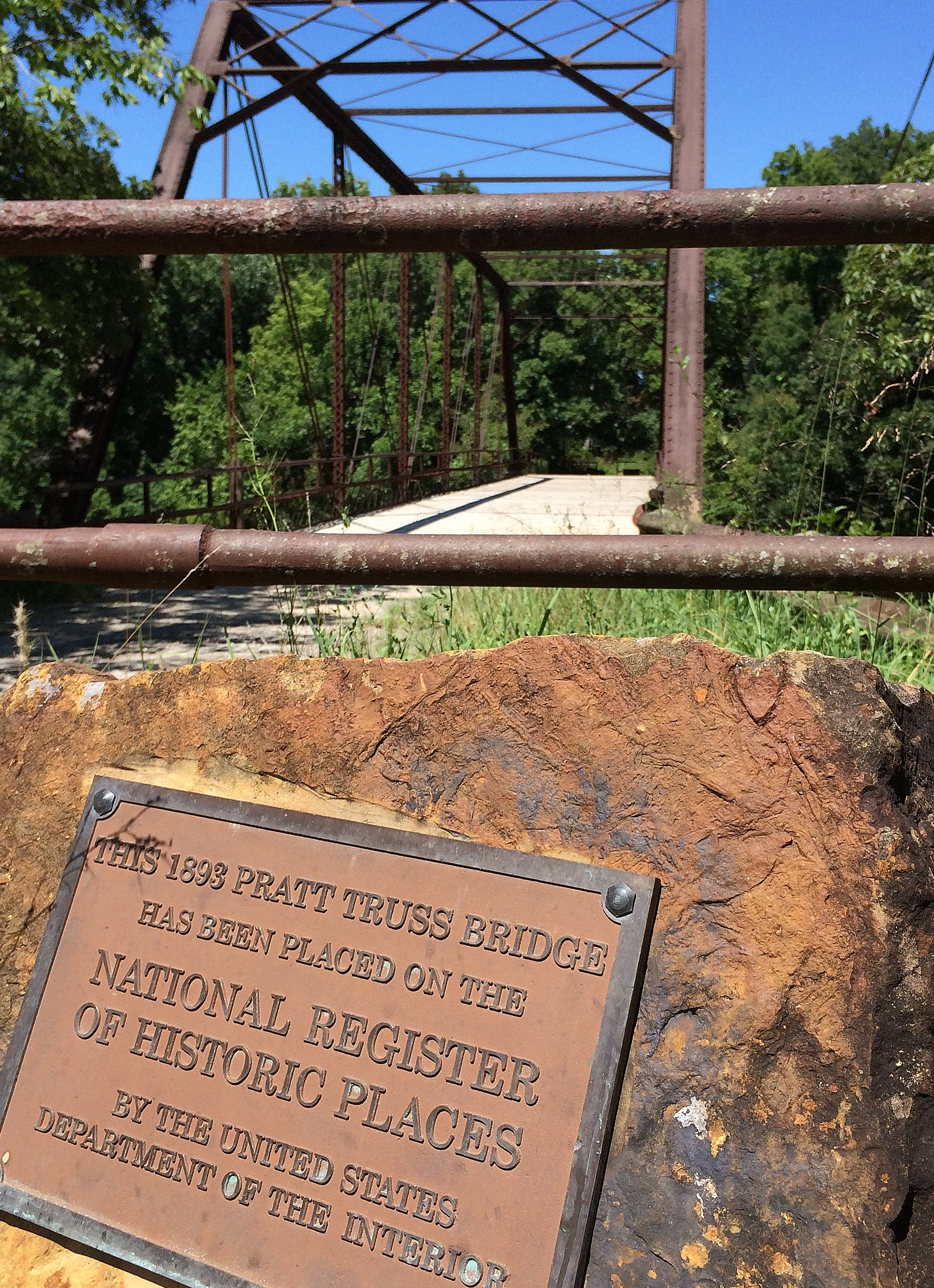

- Location within Kansas Location within the United States
- Nearest city: Elk Falls, Kansas
- Coordinates: 37°22′27″N 96°11′02″W
- Area: less than one acre
- Built: 1892
- Built by: George E. King Bridge Co.
- Architectural style: Pratt Truss
- MPS: Metal Truss Bridges in Kansas 1861--1939 MPS
- NRHP reference No.: 94000403
- Added to NRHP: May 6, 1994

The Elk Falls Pratt Truss Bridge, near Elk Falls, Kansas, spans the Elk River at the east end of Montgomery St. It was built in 1892 and was listed on the National Register of Historic Places in 1994.

It is a Pratt truss bridge built by the George E. King Bridge Co. The bridge was taken out of service in the 1970s and, in 1992, was in the process of some restoration. It was open for pedestrian use.
