= East Badger Creek Culvert =

- U.S. National Register of Historic Places
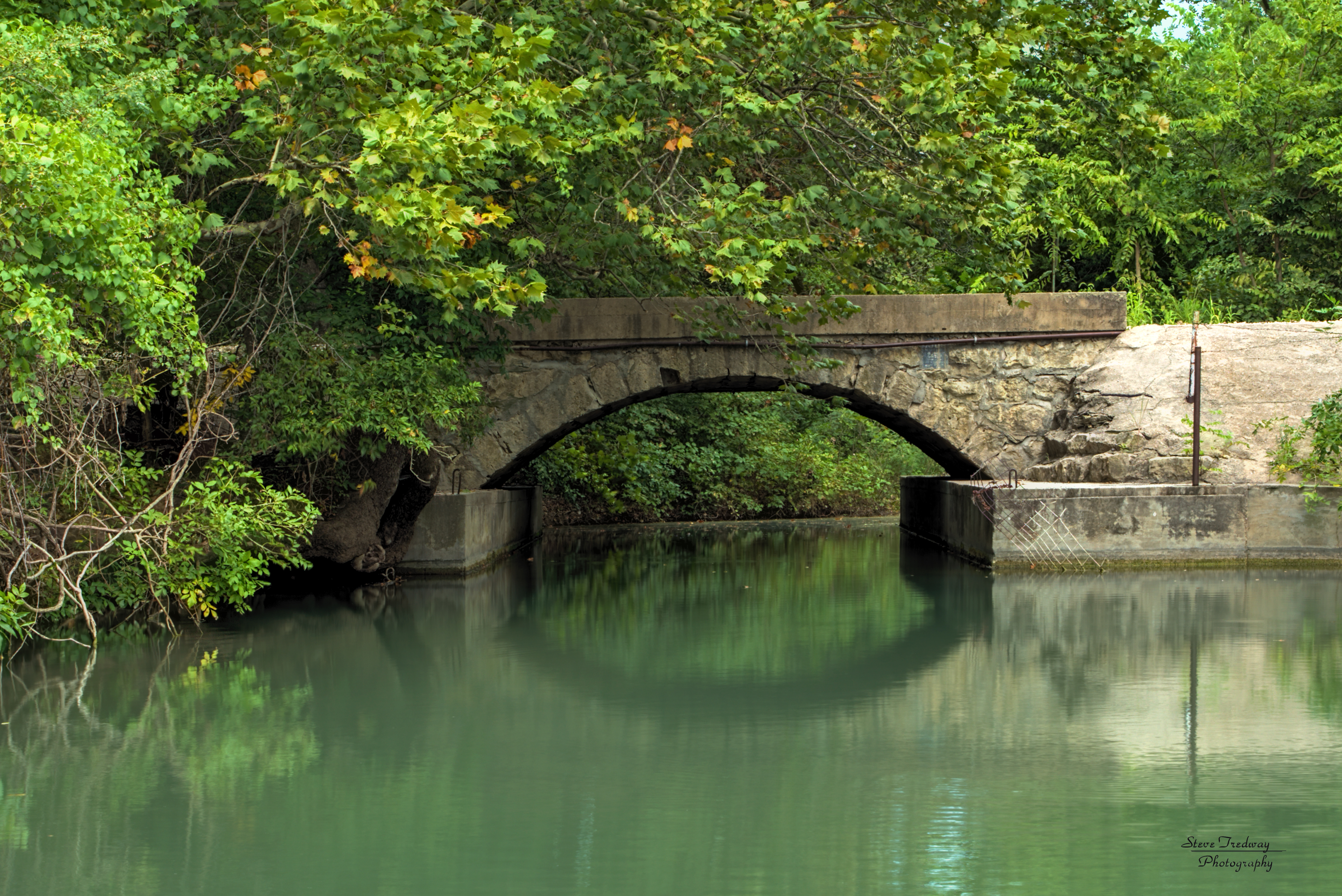

- Location within Kansas Location within the United States
- Location: 182nd Rd. approx. .3 mi. E. of 131st Rd., Winfield, Kansas
- Coordinates: 37°12′55″N 96°54′33″W
- Area: less than one acre
- Built: 1905-06
- Architectural style: Stone Arch
- MPS: Masonry Arch Bridges of Kansas TR
- NRHP reference No.: 15000936
- Added to NRHP: December 29, 2015

East Badger Creek Culvert, at 182nd Rd. approx. .3 mi. E. of 131st Rd. in Winfield, Kansas, is a small stone arch bridge built in 1905–06. It has a single arch. The bridge is 29 feet (8.8 m) long and 20 feet (6.1 m) wide.

It was listed on the National Register of Historic Places in 2015.

It was deemed notable as "a small, representative example of several stone arch bridges and culverts built in Kansas in the early 1900s. The culvert retains its character-defining features of limestone arch rings and spandrels that spring from stone abutments."
