= State Street Bridge (Erie, Kansas) =

- U.S. National Register of Historic Places
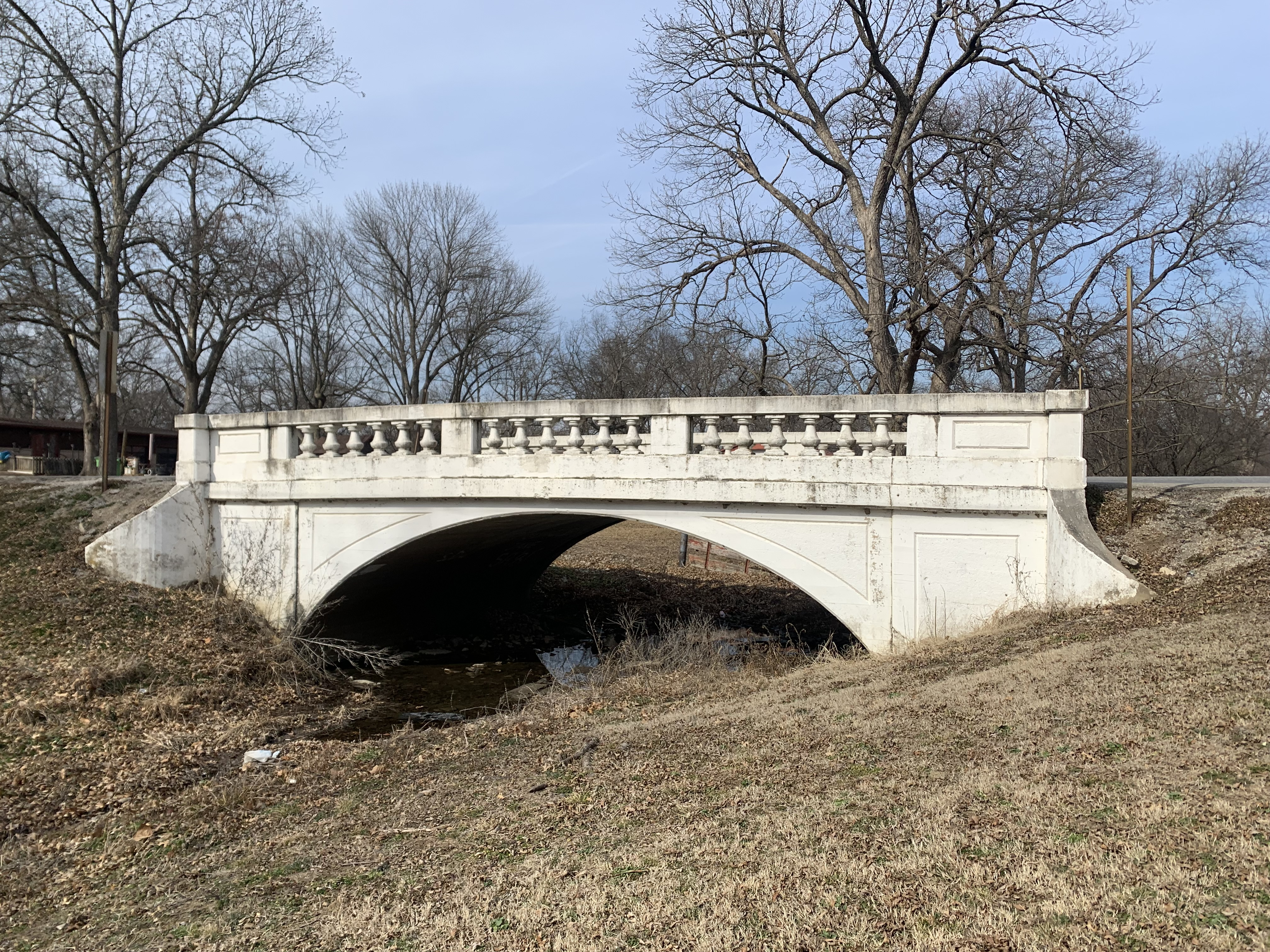

- Location within Kansas Location within the United States
- Location: State St. over Neosho River tributary, Erie, Kansas
- Coordinates: 37°34′21″N 95°14′25″W
- Area: less than one acre
- Built: 1924
- Architectural style: Reinforced Concrete Arch
- MPS: Masonry Arch Bridges of Kansas TR
- NRHP reference No.: 85001441
- Added to NRHP: July 2, 1985

The State Street Bridge in Erie, Kansas brings State Street over a tributary of the Neosho River. It is a reinforced concrete arch bridge which was built in 1924. It was listed on the National Register of Historic Places in 1985.

It has a reinforced concrete arch between concrete abutments. The bridge is 39 feet (12 m) long and has a roadway 21 feet (6.4 m) wide from curb to curb. The roadway is 13 feet (4.0 m) above the stream bed.
