= Wreford, Kansas =

Unincorporated community in Geary County, Kansas

Coordinates: 38°57′42″N 96°50′55″W

Wreford is an unincorporated community in Geary County, Kansas, United States.

== History ==
A post office was opened in Wreford in 1882, and remained in operation until it was discontinued in 1918.

== Demographics ==
Wreford is part of the Manhattan, Kansas Metropolitan Statistical Area.

== Education ==
The community is served by Chapman USD 473 public school district.
