= Esch's Spur Bridge =

- U.S. National Register of Historic Places
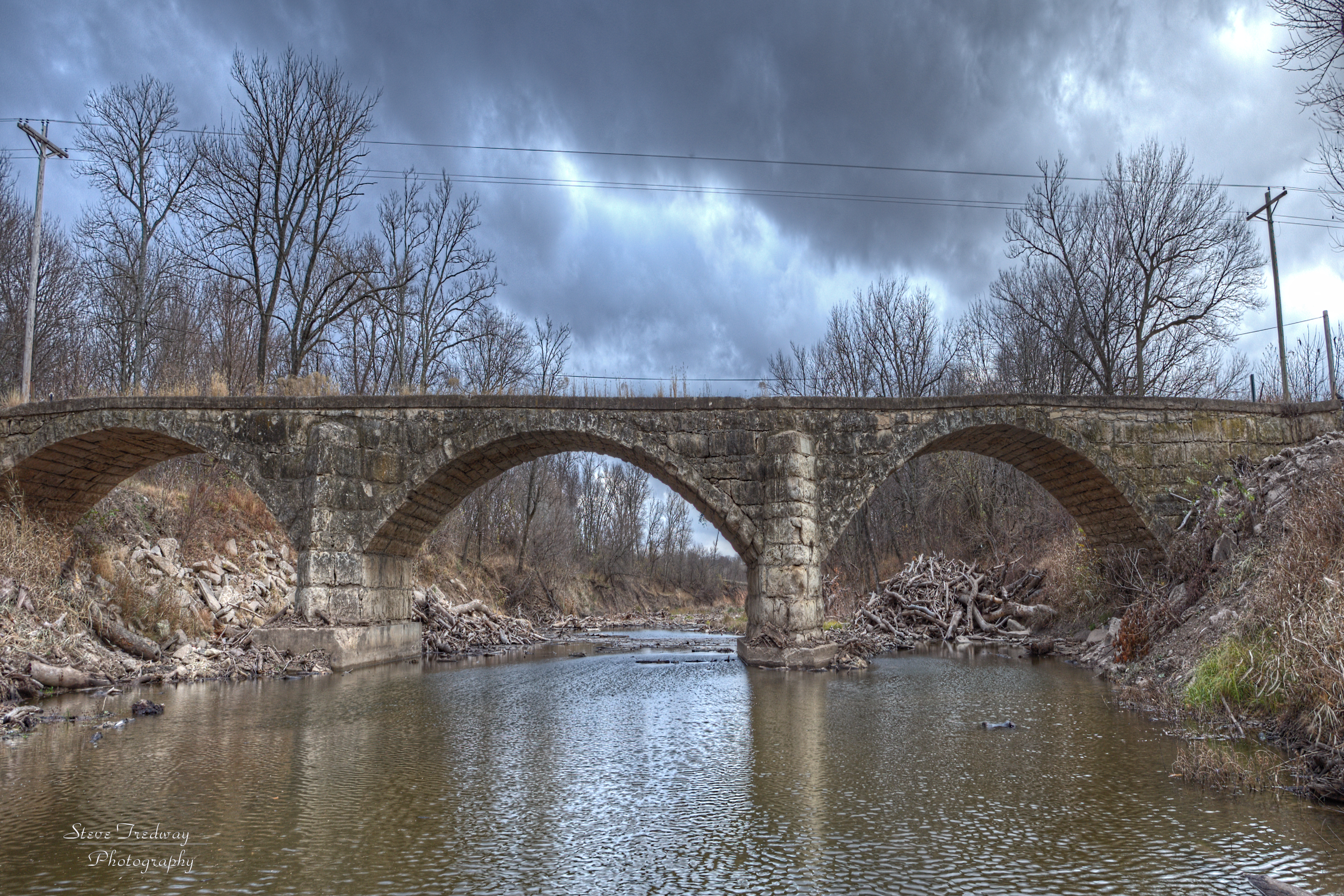

- Location within Kansas Location within the United States
- Location: 3 miles south and 3 miles west of Dexter, Kansas
- Coordinates: 37°08′07″N 96°46′52″W
- Area: less than one acre
- Built: 1915
- Architectural style: Stone Arch
- MPS: Masonry Arch Bridges of Kansas TR
- NRHP reference No.: 85001423
- Added to NRHP: July 2, 1985

Esch's Spur Bridge is a triple span stone arch bridge which crosses Grouse Creek near Dexter, Kansas. It is 182 feet (55 m) long and 13 feet (4.0 m) wide (from curb to curb).

It was listed on the National Register of Historic Places in 1985.
