= Hackberry Creek Bridge =

American bridge

- U.S. National Register of Historic Places
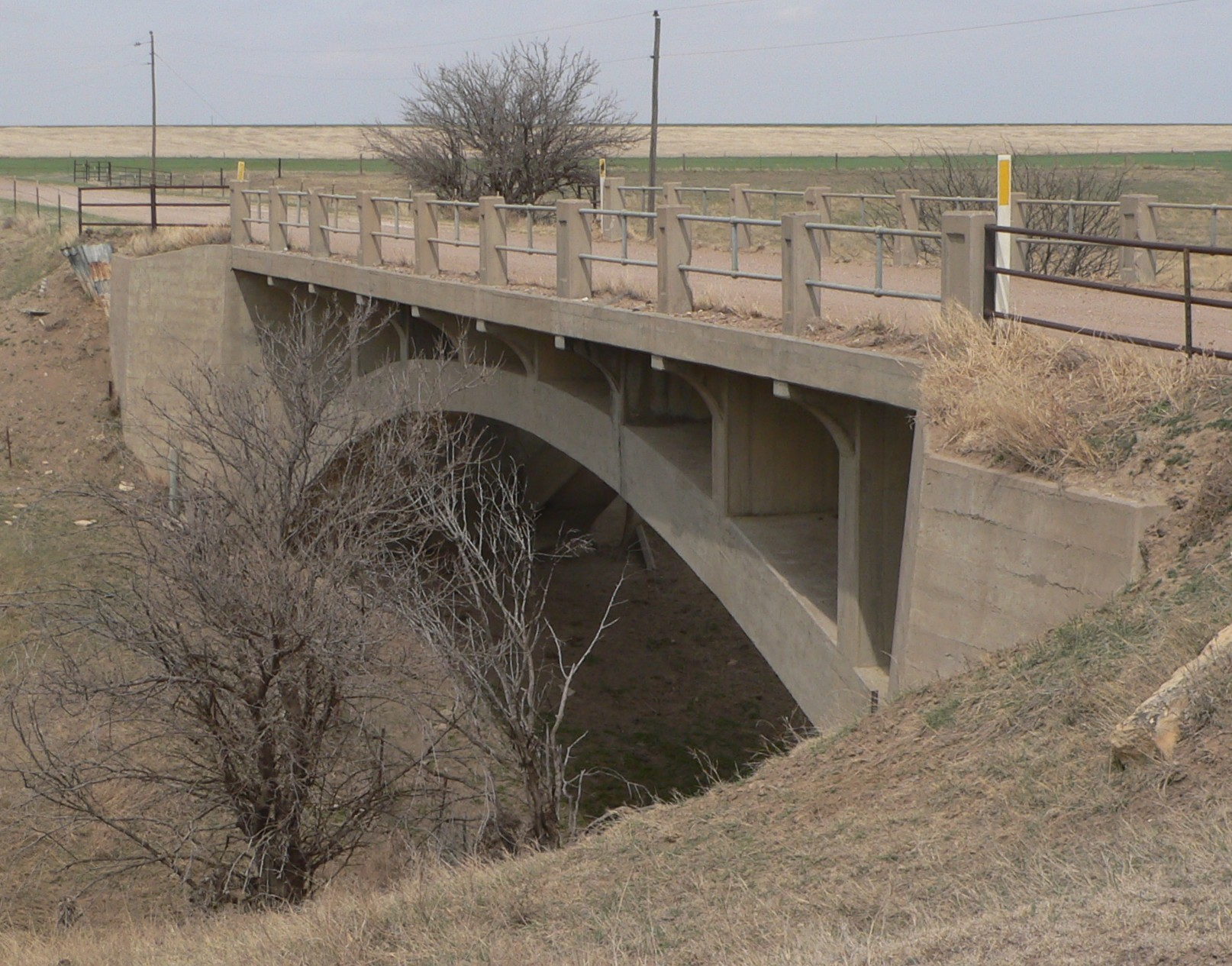
- Bridge in 2016

- Location within Kansas
- Nearest city: Jetmore, Kansas
- Coordinates: 38.2374°N 100.1358°W
- Area: less than one acre
- Built: 1930
- Architectural style: Open Spandrel
- MPS: Masonry Arch Bridges of Kansas TR
- NRHP reference No.: 85001424
- Added to NRHP: July 2, 1985

The Hackberry Creek Bridge, in Hodgeman County, Kansas near Jetmore, Kansas, was built in 1930. It was listed on the National Register of Historic Places in 1985.

It is a single-span open spandrel deck arch bridge, about 93 feet (28 m) long with a 20 feet (6.1 m) wide roadway, with the roadway about 25.75 feet (7.85 m) above normal water level.

It has two concrete arch rings.

It is located 13 miles west and 11 miles north of Jetmore.

It was listed on the National Register as part of a study of masonry arch bridges in Kansas.

The bridge was in "excellent condition" in 1985.
