= Silver Creek Bridge =

- U.S. National Register of Historic Places
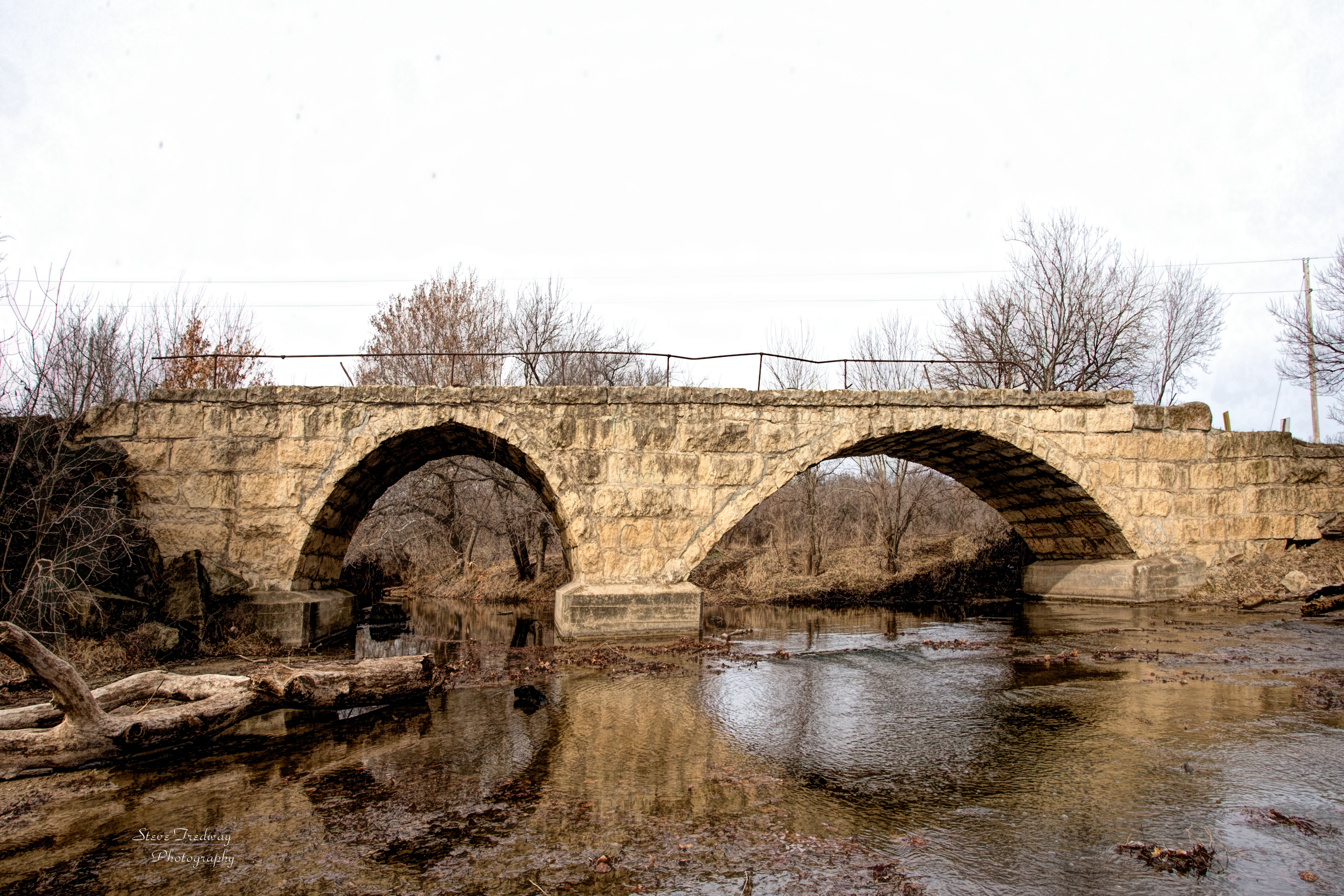

- Location within Kansas Location within the United States
- Location: about 8 miles east and 3 miles south of Winfield, Kansas
- Coordinates: 37°12′03″N 96°50′34″W
- Area: less than one acre
- Built: c.1908-09
- Built by: Liberty Township
- Architectural style: Double arch bridge
- MPS: Masonry Arch Bridges of Kansas TR
- NRHP reference No.: 86003270
- Added to NRHP: January 30, 1987

The Silver Creek Bridge, near Winfield, Kansas, is a double arch bridge that crosses the Walnut River built in c.1908-09. Also known as the Jordan Bridge, it was listed on the National Register of Historic Places in 1987.

It is earth loaded. It is 140 feet (43 m) long and 18 feet (5.5 m) wide and has an iron pipe rail.
