= Bridge 650 (Barton County, Kansas) =

- Bridge #650 - Federal Aid Highway System Bridge
- Formerly listed on the U.S. National Register of Historic Places
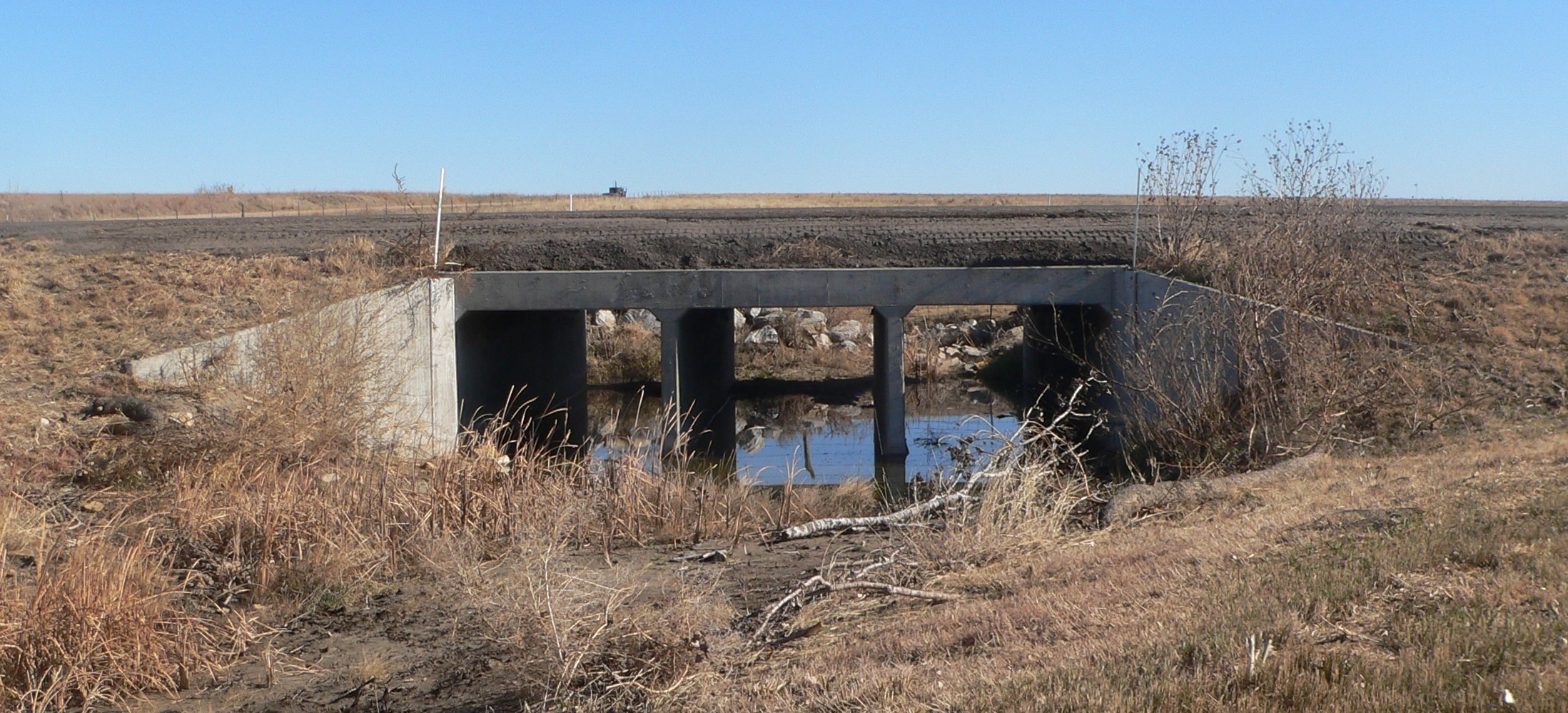
- Concrete box replacing Bridge 650

- Location within Kansas
- Location: North of Beaver, Kansas
- Coordinates: 38.681086°N 98.664264°W
- Built: 1940
- NRHP reference No.: 08000612

Significant dates
- Added to NRHP: July 2, 2008
- Removed from NRHP: March 26, 2018

Bridge 650 was a limestone-and-concrete bridge in rural Barton County in the state of Kansas in the Midwestern United States. The bridge was built by the Works Projects Administration in 1938–40. It was used into the 21st century, and in 2008 was listed in the National Register of Historic Places. However, it was later found inadequate for the volume and weight of traffic that it carried, and demolished in 2016 or 2017. It was delisted in 2018.

== Construction ==
In the late 1930s and early 1940s, the Works Projects Administration (WPA) launched numerous public-works projects to provide employment during the Great Depression. In Kansas, these projects included the construction of hundreds of small bridges, often using locally quarried limestone.

Bridge 650, built across a tributary of Beaver Creek, was one of several such bridges in Barton County. Construction began in 1938. Concrete work was completed in 1940, attested by the inscription "WPA 1940" stamped into the concrete curb.

The bridge consisted of two spans, divided by a central support. The foundation, wingwalls, and central support were made of cut limestone blocks held together by mortar; the deck and guardrails were concrete. The deck was 26 feet (7.9 m) long, with 11-foot (3.4 m) spans between supports, and 24 feet (7.3 m) wide. The base of the deck was 5 feet (1.5 m) above ground level.

== Demolition ==
The bridge remained in use well into the 21st century. In 2007, it was noted that there was "significant deterioration" in the mortar joints in the limestone, and that the wingwalls, which extend along the banks and protect the bridge during high flows, were "temporarily shored and in need of repair".

In 2008, the bridge was listed in the National Register of Historic Places (NRHP) under the name "Bridge #650 - Federal Aid Highway System Bridge". At that time, it was suggested that WPA bridges like 650 might attract tourists on the Kansas Wetlands and Wildlife Scenic Byway, a 77-mile (124 km) corridor running through Barton County and connecting Cheyenne Bottoms and Quivira National Wildlife Refuge. It was also hoped that the NRHP listing might bring in grant money to repair and maintain the bridge.

The longed-for grant money did not arrive. In 2013, the bridge was inspected and evaluated as "structurally deficient", with the substructure rated as "poor". In 2014, the Barton County Commission, noting that the bridge was inadequate for the volume of traffic that it carried, including heavy farm and oilfield equipment, and estimating that repairing the bridge would cost some $50,000 more than replacing it, voted to replace it with a reinforced concrete box. In 2016, complying with federal regulations concerning the demolition of historic structures, the Commission agreed to preserve four other NRHP-listed native-stone bridges in the county, and to provide photographic documentation of Bridge 650. Later that year, the county accepted a bid of about $130,000 to replace the bridge and to widen two existing concrete boxes nearby. By late 2017, the bridge was no more.

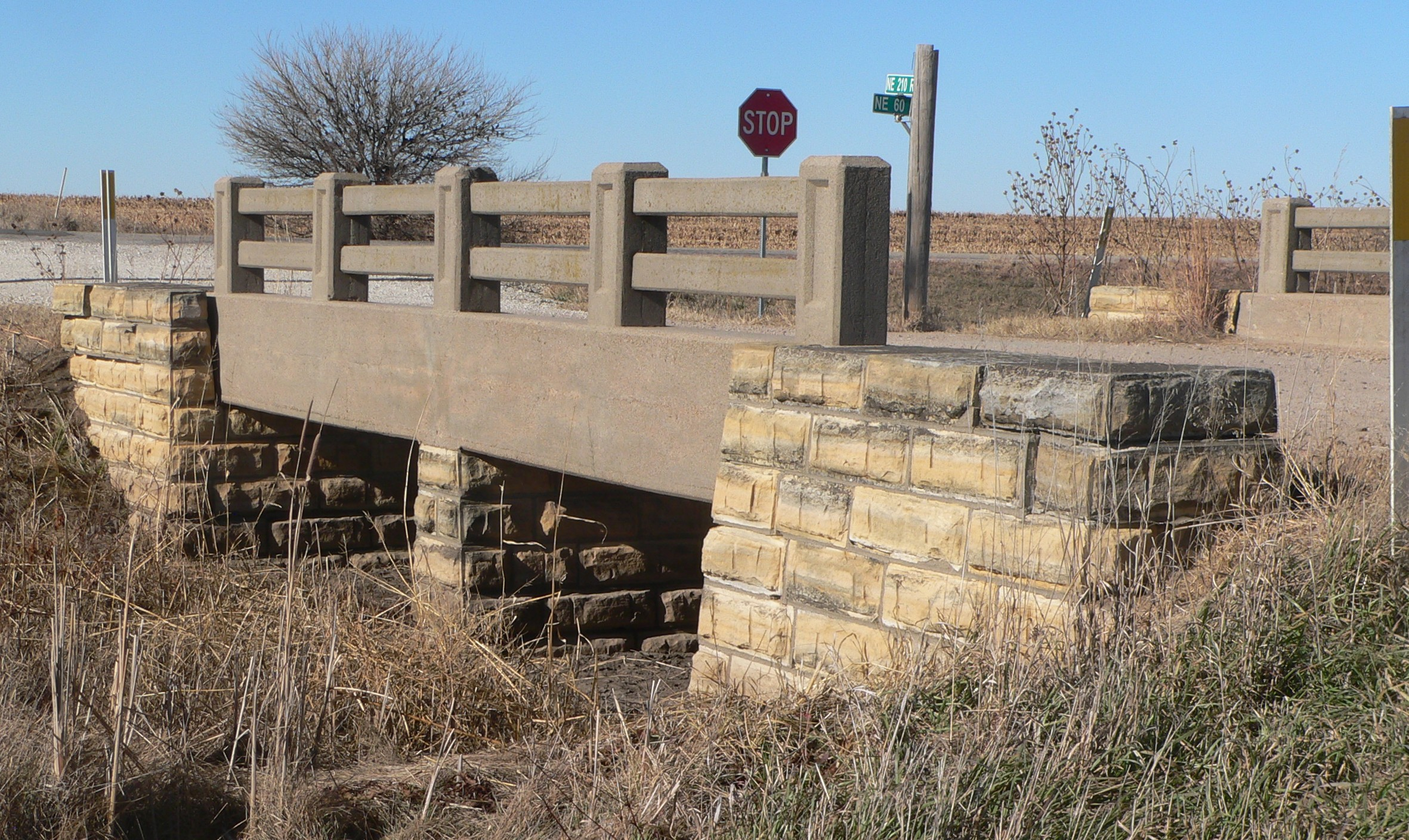
Bridge 222, similar to 650

Two of the surviving NRHP-listed WPA stone bridges, designated Bridge 222 and Bridge 640, are about a mile (about a kilometer and a half) south of the site of Bridge 650. The two bridges are described as "very similar in design and dimension" to 650.
