= Polecat Creek Bridge =

Bridge in Kansas, US

- U.S. National Register of Historic Places
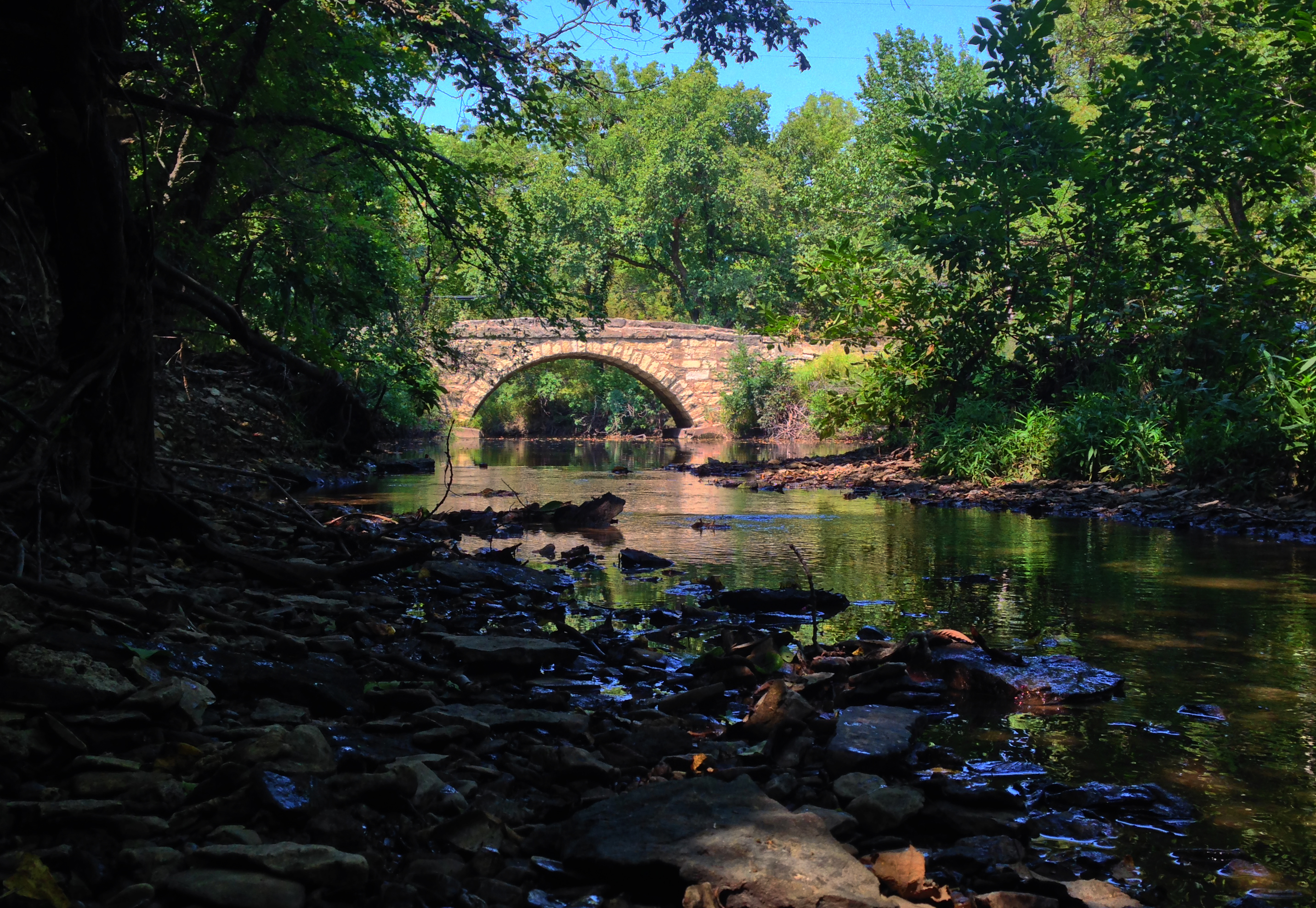
- Polecat Creek Stone Arch Bridge, Butler County, Kansas, one and one half miles east of SW Butler Rd on 230th St..

- Location within Kansas Location within the United States
- Nearest city: Douglass, Kansas
- Coordinates: 37°29′23″N 97°6′33″W
- Area: less than one acre
- Built: 1901
- Architectural style: Stone Arch
- MPS: Masonry Arch Bridges of Kansas TR
- NRHP reference No.: 85001438
- Added to NRHP: July 2, 1985

Polecat Creek Bridge is a stone arch bridge, in Kansas, United States. It is built of Kansas limestone, crossing Polecat Creek, a clear water creek, and is located in the southwest corner of Butler County, Kansas, two miles from Sedgwick County, Kansas on SW Butler Road. It was opened for traffic in 1901 and is included on the National Register of Historic Places in Butler County, Kansas.

Directions: From Wichita, Kansas head east on Highway 54/400 (Kellogg Avenue). One mile east of the Butler County line, turn south on Andover Rd. towards Rose Hill, Kansas. After 5 miles, Andover Rd. becomes SW Butler Rd.. Continue on SW Butler Rd. through Rose Hill to 230th St.. Polecat Creek Bridge is one and one half miles east on the gravel road.
