= Otter Creek Bridge (Cedar Vale, Kansas) =

- U.S. National Register of Historic Places
- Otter Creek Bridge in 2026

- Location within Kansas Location within the United States
- Nearest city: Cedar Vale, Kansas
- Coordinates: 37°9′19″N 96°29′55″W
- Area: less than one acre
- Built: 1936
- Architect: WPA
- Architectural style: Camelback through truss
- MPS: Metal Truss Bridges in Kansas 1861--1939 MPS
- NRHP reference No.: 89002189
- Added to NRHP: January 4, 1990

The Otter Creek Bridge, a 122-foot (37 m)-long 122-foot (37 m)-wide bridge in Cedar Vale, Kansas, was built in 1936. It replaced a previous bridge that was destroyed by flood in June 1935. It is a camelback through truss bridge made primarily of riveted steel and wood.

It was listed on the National Register of Historic Places in 1990, being deemed significant for its engineering.

The bridge would have been built more promptly but the Kansas Emergency Relief Committee, which developed plans for the bridge, was disbanded in 1935, and the plans were lost. The Works Project Administration, which took over responsibility for the project, had to develop new plans.
