= Nagel House =

- U.S. National Register of Historic Places
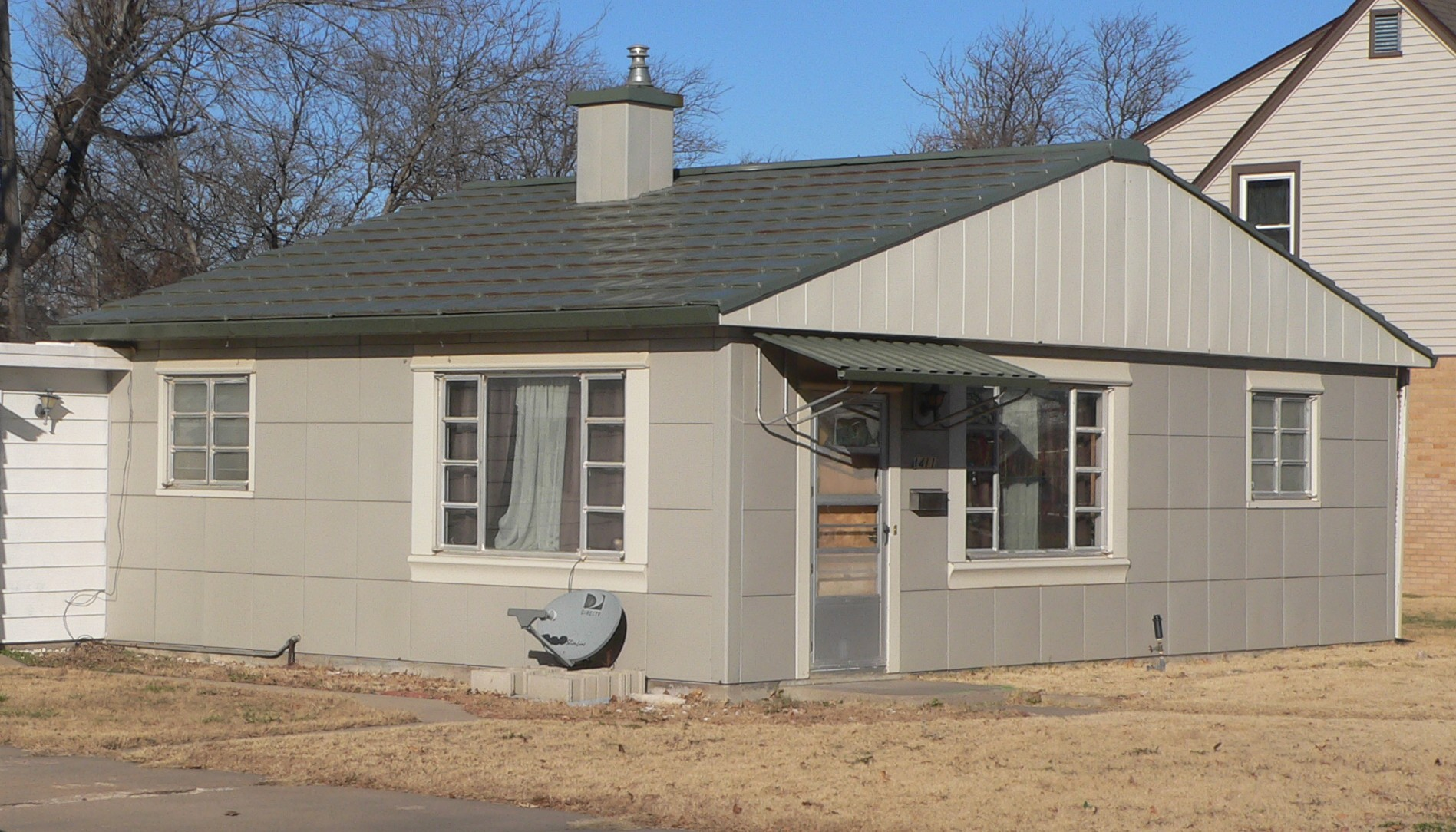

- Location within Kansas Location within the United States
- Location: 1411 Wilson St., Great Bend, Kansas
- Coordinates: 38.366035°N 98.795459°W
- Built: 1950
- Architectural style: Modern Movement, Newport Deluxe Lustron
- MPS: Lustron Houses of Kansas MPS
- NRHP reference No.: 01000181
- Added to NRHP: March 2, 2001

The Nagel House, located at 1411 Wilson St. in Great Bend, Kansas, is a Lustron house built in 1950. It was listed on the National Register of Historic Places in 2001.

It is a Newport Deluxe model of Lustron house. It is 23 by 31 feet (7.0 m × 9.4 m) in plan. It was built by Brack Implements, the Great Bend distributor for Lustron.

== See also ==
- Abel House, another NRHP-listed Lustron house in Great Bend
