= Atchison, Topeka, and Santa Fe Pratt Truss Bridge =

- U.S. National Register of Historic Places
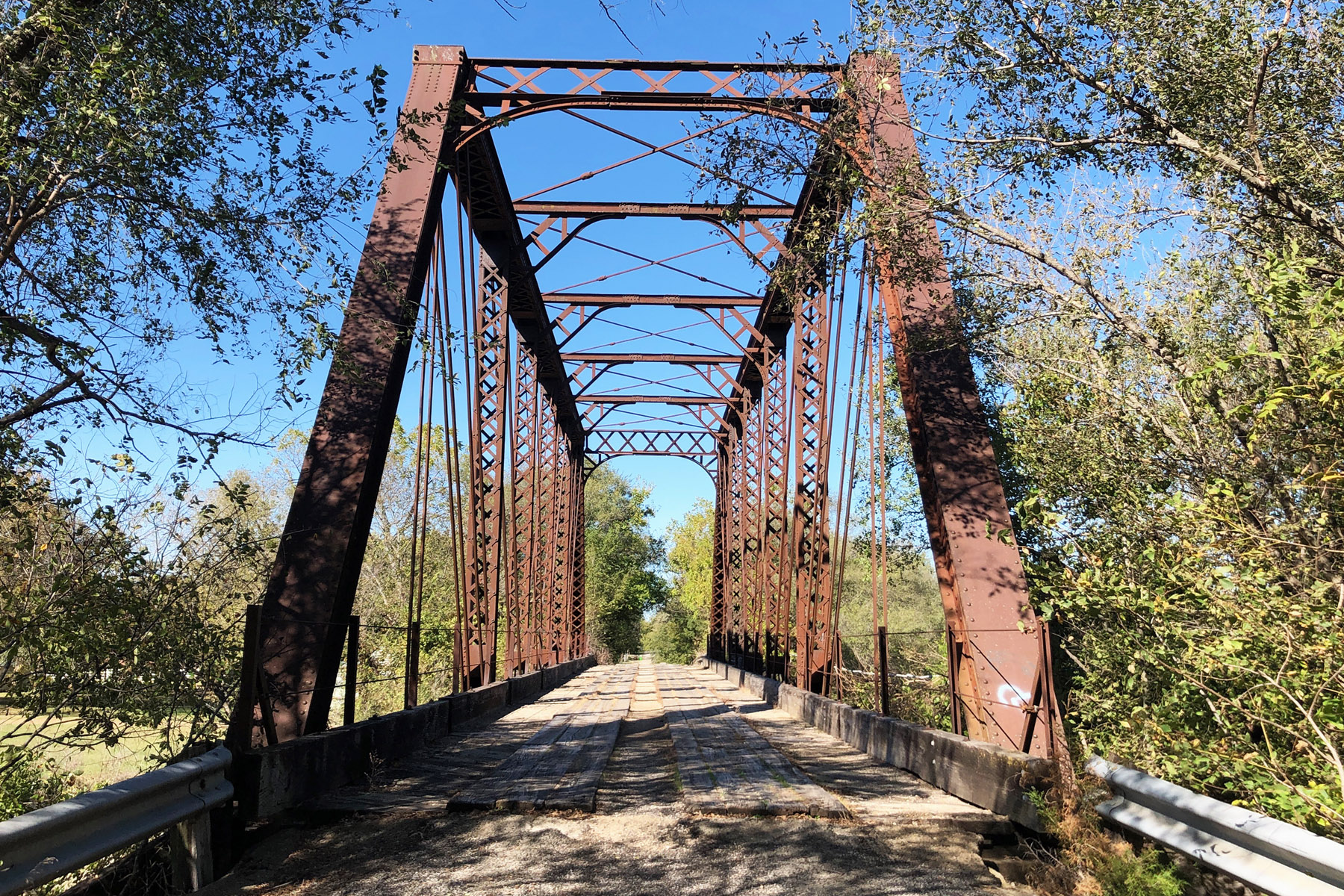
- Bridge in October 2021

- Location within Kansas
- Location: SE Pine St., 0.1 miles (0.16 km) south of intersection with E. Emporia St., Melvern, Kansas
- Coordinates: 38.50523°N 95.63553°W
- Area: less than one acre
- Built: 1909
- Built by: Atchison, Topeka & Santa Fe RR
- Architectural style: Pratt Truss
- MPS: Metal Truss Bridges in Kansas 1861-1939 MPS
- NRHP reference No.: 03000364
- Added to NRHP: May 9, 2003

The Atchison, Topeka, and Santa Fe Pratt Truss Bridge in Melvern, Kansas was built in 1909. It was listed on the National Register of Historic Places in 2003.

It is a Pratt truss bridge built by the Atchison, Topeka & Santa Fe Railroad. It is a road bridge, bringing Pine St. over railroad tracks.

It is a single-span bridge 148 feet (45 m) long and 22 feet (6.7 m) wide, with a timber deck and concrete abutments.

In its 2002 National Register nomination it was deemed significant as "an excellent example" of a Pratt truss bridge, which in the past was common in Kansas. But it also "clearly illustrates the uncommon adaptation of a standard railroad truss bridge design for vehicular traffic," and as the road had only light traffic it appeared to have high potential for preservation, as it would not likely require modification or replacement.

The bridge was in "fair" condition in 2010.

It is located on Southeast Pine St. (also known as 5th St.), 0.1 miles (0.16 km) south of its intersection with E. Emporia St. (also known as E. 309th Street) within the city of Melvern, in Osage County, Kansas.

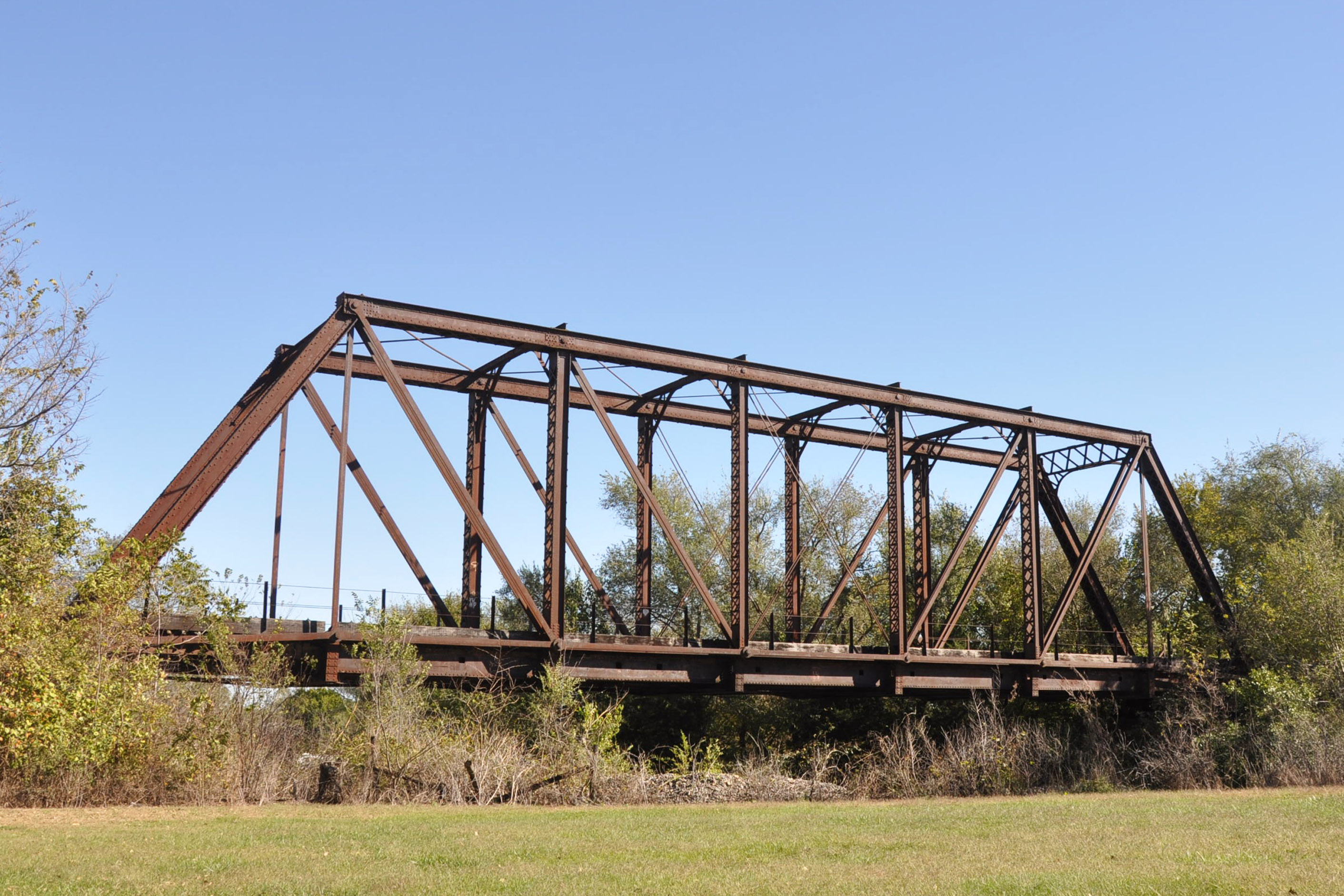
Another view in October 2021
