= Abel House =

Historic house in Kansas, United States

- U.S. National Register of Historic Places
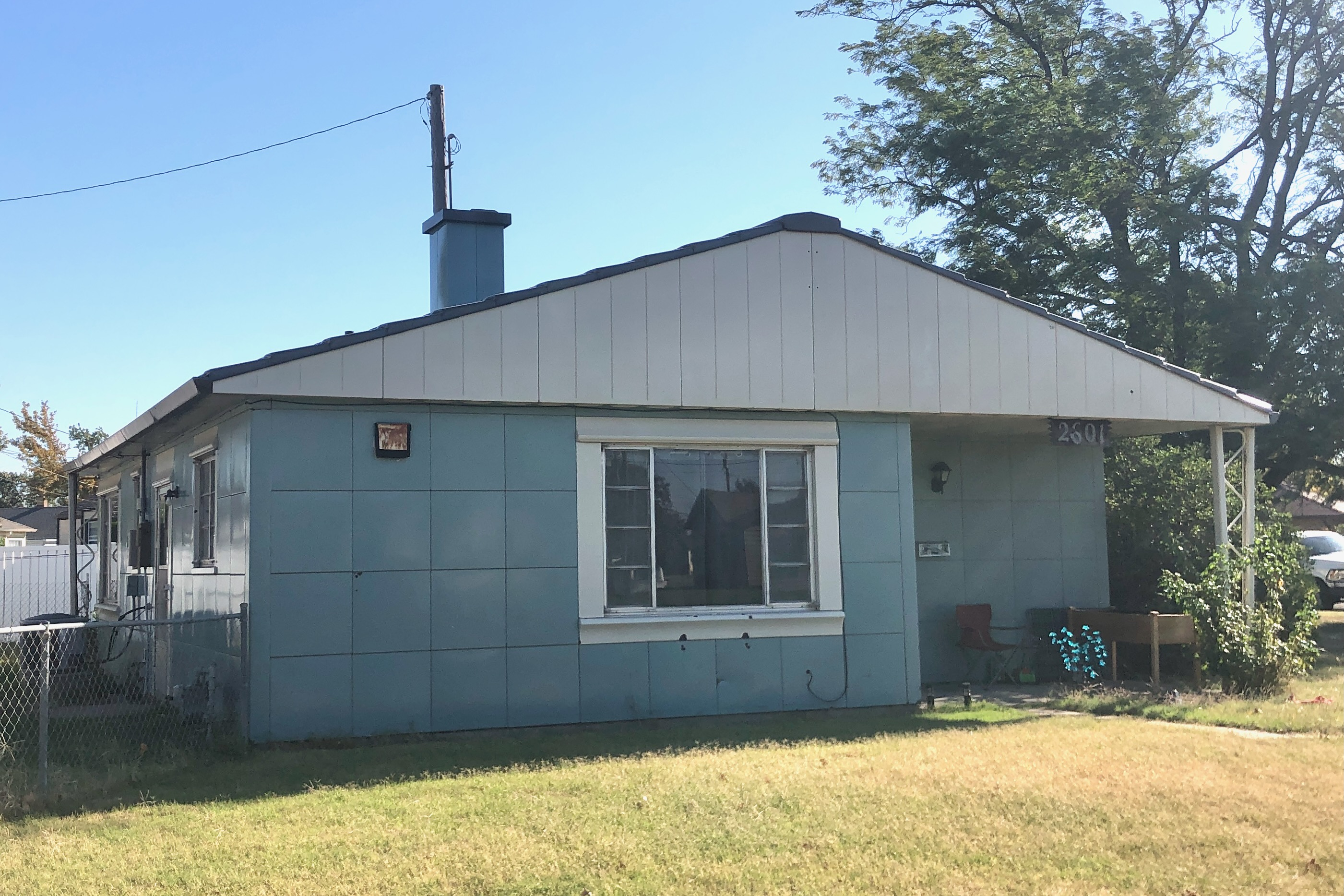
- Abel House in 2024

- Location within Kansas Location within the United States
- Location: 2601 Paseo Drive; Great Bend, Kansas
- Coordinates: 38°22′39″N 98°46′21″W
- Area: Less than 1 acre (0.40 ha)
- Built: 1949
- Built by: Brack Implements, Great Bend
- Architectural style: Modern Movement, Westchester Deluxe Lustron
- MPS: Lustron Houses of Kansas MPS
- NRHP reference No.: 01000180
- Added to NRHP: March 2, 2001

The Abel House, located at 2601 Paseo Drive in Great Bend, Kansas is a Lustron house built in 1949. It was listed on the National Register of Historic Places in 2001.

It is a "Westchester Deluxe" model. It was built and sold by Dan Brack, the Lustron dealer in Great Bend. It was bought by Walter and Betty Abel in 1949, and they lived there until 1952. It was then used as a rental until the time of the NRHP registration.

== See also ==
- Nagel House, another NRHP-listed Lustron house in Great Bend
