= Hoisington High School =

Coordinates: 38.5204°N 98.7762°W

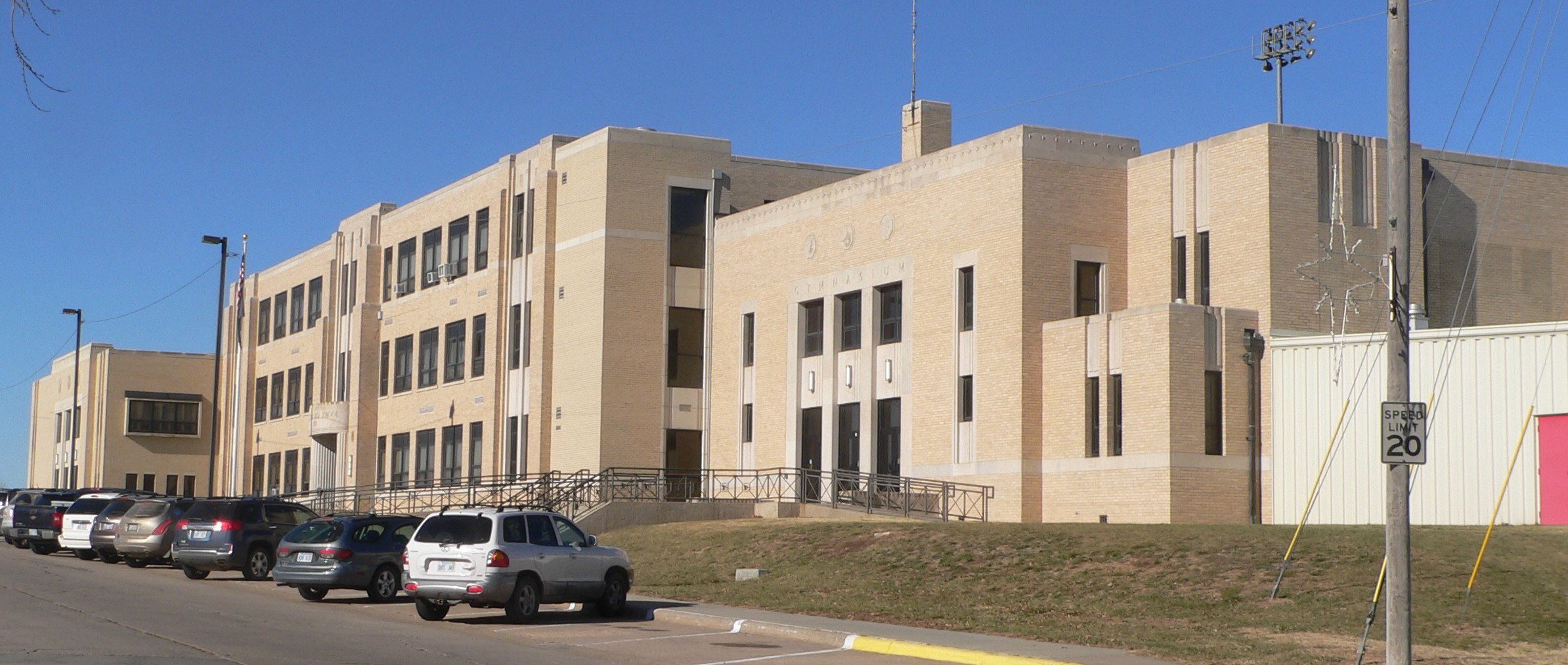

Location
- 218 E. 7th Street; Hoisington, Kansas 67544; United States

Information
- School type: Public, High School
- Established: 1938
- School board: Board Website
- School district: Hoisington USD 431
- CEEB code: 171355
- Principal: Joel Mason
- Teaching staff: 16.73 (FTE)
- Grades: 9 to 12
- Enrollment: 215 (2023–2024)
- Student to teacher ratio: 12.85
- Campus: Rural
- Colors: Red; White; Black
- Mascot: Fighting Cardinals
- Accreditation: Kansas State Department of Education
- Website: School Website

Hoisington High School is a public high school in Hoisington, Kansas, operated by Hoisington USD 431 school district. The building was designed and constructed in 1938 in the Art-Deco style by architect Henry W. Brinkman and the school is currently listed on the National Register of Historic Places.

The school offers many extracurricular activities, both athletic and non-athletic. Sports teams compete as the "Fighting Cardinals" and the school colors are red, white and black with yellow as an accent color. As of 2019, the school has won 13 state championships in various sports.

== History ==
- Hoisington High School
- U.S. National Register of Historic Places
- Location within Kansas Location within the United States
- Location: 218 E. 7th Street
- Built: 1940
- Architect: Brinkman and Hagan
- Architectural style: Art-Deco
- NRHP reference No.: 12000842
- Added to NRHP: November 15, 2005

=== Early history ===
Hoisington High School was designed by the Emporia architecture firm Brinkman & Hagan and was constructed in 1940 through the Public Works Administration. The three-story brick building features Art Deco-style stone ornamentation and carved detailing. The building also includes a 1937 native stone stadium constructed by the Works Projects Administration. The property was listed on the National Register of Historic Places in 2005.

== Extracurricular activities ==
=== Athletics ===
The athletic programs offered at Hoisington High School compete within the North Central Activities Association. The school is a member of the Kansas State High School Activities Association. The teams are known as the "Fighting Cardinals" and the school colors are red, white and black with yellow as an accent color. As of 2019, the school has won 13 state championships in various sports.

=== State championships ===
State Championships
Season	Sport	Number of Championships	Year
Fall	Cross Country, Girls	3	1984, 1986, 1987
Fall	Policy Debate	4	1930, 1968, 1994, 2006
Winter	Basketball, Boys	1	1946
Winter	Scholars Bowl	1	2001
Spring	Track & Field, Boys	4	1953, 1964, 1965, 1973
Spring	Golf, Girls	4	1982, 1983, 1984, 1985
Spring	Tennis, Girls	1	1999
Total		13	

== See also ==
- List of high schools in Kansas
- List of unified school districts in Kansas
- National Register of Historic Places listings in Barton County, Kansas
