= Beaver, Kansas =

Unincorporated community in Barton County, Kansas

- CDP
- View of Beaver, KS

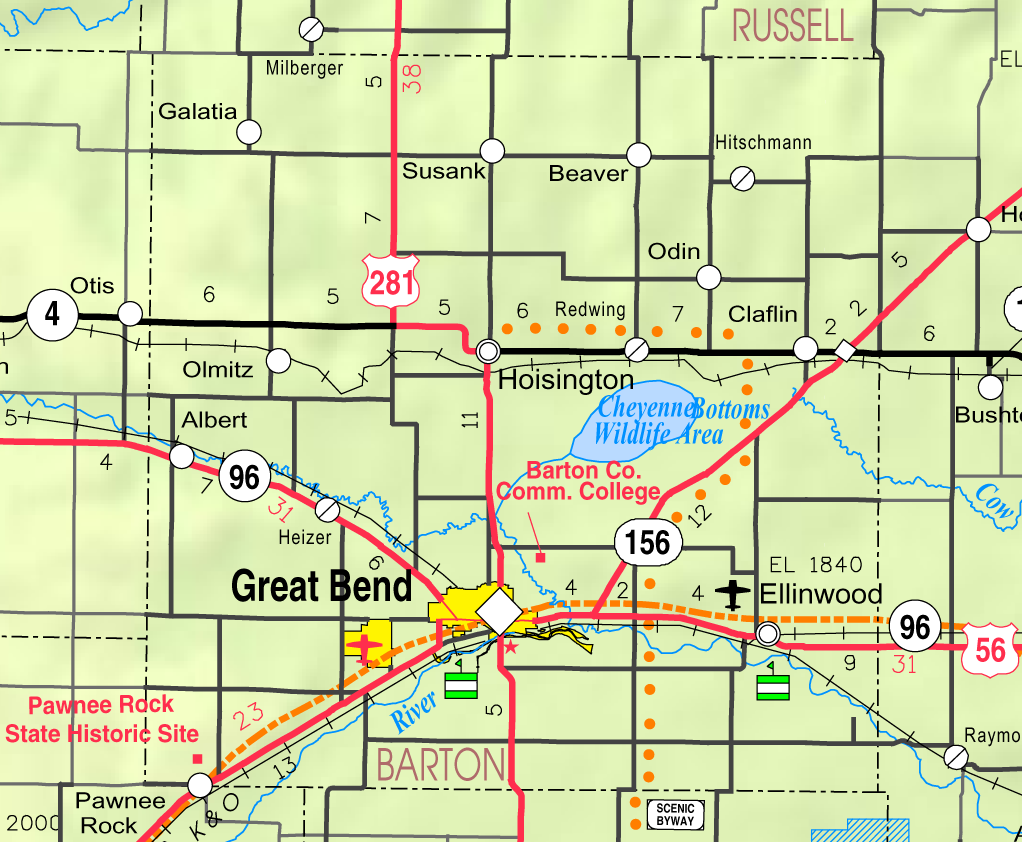
- KDOT map of Barton County (legend)

- Location within Kansas Location within the United States
- Coordinates: 38.6402889°N 98.6670217°W
- Country: United States
- State: Kansas
- County: Barton
- Elevation: 1,926 ft (587 m)

Population (2020)
  - Total: 52
- Time zone: UTC-6 (CST)
  - Summer (DST): UTC-5 (CDT)
- Area code: 620
- FIPS code: 20-04950
- GNIS ID: 475426

Beaver is a census-designated place (CDP) in Beaver Township, Barton County, Kansas, United States. As of the 2020 census, the population was 52. It is located northeast of Hoisington at the intersection of NE 190 Rd and NE 60 Ave.

== History ==
A post office was opened in Beaver in 1919, and remained in operation until it was discontinued in 1992.

== Demographics ==
Historical population
Census	Pop.	Note	%±
2020	52		—
U.S. Decennial Census

The 2020 United States census counted 52 people, 17 households, and 14 families in Beaver. The population density was 8.5 per square mile (3.3/km^{2}). There were 20 housing units at an average density of 3.3 per square mile (1.3/km^{2}). The racial makeup was 82.69% (43) white or European American (69.23% non-Hispanic white), 0.0% (0) black or African-American, 0.0% (0) Native American or Alaska Native, 0.0% (0) Asian, 0.0% (0) Pacific Islander or Native Hawaiian, 3.85% (2) from other races, and 13.46% (7) from two or more races. Hispanic or Latino of any race was 26.92% (14) of the population.

Of the 17 households, 41.2% had children under the age of 18; 70.6% were married couples living together; 5.9% had a female householder with no spouse or partner present. 5.9% of households consisted of individuals and 0.0% had someone living alone who was 65 years of age or older. The average household size was 2.0 and the average family size was 2.0. The percent of those with a bachelor's degree or higher was estimated to be 21.2% of the population.

40.4% of the population was under the age of 18, 3.8% from 18 to 24, 9.6% from 25 to 44, 25.0% from 45 to 64, and 21.2% who were 65 years of age or older. The median age was 31.5 years. For every 100 females, there were 62.5 males. For every 100 females ages 18 and older, there were 63.2 males.

== Education ==
The community is served by Central Plains USD 112 public school district.

== Transportation ==
The Atchison, Topeka and Santa Fe Railway formerly provided mixed train service to Beaver on a line between Little River and Galatia until at least 1961. As of 2025, the nearest passenger rail station is located in Hutchinson, where Amtrak's Southwest Chief stops once daily on a route from Chicago to Los Angeles.
