= Richfield, Kansas =

City in Morton County, Kansas

- City
- Location within Morton County and Kansas

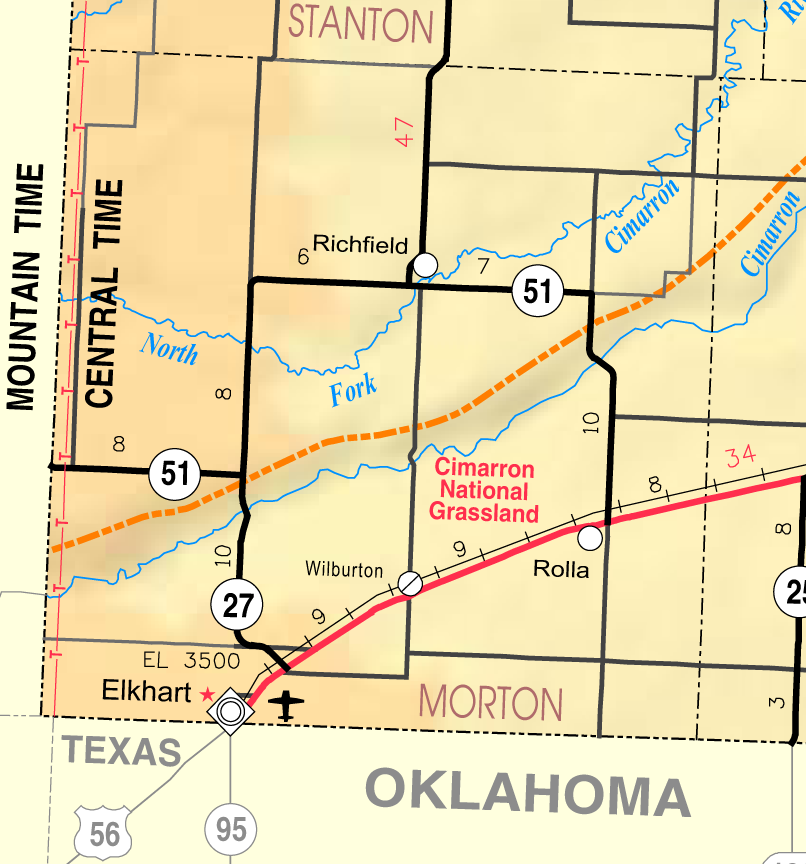
- KDOT map of Morton County (legend)
- Coordinates: 37°15′55″N 101°46′58″W
- Country: United States
- State: Kansas
- County: Morton
- Founded: 1880s
- Platted: 1885
- Incorporated: 1887
- Named for: Rich soil

Area
  - Total: 1.00 sq mi (2.60 km^{2})
  - Land: 1.00 sq mi (2.60 km^{2})
  - Water: 0 sq mi (0.00 km^{2})
- Elevation: 3,389 ft (1,033 m)

Population (2020)
  - Total: 30
  - Density: 30/sq mi (12/km^{2})
- Time zone: UTC-6 (CST)
  - Summer (DST): UTC-5 (CDT)
- ZIP Code: 67953
- Area code: 620
- FIPS code: 20-59200
- GNIS ID: 2396363

Richfield is a city in Morton County, Kansas, United States. As of the 2020 census, the population of the city was 30.

== History ==
=== 19th century ===
Richfield was platted in 1885 and was named for the fertility of the land. A town was built up quickly: in less than one year, Richfield had 600 inhabitants. In 1886, Morton County was founded and Richfield was established as the county seat.

=== 20th century ===
By 1900, the population of Richfield had declined to 61.

In the 1930s, the area was further affected by its location within the Dust Bowl. This catastrophe intensified the economic impact of the Great Depression in the region.

In 1961, the county seat was moved from Richfield to Elkhart. Richfield has subsequently been the center for basic services for residents of the surrounding rural region: school, postal, fire and police, food and fuel.

== Geography ==
According to the United States Census Bureau, the city has a total area of 1.00 square mile (2.59 km^{2}), all land.

=== Climate ===
According to the Köppen Climate Classification system, Richfield has a semi-arid climate, abbreviated "BSk" on climate maps.

Climate data for Richfield, Kansas, 1991–2020 normals, extremes 1893–present
Month	Jan	Feb	Mar	Apr	May	Jun	Jul	Aug	Sep	Oct	Nov	Dec	Year
Record high °F (°C)	83 (28)	90 (32)	102 (39)	97 (36)	105 (41)	111 (44)	112 (44)	110 (43)	106 (41)	100 (38)	91 (33)	84 (29)	112 (44)
Mean maximum °F (°C)	70.9 (21.6)	76.4 (24.7)	83.3 (28.5)	88.9 (31.6)	95.0 (35.0)	102.0 (38.9)	104.3 (40.2)	101.2 (38.4)	99.0 (37.2)	93.1 (33.9)	80.7 (27.1)	70.8 (21.6)	105.3 (40.7)
Mean daily maximum °F (°C)	48.4 (9.1)	52.6 (11.4)	60.9 (16.1)	69.9 (21.1)	79.3 (26.3)	89.7 (32.1)	94.5 (34.7)	91.3 (32.9)	84.9 (29.4)	72.7 (22.6)	59.7 (15.4)	48.9 (9.4)	71.1 (21.7)
Daily mean °F (°C)	33.7 (0.9)	37.2 (2.9)	44.5 (6.9)	53.2 (11.8)	63.7 (17.6)	74.4 (23.6)	79.2 (26.2)	76.7 (24.8)	69.1 (20.6)	56.2 (13.4)	43.9 (6.6)	34.7 (1.5)	55.5 (13.1)
Mean daily minimum °F (°C)	19.1 (−7.2)	21.7 (−5.7)	28.0 (−2.2)	36.4 (2.4)	48.1 (8.9)	59.1 (15.1)	63.9 (17.7)	62.0 (16.7)	53.3 (11.8)	39.7 (4.3)	28.1 (−2.2)	20.5 (−6.4)	40.0 (4.4)
Mean minimum °F (°C)	2.4 (−16.4)	7.1 (−13.8)	11.3 (−11.5)	22.3 (−5.4)	33.2 (0.7)	47.5 (8.6)	54.6 (12.6)	53.2 (11.8)	40.3 (4.6)	25.8 (−3.4)	11.8 (−11.2)	2.3 (−16.5)	−2.3 (−19.1)
Record low °F (°C)	−22 (−30)	−22 (−30)	−18 (−28)	8 (−13)	22 (−6)	33 (1)	46 (8)	43 (6)	25 (−4)	6 (−14)	−7 (−22)	−18 (−28)	−22 (−30)
Average precipitation inches (mm)	0.39 (9.9)	0.35 (8.9)	0.98 (25)	1.32 (34)	2.09 (53)	2.64 (67)	2.74 (70)	2.87 (73)	1.54 (39)	1.70 (43)	0.42 (11)	0.63 (16)	17.67 (449.8)
Average snowfall inches (cm)	4.8 (12)	2.8 (7.1)	3.6 (9.1)	0.9 (2.3)	0.8 (2.0)	0.0 (0.0)	0.0 (0.0)	0.0 (0.0)	0.0 (0.0)	0.6 (1.5)	1.3 (3.3)	3.6 (9.1)	18.4 (46.4)
Average precipitation days (≥ 0.01 in)	2.2	2.3	3.4	4.2	5.6	7.0	6.7	6.5	4.3	3.3	2.5	2.7	50.7
Average snowy days (≥ 0.1 in)	1.6	1.3	1.5	0.3	0.1	0.0	0.0	0.0	0.0	0.2	0.7	1.5	7.2
Source 1: NOAA
Source 2: National Weather Service

== Demographics ==
Historical population
Census	Pop.	Note	%±
1890	164		—
1900	61		−62.8%
1910	53		−13.1%
1920	62		17.0%
1930	106		71.0%
1940	96		−9.4%
1950	105		9.4%
1960	122		16.2%
1970	82		−32.8%
1980	81		−1.2%
1990	50		−38.3%
2000	48		−4.0%
2010	43		−10.4%
2020	30		−30.2%
U.S. Decennial Census

=== 2020 census ===
The 2020 United States census counted 30 people, 17 households, and 15 families in Richfield. The population density was 29.9 per square mile (11.5/km^{2}). There were 21 housing units at an average density of 20.9 per square mile (8.1/km^{2}). The racial makeup was 83.33% (25) white or European American (83.33% non-Hispanic white), 0.0% (0) black or African-American, 0.0% (0) Native American or Alaska Native, 0.0% (0) Asian, 0.0% (0) Pacific Islander or Native Hawaiian, 0.0% (0) from other races, and 16.67% (5) from two or more races. Hispanic or Latino of any race was 3.33% (1) of the population.

Of the 17 households, 29.4% had children under the age of 18; 70.6% were married couples living together; 29.4% had a female householder with no spouse or partner present. 5.9% of households consisted of individuals and 0.0% had someone living alone who was 65 years of age or older. The average household size was 3.5 and the average family size was 3.5. The percent of those with a bachelor's degree or higher was estimated to be 3.3% of the population.

23.3% of the population was under the age of 18, 0.0% from 18 to 24, 30.0% from 25 to 44, 16.7% from 45 to 64, and 30.0% who were 65 years of age or older. The median age was 43.5 years. For every 100 females, there were 114.3 males. For every 100 females ages 18 and older, there were 130.0 males.

The 2016–2020 5-year American Community Survey estimates show that the median household income was $105,000 (with a margin of error of +/- $15,368) and the median family income was $105,000 (+/- $15,368). Males had a median income of $71,250 (+/- $59,117) versus $20,625 (+/- $10,464) for females. Approximately, 0.0% of families and 0.0% of the population were below the poverty line, including 0.0% of those under the age of 18 and 0.0% of those ages 65 or over.

=== 2010 census ===
As of the census of 2010, there were 43 people, 20 households, and 15 families residing in the city. The population density was 43.0 inhabitants per square mile (16.6/km^{2}). There were 25 housing units at an average density of 25.0 per square mile (9.7/km^{2}). The racial makeup of the city was 100.0% White.

There were 20 households, of which 25.0% had children under the age of 18 living with them, 70.0% were married couples living together, 5.0% had a female householder with no husband present, and 25.0% were non-families. 25.0% of all households were made up of individuals, and 10% had someone living alone who was 65 years of age or older. The average household size was 2.15 and the average family size was 2.53.

The median age in the city was 50.5 years. 16.3% of residents were under the age of 18; 7% were between the ages of 18 and 24; 25.6% were from 25 to 44; 18.7% were from 45 to 64; and 32.6% were 65 years of age or older. The gender makeup of the city was 44.2% male and 55.8% female.
