= Hitschmann, Kansas =

Unincorporated community in Barton County, Kansas

- Unincorporated community
- Former NCRA District Office in Hitschmann

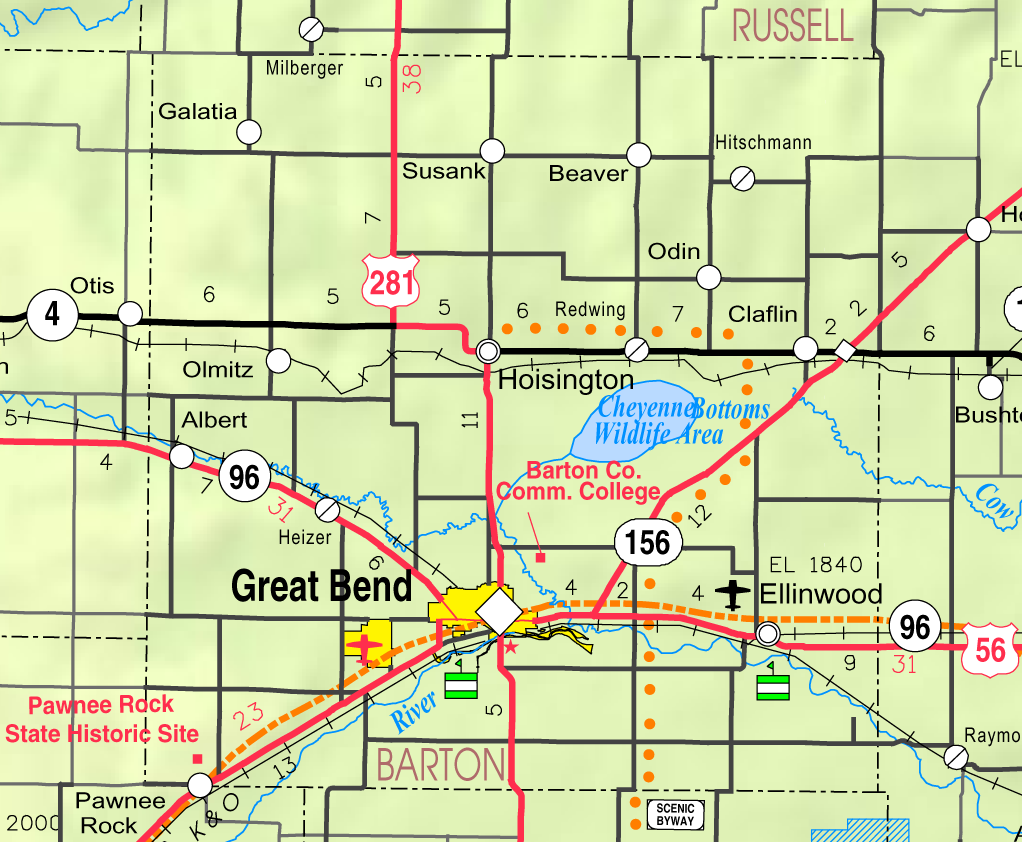
- KDOT map of Barton County (legend)

- Location within Kansas Location within the United States
- Coordinates: 38°37′27″N 98°34′53″W
- Country: United States
- State: Kansas
- County: Barton
- Founded: 1917
- Named for: J.A. Hitschmann
- Elevation: 1,926 ft (587 m)
- Time zone: UTC-6 (CST)
  - Summer (DST): UTC-5 (CDT)
- Area code: 620
- FIPS code: 20-32400
- GNIS ID: 475439

Hitschmann is an unincorporated community in Barton County, Kansas, United States. It is located northwest of Claflin on NE 180 Road between NE 100 Ave and NE 110 Ave, next to an abandoned railroad.

== Education ==
The community is served by Central Plains USD 112 public school district.

== Transportation ==
The Atchison, Topeka and Santa Fe Railway formerly provided mixed train service to Hitschmann on a line between Little River and Galatia until at least 1961. As of 2025, the nearest passenger rail station is located in Hutchinson, where Amtrak's Southwest Chief stops once daily on a route from Chicago to Los Angeles.
