= Heizer, Kansas =

Unincorporated community in Barton County, Kansas

- Unincorporated community
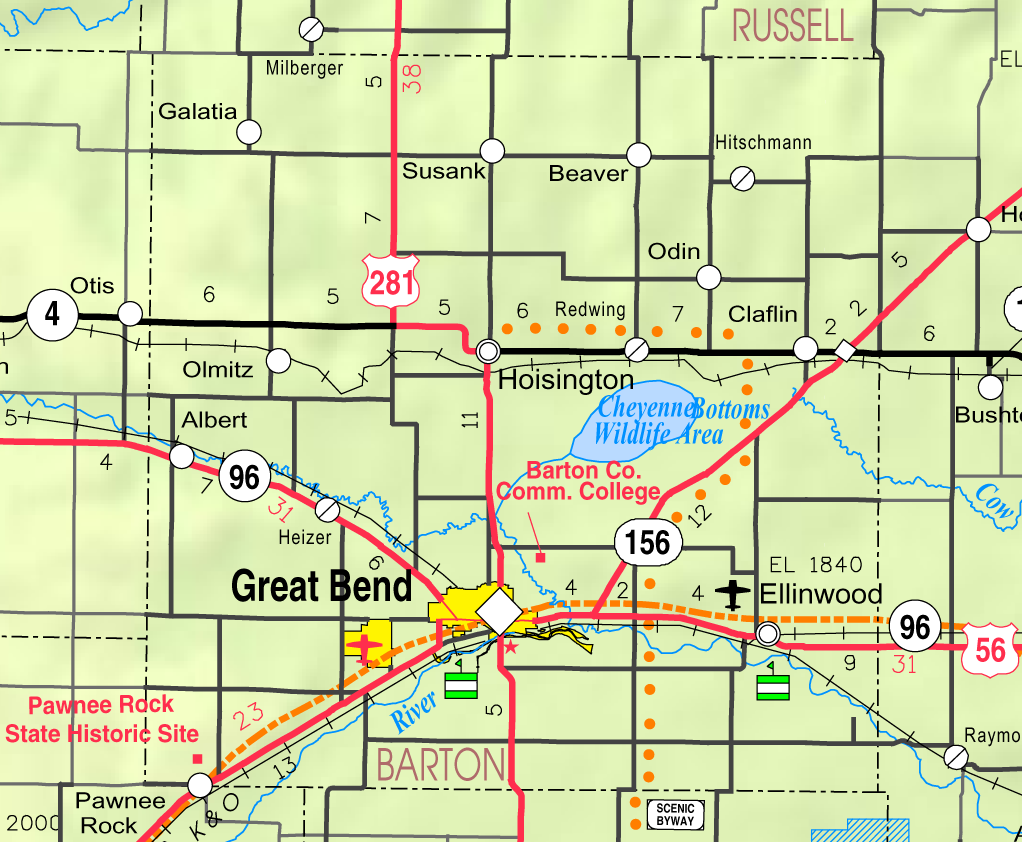
- KDOT map of Barton County (legend)

- Location within Kansas Location within the United States
- Coordinates: 38°25′20″N 98°53′21″W
- Country: United States
- State: Kansas
- County: Barton
- Elevation: 1,887 ft (575 m)
- Time zone: UTC-6 (CST)
  - Summer (DST): UTC-5 (CDT)
- Area code: 620
- FIPS code: 20-31275
- GNIS ID: 475638

Heizer, also called Heizerton, is an unincorporated community in Barton County, Kansas, United States.

== History ==
Heizer was created in the 1880s primarily out of the need for an additional railway stop northwest of the city of Great Bend, Kansas. The Atchison, Topeka and Santa Fe Railway was in the process of building lines heading out to the southwest after Colonel Cyrus K. Holliday gained charter to the company in 1859 and gained land grants through Kansas and Texas. The railroad that was built through Great Bend was one such line.

The community was named after David N, Heizer, one of the founders of Barton County and the former Mayor of Great Bend who once owned the land that Heizer was built on.

For several decades the small frontier settlement boomed with the height of the railroads in Kansas. At one point the community had over 100 residents. It was at this point that most of the businesses were established.

However, time passed and life on the Kansas plains grew more difficult, particularly with the onset of the Great Depression in the 1930s and the Dust Bowl, which hit the area particularly hard. People began to leave Kansas in the 20th century just as quickly as they had come in the 19th. Like many rural communities, Heizer suffered a severe population decrease that continues to this day. Heizer is currently estimated to have approximately 20 residents.

=== Historical businesses ===
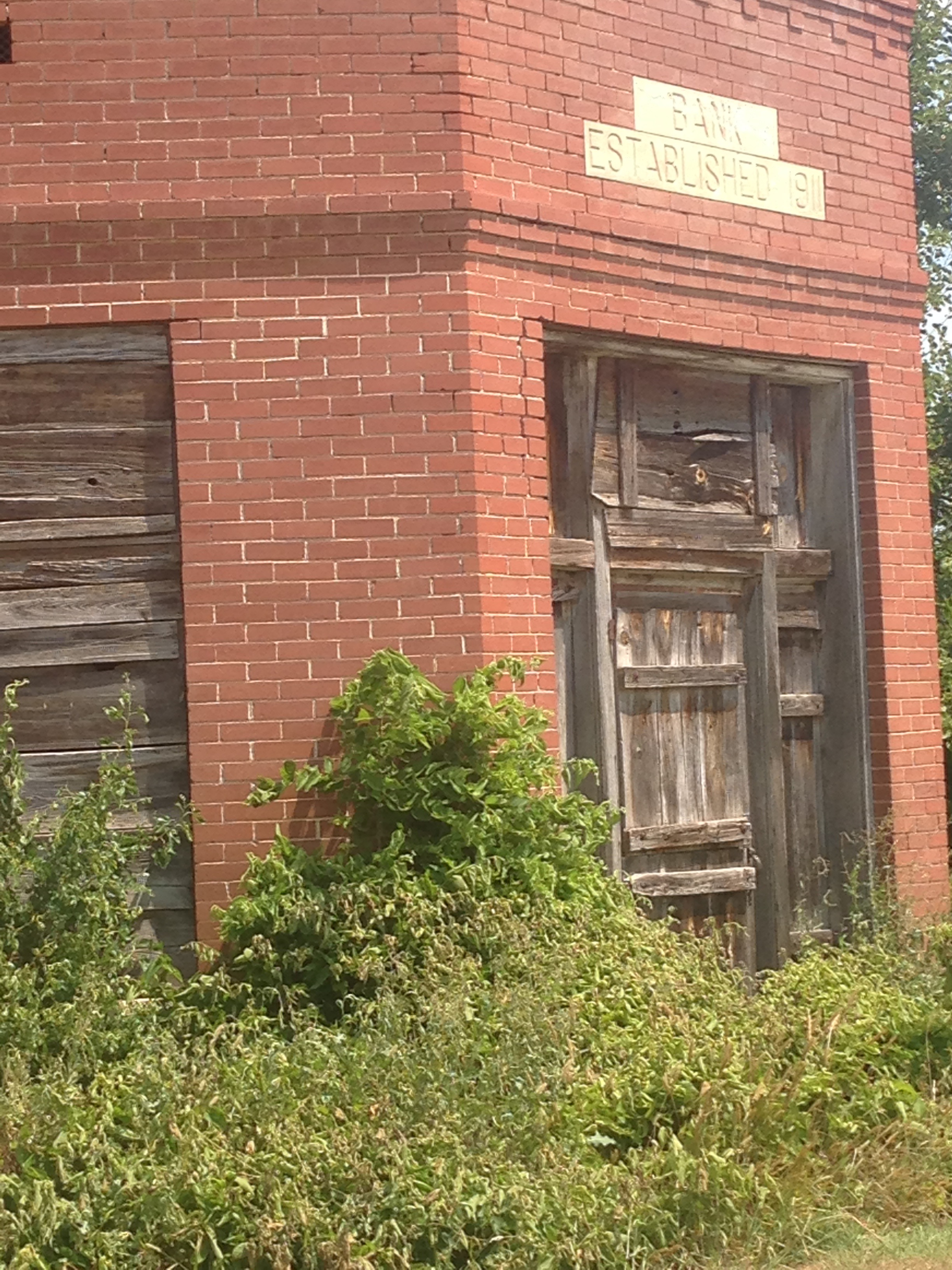
The entrance to the Heizer bank as it was in 2016

At its peak, the Heizer had numerous places of business. They included: Train Depot (seen here in its prime), blacksmith, hotel, stockyard, lumberyard, church, school, several grain elevators, general stores, hardware store, Heizer Creamery Co, bank established in 1911. Many of these businesses can be seen in the 1902 map here. None of these businesses are in operation today. Only a few of the original buildings still exist, and most are condemned.

=== Walnut Creek Bridge ===
In 1887, Barton County opened contract bids for four iron bridges within the county. The Walnut Creek Bridge, to be constructed 0.5 mi. North and 0.5 mi. West of Heizer, was given to C.R. Lane of Topeka, Kansas. Lane was the manager of Topeka's office of the Lane Bridge and Iron Works, a company which provided a variety of metalworking services throughout the Midwest. The company was given $3,700 for the contract, which is equivalent to $132,583 in 2025.

The Walnut Creek Bridge "is a pin connected Pratt through truss" which spans 115' long and 16' wide with a wood deck 21' above Walnut Creek. The bridge is unique due to the fact that it is constructed of wrought-iron, which is no longer used in bridge construction with steel being preferable. Additionally, of all Pratt through truss bridges, the Walnut Creek Bridge is the only one known to be constructed by P.E. Lane, who worked for the Lane Bridge and Iron Works company. The bridge was completed in 1887, meaning that horses and wagons were the first vehicles to use the bridge, although eventually it carried cars.

Although the bridge was officially listed in the National Register of Historic Places in 1990, marking it as a structure of historical importance, it was not enough to save the bridge from falling into disrepair. Today the bridge has been abandoned and its main wooden deck has been removed, as well as the structure as a whole being deemed structurally deficient and likely for imminent failure.

== Notable people ==
- Jacob Halman patented a new type of plow point in 1903.
- Fred Garrett along with Charles Wilkins of Hutchinson, Kansas patented a new design for disk bearings for use in cultivators in 1903.
- Frank Trauer patented his improvements in locomotive feed-water heaters for steam boilers in 1903.
