= Hoisington, Kansas =

City in Barton County, Kansas

- City
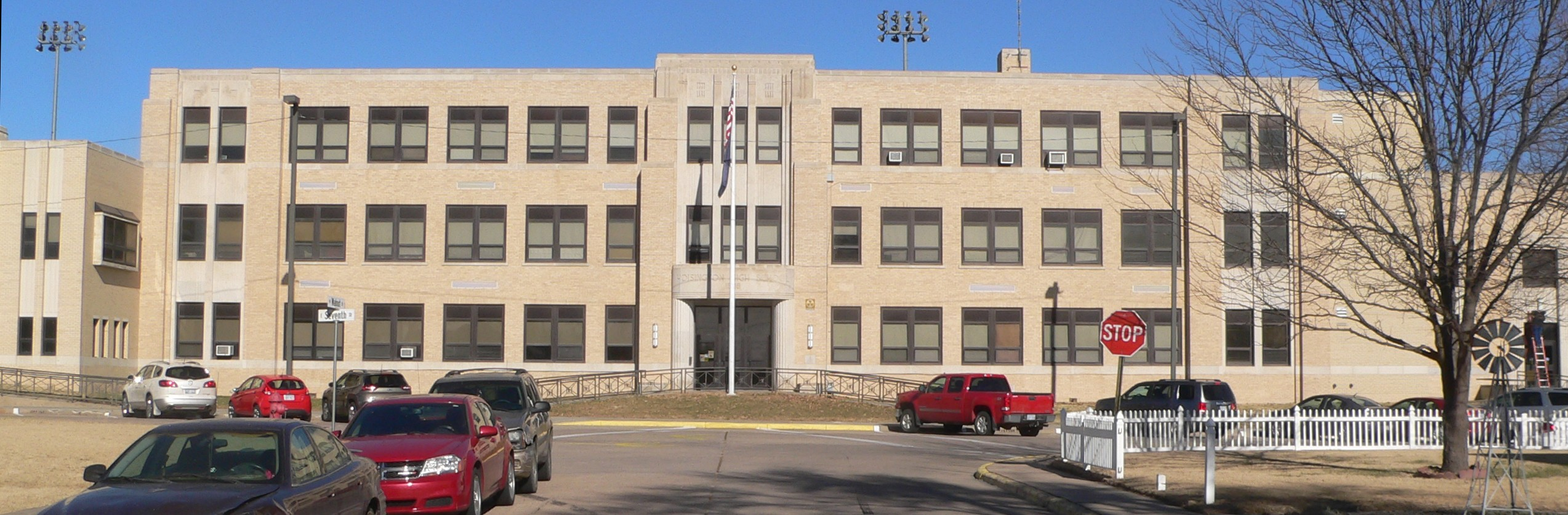
- Hoisington High School (2017)

- Location within Barton County and Kansas

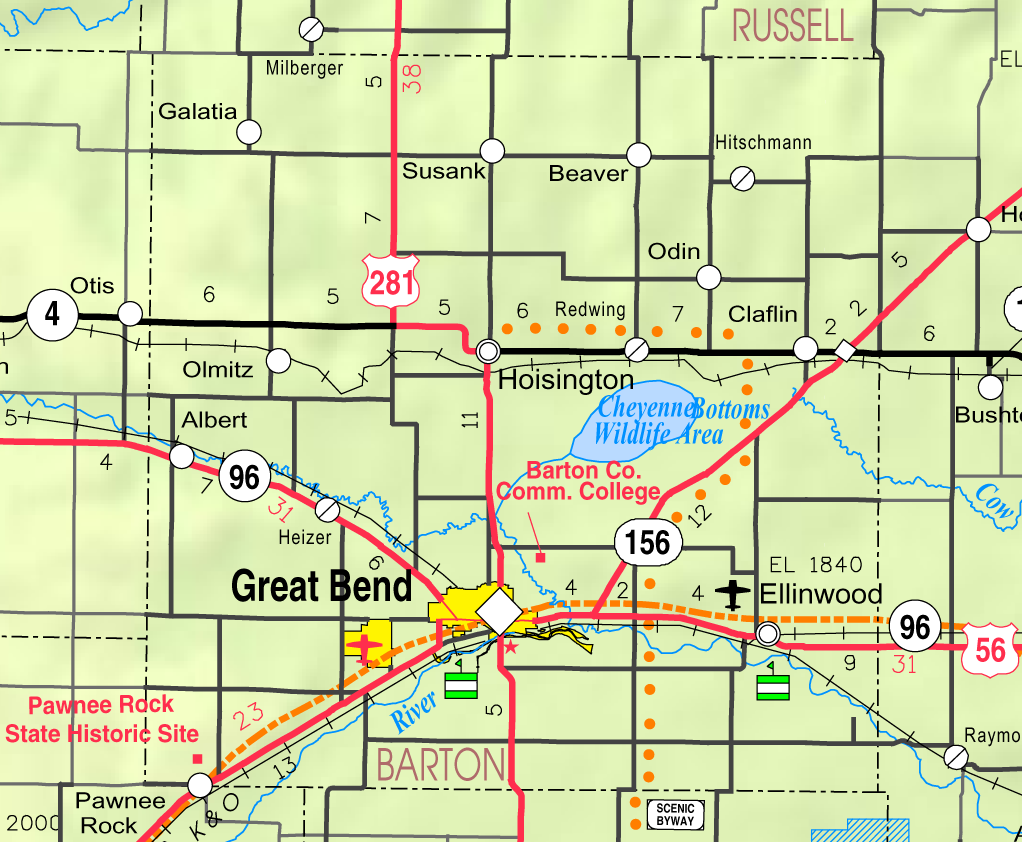
- KDOT map of Barton County (legend)
- Coordinates: 38°31′2″N 98°46′42″W
- Country: United States
- State: Kansas
- County: Barton
- Founded: 1886
- Incorporated: 1887
- Named for: Andrew Hoisington

Area
  - Total: 1.16 sq mi (3.00 km^{2})
  - Land: 1.16 sq mi (3.00 km^{2})
  - Water: 0 sq mi (0.00 km^{2})
- Elevation: 1,844 ft (562 m)

Population (2020)
  - Total: 2,699
  - Density: 2,330/sq mi (900/km^{2})
- Time zone: UTC-6 (CST)
  - Summer (DST): UTC-5 (CDT)
- ZIP Code: 67544
- Area code: 620
- FIPS code: 20-32550
- GNIS ID: 475512
- Website: hoisingtonks.org

Hoisington is a city in Barton County, Kansas, United States. As of the 2020 census, the population of the city was 2,699.

== History ==
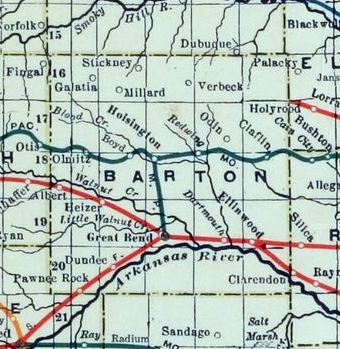
1915 railroad map of Barton County

In 1886, a group of Barton County businessmen formed the Central Kansas Town Company and founded the town of Hoisington to attract the Kansas and Colorado Railroad to the area. They named the settlement after Andrew J. Hoisington, one of the company partners and a prominent businessman in nearby Great Bend. The railroad reached Hoisington in the fall of 1886, and the settlement was incorporated as a city in 1887. The post office, relocated from nearby Buena Vista, was renamed Hoisington in April 1887 as was the railroad station, originally named Monon, by 1889.

Hoisington modernized and grew steadily over the following decades. The city's first power plant opened in 1903, and a city water system was completed in 1904. The railroad, known by that point as the Missouri Pacific, continued to play a central role in the city's development, employing 1,600 local men by 1911. Hoisington became a major freight and passenger operating division, complete with a roundhouse and shops. Electric street lights were installed in 1915, and the first streets were paved in 1917. The discovery of natural gas in the area in 1929, followed by the discovery of oil in the area in the 1930s, diversified and further stimulated the local economy.

On April 21, 2001, Hoisington suffered a large scale disaster when an F4 tornado ripped through the city, destroying 5 miles (8.0 km) with a path width of 3/8 mile (0.60 km). It came from the southwestern corner and traveled almost directly into the middle of the city. One fatality was reported, as well as 28 injuries (two critical). Two hundred homes and 12 businesses were destroyed and 85 homes were severely damaged; an additional 200 homes received minor to moderate damage. The city's population and commerce recovered quickly. Today, the tornado's path can still be seen from the air due to the lack of trees, some empty lots, and the newer houses, which are larger and more spaced out than their predecessors.

== Geography ==
Hoisington lies on the southern edge of the Smoky Hills region of the Great Plains. Blood Creek, which flows east into nearby Cheyenne Bottoms, passes immediately south of the city. Central Hoisington lies 5.5 miles (8.9 km) by road northwest of Cheyenne Bottoms. Situated at the intersection of U.S. Route 281 and K-4 in central Kansas, Hoisington is roughly 15 miles (24 km) north of Great Bend, the county seat, 105 miles (169 km) northwest of Wichita, and 234 miles (377 km) west-southwest of Kansas City. The city sits astride the line between North and South Homestead Townships.

According to the United States Census Bureau, the city has a total area of 1.15 square miles (2.98 km^{2}), all land.

== Demographics ==
Historical population
Census	Pop.	Note	%±
1890	446		—
1900	789		76.9%
1910	1,975		150.3%
1920	2,395		21.3%
1930	3,001		25.3%
1940	3,719		23.9%
1950	4,012		7.9%
1960	4,248		5.9%
1970	3,710		−12.7%
1980	3,678		−0.9%
1990	3,182		−13.5%
2000	2,975		−6.5%
2010	2,706		−9.0%
2020	2,699		−0.3%
U.S. Decennial Census

=== 2020 census ===
As of the 2020 census, Hoisington had a population of 2,699, with 1,164 households and 714 families. The population density was 2,326.7 per square mile (898.3/km^{2}). There were 1,371 housing units at an average density of 1,181.9 per square mile (456.3/km^{2}).

The median age was 39.2 years. 26.0% of residents were under the age of 18, 7.5% were from 18 to 24, 24.6% were from 25 to 44, 22.1% were from 45 to 64, and 19.8% were 65 years of age or older. For every 100 females there were 98.2 males, and for every 100 females age 18 and over there were 97.0 males age 18 and over.

There were 1,164 households in Hoisington, of which 29.9% had children under the age of 18 living in them. Of all households, 44.2% were married-couple households, 22.2% were households with a male householder and no spouse or partner present, and 27.7% were households with a female householder and no spouse or partner present. About 34.8% of all households were made up of individuals and 18.0% had someone living alone who was 65 years of age or older.

There were 1,371 housing units, of which 15.1% were vacant. The homeowner vacancy rate was 3.0% and the rental vacancy rate was 17.2%. 0.0% of residents lived in urban areas, while 100.0% lived in rural areas.

Racial composition as of the 2020 census
Race	Number	Percent
White	2,416	89.5%
Black or African American	33	1.2%
American Indian and Alaska Native	29	1.1%
Asian	8	0.3%
Native Hawaiian and Other Pacific Islander	0	0.0%
Some other race	38	1.4%
Two or more races	175	6.5%
Hispanic or Latino (of any race)	189	7.0%

=== Demographic estimates ===
The 2016–2020 5-year American Community Survey estimates show an average household size of 2.5 and an average family size of 3.0. The percent of those with a bachelor's degree or higher was estimated to be 16.7% of the population.

=== Income and poverty ===
The 2016–2020 5-year American Community Survey estimates show that the median household income was $47,566 (with a margin of error of +/- $8,203) and the median family income was $58,828 (+/- $13,969). Males had a median income of $36,359 (+/- $3,979) versus $22,090 (+/- $3,558) for females. The median income for those above 16 years old was $29,773 (+/- $5,996). Approximately, 15.2% of families and 12.6% of the population were below the poverty line, including 11.6% of those under the age of 18 and 11.9% of those ages 65 or over.

=== 2010 census ===
As of the 2010 census, there were 2,706 people, 1,167 households, and 721 families in the city. The population density was 2,255 inhabitants per square mile (871/km^{2}). There were 1,361 housing units at an average density of 1,134.2 per square mile (437.9/km^{2}). The racial makeup of the city was 94.9% White, 1.1% African American, 0.4% American Indian, 1.1% from some other race, and 2.4% from two or more races. 4.1% of the population was Hispanic or Latino of any race.

There were 1,167 households, of which 29.9% had children under the age of 18, 48.5% were married couples living together, 4.2% had a male householder with no wife present, 9.1% had a female householder with no husband present, and 38.2% were non-families. 34.5% of all households were made up of individuals, and 18.0% had someone living alone who was 65 years of age or older. The average household size was 2.32, and the average family size was 2.98.

In the city, the population was spread out, with 26.0% under the age of 18, 6.7% from 18 to 24, 23.3% from 25 to 44, 26.5% from 45 to 64, and 17.5% who were 65 years of age or older. The median age was 39.3 years. For every 100 females, there were 92.2 males. For every 100 females age 18 and over, there were 87.9 males age 18 and over.

== Education ==
The community is served by Hoisington USD 431 public school district with four schools in Hoisington:

- Hoisington High School (9–12)
- Hoisington Middle School (6–8)
- Lincoln Elementary School (2–5)
- Roosevelt Elementary School (PreK–1)

== Transportation ==
U.S. Route 281 runs north–south through Hoisington, intersecting and briefly running concurrently with K-4 which runs east–west through the city.

The Hoisington Subdivision of the Kansas and Oklahoma Railroad runs east–west around the southern side of the city. This was previously a part of the Missouri Pacific Railroad. A 1908 wooden depot was demolished in 1964 and replaced by a $25,000 brick depot with heating and air conditioning.

== Media ==
Hoisington has two weekly newspapers: The Hoisington Dispatch and Tri-County News.

Radio station KHOK is licensed to Hoisington and broadcasts from Great Bend, Kansas on 100.7 FM, playing a country format.

Fox affiliate KOCW, a satellite of KSAS-TV in Wichita, is licensed to Hoisington and broadcasts on digital channel 14.

== Culture ==
The April 2001 storm was featured on an episode of The Weather Channel series Storm Stories. The tornado struck during the high school prom, and many of the prom goers were unaware the tornado had even hit—a fact that was the subject of the June 9, 2001, episode of the NPR radio show This American Life.

The ABC comedy Sports Night referenced Hoisington on October 13, 1998, in the episode "Intellectual Property." Associate Producer Jeremy Goodwin, challenged to find material to enable sports anchors Dan Rydell and Casey McCall to stretch a segment about a sporting event, notes that the "attendance at tonight's game, 11,323, is exactly the same as the population of Hoisington, Kansas." Producer Dana Whitaker then relays to Dan and Casey that they have two options for stretching the segment: report this odd "fact" about Hoisington, or "talk slower." Hoisington's population in 1998 was probably much closer to 2,975, according to the 2000 census.

== Notable people ==
Notable individuals who were born in and/or have lived in Hoisington include:

- Walter Broadnax (1944–), public administration professor
- Doug Dumler (1950–), football offensive lineman
- Kathryn Eames (1908–2004), actress
- Roy Ehrlich (1928–1997), Kansas state legislator
- Kari Wahlgren (1977–), voice actress
