= Fox Theatre =

Fox Theatre or Fox Theater or Fox Theater Building may refer to:

== U.S. ==
=== California ===
- Fox Theater (Bakersfield, California)
- Fox Theatre (Fullerton, California)
- Fox Theater (Hollywood, California)
- Fox Theater, Westwood Village (Los Angeles)
- Fox Oakland Theatre (Oakland)
- Fox Theater Pomona (Pomona)
- Fox Theatre (Redwood City, California)
- Riverside Fox Theater (Riverside)
- Fox California Theatre, now called the California Theatre (San Jose)
- Fox Theatre (Visalia, California)
- Fox Theatre, the original name of Jacobs Music Center (San Diego)
- Fox Theatre (San Francisco)

=== Elsewhere ===
- Fox Tucson Theatre (Tucson, Arizona)
- Fox Theatre (Boulder, Colorado)
- Fox Theater at Foxwoods Resort Casino (Ledyard, Connecticut)
- Fox Theatre (Atlanta), Georgia
- Blue Fox Theatre (Grangeville, Idaho)
- Fox Theater (Hutchinson, Kansas)
- Fox–Watson Theater Building (Salina, Kansas)
- Fox Theatre (Detroit), Michigan
- Fox Theater (Joplin, Missouri)
- Fox Theatre (Springfield), Missouri
- Fox Theatre (St. Louis), Missouri
- Fox Theatre (Las Cruces, New Mexico)
- Fox Theatre (Brooklyn), New York
- Fox Theatre (Portland, Oregon)
- Fox Theater (Spokane, Washington)
- Fox Theatre, the original name of Meyer Theatre (Green Bay, Wisconsin)
- Fox Theater (Stevens Point, Wisconsin)

== Canada ==
- Fox Theatre (Toronto)

== See also ==
- Fox Theatres, a defunct chain of movie theaters
