= Trinity Baptist Church (Vacaville, California) =

Baptist church in California

Coordinates: 38°21′31″N 122°0′8″W

Trinity Baptist Church is a Baptist Christian church in Vacaville, California. It is notable for its annual Christmastime Live Nativity event featuring singers, actors, and live animals. In 2016, Trinity Baptist Church expanded its facilities with a new foyer.

Everett Nourse, who was inducted into the American Theater Organ Society Hall of Fame in 1998, was the longtime organist at Trinity Baptist Church.

Trinity Baptist Church's current Senior Pastor is Greg Davidson,
