= Boller Brothers =

American architectural firm

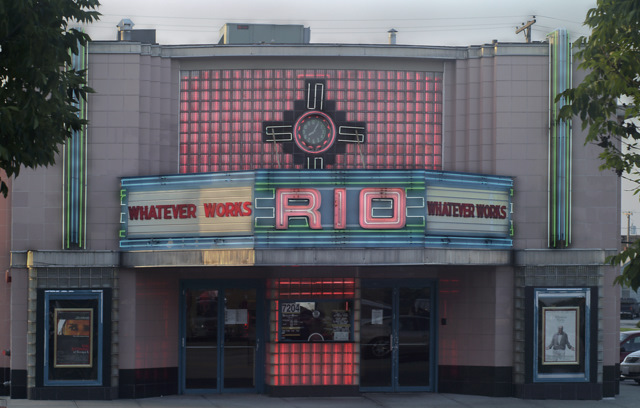
The Rio Theatre in Overland Park, Kansas

Boller Brothers, often written Boller Bros., was an architectural firm based in Kansas City, Missouri which specialized in theater design in the Midwestern United States during the first half of the 20th century. Carl Heinrich Boller (1868–1946) and Robert Otto Boller (1887–1962) are credited with the design of almost 100 classic theaters ranging from small vaudeville venues to grand movie palaces.

About 20 Boller Brothers works are listed on the National Register of Historic Places.

== Arkansas ==
- Baxter Theater Mountain Home, Arkansas Closed
- New Theatre, 9 N. 10th St. Fort Smith, Arkansas, NRHP-listed Closed
- Rialto Theatre Searcy, Arkansas Open

== California ==
- Corona Theatre Corona, California Closed
- Fontana Theatre Fontana, California Renovating
- Inglewood Theater Inglewood, California Demolished
- Largo Theatre Los Angeles, California Demolished
- Montrose Theatre Montrose, California Demolished
- Stadium Theater Los Angeles, California Renovated; B'nai David-Judea Congregation
- Tracy Theatre Long Beach, California Demolished
- West Coast Theatre Santa Ana, California Closed
- Walkers Orange County Theater, 308 N. Main St. Santa Ana, CA (Boller, Carl), NRHP-listed
- White Theatre Fresno, California Demolished
- Yost Theatre Santa Ana, California Closed

== Colorado ==
- Boulder Theater Boulder, Colorado Open
- Chief Theatre Pueblo, Colorado Closed

== Illinois ==
- Granada Theater Mt. Vernon, Illinois Renovating
- Illinois Theatre Jacksonville, Illinois Open
- Majestic Theatre (East St. Louis, Illinois), 240-246 Collinsville Ave. East St. Louis, IL (Boller Bros.), NRHP-listed Closed
- Will Rogers Theater Collinsville, Illinois Closed

== Kansas ==
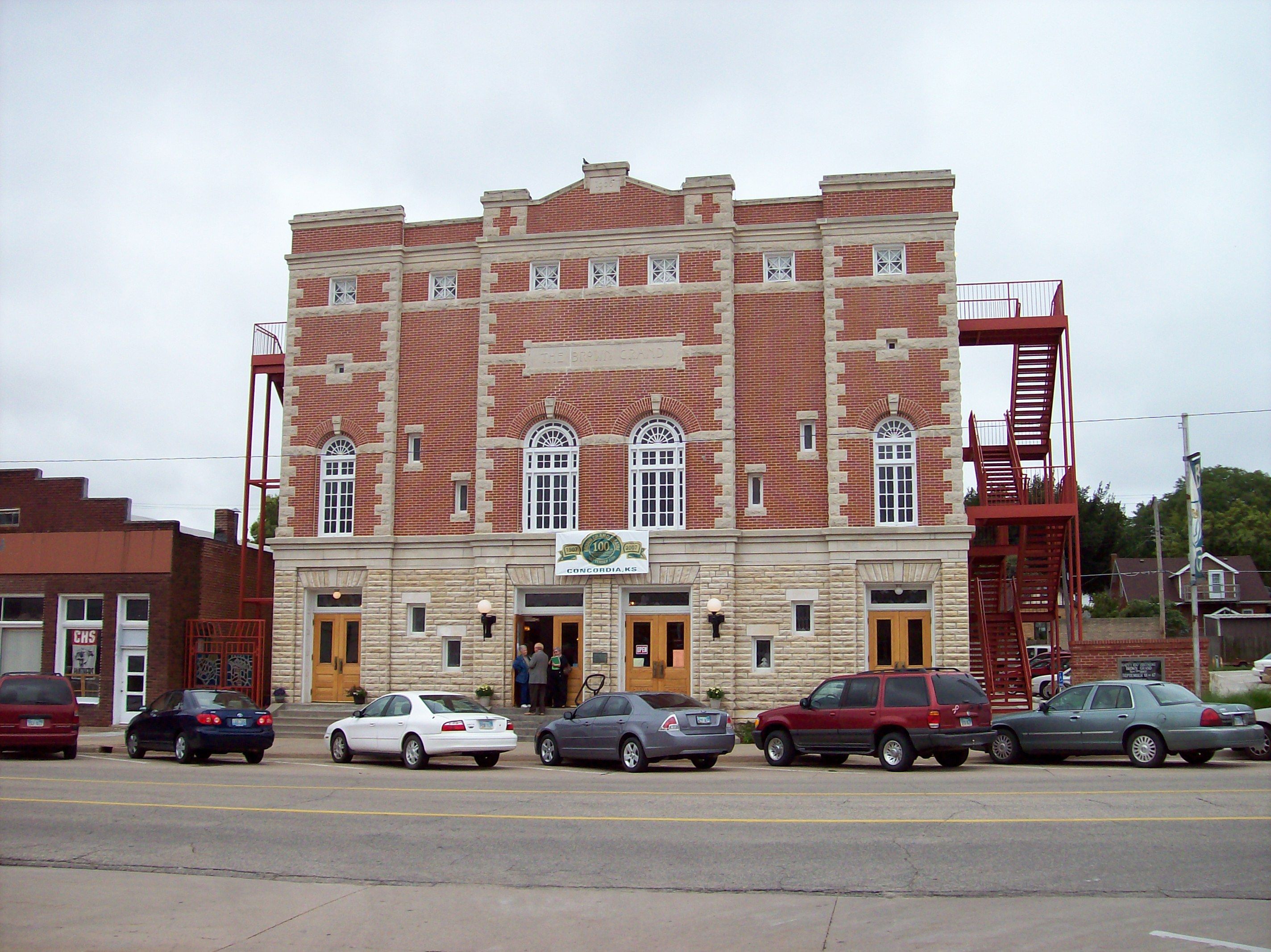
The Brown Grand Theatre in Concordia, Kansas, 2007

- Arcada Theater Holton, Kansas Closed
- Brown Grand Theatre Concordia, Kansas Open
- Burford Theatre Arkansas City, Kansas Renovating
- Booth Theater, 119 W. Myrtle St. Independence, Kansas (Boller Brothers), NRHP-listed Renovating / Open
- Chanute Cinema I & II Chanute, Kansas Open
- Crawford Theatre Wichita, Kansas Demolished
- Crest Theater, 1905 Lakin Ave. Great Bend, KS (Boller and Lusk), NRHP-listed
- Crest Theater Wichita, Kansas Demolished
- Crown Uptown Theatre Wichita, Kansas Open
- Crystal Plaza Theatre Ottawa, Kansas Open
- Dream Theater, 629 N. Main St. Russell, KS (Boller, Robert O.), NRHP-listed
- Electric Theatre Kansas City, Kansas Demolished
- Fine Arts Shawnee, Kansas Renovating
- Fox Plaza Liberal, Kansas Closed
- Fox-Watson Theater Building, 155 S. Santa Fe Ave. Salina, KS (Boller Brothers), NRHP-listed Open
- Hutchinson's Historic FOX Theatre, 18 E. First Ave. Hutchinson, Kansas (Boller Brothers), NRHP-listed Open
- Emporia Granada Theatre, 809 Commercial Emporia, KS (Boller Brothers), NRHP-listed, Granada Theatre Emporia, Kansas Open Website: Emporia Granada Theatre
- Granada Theater, 1013-1019 Minnesota Ave. Kansas City, KS (Boller Brothers), NRHP-listed Open
- Granada Theatre Lawrence, Kansas Open
- Jayhawk Theatre | The State Theatre of Kansas Topeka, Kansas official Jayhawk website Closed - to be restored
- Jayhawk Theater Kansas City, Kansas Demolished
- Hollywood Theater (Leavenworth, Kansas), 401 Delaware St. Leavenworth, KS (Boller Bros. and Boller, Robert), NRHP-listed
- Majestic Theatre Phillipsburg, Kansas Open
- Nomar Theatre Wichita, Kansas Closed
- Norton Theatre Norton, Kansas Open
- Overland Theater/Rio Theatre, 7204 W. 80th St. Overland Park, Kansas (Boller, Robert), NRHP-listed
- State Theatre Larned, Kansas Open
- Stiefel Theatre for the Performing Arts Salina, Kansas Open
- Sunflower Theater Peabody, Kansas Closed
- Uptown Theatre Iola, Kansas Status Unknown
- Varsity Theater Lawrence, Kansas Closed
- Wareham Theatre Manhattan, Kansas Open

== Missouri ==
- Aladdin Theatre Kansas City, Missouri Closed
- Apollo Theatre Kansas City, Missouri Closed
- Ashland Theatre Kansas City, Missouri Closed
- Bagdad Theatre Kansas City, Missouri Closed
- Ben Bolt Theatre Chillicothe, Missouri Demolished
- Benton Theatre Kansas City, Missouri Closed
- Broadway Theatre Cape Girardeau, Missouri Closed
- Calvin Opera House Washington, Missouri Open
- Capitol Theatre Jefferson City, Missouri Closed
- Davis Theatre West Plains, Missouri Closed
- Electric Theatre St. Joseph, Missouri Demolished
- Empress Theatre Kansas City, Missouri Demolished
- Esquire Theatre Bolivar, Missouri Closed
- Garden Theater Kansas City, Missouri Demolished
- Gillham Theatre Kansas City, Missouri Closed
- Hall Theatre Columbia, Missouri Closed, building NRHP-listed as contributing building in North Ninth Street Historic District, 5-36 North Ninth St. Columbia, MO (Boller Brothers)
- Halloran Theatre Moberly, Missouri Closed
- Kimo Theatre Kansas City, Missouri Demolished
- Landers Theater, 311 E. Walnut Springfield, Missouri (Boller, Carl) Open
- Lincoln Theatre Kansas City, Missouri Closed
- Mercier Theatre Perryville, Missouri Closed
- Midland Theatre Kansas City, Missouri Open
- Missouri Theatre Columbia, Missouri Open, NRHP-listed as Missouri Theater, 201-215 S. 9th St. Columbia, MO (Boller Brothers)
- Missouri Theater, St. Joseph, Missouri Open
- Norside Theatre St. Louis, Missouri Demolished
- Orpheum Theater Hannibal, Missouri Renovating
- Owen's Theatre Branson, Missouri Open
- Paramount Theatre Rock Port, Missouri closed
- Plaza Theater Kansas City, Missouri Closed
- Plaza Theater Lamar, Missouri Open
- Regal Theater St. Joseph, Missouri Closed
- Regent Theatre Kansas City, Missouri Closed
- Rockhill Theatre Kansas City, Missouri Demolished
- Sun Theatre Kansas City, Missouri Closed
- Uptown Theater Sedalia, Missouri Closed
- Uptown Theatre Rolla, Missouri Demolished March 2010
- Warwick Theatre Kansas City, Missouri Closed

== Mississippi ==
- Elkin Theatre Aberdeen, Mississippi Open

== Nebraska ==
- Lincoln Theatre Lincoln, Nebraska Demolished in 1962

== New Mexico ==
- El Morro Theater, 205–209 W. Coal Ave. Gallup, NM (Boller, Carl), NRHP-listed Open
- KiMo Theater, 421 Central Ave. Albuquerque, New Mexico (Boller Bros.), NRHP-listed Open
- Lensic Theater, Santa Fe, New Mexico, NHRP-listed Open
- Lyceum Theater, 409 Main St. Clovis, NM (Boller Bros.), NRHP-listed Open

== Oklahoma ==
- Bays Theater (800 seats), Main & Bridge, Blackwell, Oklahoma Closed
- Centre Theatre 1947–present (1700 seats), 415 Couch Drive, Oklahoma City, Oklahoma Closed
- Cine 2 Theater 1926-2006 (1000 seats), 225 Main Street, Henryetta, Oklahoma Demolished
- Coleman Theatre 1929–present (1600 seats), First & Main, Miami, OK (Boller Brothers), NRHP-listed Open
- Criterion Theater 1921-1973 (1900 seats), 108 West Main Street, Oklahoma City, Oklahoma Demolished
- Liberty Theater 1915-1976 (1500 seats), 19 North Robinson Avenue, Oklahoma City, Oklahoma Demolished
- Morgan Theater 1914-2008 (1200 seats), 316 Main Street, Henryetta, Oklahoma Demolished
- Oklahoman Theater (1000 seats), 315 South Main Street, Hobart, Oklahoma closed
- Plaza Theater 1935–present (900 seats), 1725 Northwest Sixteenth Street, Oklahoma City, Oklahoma Closed
- Poncan Theatre 1927–present (800 seats), 104 East Grand Avenue. Ponca City, Oklahoma (Boller Brothers), NRHP-listed Open
- Rialto Theater 1910-1972 (1200 seats), 13-17 Third Street, Tulsa, Oklahoma Demolished
- Ritz Theater 1928-1963 (900 seats), 1012 Northeast Thirteenth Street, Oklahoma City, Oklahoma Demolished

== Pennsylvania ==
- Latonia Theatre 1929–present (1600 seats), 1 East First Street, Oil City, Pennsylvania under renovation

== Texas ==
- Granada Theatre Plainview, Texas Closed
- Texas Theatre San Antonio, Texas Demolished
- Wichita Theatre 1908-present (1100 seats original, 800 current) 919 Indiana Wichita Falls, Texas Open

== Wyoming ==
- Kirby Theatre Worland, Wyoming Status Unknown
- New Aileen Theatre Worland, Wyoming Status Unknown
