= Emporia Granada Theatre =

- U.S. National Register of Historic Places
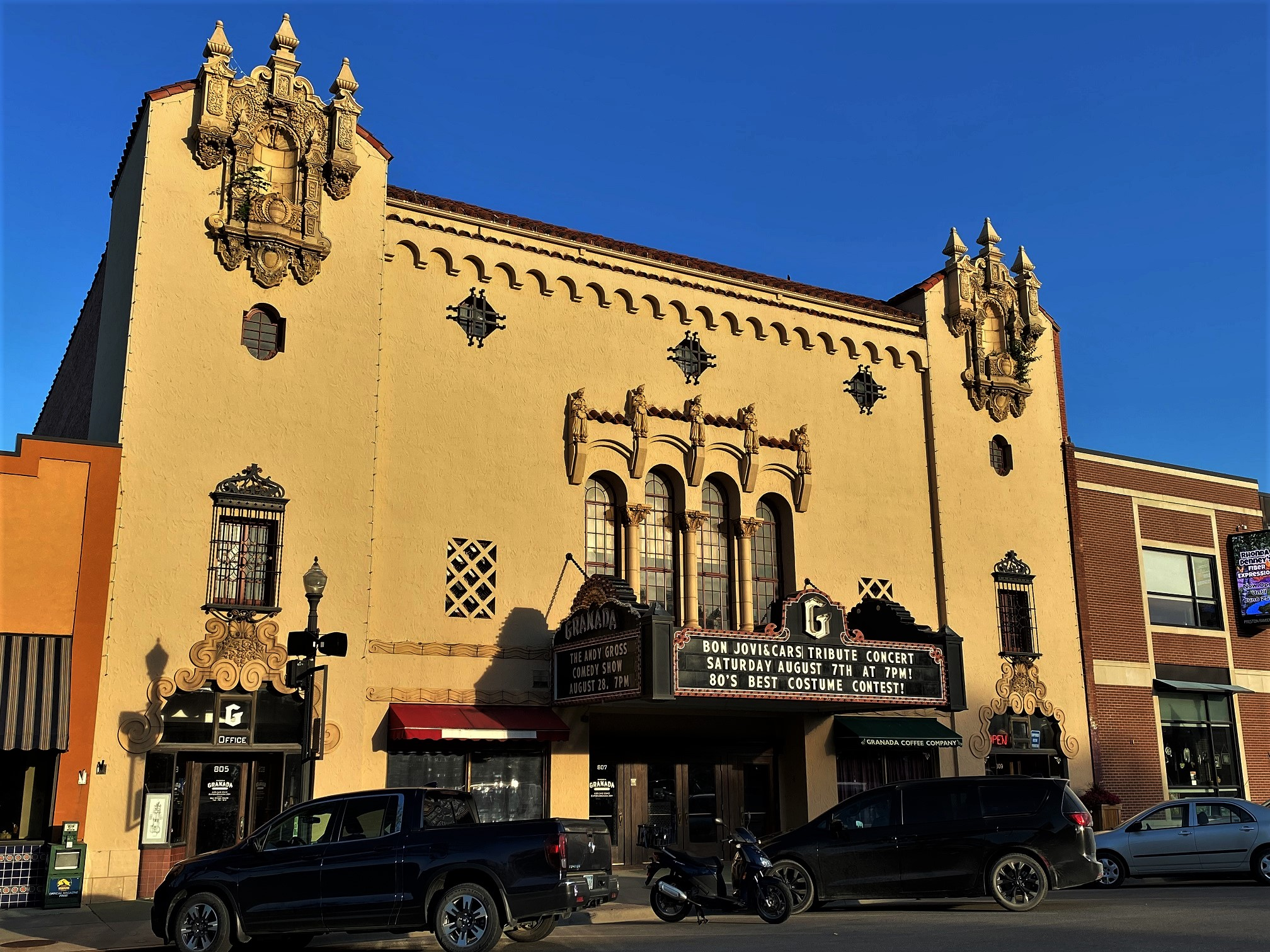

- Location within Kansas Location within the United States
- Location: 807 Commercial; Emporia, Kansas
- Coordinates: 38°24′28″N 96°10′48″W
- Area: less than one acre
- Built: 1929
- Architect: Boller Brothers
- Architectural style: Spanish Colonial Revival
- NRHP reference No.: 85000693
- Added to NRHP: April 04, 1985

The Granada Theatre is a theatre located in Emporia, Kansas, United States. It was listed on the National Register of Historic Places in 1985 and was designed by the Boller Brothers.

== History ==
The Granada Theatre was constructed in 1929 at a cost of $350,000 ($6.56 million in 2025 dollars). The theatre was dedicated on October 3, 1929, in a speech by "The Sage of Emporia," William Allen White. During its early years, the theatre attracted many famous performers. In addition to screening movies, it was used for everything from beauty contests to traveling vaudeville acts. It was leased for many years to the Fox Corporation and became known as the Fox Theatre.

Architect Robert O. Boller, of Boller Brothers, Architects, designed the Granada Theatre. Boller Brothers were nationally known theatre designers with offices in Kansas City and Los Angeles.

Like many grand old movie palaces of its era, the Granada's popularity declined during the 1960s and 70s. During this period, the building suffered from neglect and damage resulting from a leaking roof. It was closed in 1982. In April 1985, the theatre was placed on the National Register of Historic Places, but, it was not until demolition threatened the building in 1994 that a group of citizens rallied to save the theatre.

In cooperation with the Kansas Preservation Alliance, the Emporia Granada Theatre Alliance was formed and acquired the building, saving it from destruction. Since then, the Alliance members and numerous volunteers have spent countless hours stabilizing and renovating the outside of the building and preparing for the interior phase of the project. Working cooperatively with other local arts, cultural and tourism organizations, the Alliance has developed a plan to make the Granada Theatre a keystone facility – a place that builds community.

Emporia Granada Theatre Logo

== Board of directors ==
When the Emporia Granada Theatre Alliance bought the Granada Theatre in 1994, they set up a board of directors to oversee everything done at the theatre. They raised money for renovating the theatre, as well. The Director of the Granada Theatre, Brian Williams, also reports to them.

Executive Members:

- Kristi Henrikson-Mohn, President
- Gary Andrews, Vice-President
- Harry Stephens, Past-President
- Janis Meyer, Treasurer
- Mary Sue Wade, Secretary
- Sarah Harbaugh, Executive at Large
- Brad Harzman, Executive at Large

Full Board Membership:

- Sue Blechl
- Scott Bolley
- Dr. William H. Clamurro
- Tyler Curtis
- Mary Downing
- Staci Hammon
- Rachel LeClear
- Roy Mann
- Janet Miley
- Janelle North
- Paula Sauder
- Dave Stormont
- Beth Thomas
- Tom Thompson
- Marge Trayer
- Jan Traylor
- Mike TurnBull
- Norma Watson

== Notable performances ==
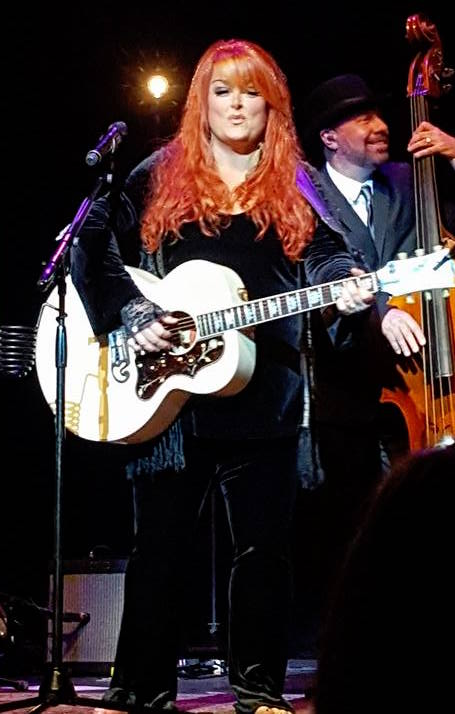
Wynonna Judd performing at the Theatre on July 24, 2016

- Joseph Hall, Top 10 finalist of America's Got Talent (season 3)
- Oak Ridge Boys
- The Bellamy Brothers
- Kelley Hunt
- Granger Smith (a.k.a. Earl Dibbles Jr.)
- Juice Newton & Exile
- Joe Diffie
- Marty Stuart & the Fabulous Superlatives
- Lorrie Morgan
- Kansas
- Wynonna Judd
- Lita Ford
