= Masonic Temple (Salina, Kansas) =

- U.S. National Register of Historic Places
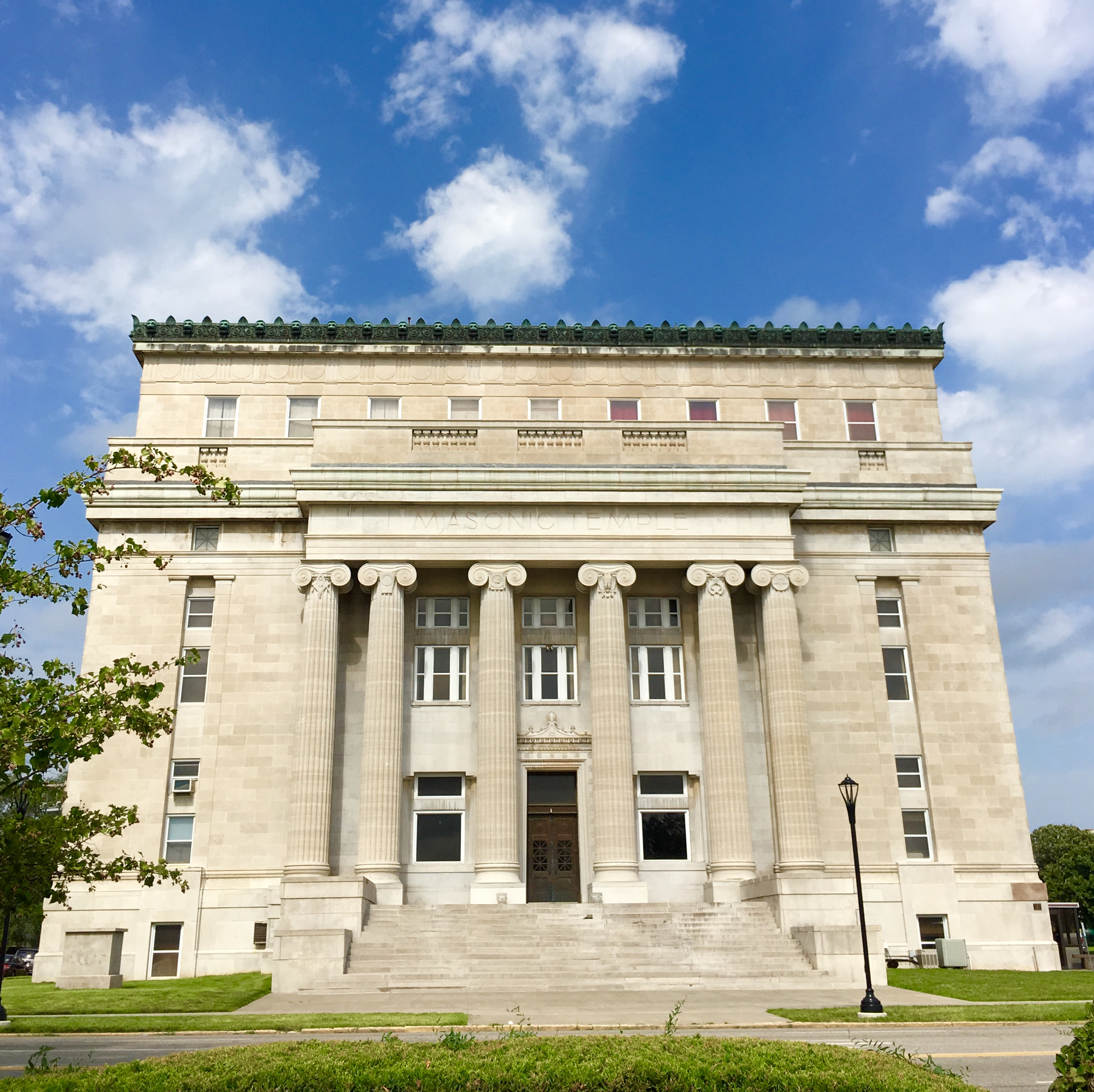
- The temple in 2016
- Location: 336 S Santa Fe Ave, Salina, Kansas
- Coordinates: 38°50′5″N 97°36′33″W
- Area: 1.7 acres (0.69 ha)
- Built: 1921–1927
- Architect: William T. Schmitt (initial); Isaac L. Zerbe (completion)
- Architectural style: Classical Revival
- NRHP reference No.: 00000192
- Added to NRHP: March 9, 2000

The Masonic Temple in Salina, Kansas, operated as The Temple since 2017, is a monumental Classical Revival-style building completed in 1927. Its seven-year construction was marked by a series of calamities, including the catastrophic collapse of its own unfinished structure in 1921 and the complete destruction by fire of the Masons' previous temple in 1922. After its initial design failed, the third and current building was completed under the direction of architect Isaac L. Zerbe. It was listed on the National Register of Historic Places in 2000.

In 2017, it was donated to the non-profit Salina Innovation Foundation, which operates it as a coworking space, an event center, and a business incubator.

== Architecture ==
The building is 125 by 170 feet (38 m × 52 m) in plan, with seven floors totaling 160,000 square feet (15,000 m^{2}). The structure is built of steel-reinforced concrete with deep foundations. The exterior is clad in Carthage stone up to the second floor, with the upper floors featuring ornate terra cotta details and a roofline surrounded by 122 hand-hammered copper gargoyles.

The building was designed around its third-floor auditorium with 1,200 seats and 104 hand-painted scenery drops from the 1920s. Major interior spaces include a two-story ballroom, a fourth-floor banquet hall with seating for 600, and several lodge rooms decorated in distinct historical revival styles. The building's general interior is finished with terrazzo floors, polished marble, "angel-wing" mirrored marble, intricate plaster work, and hand-painted murals.

== History ==
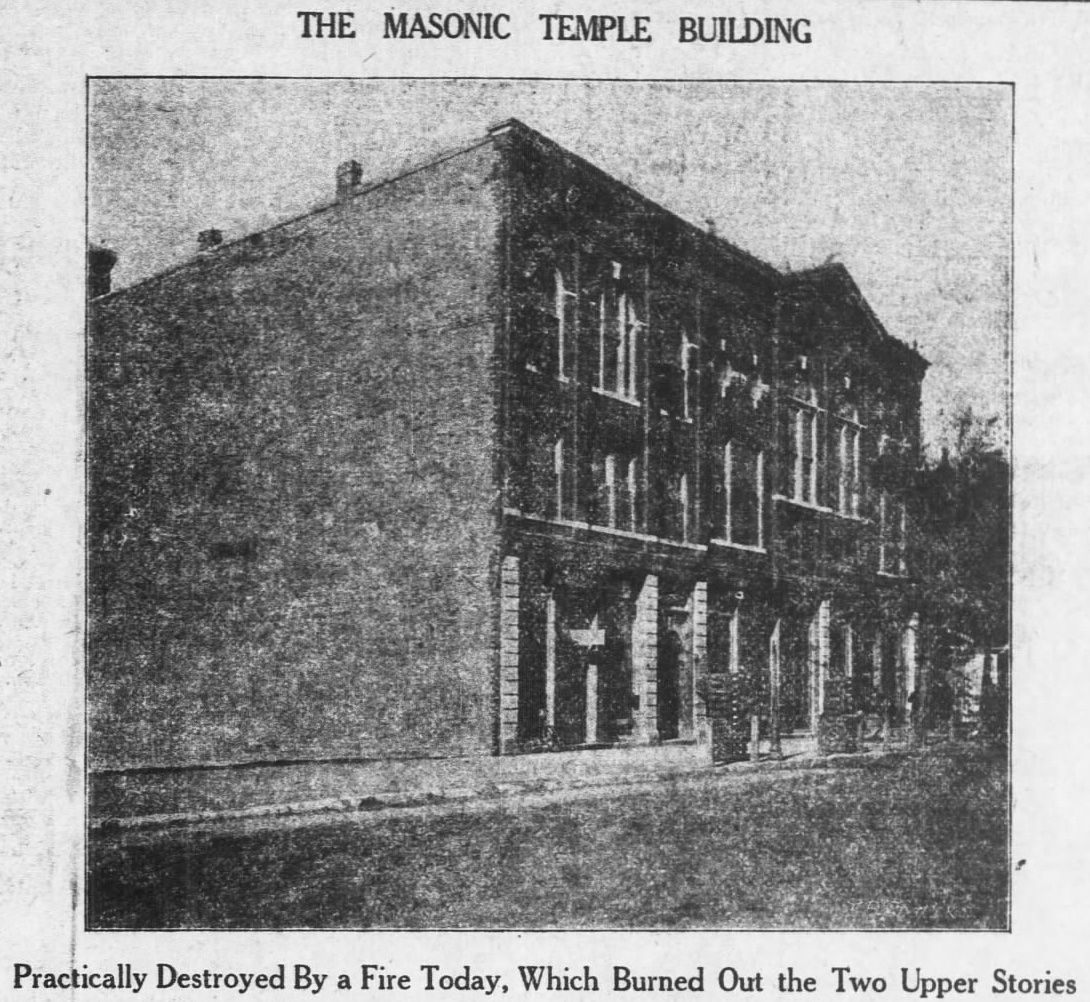
The first Masonic Temple of Salina burned in 1895 and was replaced by the Fox–Watson Theater Building in 1931.

On March 2, 1895, the first Masonic temple in Salina was destroyed by fire, started by sparks blown by strong wind from the burning neighboring Ober building. It was reportedly the biggest fire in Salina history to date, and was stopped at the temple's two-foot-thick firewall. It was located where the Fox–Watson Theater Building was later opened in 1931. In October 1895, a new, more grand temple was opened, reportedly the finest in the state. It was constructed at a different location, on the corner of Santa Fe and Iron avenues. This building hosted Salina's Masons for over 26 years.

By 1920, the Salina Masons' ambitions had outgrown the building but it remained in use during construction of a new, far larger temple. This was designed by Oklahoma City architect William T. Schmitt, estimated to cost between $750,000 and $1,000,000 (equivalent to about $16,000,000 in 2025). Construction broke ground in late 1920. It was planned to be enclosed by January 1, 1922, and entirely completed by 1923. It was to be one of the most modern, though not the largest, Masonic temples in the country. It was funded and owned by the Masonic Temple Aid Association, designed by Oklahoma City architect William T. Schmitt, engineered by Noble and Cockrell of Kansas City, and built by Eberhardt Construction, at an initially estimated total cost of US$750,000 to $1,000,000 (equivalent to about $18,100,000 in 2025). Schmidt's architectural design was checked by "two noted engineering companies", and other architects and builders periodically visited to give informal approval in passing. Construction was prepaid by the owner, in progressive stages, with no insurance.

On July 11, 1921, disaster hit the construction site with only $400,000 worth yet completed. The steel-reinforced "skeleton concrete work" structure indicated imminent collapse with about thirty seconds of notice. The Salina Daily Union reported: "The posts that were supporting the concrete roof, it is said, were not strong enough [...] The vast columns of reinforced steel were seen to tremble [..] The top of the dome of the dining room, which was the top of the fifth floor, dropped to the next floor, and carried it with other floors to the ground, and pulling with it columns, pillars, joist, and false frame work. It makes a frightful mess." It sounded like an earthquake for several blocks. Three workers were injured and none killed. Two thirds of the structure collapsed with $300,000 of damage. Schmitt was telegraphed and traveled from Oklahoma City to assess the cause.

In the aftermath, Schmitt was replaced by architect Isaac L. Zerbe of the firm Wilmarth & Zerbe, and "apparently the contractor freely consulted both plans in completing the construction".

Another disaster struck only seven months later, when the Masons' active headquarters also burned down while the replacement was still under construction. On January 30, 1922, a major gas leak caused a massive explosion that was heard across town, and the resulting fire destroyed its two upper floors of the active headquarters. The two upper floors of the original temple were destroyed by fire with damages of $100,000 to $165,000 (equivalent to $3,200,000 in 2025). The organization's paper records were rescued. Several stores located on the first floor suffered water damage, and the firefighters and utility wires were coated in ice from all the water. The disaster prompted discussion of the enlargement of the city's fire department. The most "mourned" loss was the $15,000 (equivalent to $500,000 in 2025) pipe organ on the second floor, installed in 1911 and reportedly the best in Kansas.

I have played on many organs, some large ones in cities several times larger than Salina, but I have never found an organ so satisfactory in every way and so sweet toned. It seemed to possess a peculiar sympathetic character in its tone and could be played from a whisper to a thunderous volume. Its combinations were rare and un-numbered. I have no idea how many possible combinations there were on the instrument.

— Professor W. H. Packard, Salina organist

Faced with two simultaneously destroyed buildings, the Masons spent the next five years completing the new temple under Zerbe's redesigned plans. The final Masonic Temple of Salina was completed and dedicated in November 1927, seven years after construction began.

=== Redevelopment ===
After almost one century as a Masonic center, the membership and activity declined. In 2017, the building was donated to the non-profit Salina Innovation Foundation. It was rebranded as The Temple, and repurposed as a multi-use facility. It has coworking spaces for entrepreneurs and small businesses, leasable office space, and venues for events such as weddings and conferences. The foundation has undertaken significant fundraising campaigns to finance the ongoing restoration and renovation of the building's infrastructure.
