= Fabulous Fox Theatre =

Fabulous Fox Theatre may refer to:

- Fox Theatre (Atlanta)
- Fox Theatre (St. Louis)

== See also ==
- Fox Theatre (disambiguation)
