= Lensic Theater =

Performing arts center in Santa Fe, New Mexico

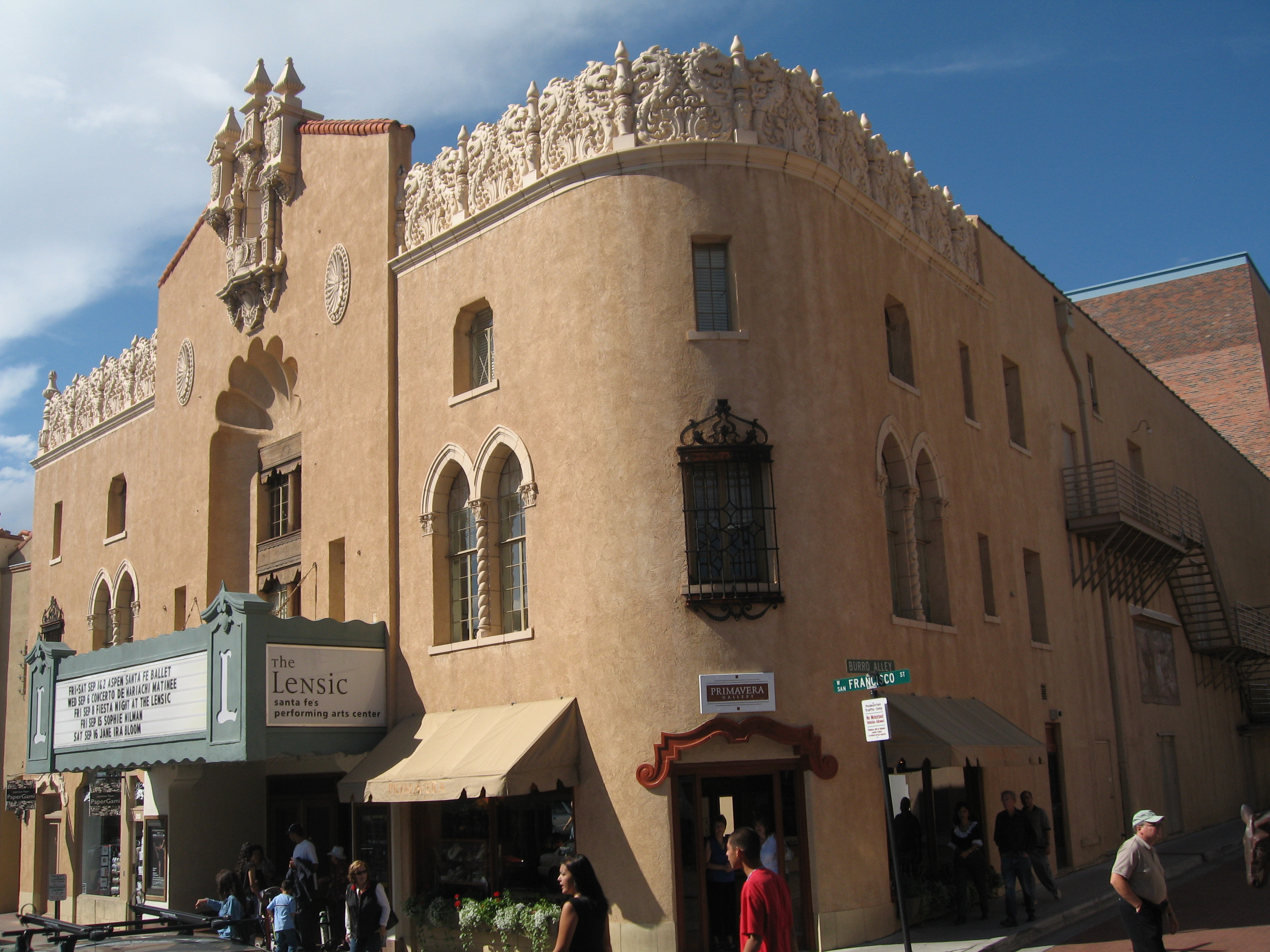
- The exterior of the pseudo-Moorish, Spanish Renaissance Lensic Theater in Santa Fe, New Mexico.
- Interactive map of Lensic Theater
- Address: 211 West San Francisco Street; Santa Fe, New Mexico; United States
- Coordinates: 35°41′16.5″N 105°56′28″W
- Capacity: 821
- Current use: performing arts center

Construction
- Opened: June 24, 1931
- Rebuilt: 1999–2001
- Architect: Boller Brothers

Website
- www.lensic.org

The Lensic Theater, located at 211 West San Francisco Street in Santa Fe, New Mexico, is an 821-seat theater designed by Boller Brothers of Kansas City, well-known movie-theater and vaudeville-house architects who designed almost one hundred theaters throughout the West and mid-West, including the KiMo Theater in Albuquerque. The pseudo-Moorish, Spanish Renaissance Lensic was built by Nathan Salmon and E. John Greer and opened on 24 June 1931. Its name derives from the initials of Greer's six grandchildren.

The Lensic was completely restored and renovated between 1999 and 2001, and provides Santa Fe and Northern New Mexico with a modern venue for the performing arts.

== Early years ==
The Lensic was a centerpiece of Santa Fe movie and vaudeville entertainment from the 1930s through the 1960s and was graced by regular appearances by well-known stars, including Rita Hayworth, Roy Rogers, Judy Garland, Errol Flynn, Ronald Reagan, and Yehudi Menuhin.

== Decline and restoration ==
Like many classic theaters in the US, the Lensic did not escape decline and deterioration from decades of use. By the end of the 1990s, The Lensic was operated and managed by United Artists film company. Its small stage size and outdated projection equipment meant that it couldn't be competitive as a multi-use venue, and thus it was used sporadically for live performance. From about 1998-1999, a non-profit group came together to raise money and restore The Lensic as a Performing Arts Center. In December 2000, the National Trust for Historic Preservation recognized the Lensic as an official project of Save America's Treasures. In April 2001, the restoration and renovation of the Lensic was completed.

A primary goal of the renovation was to provide a superior performance venue for music and dramatic productions. The rear wall was removed to increase the depth of the stage house, and the installation of advanced lighting and sound systems allowed the restored Lensic to meet that goal. The unique architectural and ornamental details were painstakingly restored. The total cost of the renovation was approximately $9 million.

Today the Lensic is the major performance venue in Santa Fe and is used by the Santa Fe Chamber Music Festival, the Santa Fe Symphony Orchestra and Chorus, the Santa Fe Desert Chorale, the Santa Fe Short Story Festival, the Aspen Santa Fe Ballet and Performance Santa Fe (which sponsors a variety of music, dance, and theater events). In addition, it functions as the location for ballet and lectures, for touring companies, and is still the venue for the screening of classic films on an occasional basis.

== Details ==
- Stage Dimensions
  - Height: 22 ft (6.7 m)
  - Width: 40 ft (12 m)
  - Depth: up to 40 ft (12 m)
- Seating Capacity
  - Orchestra level: 504 (max)
  - Balcony level: 317
