= Granada Theater (Kansas City, Kansas) =

- U.S. National Register of Historic Places
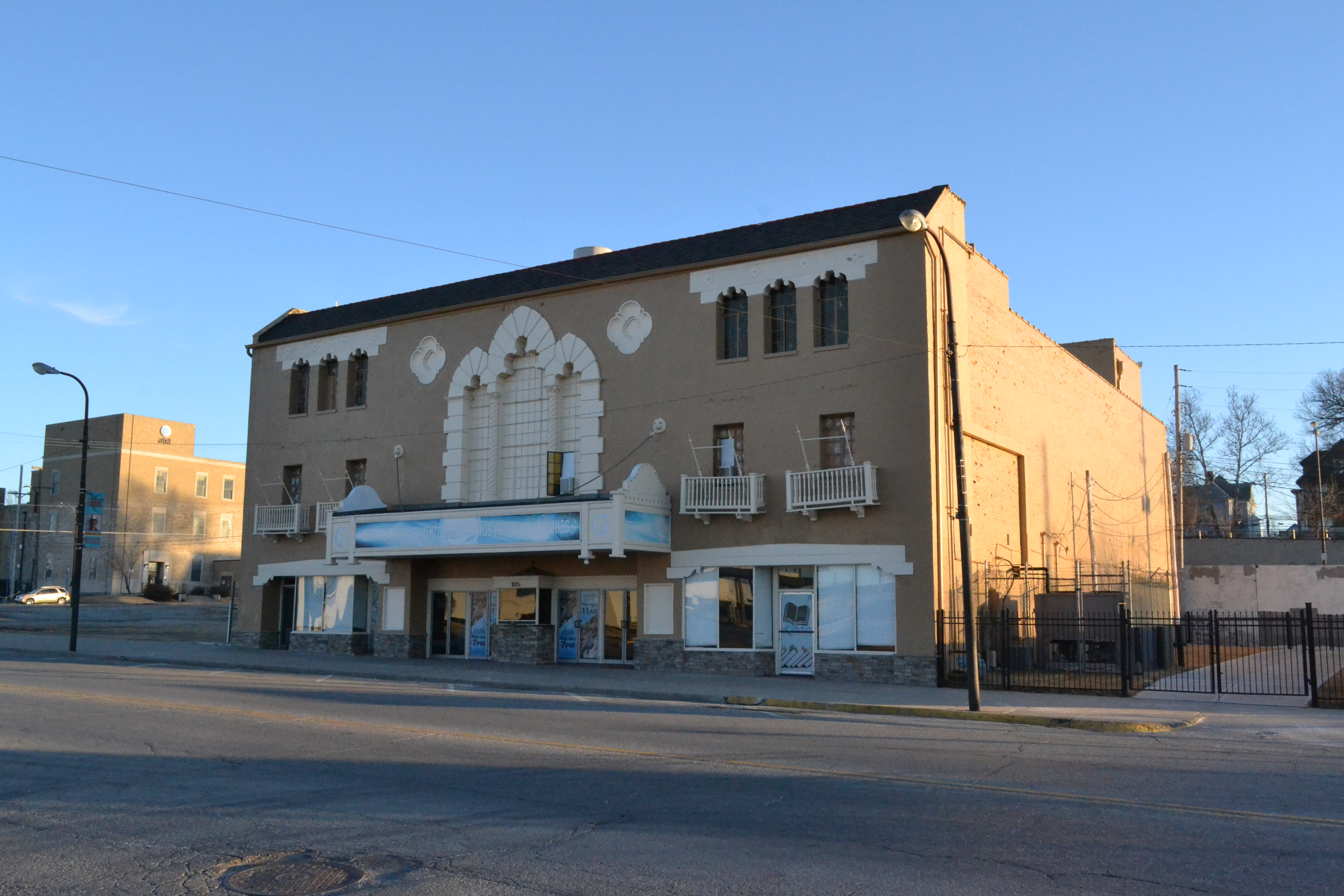

- Location within Kansas Location within the United States
- Location: 1013–1019 Minnesota Ave., Kansas City, Kansas
- Coordinates: 39°06′55″N 94°38′09″W
- Area: Less than 1 acre (0.40 ha)
- Built: 1929
- Architect: Boller Brothers
- Architectural style: Mission/Spanish Revival
- MPS: Theaters and Opera Houses of Kansas MPS
- NRHP reference No.: 05000004
- Added to NRHP: February 9, 2005

The Granada Theater is a grand movie palace in Kansas City's historic downtown in Wyandotte County, Kansas. The theater is designed in the Mission style with Spanish and Moorish influences. Dominating the facade is a large Palladian window, flanked by terracotta pieces. Below the window is the main entrance, which centers on a glass ticket booth. The eastern and western ends of the facade's first floor are occupied by small storefronts.

== History ==
Ben Gorman and William A. Toplikar arranged for the theater's erection in 1928, contracting with the Boller Brothers to perform the construction. The theater flourished until the 1960s, when the rising popularity of television reduced the profitability of traditional theaters; after it closed late in the decade, it was periodically reopened by others, but none lasted long. In 2005, the theater was listed on the National Register of Historic Places, qualifying because of its architecture and its place in the area's history.
