= Rio Theatre (Overland Park, Kansas) =

Theater in Overland Park, Kansas, US

- Overland Theatre, Overland Theater, Kimo South, Park Cinema, Theatre for Young America
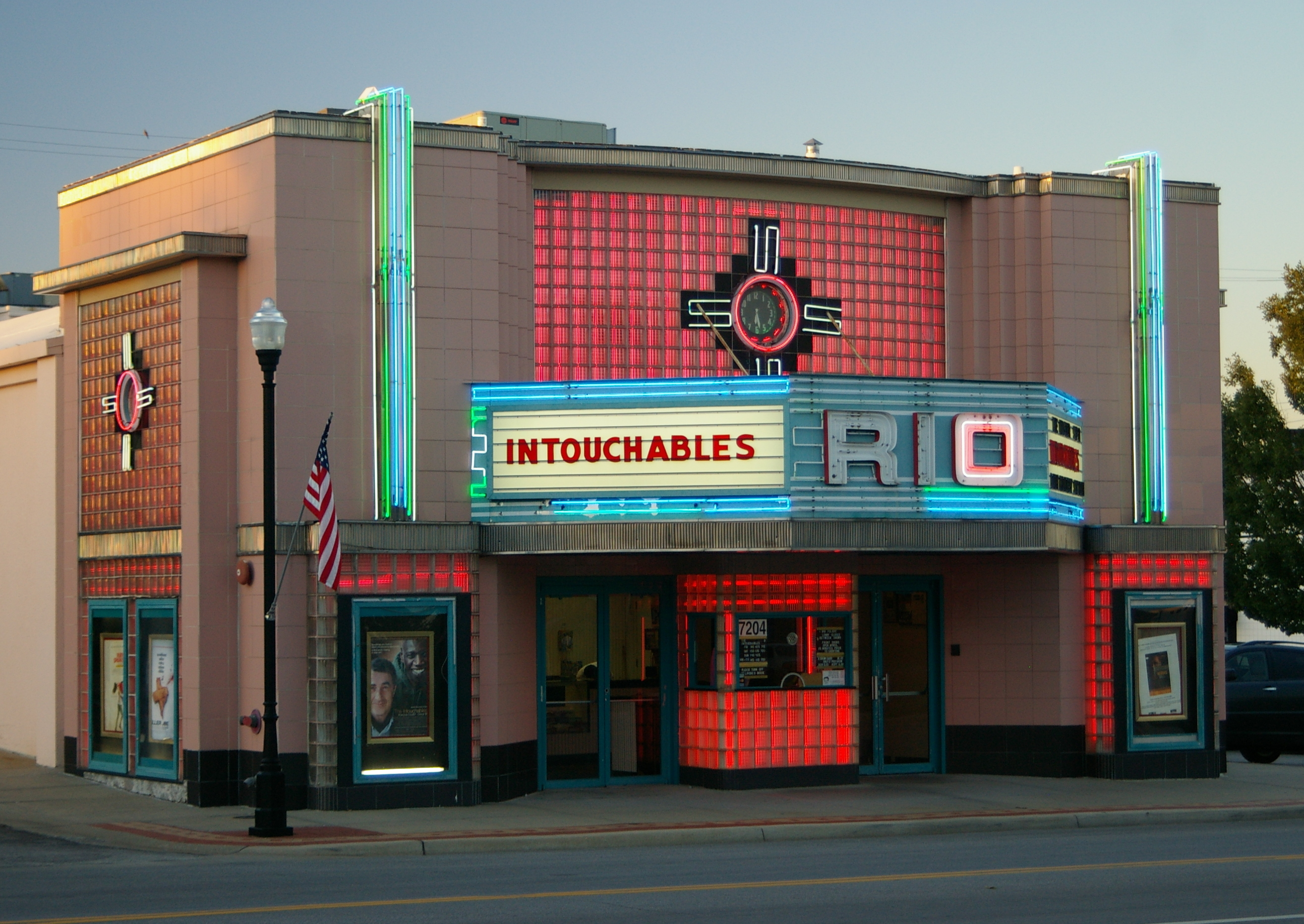
- Rio Theater in September 2012
- Interactive map of Rio Theatre
- Address: 7204 W 80th Street; Overland Park, Kansas; United States
- Coordinates: 38°59′04″N 94°40′09″W
- Owner: Fine Arts Group
- Capacity: 281

Construction
- Opened: December 25, 1946
- Architect: Robert O. Boller

Website
- fineartsgroup.com/rio/
- Overland Theater
- U.S. National Register of Historic Places
- Architectural style: Moderne architecture
- NRHP reference No.: 05000009
- Added to NRHP: February 9, 2005

The Rio Theatre is a historic single-screen movie theater in Overland Park, Kansas. It opened on December 25, 1946, to replace two earlier local cinemas that had closed during the Great Depression. Commissioned by the Dickinson Theatre Group and designed by Robert O. Boller of the Boller Brothers firm, the 600-seat single-screen venue marked the end of a ten-year absence of a movie theater in Overland Park. The theater's design and architecture is an example of the Moderne-style, incorporating the use of teal neon lights, peach porcelain tiles, glass blocks, and aluminum trim. The theater was purchased by the City of Overland Park in 1987 for historic preservation purposes. It was sold to the Fine Arts Theatre Group in 1993, which undertook extensive renovations to restore the building to its original appearance. The theater reopened in 2000 as the independent Rio Theatre. The theater closed in March 2020 due to the COVID-19 pandemic and underwent renovations, and as of July 2024, it has not yet reopened.

On February 9, 2005, the theater was placed on the National Register of Historic Places.

In 2026, funding was approved to renovate and reopen the theater.
