= Majestic Theatre (East St. Louis) =

- U.S. National Register of Historic Places
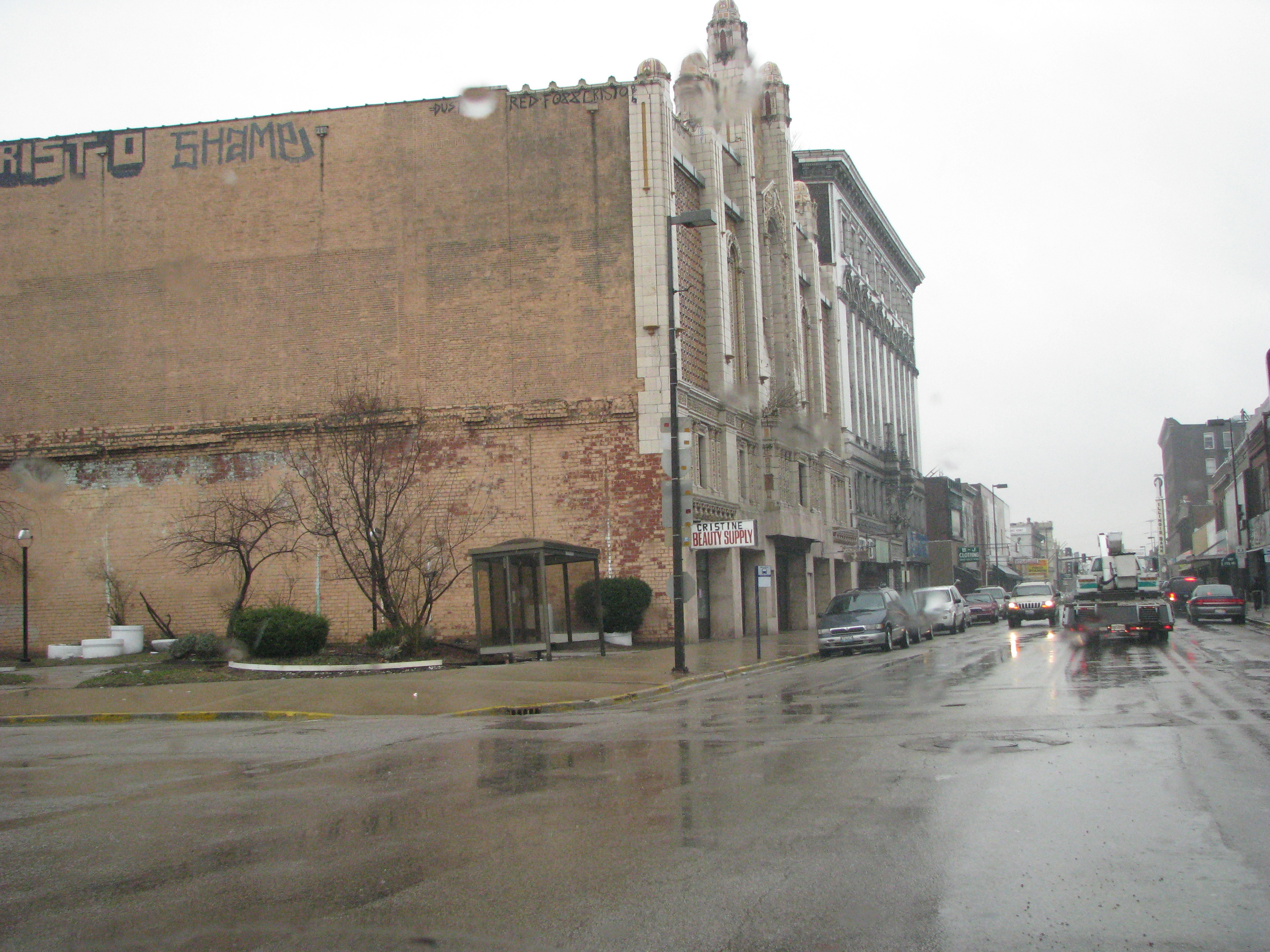
- Side view of the theatre

- Location within Illinois Location within the United States
- Location: 240–246 Collinsville Ave., East St. Louis, Illinois
- Coordinates: 38°37′38″N 90°9′28″W
- Area: less than one acre
- Built: 1928
- Architect: Boller Bros.
- Architectural style: Spanish Gothic
- NRHP reference No.: 85000977
- Added to NRHP: May 9, 1985

The Majestic Theatre is a historic movie theater located at 240–246 Collinsville Ave. in East St. Louis, Illinois. Built in 1928, the theater replaced a 1907 theater which had burned down. The Spanish Gothic theater was designed by the Boller Brothers, who were nationally prominent theater architects. Multicolored tiles decorate the building's front façade, forming patterned mosaics. The front façade also features piers with decorative peaks and tall arched windows. The theater attracted numerous celebrities to its grand opening, and it represented several firsts among East St. Louis cinemas; it was the first in the city with a modern air conditioning system and the first in Southern Illinois to show talkies. The theater closed in the 1960s.

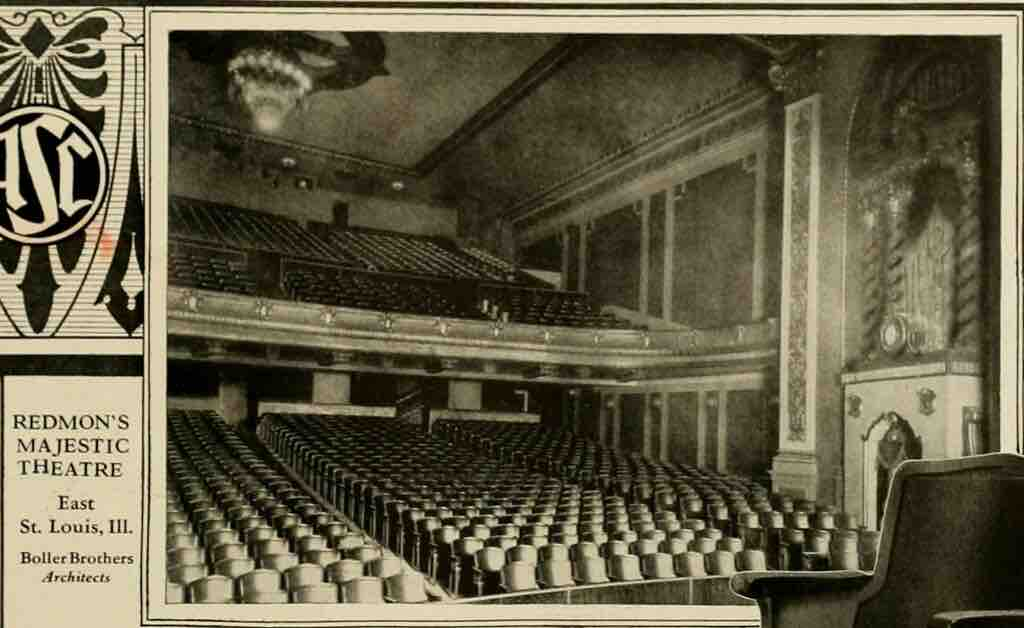
Advertisement from the American Seating Company, 1928.

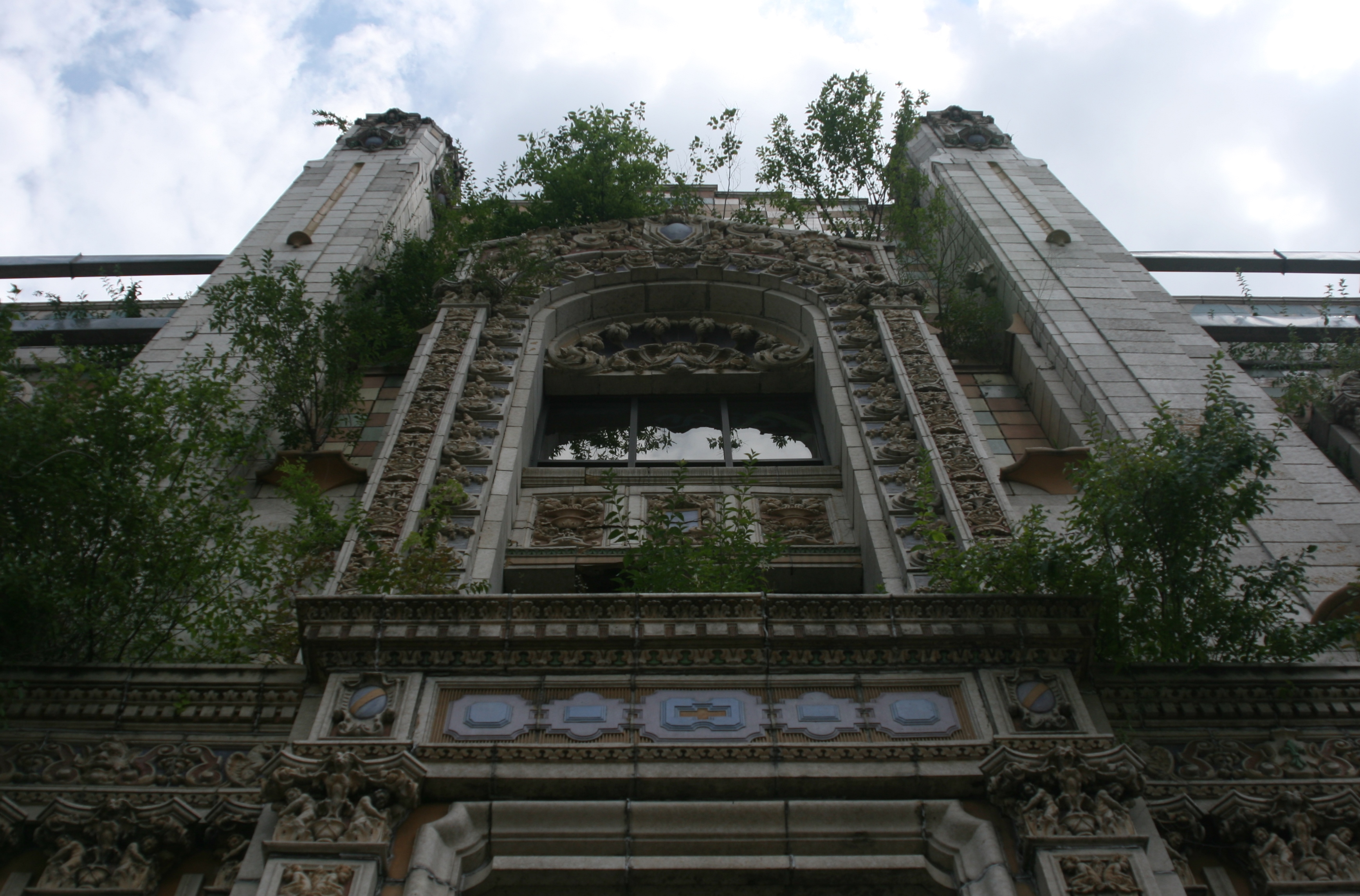
The front facade of the theatre, now overgrown with weeds.

The theater was added to the National Register of Historic Places on May 9, 1985.
