= Hollywood Theater (Leavenworth, Kansas) =

- U.S. National Register of Historic Places
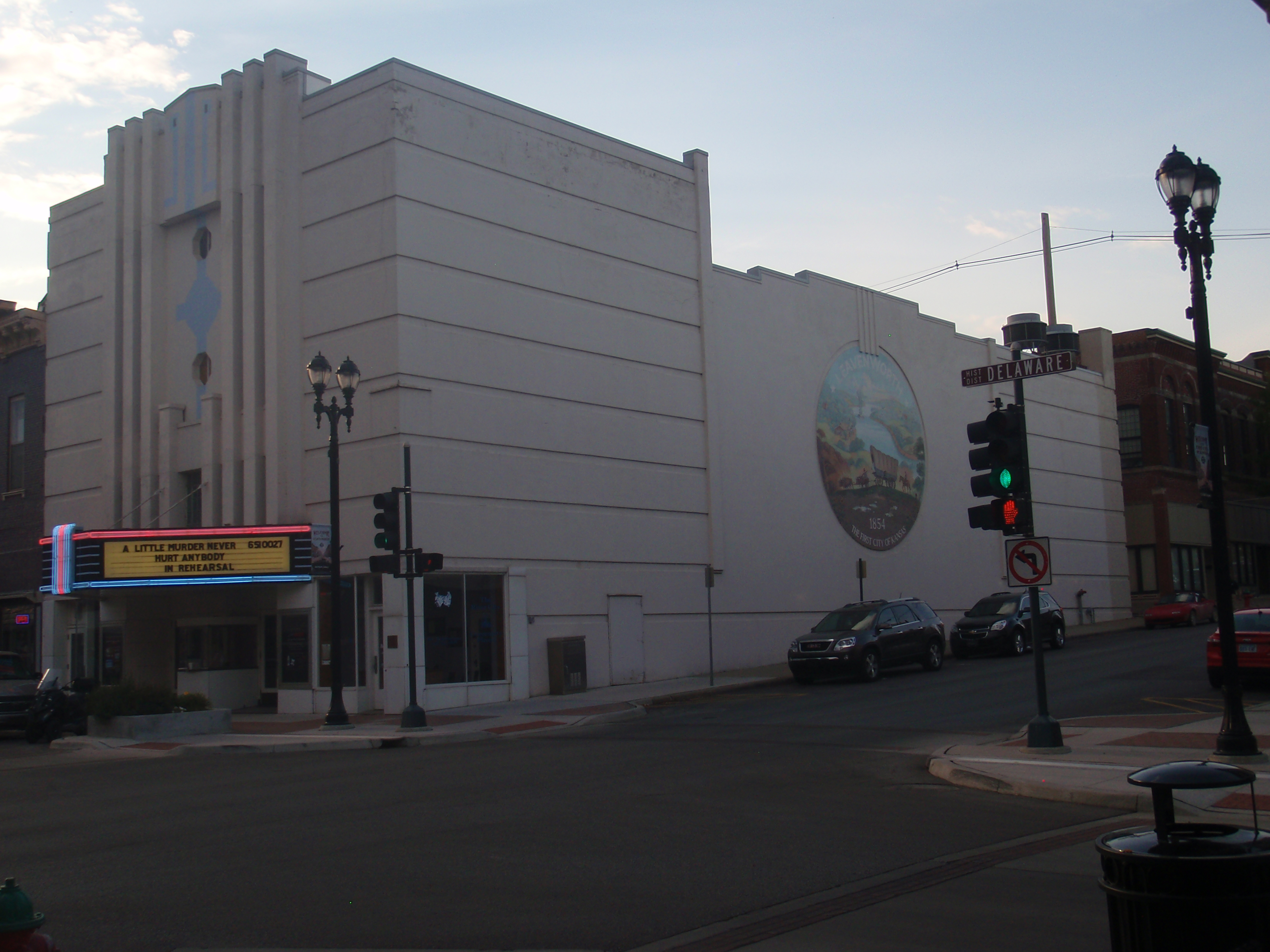

- Location within Kansas Location within the United States
- Location: 401 Delaware St., Leavenworth, Kansas
- Built: c. 1937-38
- Architect: Robert Boller, Boller Brothers
- Architectural style: Art Deco
- NRHP reference No.: 90001575
- Added to NRHP: October 25, 1990

Hollywood Theater is a historic Art Deco theater building in Leavenworth, Kansas. Designed by Robert Boller of the Boller Brothers, it is typical of theaters that were designed to be showcases in the 1920s and 1930s. It was built about 1937 or 1938 and opened on July 23, 1938. The historic building was listed on the National Register of Historic Places in 1990.

It was designed by Robert Bollers of the Kansas City, Missouri-based Boller Brothers architectural firm. It is 108 by 48.25 feet (32.92 m × 14.71 m) in plan and 44 feet (13 m) high.

The theater closed in 1977 and was acquired by the city. Now a performing arts center, it hosts the River City Community Players.

== See also ==
- National Register of Historic Places listings in Leavenworth County, Kansas
