= Booth Theater (Independence, Kansas) =

- U.S. National Register of Historic Places
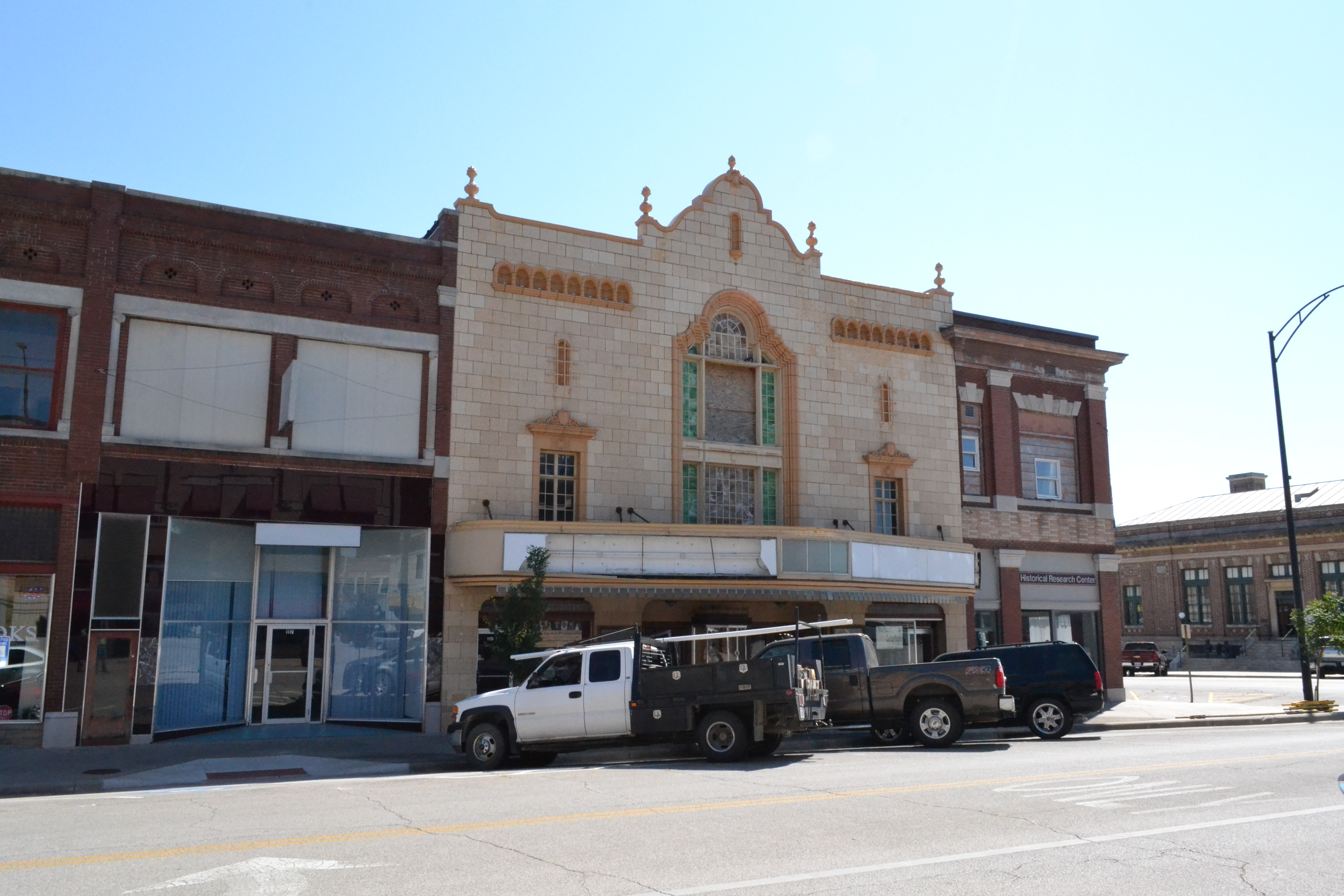

- Location within Kansas Location within the United States
- Location: 119 W. Myrtle St., Independence, Kansas
- Coordinates: 37°13′31″N 95°42′22″W
- Area: less than one acre
- Built: 1911
- Architect: Boller Brothers
- Architectural style: Late 19th And 20th Century Revivals, Mission/Spanish Revival, Italian Renaissance
- NRHP reference No.: 88001903
- Added to NRHP: October 13, 1988

The Booth Theater is a historic movie theater located at 119 W. Myrtle St. in Independence, Kansas. The building was constructed in 1911 and renovated for use as a movie theater in 1926–27. The redesigned theater was the first in Independence to be designed specifically for use as a movie theater. The Boller Brothers, an architectural firm known for their theater designs, designed the theater in a mixture of the Spanish Renaissance and Italian Renaissance Revival styles. The theater showed films until its closure in 1980.

The theater was listed on the National Register of Historic Places in 1988.
