= Fox Theatre (Springfield) =

Theater in Springfield, Missouri, United States

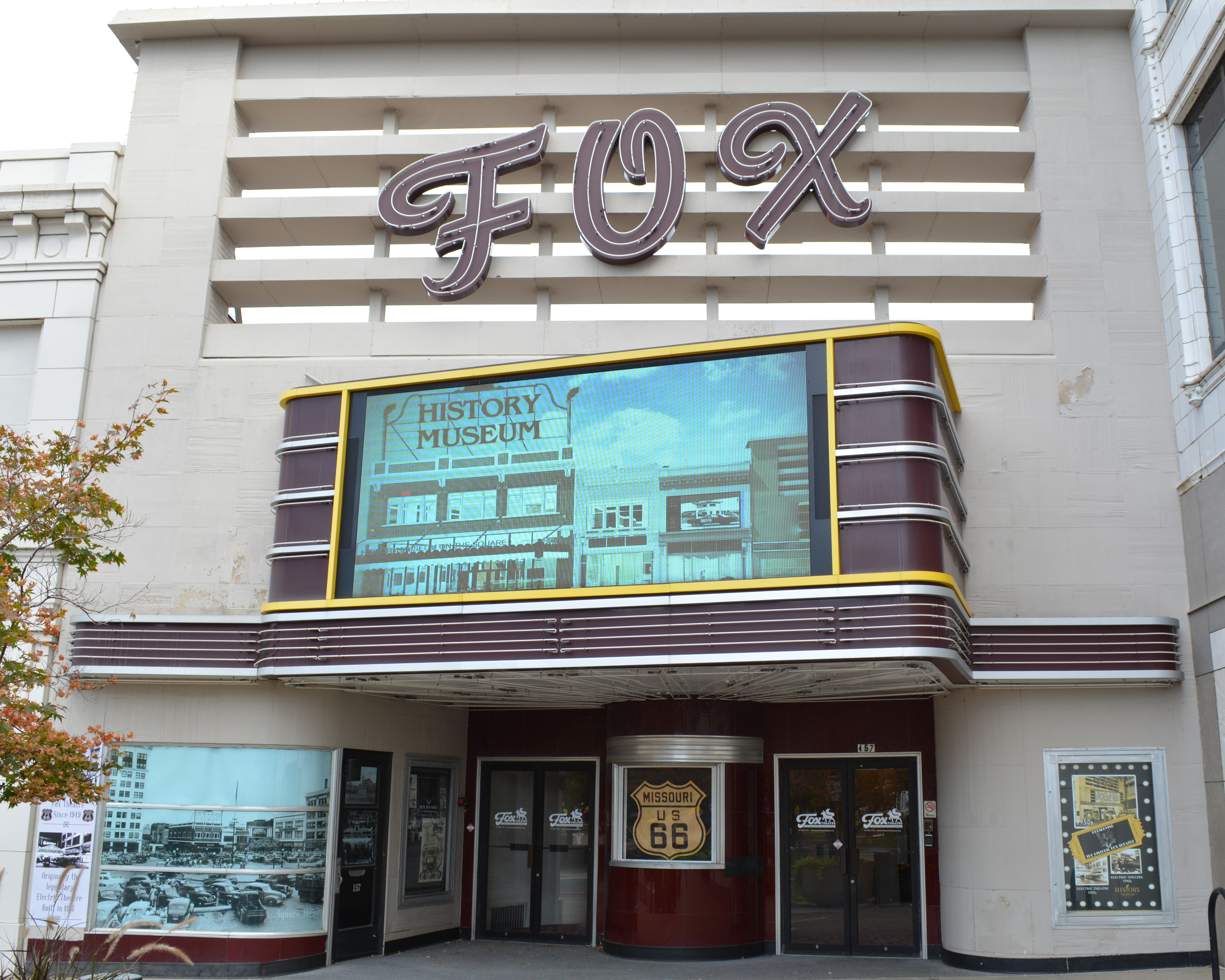
- The Fox Theatre in Springfield, MO (ca. 2025)
- Interactive map of Fox Theatre (Springfield)
- Former names: Electric Theatre
- Location: 157 Park Central Square; Springfield, Missouri, United States
- Coordinates: 37°12′34″N 93°17′31″W
- Owner: History Museum on the Square
- Capacity: 550
- Type: Concert venue

Construction
- Opened: 1916
- Renovated: 1930, 1947, 2014+
- Architects: Carl and Robert Boller

Website
- historicfoxtheatre.org

The Fox Theatre, is an historic auditorium and movie palace in Springfield, Missouri. Located in the northeast corner of the downtown square, the theatre operates to this day. It opened in 1916, has changed hands numerous times, remodeled in 1930 and 1947, and most recently has been taken under ownership by the Historic Museum on the Square.

== History ==
In 1913, Electric Theatre, of Kansas City, purchased the land to construct a venue on the Springfield square. The Boller Brothers were the chosen architects, G.T. Noel was brought in for interior design, and Oliver J. Corbett was a commissioned painter. At the time, it was said, "without a doubt the nicest theatre in South Missouri." In 1916 the theater opened as the Electric Theatre with Theda Bara's "Her Double Life".

For a few short years starting in 1930, Paramount owned the theater before selling it to Fox Theatres in 1933. Fox retained and used the name "Electric Theatre", unlike most of their other theaters. However, due to a large fire in 1946, Fox remodeled and renamed the theater in 1947 to become "The Fox Theatre". It would continue to operate as a first-run theater in Springfield until closing in 1982.

Abundant Life Church operated in the theater for 32 years until the History Museum on the Square (Springfield's regional history museum) took over in 2014. The museum continues to maintain the theater, and has restored operation as a performance venue. Most notably, the museum hosts an annual live tribute to the Ozark Jubilee, which was based out of Springfield's Jewel Theatre throughout the 1950s.

Today, the 1947 remodel is the current aesthetic of the exterior and interior, as extensive work has been undertaken to preserve the theater's historical allure. The halls still maintain preserved murals by local artist George Kieffer.
