= Jayhawk Theatre =

Theater in Topeka, Kansas, US

Jayhawk State Theatre of Kansas
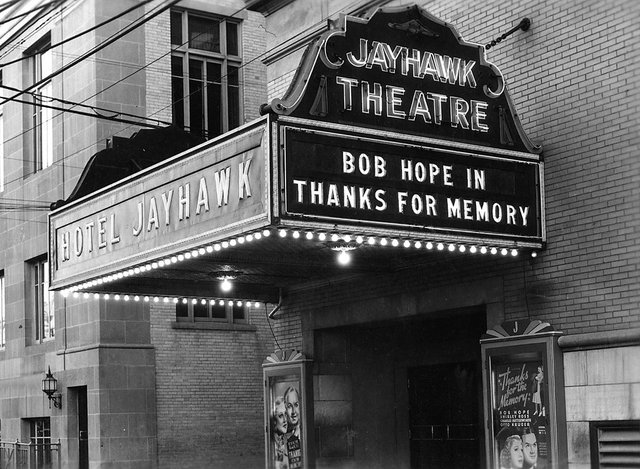
- Photo of original marquee
- Address: 720 SW Jackson St. Topeka, Kansas; United States
- Owner: Jayhawk Theatre Inc. (501(c)(3) Non-Profit)
- Operator: Jayhawk Theatre Inc.
- Capacity: 300 (2008–present); 1550 (original)

Construction
- Opened: August 16, 1926
- Closed: 1976
- Architects: Thomas W. Williamson; Boller Brothers

Website
- jayhawktheatre.org
- Jayhawk Theatre
- U.S. National Register of Historic Places
- Architect: Thomas W. Williamson
- NRHP reference No.: 82002675
- Added to NRHP: March 11, 1982

The Historic Jayhawk State Theatre of Kansas, is a theater located in downtown Topeka, Kansas, United States. The theatre opened on August 16, 1926. The Jayhawk Hotel & Crosby Bros shopping complex where attached to the theatre making it a grand complex for visitors to eat, sleep and be entertained.

The Jayhawk Theatre closed in January 1976 and sat vacant until the building complex was purchased in the 1980s. The theatre was donated to a non-profit organization in 1993 after a demolition denial request was submitted to the Topeka City Council.

== Design ==
The Jayhawk Theatre and arcade was the vision of native Topekan, E.H. Crosby, head of the Crosby Brothers Co. It was designed by architect Thomas W. Williamson of Topeka, KS using work from the Boller Brothers of Kansas City. The work was completed in 1926, at a cost of approximately 1 million dollars. Built of steel and concrete, the auditorium is open, requiring no support posts that might obscure the view. The domed roof had twinkling stars to represent the heavens. Featuring three levels, two grand staircases lead from the lobby to the mezzanine floor, where a luxurious lounge was located.
The stage features an ornate proscenium arch with a beautiful mural by William Peaco of Chicago, whose work was featured in many public buildings in the Midwest. The mural depicts the goddess of agriculture surrounded by state symbols and the Seal of Kansas.

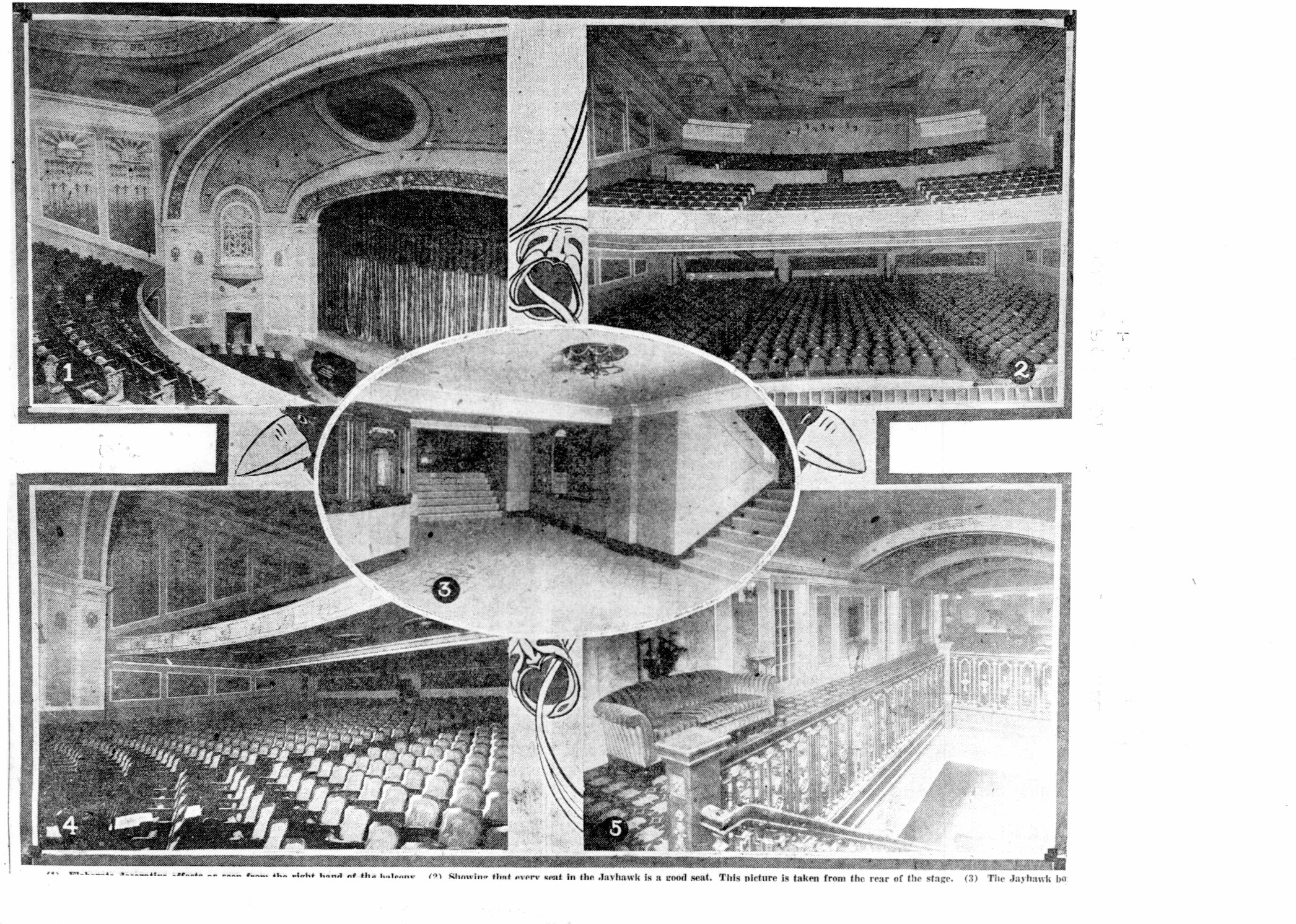

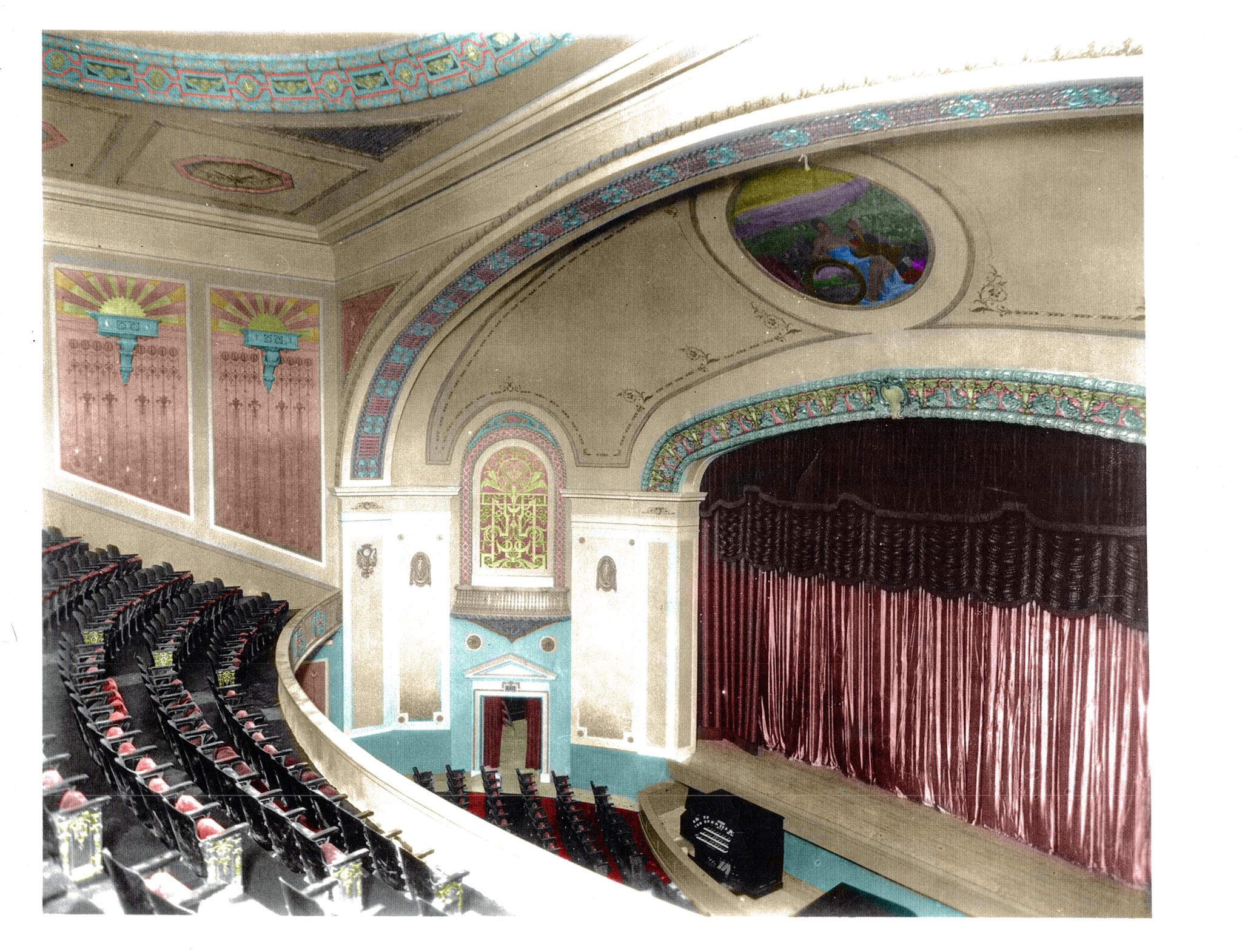

== Ownership ==
The Jayhawk Theatre is owned and operated by a 501(c)(3) non-profit organization called the Historic Jayhawk Theatre Inc. In 1993 the Kansas State Legislature designated the Jayhawk as the official State Theatre of Kansas.

== Redevelopment ==
Historic Jayhawk Theatre Inc. is dedicated to renovation, modernization and preservation of the historic Jayhawk State Theatre of Kansas. The organization is accepting donations, fundraising and hosting events to raise the funds to do so.

== The Gallery ==
The Gallery was added in February 2007 and features artists from Topeka, Kansas. The gallery is located in the future lobby space of the theatre and currently operates as an art gallery, event space, small music venue, and gathering location for volunteers who meet weekly.

== Notable Acts ==
New Year's Eve of 1929, Gypsy Rose Lee performed live on-stage at the Jayhawk Theatre.
