= Santa Fe Chamber Music Festival =

- Genre: chamber music
- Dates: July/August
- Location: Santa Fe, New Mexico
- Coordinates: 35.6901°N 105.9411°W
- Years active: 1972-present
- Website: www.santafechambermusic.com

The Santa Fe Chamber Music Festival is a six-week-long summer Festival of chamber music held annually in July and August and located in Santa Fe, New Mexico. It was founded in 1972 and presented its first series of concerts in 1973. Well-known musicians and young performers appear each season in concerts presented in the St. Francis Auditorium and the restored Lensic Theater.

In its inaugural year Pablo Casals acted as honorary president. The Festival has contributed to the contemporary chamber music repertoire by commissioning over 120 pieces from emerging and well-known composers, including Aaron Copland, Ned Rorem, Ellen Taaffe Zwilich, and John Harbison. Marc Neikrug has been artistic director since the late 1990s.

Participating musicians in the festival's history included Yuja Wang, Walter Trampler and Andre-Michel Schub.

Major venues include Lensic Performing Arts Center and St. Francis Auditorium in the New Mexico Museum of Art.

A radio series from the festival is broadcast by the WFMT Radio Network.
