= Crown Uptown Theatre =

1920s theatre in Wichita, Kansas

- Exterior of the Crown Uptown Theatre on East Douglas Avenue
- Interactive map of Crown Uptown Theatre
- Location: 3207 East Douglas Avenue, Wichita, Kansas, United States
- Coordinates: 37°41′07″N 97°17′18″W
- Owner: Jim Basham
- Type: Historic atmospheric theatre; live performances, concerts, event venue
- Events: Music, theatre, comedy, weddings, banquets
- Capacity: ~1,500 (original seating); current capacity varies by event type

Construction
- Built: July 1928

Website
- CrownUptown.com

Crown Uptown Theatre is an atmospheric theatre located in the College Hill neighborhood, along East Douglas Avenue within the Douglas Design District, east of downtown Wichita, Kansas. Designed by the Boller Brothers and built by George Siedhoff, the theatre opened in July 1928. It has served multiple roles over its history, including as a first-run movie house, a Cinerama venue, a dinner theatre and a live performance and events venue.

== History ==
The theatre opened on July 16, 1928 with the showing of The Jazz Singer. It was constructed in atmospheric style, the auditorium featuring architecture to evoke an outdoor courtyard under the sky, with decorative plasterwork, gardenscape elements, ornate proscenium arch and a starry ceiling effect.

In 1961, it was remodeled for Cinerama, reopening as the "New Uptown Theatre" to accommodate widescreen, immersive cinema experiences. It later ceased movie operations in the mid-1970s and was converted into Crown Uptown Dinner Theatre in 1977, offering dinner-show performances and events.

Ownership changed in 2017 when Mike Garvey acquired the theatre, followed by manager Jim Basham purchasing it in 2019. In recent years, proposals to increase occupancy and functionality have encountered regulatory concerns, especially around parking and fire safety.

== Architecture and features ==
- Designed in the atmospheric theatre style by the Boller Brothers.
- Original construction included ~1,500 seats with a balcony, garden-themed side wall decorations, and organ grilles styled as balconies.
- The interior includes an “open sky” ceiling, illusion lighting, and ornate Spanish/Moorish‐inspired plaster details.
- Modern upgrades include enhanced sound and lighting systems and acoustical treatments.

== Usage and Tenants ==
Crown Uptown operates primarily as a live performance venue. It hosts concerts, theatrical shows, comedy events, weddings, banquets, and similar private or public gatherings. It is a major landmark within College Hill and the broader Douglas Design District.

== Recent Developments ==
In 2023–2025, there have been municipal and preservation conversations regarding expansion, historic status, and regulatory compliance. For example, a proposal to increase its official occupancy was rejected due to safety and parking issues, and there is ongoing debate over whether the building should be added to the Register of Historic Places. In July 2025, the Wichita City Council voted against adding the theatre to the city's historic register.

== Significance ==
Crown Uptown is one of Wichita’s surviving atmospheric theatres, representative of early-20th century theatre architecture and entertainment culture. It contributes to the character of the College Hill neighborhood and serves as an illustrative case of historic preservation intertwined with modern entertainment and community use.

== See also ==
- Atmospheric theatre
- College Hill, Wichita, Kansas
- Old Town District
- Douglas Design District
- Boller Brothers
