= El Morro Theater =

- U.S. National Register of Historic Places
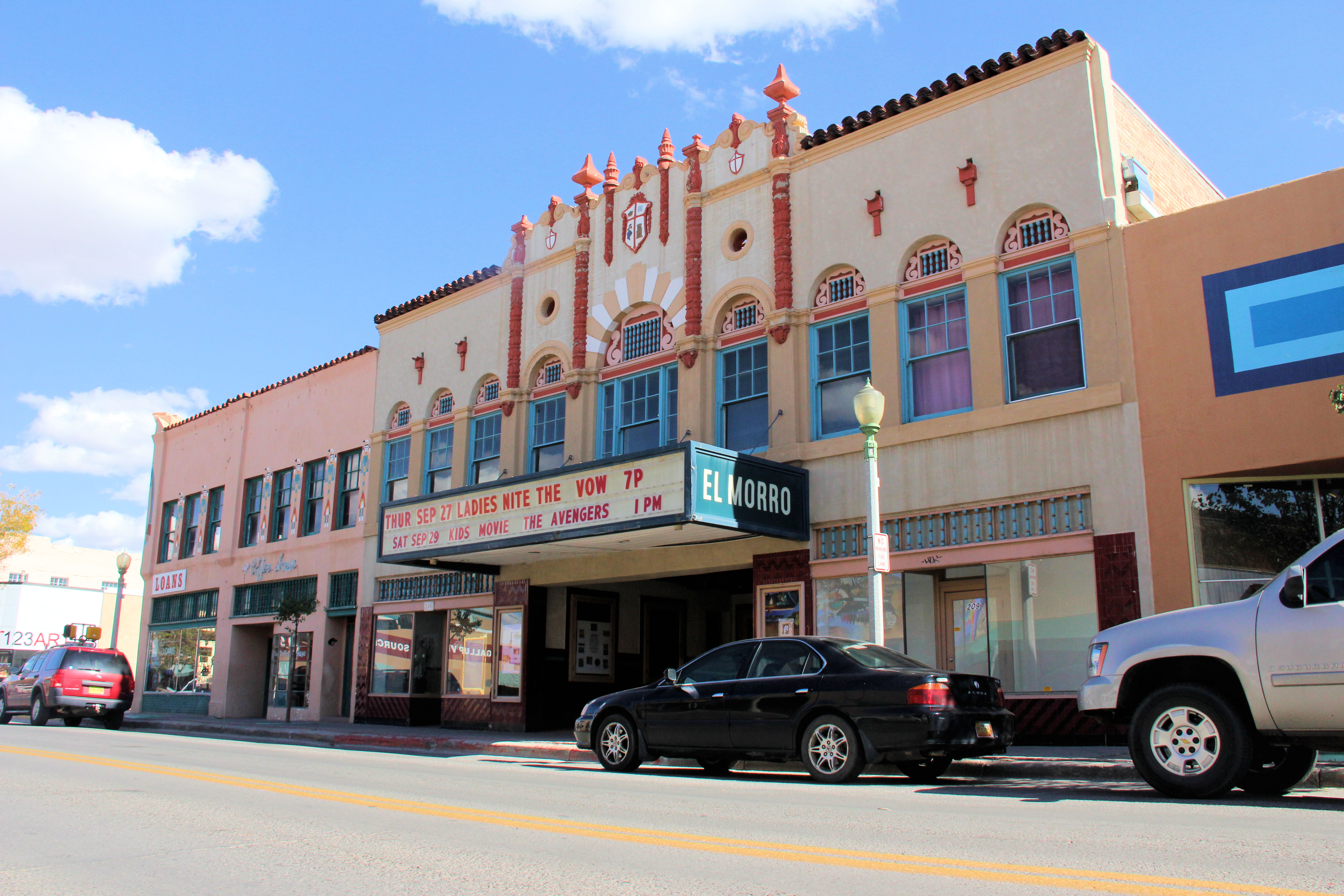
- Location: 205-209 W. Coal Ave., Gallup, New Mexico
- Coordinates: 35°33′14″N 108°44′28″W
- Area: less than one acre
- Built: 1928
- Architect: Carl Boller
- Architectural style: Spanish Colonial Revival architecture
- MPS: Downtown Gallup MRA
- NRHP reference No.: 87002221
- Added to NRHP: May 16, 1988

The El Morro Theater in Gallup, New Mexico was built in 1928. It was listed on the National Register of Historic Places in 1988.

It was deemed notable as "the only example of Spanish Colonial Revival architecture in Gallup." It was designed by Carl Boller, of the Boller Brothers architectural firm. It is a two-story building with a barrel vault roof.
