= Fox Theater (Hutchinson, Kansas) =

- U.S. National Register of Historic Places
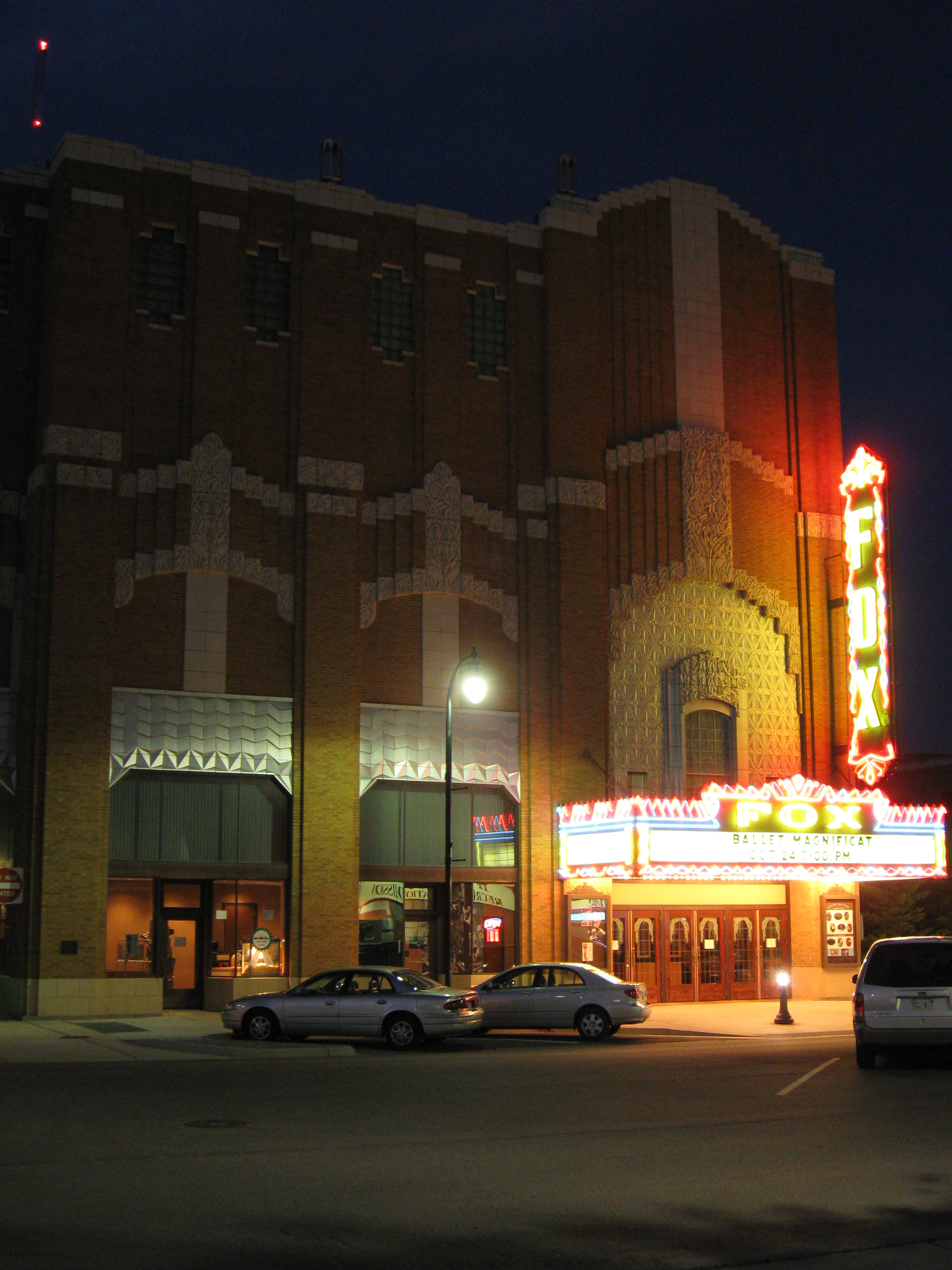
- At night, with the marquee lit.

- Location within Kansas Location within the United States
- Location: 18 E. First, Hutchinson, Kansas
- Coordinates: 38°3′16″N 97°55′48″W
- Built: 1930
- Built by: Ed C. Clinker
- Architect: Boller Brothers; Mann, A.R. and Co.
- Architectural style: Art Deco
- Website: http://www.hutchinsonfox.com
- NRHP reference No.: 89001391
- Added to NRHP: September 7, 1989

The Fox Theater in Hutchinson, Kansas is an Art Deco theater built in 1930. It was listed on the National Register of Historic Places in 1989.

It was designed by the Boller Brothers, and A.R. Mann and Co. served as supervising architects.
