= New Theatre (Fort Smith, Arkansas) =

- U.S. National Register of Historic Places
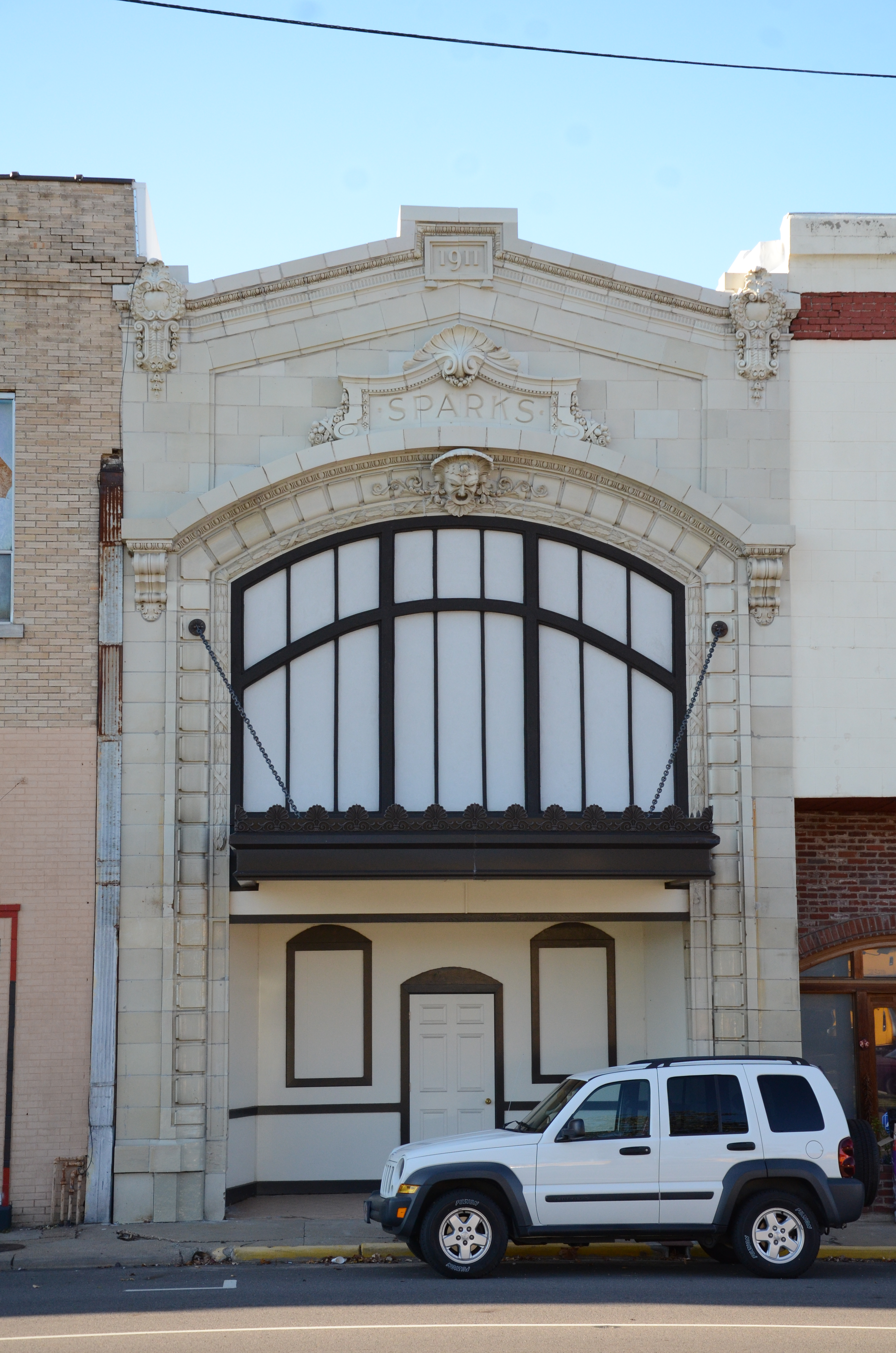

- Location within Arkansas Location within the United States
- Location: 11 N. 10th St., Fort Smith, Arkansas
- Coordinates: 35°23′7″N 94°25′18″W
- Area: less than one acre
- Built: 1911
- Built by: Boller Brothers of Kansas City
- Architect: Klaw and Erianger
- Architectural style: Beaux Arts
- NRHP reference No.: 99001351
- Added to NRHP: November 18, 1999

The New Theatre is a historic theatre building at 11 North 10th Street in Fort Smith, Arkansas. The Beaux Arts building was built in 1911, and was supposedly modeled on the New Amsterdam Theatre in New York City. The building's facade features a rich variety of decoration, including terra cotta glazed tile, terra cotta brick work, and elaborate border cartouches. The theatre began as a performing arts venue, but was converted to nearly exclusive use as a film house in the 1940s. It was closed in the 1970s, and restoration efforts have been taking place sporadically since the 1990s.

The building was listed on the National Register of Historic Places in 1999. It is vacant.

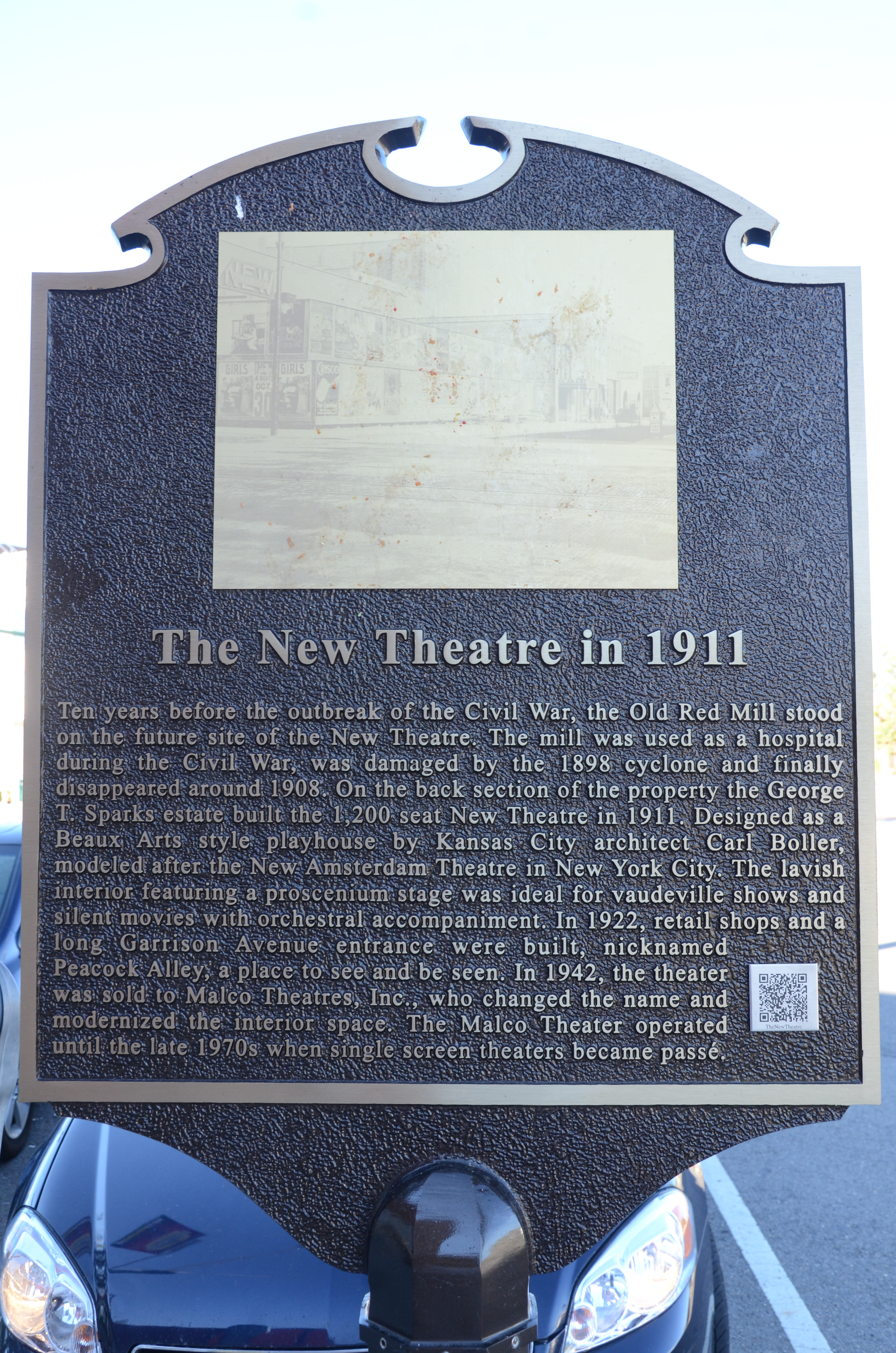
Historic marker

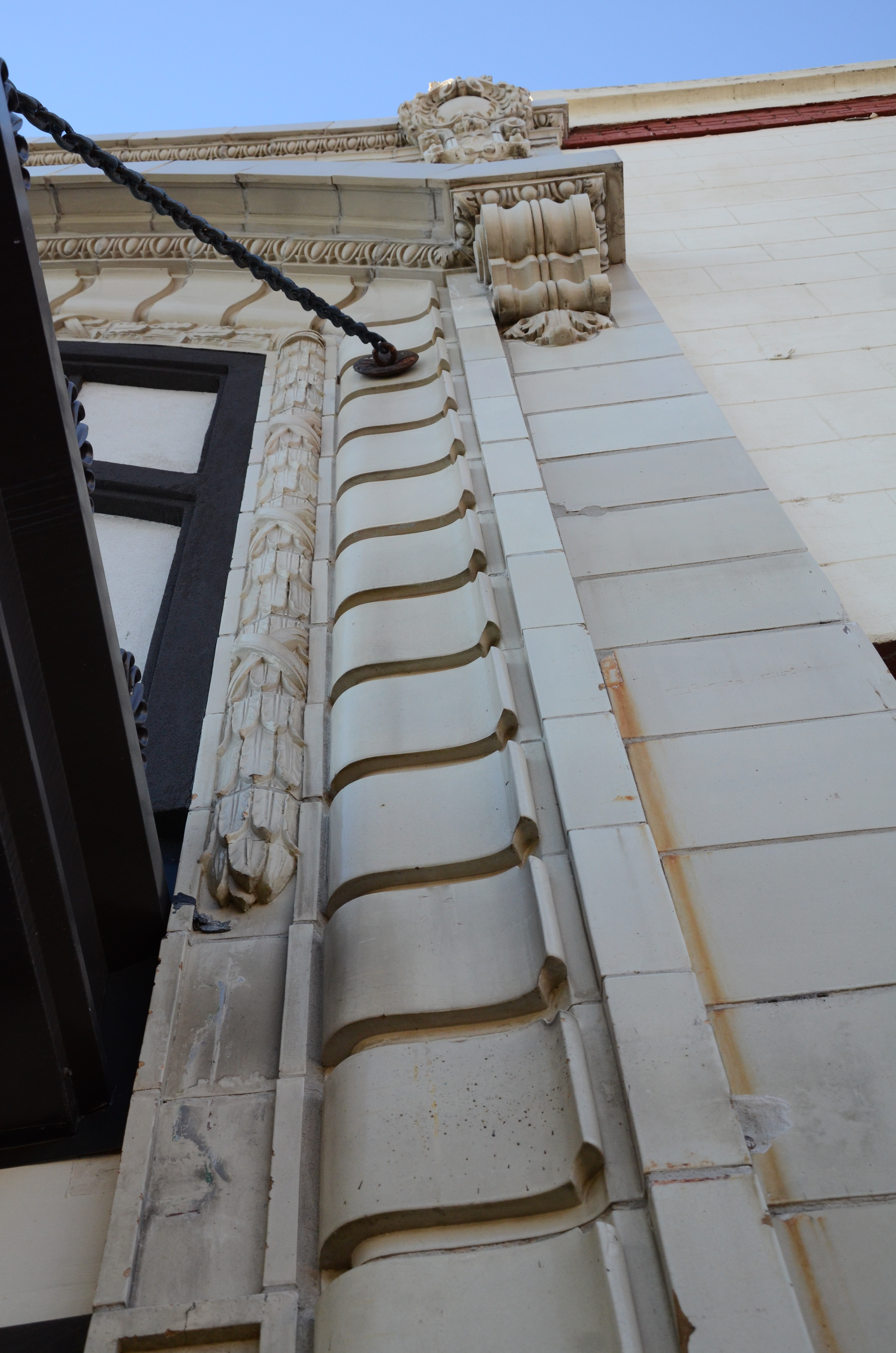
Glazed brick on facade

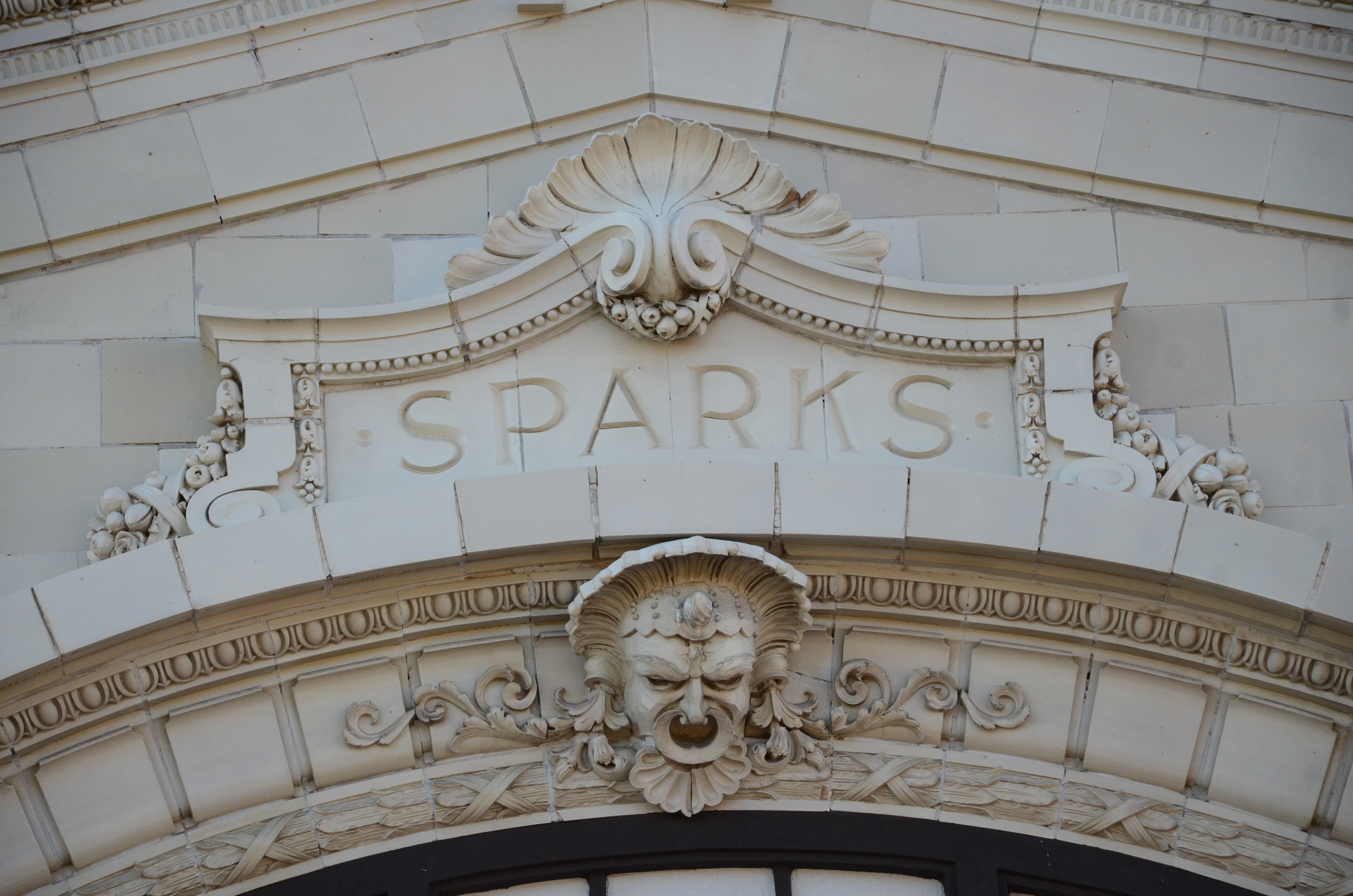
Detail over entrance

== See also ==
- National Register of Historic Places listings in Sebastian County, Arkansas
