= David Traylor Zoo of Emporia =

- Interactive map of David Traylor Zoo of Emporia
- 38.383382°N 96.177578°W
- Date opened: 1978
- Location: Emporia, Kansas
- No. of animals: 400
- No. of species: 80
- Memberships: AZA
- Owner: City of Emporia
- Website: David Traylor Zoo

The David Traylor Zoo is a small zoo located in Emporia, Kansas, United States. Admission to the zoo is free. Visitors may walk through the zoo to view the naturalized exhibits. The zoo is located in Soden's Grove Park, which includes a small train that operates in the summer, the historical Marsh Arch Bridge, and an All Veterans Memorial.

== Overview ==
The David Traylor Zoo is one of the smallest zoos in the United States that is accredited by the Association of Zoos and Aquariums (AZA). It features naturalized exhibits of native and exotic birds and animals, and is noted for its extensive landscaping.

== History ==
The David Traylor Zoo initially started in Emporia sometime in the early 1900's with a collection of a few different species being called unofficially the Emporia Zoo. In 1934 Monkey Island was established as then Mayor Frank Lostutter retrieved four rhesus monkeys from Kansas State University. Going into the 1960's Monkey Island was receiving a lot of complaints about its condition so David Traylor, at the time an accountant for the city, was offered the job as the parks director which he took in 1973. David Traylor would go to work fixing the shoddy zoo at Sodens Grove converting it from just a fence dividing animals into full exhibits for animals and for the people to come and see.

The Emporia Friends of the Zoo was founded in 1978, and provides financial support for expansion, development, and maintenance at the zoo. Funding for the Friends is primarily through membership and contributions. As the zoo continued to grow, Emporia State University got involved with the zoo, by using the resources available at the zoo in order to teach college students better and make good applicants to work at the zoo in the future.

After 30 years of work David Traylor would retire from director of the zoo in 2006, which is when the Emporia zoo got the name David Traylor Zoo. Later in 2008 Lisa Keith, whom Traylor hired in 1992, became the director the zoo and oversaw its continued growth and development until retiring in 2024 at 32 years of service. As of August 2024 Brenda Young was appointed the zoos new director. In 2019 plans were put into place to make updates to the zoo for its outdated technology and exhibits as well as updates to the parking lot, education building, guest amenities, and nature play area.

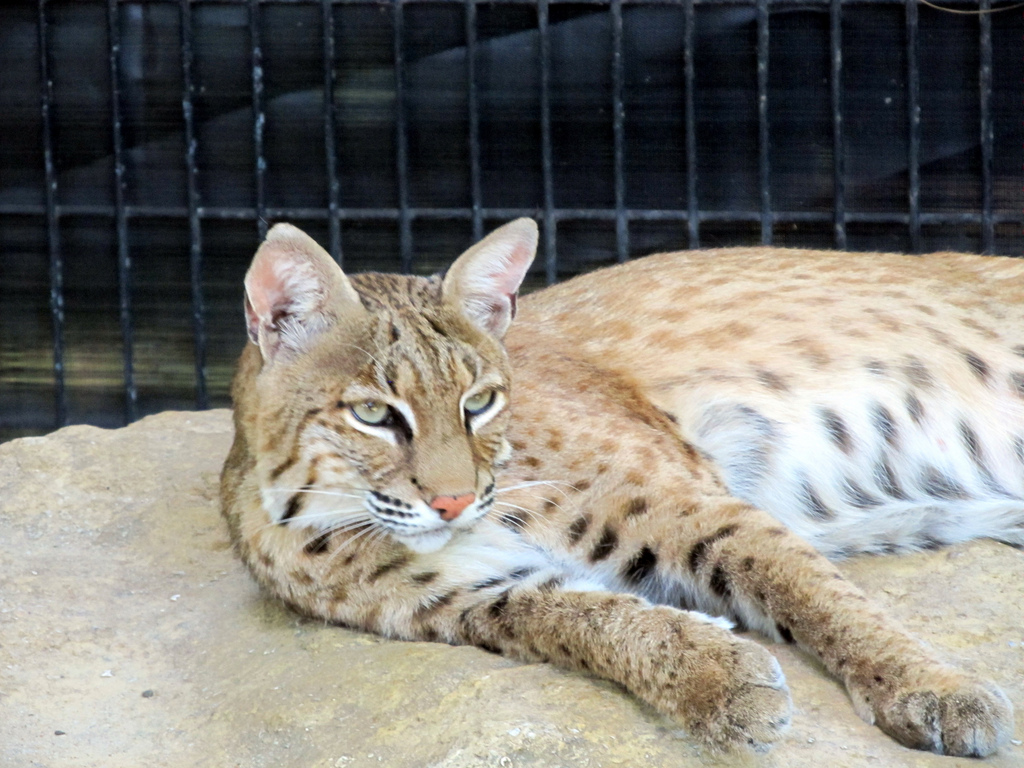
Bobcat in the David Traylor Zoo.

== Exhibits ==
The David Traylor Zoo has a multitude of different species and animals. With a selection of reptiles, arthropods, mammals, and birds, the zoo accommodates hundreds of different animals. With updates being announced in 2019, the zoo got better equipment and supplies to make the enclosures better suited to caring for the animals of the zoo by making them look more natural. Arthropods and Reptiles can all be seen at the zoo's education center building.

Animals at the zoo include ducks, prairie dog, Cinereous vultures, bison, mule deer, red foxes, cougar, and cotton-top tamarin. bobcats, bald eagles, mountain lions, otters, black swans, kookaburra, alligator snapping turtle, wallaby, trumpeter hornbill, and trumpeter swan. There have been plans to bring in more animals and exhibits for the zoo but were scrapped for making the current exhibits better and improving the zoo overall.

== Conservation ==
The David Traylor Zoo is involved with multiple different conservation efforts. One of the conservation efforts that the zoo is doing is for both energy and water. In the big pond of the zoo, it recycles the water in the pond using a waterfall effects as well as help with the oxygenation of the water. There is also a timed irrigation system to allow for night time watering aiding the water conservation. Almost everything that is used by the zoo is recycled or reused in some capacity, being proponents of recycling as well. As a part of the conservation efforts and care for animals, improvements have been going on since 2019 to improve multiple exhibits with the North American Waterfowl exhibit being completed in 2021. Updates to the zoo have been ongoing since with different exhibits being updated as it goes along.

The zoo as a part of its AZA certification is also a part of different Species Survival Plan (SSP) conservation efforts:

- Black and White Ruffed Lemur
- Cinereous Vulture
- Common Spider Tortoise
- Cotton-top Tamarin
- Crowned Lemur
- King Vulture
- Kinkajou
- Laughing Kookaburra
- Lesser Madagascar Hedgehog Tenrec
- Nene Goose
- Ring-tailed Lemur
- Sacred Ibis
- Scarlet Ibis
- Southern three-banded Armadillo
- Trumpeter Hornbill

== Community outreach ==
During the year, the zoo has various events including an annual Open House (the fourth Sunday in June), Boo in the Zoo at Halloween and Zoo Lights during the winter holiday season. The zoo also holds the Party for the Planet event for Earth day, with a plant swap, tree giveaway, and fun activities. Also the zoo puts on World Ocean Day with activities for kids to do when they visit. These are all activities and events that the zoo puts on to get the community to interact with the zoo and animals

=== Education ===
Throughout the year, the zoo holds multiple different community events for students to come to and learn about the animals of the zoo. With the education programs that the zoo holds, 30,000 students participate in the different educational events each year. During the summer, the zoo will hold a zoo camp for students who completed 3rd or 4th grade. This is a week long camp for kids to come and learn about the wild world of animals from experts at the zoo. There are also opportunities for people 16 and older to volunteer with the zoo called docents to help with the zoo and promote ecological awareness. On top of the different programs available the zoo also has a education building open Monday, Wednesday, Friday from 1pm to 4pm. In 2024 a new Education Center Building was unveiled with new and improved technology, being four times larger than the previous center there are more classrooms and an outdoor classroom for students and to see different species.
