= Dream Theater (Russell, Kansas) =

- U.S. National Register of Historic Places
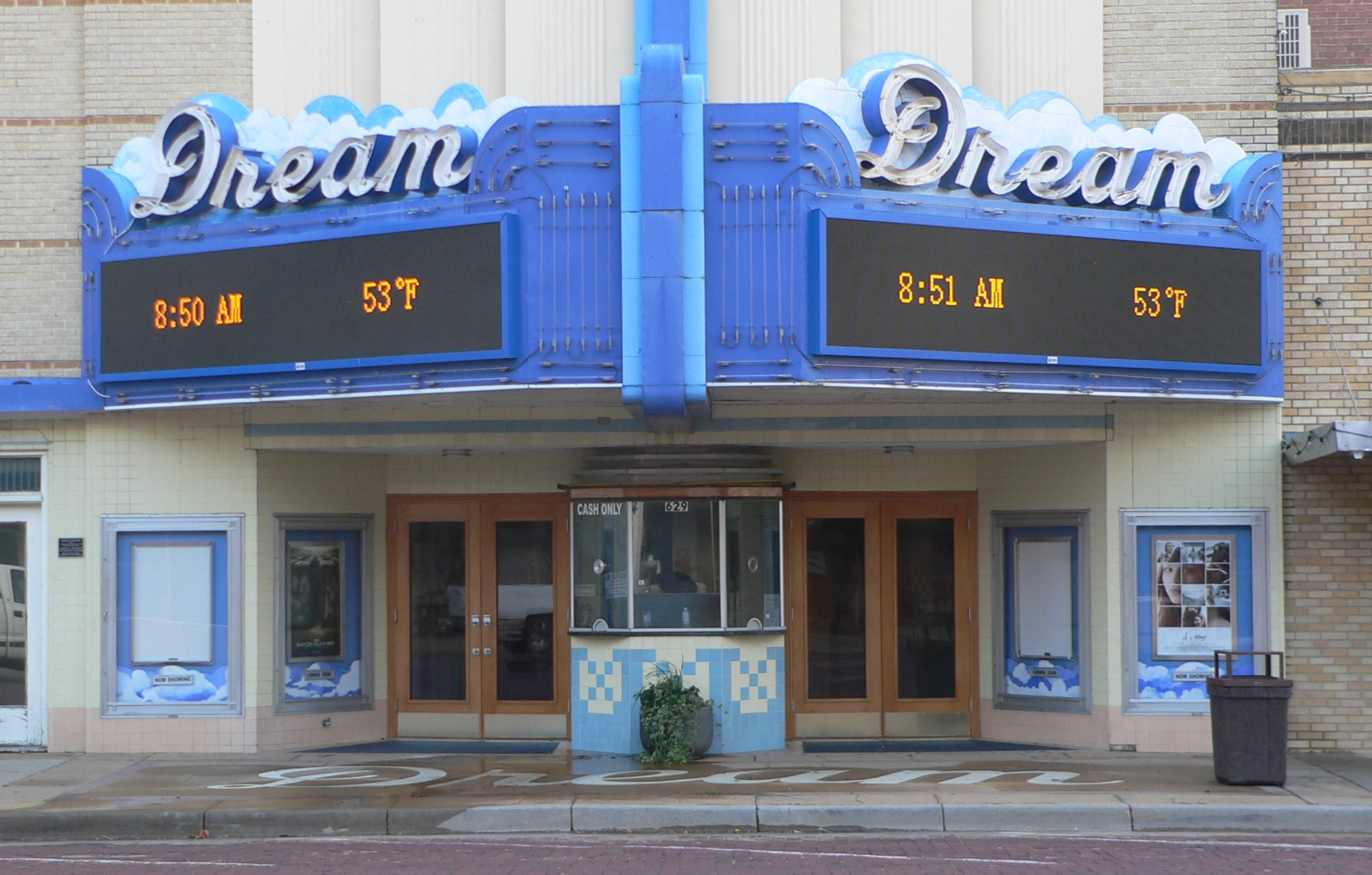
- The Dream Theater in 2014

- Location within Kansas Location within the United States
- Location: 629 N. Main St., Russell, Kansas
- Coordinates: 38°53′30″N 98°51′34″W
- Area: Less than one acre
- Built: 1948
- Architects: Boller, Robert O.; Lusk, Dietz Jr.
- Architectural style: Art Deco
- MPS: Theaters and Opera Houses of Kansas MPS
- NRHP reference No.: 06000112
- Added to NRHP: March 8, 2006

The Dream Theater, located at 629 N. Main St. in Russell, Kansas, is an Art Deco-style theater which was built in 1948. It was listed on the National Register of Historic Places in 2006.

It was built in c. 1948–49 to replace the previous Dream Theater, which had been built as the "Main Street Theater" in 1929, remodeled, and renamed in 1934. The previous theater was destroyed by fire on April 19, 1947. The new theater was designed to be "a modern, futurist, up-to-date, fireproof theater that would rival theaters in large cities."

It was designed by architects Robert O. Boller and Dietz Lusk Jr. of Kansas City, Missouri, and is a late example of the Art Deco style.
