= Fox Theatre (San Francisco) =

Former movie theater in San Francisco, California, United States

Coordinates: 37.77681°N 122.41761°W

Fox Theatre (San Francisco, California)
- Interactive map of Fox Theatre (San Francisco, California)
- Location: 1350 Market Street, San Francisco, California, USA
- Owner: William Fox
- Operator: Fox Theaters
- Seating type: Fixed
- Capacity: 4,651
- Type: movie palace

Construction
- Opened: June 28, 1929
- Closed: February 16, 1963
- Demolished: July 1963
- Architect: Thomas W. Lamb

Website
- www.historigraphics.com/fox

The Fox Theatre was a 4,651-seat movie palace located at 1350 Market Street in San Francisco, California. The theater was designed by the noted theater architect, Thomas W. Lamb. Opened in 1929, the theater operated until 1963, when it was closed and demolished.

== History ==
The Fox was built in 1929 by movie pioneer William Fox as a showcase for the films of the Fox Film Corporation along with elaborate stage shows. It was one of a group of five spectacular Fox Theatres built by Fox in the late 1920s. The others were the Fox Theatres in Brooklyn, Atlanta, Detroit, and St. Louis.

The Fox Theatre opened on June 28, 1929, with the premiere of Behind That Curtain, a Charlie Chan movie produced by William Fox, directed by Irving Cummings, and starring Warner Baxter and Lois Moran. The theater was closed from October 20, 1932, to April 1, 1933, due to financial difficulties. On June 28, 1959, a 30th anniversary celebration took place with the screening of the 20th Century-Fox film Say One for Me with Bing Crosby and Debbie Reynolds. On March 5, 1960, a series of organ concerts on Saturdays at midnight began, in an attempt to increase business and keep the theater open.

== Closing and demolition ==
Declining attendance and revenue had been an issue for the Fox since the end of World War II, but had become more pronounced by the late 1950s, with the expansion of television in that decade. The question of the City & County of San Francisco buying the Fox and its land was put before the voters on November 7, 1961, as Proposition I. Requiring only a simple majority, the measure was overwhelmingly defeated with a NO vote of 59.2%.

On February 16, 1963, the theater closed after the Farewell to the Fox benefit concert featuring Hollywood actors and theater performers such as Jane Russell and Tiny James. Longtime Fox Theater performer Everett Forbes Nourse was the last organist to play at the theater during the concert. The concert was released in two parts on vinyl records and later on compact disc. The theater was demolished in July 1963.

Now located at the site is Fox Plaza at 1390 Market Street, a high-rise building with offices and apartments (no relation to the famous Fox Plaza in Los Angeles). The Fox Special Wurlitzer organ was salvaged from the theater and installed in the Frank J. Lanterman estate in La Cañada Flintridge, California. Upon Lanterman's passing, the large 4-manual 36-rank organ was bought by the Disney Company and installed in the restored El Capitan Theatre in Hollywood, California.

== See also ==
- Fox Theatre
