= Blue Fox Theatre =

- U.S. National Register of Historic Places
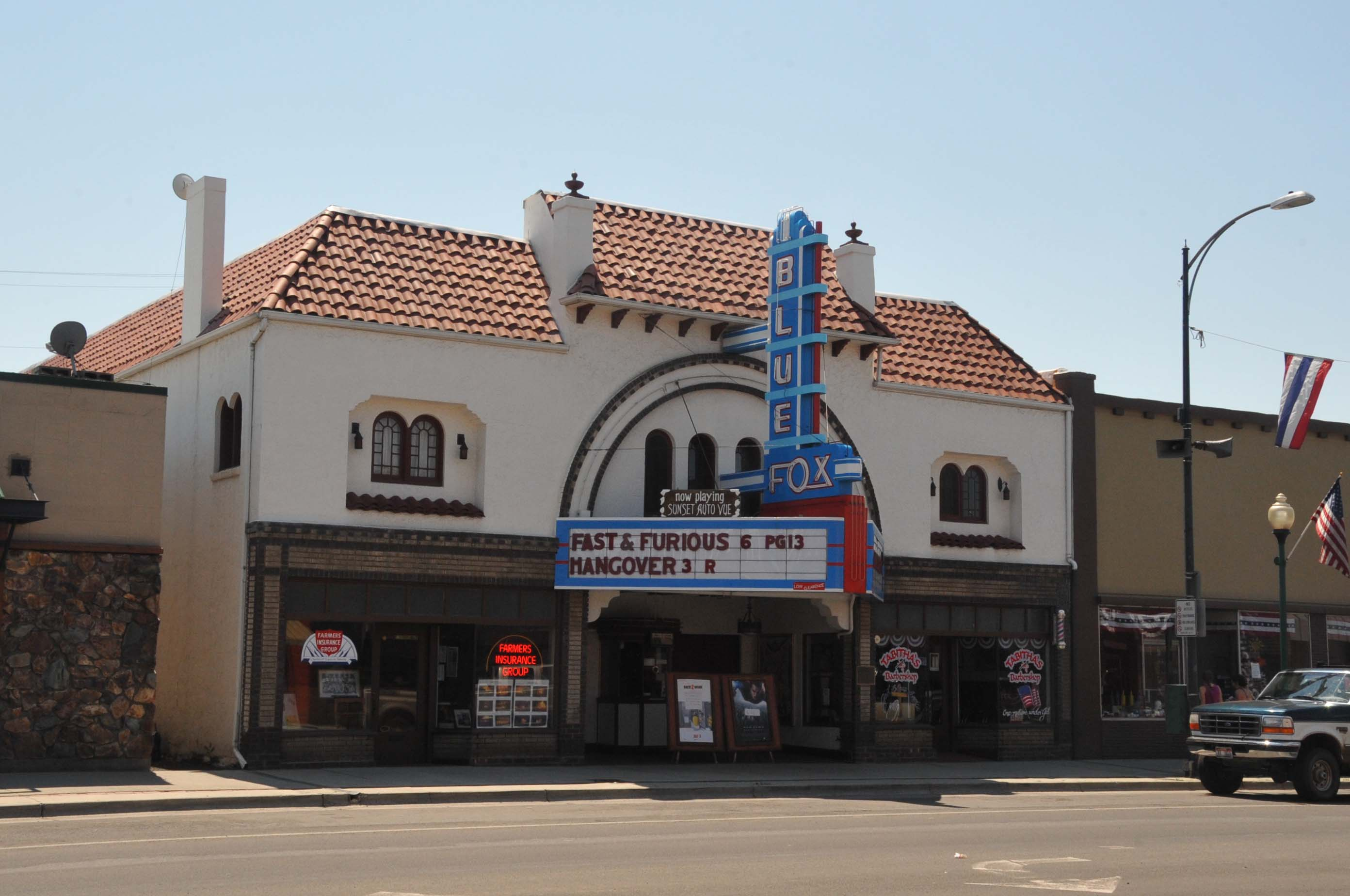

- Location within Idaho Location within the United States
- Location: 116 W. Main St., Grangeville, Idaho
- Coordinates: 45°55′32″N 116°7′9″W
- Area: less than one acre
- Built: 1929–1930
- Architect: Adkinson, J.R.
- Architectural style: Mission Revival
- MPS: Motion Picture Theater Buildings in Idaho MPS
- NRHP reference No.: 99001412
- Added to NRHP: November 30, 1999

The Blue Fox Theatre is a historic cinema located at 116 W. Main Street in Grangeville, Idaho. The Mission Revival theater was built in 1929 and opened on May 2, 1930. The theater took its name from J.H. Dickson's entry into a naming contest; Dickson received $10 and three movie tickets as a reward. In addition to showing films, the theater also hosted live productions during its initial years of operation. The theater's neon-lit marquee was added in 1940. After a fire damaged much of the building's interior in 1942, the theater closed while its interior was completely reconstructed; it reopened in 1945. The theater continues to show films and is still owned by the Wagner family, which has owned the building since the 1930s.

The theater was added to the National Register of Historic Places on November 30, 1999.
