= Fox–Watson Theater Building =

Historical theater

Stiefel Theatre
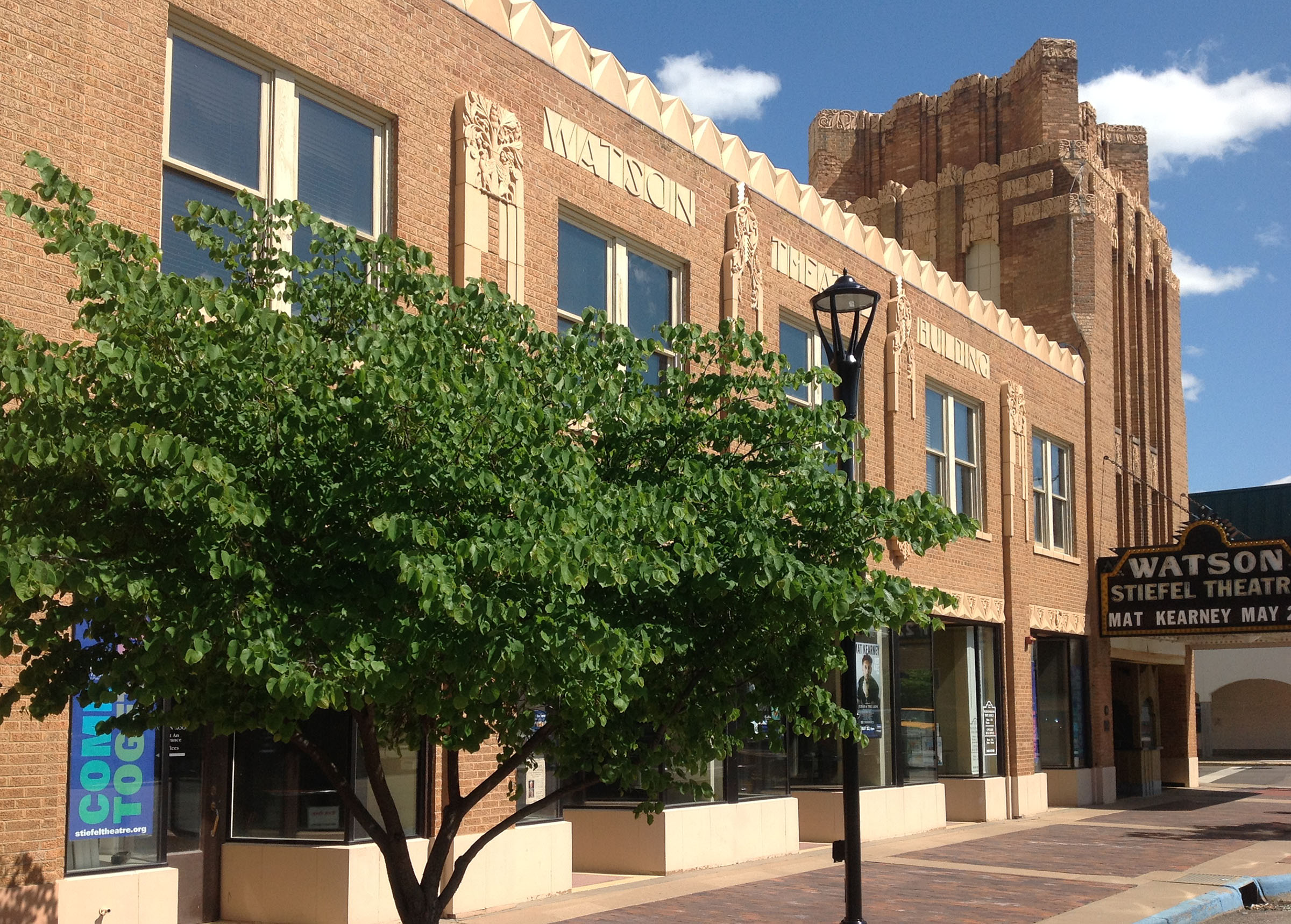
- Side exterior c. 2015
- Interactive map of Stiefel Theatre
- Full name: Stiefel Theatre for the Performing Arts
- Former names: Fox–Watson Theater (1931–1987)
- Address: 151 S Santa Fe Ave; Salina, KS 67401-2809
- Location: Downtown Salina
- Coordinates: 38.838677°N 97.608928°W
- Owner: City of Salina
- Capacity: 1,265

Construction
- Opened: February 23, 1931; 95 years ago
- Renovated: 1997–2003
- Cost: US$400,000
- Architect: Boller Brothers
- Builder: Fox West Coast Theatres

Website
- Official website
- Fox–Watson Theater Building
- U.S. National Register of Historic Places
- Architectural style: Art Deco
- NRHP reference No.: 88001171
- Added to NRHP: August 4, 1988

The Fox–Watson Theater was opened in 1931 as a movie theater in Salina, Kansas. It was listed on the National Register of Historic Places in 1988 as the "Fox–Watson Theater Building". It was turned non-profit, and was restored and renamed in 2003 as Stiefel Theatre, a performing arts venue.

== History ==
The Fox–Watson Theater was opened on February 23, 1931, by Winfield W. Watson, a local businessman and banker who led the campaign and donated the land to bring a movie house to Salina. Fox West Coast Theatres built the Art Deco movie house at a cost of $400,000 (equivalent to $7,500,000 in 2025). Boller Brothers, an architectural firm from Kansas City, Missouri, designed the structure, which features Spanish Colonial influences in its terracotta facade and interior plasterwork. The opening night feature was the Western film Not Exactly Gentlemen, starring Fay Wray.

The theater operated as a first-run movie house for decades. By the 1980s, then-owners Dickinson Theatres operated it as a discount theater until closing it in August 1987, citing competition from the company's own mall-based cinemas. Dickinson gave the theater to the city in 1989.

A non-profit group spent several years and US$3.2 million on renovation, and reopened it as the Stiefel Theatre for the Performing Arts on March 8, 2003. Its mission is to "enrich, educate, and entertain", and the programming goal is to "offer a broad base of quality entertainment in a variety of genres that will appeal to a large demographic". It houses the Salina Symphony.

The Salina Symphony performs its subscription concerts at the theater.
