= List of Art Deco architecture in Kansas =

This is a list of buildings that are examples of the Art Deco architectural style in Kansas, United States.

== Abilene ==
- 203 North Buckeye, Abilene, 1930
- Abilene Swimming Pool, Abilene, 1937
- Garfield School, Abilene, 1942
- Hotel Sunflower, Abilene, 1925
- Sunflower Building, Abilene, 1931

== Arkansas City ==
- AC Office Building, Arkansas City, 1929
- First Intermark (former Newman's Department Store), Arkansas City, 1917
- Holt Motor Company (former Arkansas City Motor Company, R&K Motor Company), Arkansas City, 1911

== El Dorado ==
- 101 Main Street, El Dorado, 1930
- El Dorado Middle School, El Dorado, 1930s
- USD 490 District Performing Arts Center, El Dorado, 1937

== Emporia ==
- 520 North Commercial, Emporia, 1932
- 624 North Commercial, Emporia, 1910
- 701 North Commercial, Emporia, 1925

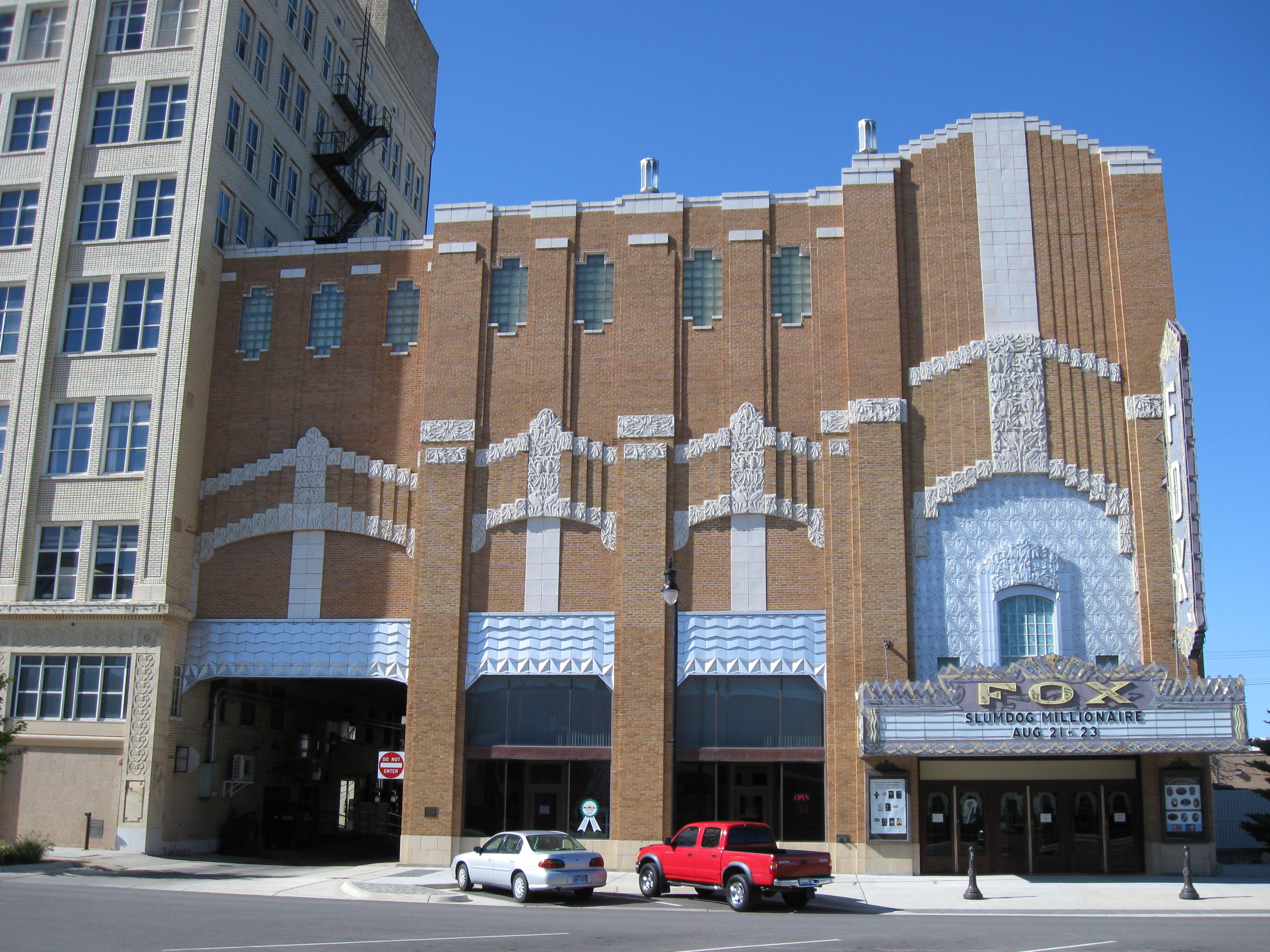
Fox Theater, Hutchinson

== Hutchinson ==
- Catalyst Lofts & Extended Stay, Hutchinson, 1927
- Fox Theater, Hutchinson, 1931
- Hutchinson Fire Station No. 1, Hutchinson, 1935
- Lyons Middle School, Hutchinson, 1930
- Reno County Courthouse, Hutchinson, 1930
- S. H. Kress and Co. Building, Hutchinson, 1933
- Strand Theatre, Hutchinson, 1913
- United States Post Office, Hutchinson, 1942

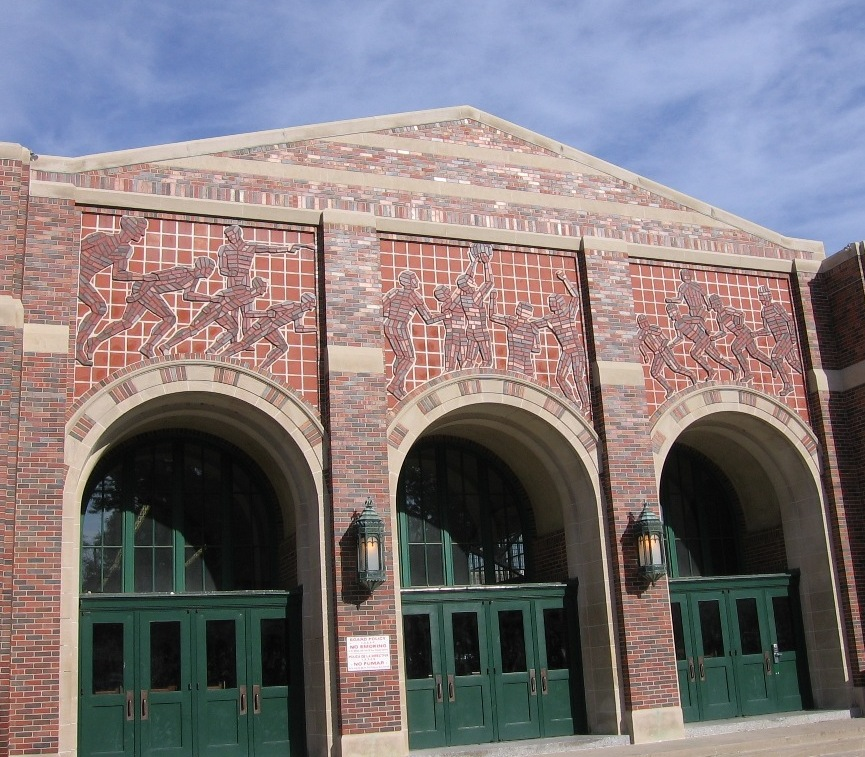
Wyandotte High School, Kansas City

== Kansas City ==
- 1327, Minnesota Avenue Kansas City, 1931 and 1945
- 1401 Minnesota Avenue (former dairy), Kansas City, 1931 and 1945
- 1830 Minnesota Avenue, Kansas City, 1931 and 1945
- AT&T Building, 948 North 10th Street, Kansas City, 1938
- Boulevard at the Med Center Apartments, Kansas City, 1938
- Kansas City Kansan Building, Kansas City, 1928
- Kansas State School for the Blind, Kansas City, 1937
- Kaw Valley State Bank, Kansas City
- Kellogg's Snacks Plant, Kansas City
- Parker School, Kansas City, 1938
- Sumner Academy of Arts & Science, Kansas City, 1937
- Vernon School, Kansas City, 1936
- Washington High School, Kansas City, 1932
- Wyandotte High School, Kansas City, 1936

== Olathe ==
- New Century AirCenter Administration Building, Olathe, 1942
- New Century AirCenter Air Station Garage, Olathe, 1942
- New Century AirCenter Mechanics Garage, Olathe, 1942
- New Century AirCenter Power Station, Olathe, 1942

== Salina ==
- 107 North Santa Fe Avenue, Salina
- 109–111 North Santa Fe Avenue, Salina
- 129 North Santa Fe Avenue, Salina
- 131 North Santa Fe Avenue, Salina
- 135 North Santa Fe Avenue, Salina
- 145 North Santa Fe Avenue, Salina
- 234 North Santa Fe Avenue, Salina
- 243 North Santa Fe Avenue, Salina
- Cork Building (now Extraordinary Events), Salina
- Fox–Watson Theater Building, Salina, 1931
- Municipal Waterworks, Salina, 1934
- United Building, Salina, 1930
- Vogue Theatre (former Limon–Bell Tire Company), Salina, 1928

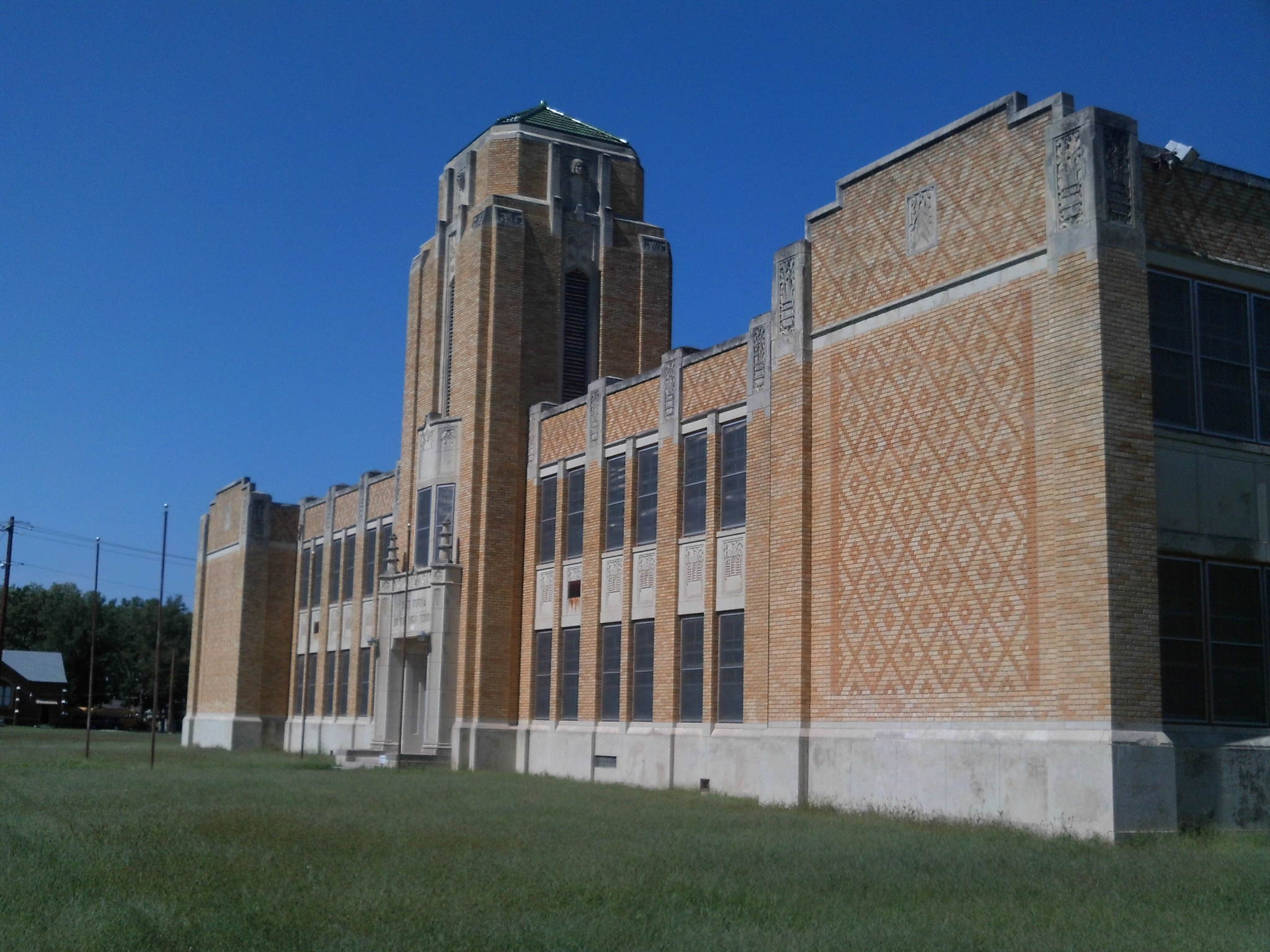
East Topeka Junior High, Topeka

== Topeka ==
- 305 Southeast 17th, Topeka, 1940
- 1802 Northwest Topeka Boulevard, Topeka, 1939
- Agriculture Hall, Kansas State Fairgrounds, Topeka
- American Legion Post 400, Topeka, 1930
- Coca-Cola Bottling Company, Topeka, 1940
- East Topeka Junior High School, Topeka, 1935
- Iron Rail Brewing (former W.T. Grant Building), Topeka, 1935
- Kansas Department of Transportation District 1 Building, Topeka, 1935
- Kaw Valley State Bank, Topeka, 1935
- Santa Fe Hospital, Topeka, 1930
- Sumner Elementary School, Topeka, 1936
- Topeka Performing Arts Center, Topeka, 1939
- Topeka Water Pollution Control Waste Water Treatment Plant, Topeka, 1929

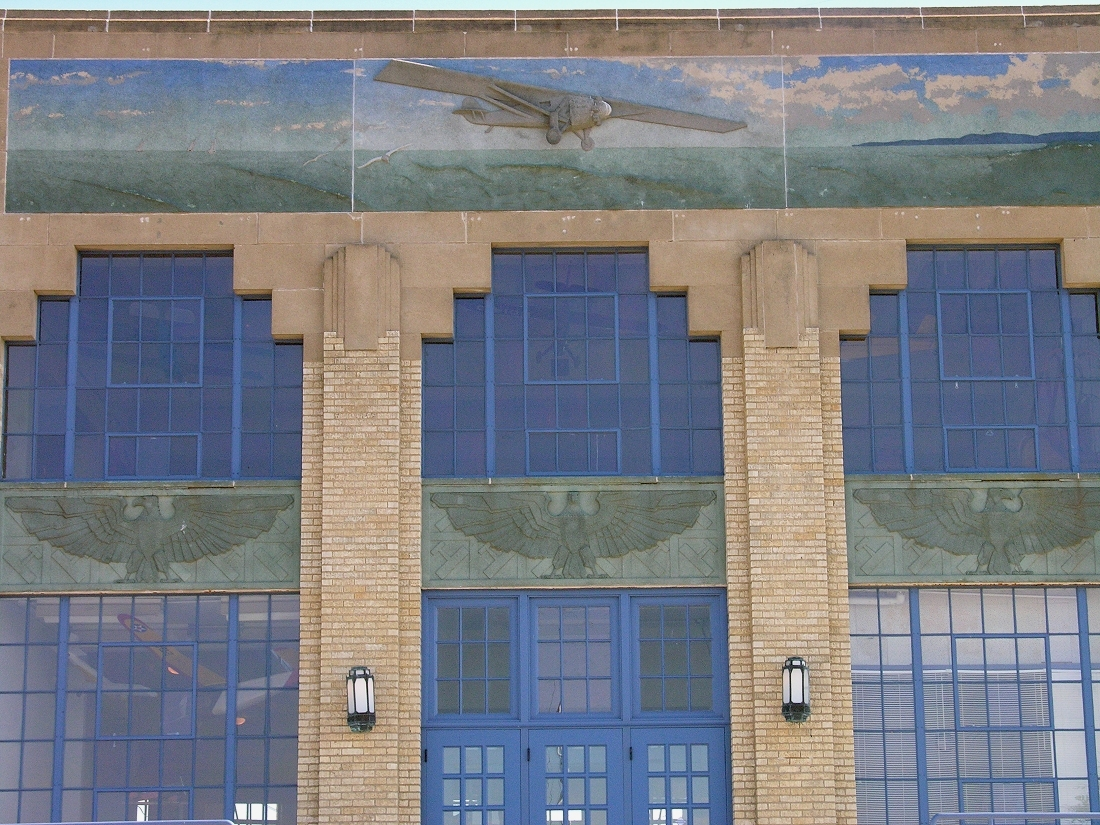
Kansas Aviation Museum, Wichita

== Wichita ==
- Adeline Apartment Building, Wichita, 1923
- Allen's Market, Wichita, 1930
- Dunbar Theatre, Wichita, 1941
- Griffin Architectural Office Building, Wichita, 1940
- Helzburg Building, 219 East Douglas, Wichita, 1948
- Hiland Dairy, Wichita, 1945
- John Marshall Middle School, Wichita, 1939
- Johnson Drug Store Building, Wichita, 1930
- Johnson–Cohlmia Building, Wichita, 1930
- Kansas Aviation Museum, Wichita, 1935
- Kellogg Elementary School, Wichita, 1935
- Longfellow Elementary School, Wichita, 1930
- Marquee Motorcars, Wichita, 1930
- Minisa Bridge, Wichita, 1932
- North Riverside Park Comfort Station, Wichita, 1934
- Petroleum Building, Wichita, 1929
- Robinson Middle School, Wichita, 1931
- Sedgwick County EMS County Employee Association, Wichita, 1941
- Steffen Ice and Ice Cream Co. (now Hiland-Steffen Dairy Foods), Wichita, 1931
- United States Post Office and Federal Building, Wichita, 1936
- Walter S. Henrion House, Wichita, 1929
- Wichita North High School, Wichita, 192

== Other cities ==
- American Legion Hall, Wellington, 1938
- Anthony Municipal Hall, Anthony, 1935
- Anthony Theater, Anthony, 1936
- Augusta Theater, Augusta, 1935
- Beloit Municipal Building, Beloit, 1897, 1917
- Besse Apartments (former Hotel Besse), Pittsburg, 1927
- Burlington Opry (former Plaza Theatre), Burlington, 1925 and 1940
- Clay Center Municipal Band Shell, Clay Center, 1933
- Colby City Hall, Colby, 1936
- Communitea, Overland Park, 1945
- Cottonwood Falls Municipal Building, Cottonwood Falls, 1938
- Crest Theatre, Great Bend, 1950
- Decatur Community High School, Oberlin, 1930s
- Dighton High School, Dighton, 1936
- Dream Theater, Russell, 1929 and 1949
- Earl H. Ellis VFW Post No. 1362, Pratt, 1939
- Eugene Ware Elementary School, Fort Scott, 1935
- First National Bank, Herrington, 1930
- Fowler Swimming Pool and Bathhouse, Fowler, 1936
- Grant County Courthouse District, Ulysses, 1929
- Greeley County High School, Tribune, 1941
- Gregg Theatre, 116 South Chautauqua Street, Sedan, 1938
- Hiawatha National Guard Armory, Hiawatha, 1938
- High School Gymnasium, Elk Falls, 1920
- Hollywood Theater, Leavenworth, 1937
- Hoisington High School, Hoisington, 1940
- Hotel Roberts, Pratt, 1930
- Howard T. Sawhill City Park Bandshell, St. Francis, 1934
- Ice Plant, Downtown Wellington Historic District, Wellington, 1935
- Jewell County Courthouse, Mankato, 1937
- Junction City Fire Department (former Municipal Building), Junction City, 1936
- Labette County High School, Altamont, 1940
- Lane County Community High School, Dighton, 1938
- Lincoln Elementary School, Clay Center, 1939
- Lincoln School, District 2, Ellwood, 1935
- Marysville High School and Junior High Complex, Marysville, 1937
- Masonic Hall, Hays, 1947
- McDaniel Education Resource Center, Bonner Springs, 1935
- McKague Memorial Masonic Temple, Oberlin, 1932
- Municipal Building, Edna, 1939
- NLC Elementary (former Americus High School), Americus, 1941
- Nova Theatre, Stockton, 1933
- Norcatur City Hall, Norcatur, 1937
- Overland Theatre (former Rio Theatre), Overland Park, 1925
- Paradise Water Tower, Paradise, 1938
- Parsons Public Swimming Pool, Parsons, 1935
- Power Plant No. 1, McPherson, 1934
- Republic County Courthouse, Belleville, 1939
- Ruleton School, Ruleton, 1928
- St. Benedict's Abbey, Atchinson, 1957
- St. Francis Community High School, St. Francis
- Scott City High School, Scott City, 1930
- Telephone Building, Goodland, 1931
- Thomas County Insurance (former Telephone Building), Colby
- United States. Post Office (former high school), Englewood, 1940
- United States Post Office, Sabetha, 1937
- United Telephone Building, Goodland, 1931
- Wabaunsee County Courthouse, Alma, 1932
- Wakefield High School, Wakefield, 1949
- Warshaw Building, Dodge City, 1915 and 1930
- Washington City Hall, Washington, 1934
- Washington County Courthouse, Washington, 1934

== See also ==
- List of Art Deco architecture
- List of Art Deco architecture in the United States
