= National Register of Historic Places listings in Russell County, Kansas =

Location of Russell County in Kansas

This is a list of the National Register of Historic Places listings in Russell County, Kansas.

This is intended to be a complete list of the properties on the National Register of Historic Places in Russell County, Kansas, United States. The locations of National Register properties for which the latitude and longitude coordinates are included below, may be seen in a map.

There are 24 properties listed on the National Register in the county.

This National Park Service list is complete through NPS recent listings posted September 4, 2026.

== Current listings ==
	Name on the Register	Image	Date listed	Location	City or town	Description
1	Archeological Site Number 14RU5		July 9, 1982 (#82004867)	Address restricted	Russell	
2	Archeological Site Number 14RU10		July 9, 1982 (#82004868)	Address restricted	Dorrance	
3	Archeological Site Number 14RU313		July 9, 1982 (#82004869)	Address restricted	Russell	
4	Archeological Site Number 14RU314		July 9, 1982 (#82004870)	Address restricted	Paradise	
5	Archeological Site Number 14RU315		July 9, 1982 (#82004871)	Address restricted	Bunker Hill	
6	Archeological Site Number 14RU316		July 9, 1982 (#82004872)	Address restricted	Dorrance	
7	Archeological Site Number 14RU324		July 9, 1982 (#82004873)	Address restricted	Russell	
8	Banks-Waudby Building	Banks-Waudby Building	December 27, 2006 (#06001172)	719 N. Main St. 38°53′33″N 98°51′34″W	Russell	
9	Deeble Rock Garden	Deeble Rock Garden	October 4, 2017 (#100001705)	126 Fairview Ave. 39°03′31″N 98°32′11″W	Lucas	
10	Dorrance State Bank	Dorrance State Bank	August 4, 2011 (#11000507)	512 Main St. 38°50′45″N 98°35′20″W	Dorrance	
11	Dream Theater	Dream Theater	March 8, 2006 (#06000112)	629 N. Main St. 38°53′30″N 98°51′34″W	Russell	
12	First National Bank-Waudby Building	First National Bank-Waudby Building	December 27, 2006 (#06001174)	713 N. Main St. 38°53′33″N 98°51′34″W	Russell	
13	Garden of Eden	Garden of Eden	April 28, 1977 (#77000595)	2nd and Kansas Ave. 39°03′33″N 98°32′04″W	Lucas	
14	Nicholas Gernon House	Nicholas Gernon House	October 19, 2022 (#100008291)	818 North Kansas St. 38°53′37″N 98°51′31″W	Russell	
15	House at 202 West 3rd Street	House at 202 West 3rd Street	March 27, 2023 (#100008786)	202 West 3rd St. 39°06′52″N 98°41′40″W	Luray	
16	Kennedy Hotel	Kennedy Hotel	January 17, 2007 (#06001244)	117 Third St. 39°06′51″N 98°55′00″W	Paradise	
17	Lucas School Gymnasium	Lucas School Gymnasium	October 17, 2022 (#100008290)	130 North Greely Ave. 39°03′39″N 98°32′02″W	Lucas	
18	Mann House	Mann House	March 2, 2001 (#01000190)	614 Oakdale; 38°53′04″N 98°51′08″W	Russell	1949 Lustron dwelling with a Westchester Deluxe Plan.
19	Paradise Water Tower	Paradise Water Tower	January 17, 2007 (#06001242)	East of intersection of Waldo and Main Sts. 39°07′05″N 98°54′56″W	Paradise	
20	Pospishil Building	Pospishil Building	April 8, 2025 (#100011683)	101-103 Main Street; 39°06′44″N 98°41′31″W	Luray	
21	Reiff Building	Reiff Building	March 15, 2007 (#07000140)	513 Main St. 38°50′45″N 98°35′22″W	Dorrance	
22	Russell County Jail and Sheriff's Residence	Russell County Jail and Sheriff's Residence	February 3, 2012 (#11001080)	331 N. Kansas St. 38°53′20″N 98°51′30″W	Russell	
23	US Post Office-Russell	US Post Office-Russell	October 17, 1989 (#89001649)	135 W. Sixth St. 38°53′29″N 98°51′39″W	Russell	
24	Woelk House	Woelk House	March 2, 2001 (#01000191)	615 Sunset; 38°53′02″N 98°51′07″W	Russell	1949 Lustron dwelling with a Westchester Deluxe Plan.

== See also ==
- List of National Historic Landmarks in Kansas
- National Register of Historic Places listings in Kansas
