= Samuel Dinsmoor (disambiguation) =

Samuel Dinsmore may refer to:

- Samuel Dinsmoor (1766–1835), American politician, U.S. Congressman and Governor of New Hampshire
- Samuel Dinsmoor Jr. (1799–1869), American banker, Governor of New Hampshire
- Samuel P. Dinsmoor (1843–1932), eccentric American sculptor and landscape designer
