= Lucas, Kansas =

City in Russell County, Kansas

- City
- Location within Russell County and Kansas

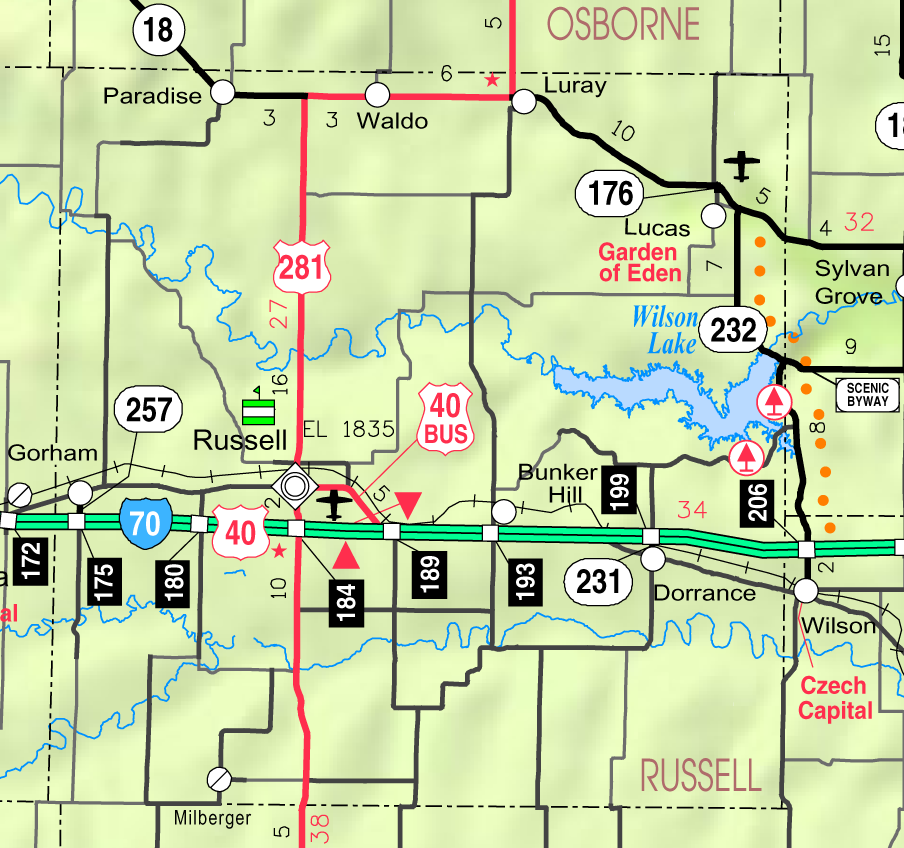
- KDOT map of Russell County (legend)
- Coordinates: 39°3′22″N 98°32′11″W
- Country: United States
- State: Kansas
- County: Russell
- Founded: 1877
- Incorporated: 1899
- Named for: Lucas Place

Government
  - Type: Mayor–Council
  - Mayor: Trent Leach

Area
  - Total: 0.61 sq mi (1.58 km^{2})
  - Land: 0.61 sq mi (1.58 km^{2})
  - Water: 0 sq mi (0.00 km^{2})
- Elevation: 1,493 ft (455 m)

Population (2020)
  - Total: 332
  - Density: 544/sq mi (210/km^{2})
- Time zone: UTC-6 (CST)
  - Summer (DST): UTC-5 (CDT)
- ZIP Code: 67648
- Area code: 785
- FIPS code: 20-43150
- GNIS ID: 472535
- Website: cityoflucasks.com

Lucas is a city in Russell County, Kansas, United States. As of the 2020 census, the population of the city was 332.

== History ==
Lucas was established as the community of Blue Stem in 1877. It was renamed Lucas in 1887 after Lucas Place in St. Louis, Missouri.

== Geography ==
Lucas is located in north-central Kansas at the junction of Kansas Highway 18 (K-18) and Kansas Highway 232 (K-232), Lucas is 115 miles (185 km) northwest of Wichita, 212 miles (341 km) west of Kansas City, and 21 miles (34 km) northeast of Russell, the county seat.

Lucas lies in the Smoky Hills region of the Great Plains, approximately 8 miles (13 km) north of Wilson Lake. Wolf Creek, a tributary of the Saline River, flows east along the southern edge of the city.

According to the United States Census Bureau, the city has a total area of 0.60 square miles (1.55 km^{2}), all land.

=== Climate ===
The climate in this area is characterized by hot, humid summers and generally mild to cool winters. According to the Köppen Climate Classification system, Lucas has a humid subtropical climate, abbreviated "Cfa" on climate maps.

== Demographics ==
Historical population
Census	Pop.	Note	%±
1900	277		—
1910	573		106.9%
1920	651		13.6%
1930	630		−3.2%
1940	648		2.9%
1950	631		−2.6%
1960	559		−11.4%
1970	524		−6.3%
1980	524		0.0%
1990	452		−13.7%
2000	436		−3.5%
2010	393		−9.9%
2020	332		−15.5%
U.S. Decennial Census

=== 2020 census ===
The 2020 United States census counted 332 people, 171 households, and 95 families in Lucas. The population density was 546.1 per square mile (210.8/km^{2}). There were 239 housing units at an average density of 393.1 per square mile (151.8/km^{2}). The racial makeup was 90.36% (300) white or European American (87.35% non-Hispanic white), 0.0% (0) black or African-American, 0.0% (0) Native American or Alaska Native, 0.3% (1) Asian, 0.0% (0) Pacific Islander or Native Hawaiian, 2.41% (8) from other races, and 6.93% (23) from two or more races. Hispanic or Latino of any race was 4.52% (15) of the population.

Of the 171 households, 24.0% had children under the age of 18; 42.7% were married couples living together; 25.1% had a female householder with no spouse or partner present. 38.6% of households consisted of individuals and 21.6% had someone living alone who was 65 years of age or older. The average household size was 1.9 and the average family size was 2.4. The percent of those with a bachelor's degree or higher was estimated to be 21.4% of the population.

22.6% of the population was under the age of 18, 3.3% from 18 to 24, 17.2% from 25 to 44, 28.6% from 45 to 64, and 28.3% who were 65 years of age or older. The median age was 49.4 years. For every 100 females, there were 97.6 males. For every 100 females ages 18 and older, there were 102.4 males.

The 2016–2020 5-year American Community Survey estimates show that the median household income was $38,750 (with a margin of error of +/- $10,142) and the median family income was $50,625 (+/- $29,172). Males had a median income of $32,000 (+/- $4,578) versus $17,000 (+/- $5,343) for females. The median income for those above 16 years old was $30,234 (+/- $14,546). Approximately, 9.9% of families and 10.6% of the population were below the poverty line, including 6.7% of those under the age of 18 and 6.3% of those ages 65 or over.

=== 2010 census ===
As of the 2010 census, there were 393 people, 192 households, and 108 families residing in the city. The population density was 786 inhabitants per square mile (303/km^{2}). There were 257 housing units at an average density of 514 per square mile (198/km^{2}). The racial makeup of the city was 97.7% White, 0.8% Asian, 0.3% American Indian, 0.8% from some other race, and 0.5% from two or more races. Hispanics and Latinos of any race were 1.5% of the population.

There were 192 households, of which 22.4% had children under the age of 18 living with them, 47.9% were married couples living together, 2.1% had a male householder with no wife present, 6.3% had a female householder with no husband present, and 43.8% were non-families. 42.2% of all households were made up of individuals, and 20.3% had someone living alone who was 65 years of age or older. The average household size was 2.05, and the average family size was 2.79.

In the city, the population was spread out, with 21.1% under the age of 18, 5.6% from 18 to 24, 17.3% from 25 to 44, 29.8% from 45 to 64, and 26.2% who were 65 years of age or older. The median age was 49.5 years. For every 100 females, there were 88.0 males. For every 100 females age 18 and over, there were 82.4 males age 18 and over.

The median income for a household in the city was $30,368, and the median income for a family was $45,156. Males had a median income of $31,250 versus $23,333 for females. The per capita income for the city was $19,025. 6.7% of families and 14.6% of the population were below the poverty line, including 21.4% of those under age 18 and 16.3% of those age 65 or over.

== Economy ==
As of 2012, 56.7% of the population over the age of 16 was in the labor force. 0.0% was in the armed forces, and 56.7% was in the civilian labor force with 55.6% being employed and 1.2% unemployed. The composition, by occupation, of the employed civilian labor force was: 33.2% in sales and office occupations; 21.7% in management, business, science, and arts; 21.3% in production, transportation, and material moving; 13.6% in natural resources, construction, and maintenance; and 10.2% in service occupations. The three industries employing the largest percentages of the working civilian labor force were: educational services, and health care and social assistance (25.1%); manufacturing (21.3%); and retail trade (20.4%).

The cost of living in Lucas is relatively low; compared to a U.S. average of 100, the cost of living index for the community is 78.8. As of 2012, the median home value in the city was $56,000, the median selected monthly owner cost was $846 for housing units with a mortgage and $343 for those without, and the median gross rent was $419.

A Great Plains Manufacturing Land Pride manufacturing facility is located in Lucas.

== Government ==
Lucas is a city of the third class with a mayor-council form of government. The city council consists of five members, and it meets on the second Tuesday of each month.

Lucas lies within Kansas's 1st U.S. Congressional District. For the purposes of representation in the Kansas Legislature, the city is located in the 36th district of the Kansas Senate and the 109th district of the Kansas House of Representatives.

== Education ==
The community is served by Sylvan–Lucas USD 299 public school district. Prior to 2010, it was served by Russell County USD 407.

Lucas High School served the community until 1977. Lucas and Luray schools then united forming Lucas-Luray schools. In 2010, Lucas-Luray was united with Sylvan Unified schools to form Sylvan-Lucas Unified. The district operates one school in the city: Lucas-Sylvan Unified Elementary School (Grades K-6). Local students in Grades 7-12 attend school in Sylvan Grove.

The Lucas High School mascot was Lucas Demons. Lucas-Luray High School mascot was Lucas-Luray Cougars. Sylvan-Lucas is the Mustangs.

== Infrastructure ==
=== Transportation ===
K-18, an east–west route, approaches Lucas from the west, then turns southeast along the eastern side of the city. K-232, also known as the Post Rock Scenic Byway, a north–south route, terminates at its junction with K-18 southeast of the city.

Lucas Airport is located immediately east of the city. Publicly owned, it has one 2900' asphalt runway and is used for general aviation.

=== Utilities ===
The City of Lucas provides electricity to local residents. Wilson Telephone provides landline telephone service and offers cable television and internet access. Most residents use natural gas provided by Kansas Gas Service for household heat.

== Media ==
Lucas is in the Wichita-Hutchinson, Kansas television market.

== Culture ==
=== Events ===
Each year on the Saturday before Labor Day weekend, the city holds its annual community celebration, the Adams Apple Festival. It includes an art show, a fun run, Scottish Highland Games, contests, and other entertainment. Other annual events include the Spook Parade, a children's costume contest held the Saturday before Halloween, and Santa Claus Day, held the Saturday before Christmas.

Since 1949, Lucas has hosted the K-18 Baseball state tournament. Named for Kansas Highway 18, which runs through town, the league consists of players ages 13–16 throughout communities in western and central Kansas. The K-18 softball state tournament began in 2020.

=== Points of interest ===
In 1996, Kansas Governor Bill Graves named Lucas the "Grassroots Art Capital of Kansas" due to the number of sites in the community devoted to local folk art. The Garden of Eden is a permanent outdoor sculpture exhibit built between 1905 and 1927 by local sculptor Samuel P. Dinsmoor. The site consists of Dinsmoor's home, a "log cabin" constructed of carved limestone, more than 150 sculptures representing his interpretation of the Biblical creation and world history, and a mausoleum housing the remains of Dinsmoor and his first wife. Inspired by Dinsmoor, local resident Florence Deeble constructed a rock garden around her home, using rocks acquired during her travels to construct works representing places she visited. Since 2002, Deeble's house has served as a gallery called the Garden of Isis, exhibiting works made from recycled materials by visual artist Mri-Pilar. The Grassroots Arts Center is a non-profit gallery located downtown which promotes and exhibits the work of Kansas folk artists. Other folk art sites in the city include late, porcelain artist, Eric Abraham's Flying Pig Studio & Gallery, The World's Largest Collection of the World's Smallest Version of the World's Largest Things traveling museum, Bowl Plaza, Miller's park, Fork Art Park, historical mural and the World's Largest Travel Plate.

== Notable people ==
Notable individuals who were born in and/or have lived in Lucas include:

- Samuel P. Dinsmoor (1843–1932), sculptor
- Bill Volok (1910–1991), football tackle

== See also ==
- Wilson Lake and Wilson State Park
- Meades Ranch Triangulation Station, the geodetic base point for the North American Datum of 1927 (NAD 27), which was used as a reference point until 1989.
- National Register of Historic Places listings in Russell County, Kansas
