= Dorrance State Bank =

- U.S. National Register of Historic Places
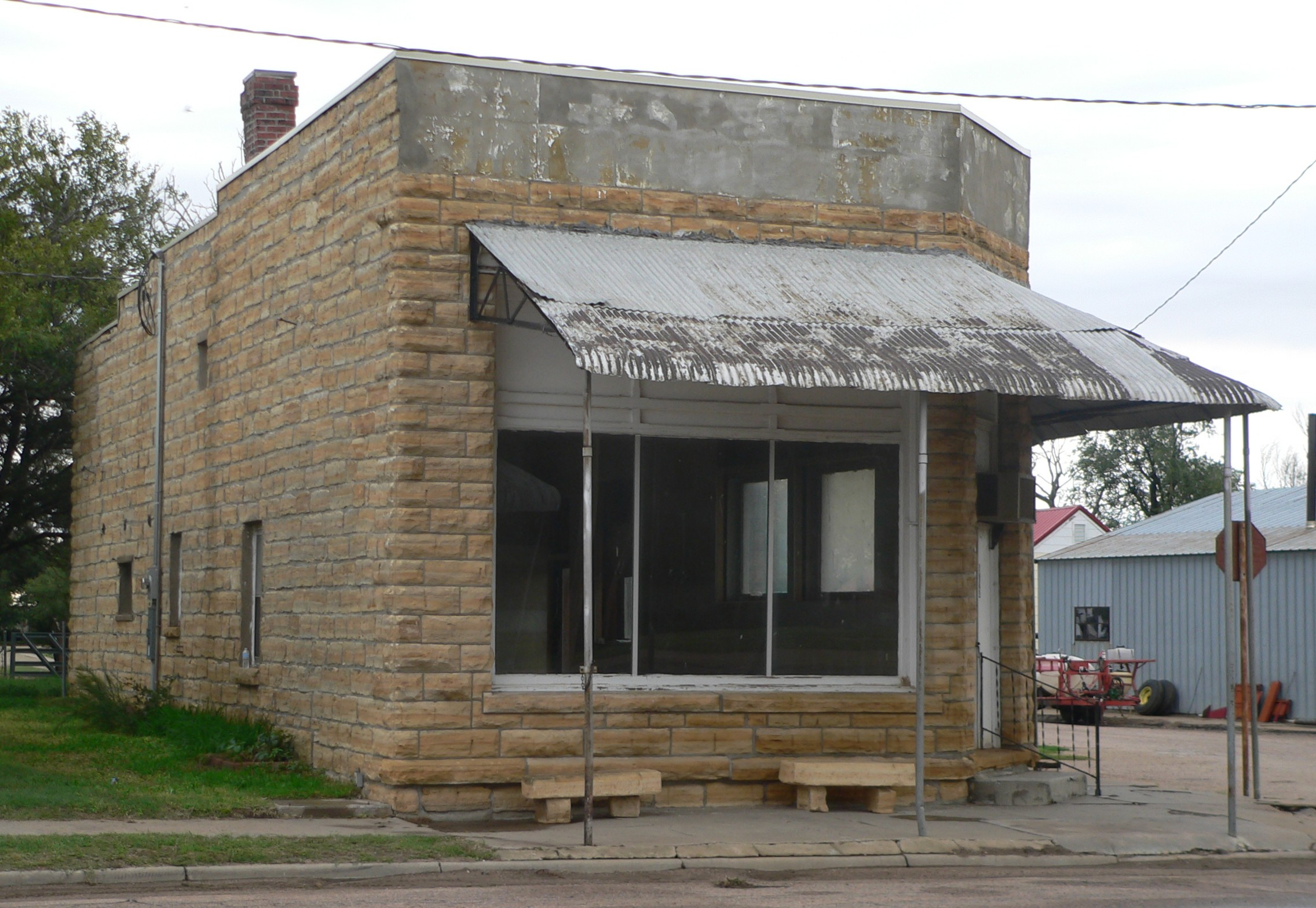

- Location within Kansas
- Location: 512 Main St., Dorrance, Kansas
- Coordinates: 38°50′45″N 98°35′20″W
- Area: less than one acre
- Built: 1905
- Architectural style: Early Commercial
- NRHP reference No.: 11000507
- Added to NRHP: August 4, 2011

The Dorrance State Bank, at 512 Main St. in Dorrance, Kansas, was built in 1905. It was listed on the National Register of Historic Places in 2011.

It is a one-story building built to serve first as the Citizens State Bank.

It is Early Commercial in style.

It served local farmers and merchants in its rural community until it closed in 1933 during the Great Depression.
