= Enoch Tanner Wickham =

American sculptor

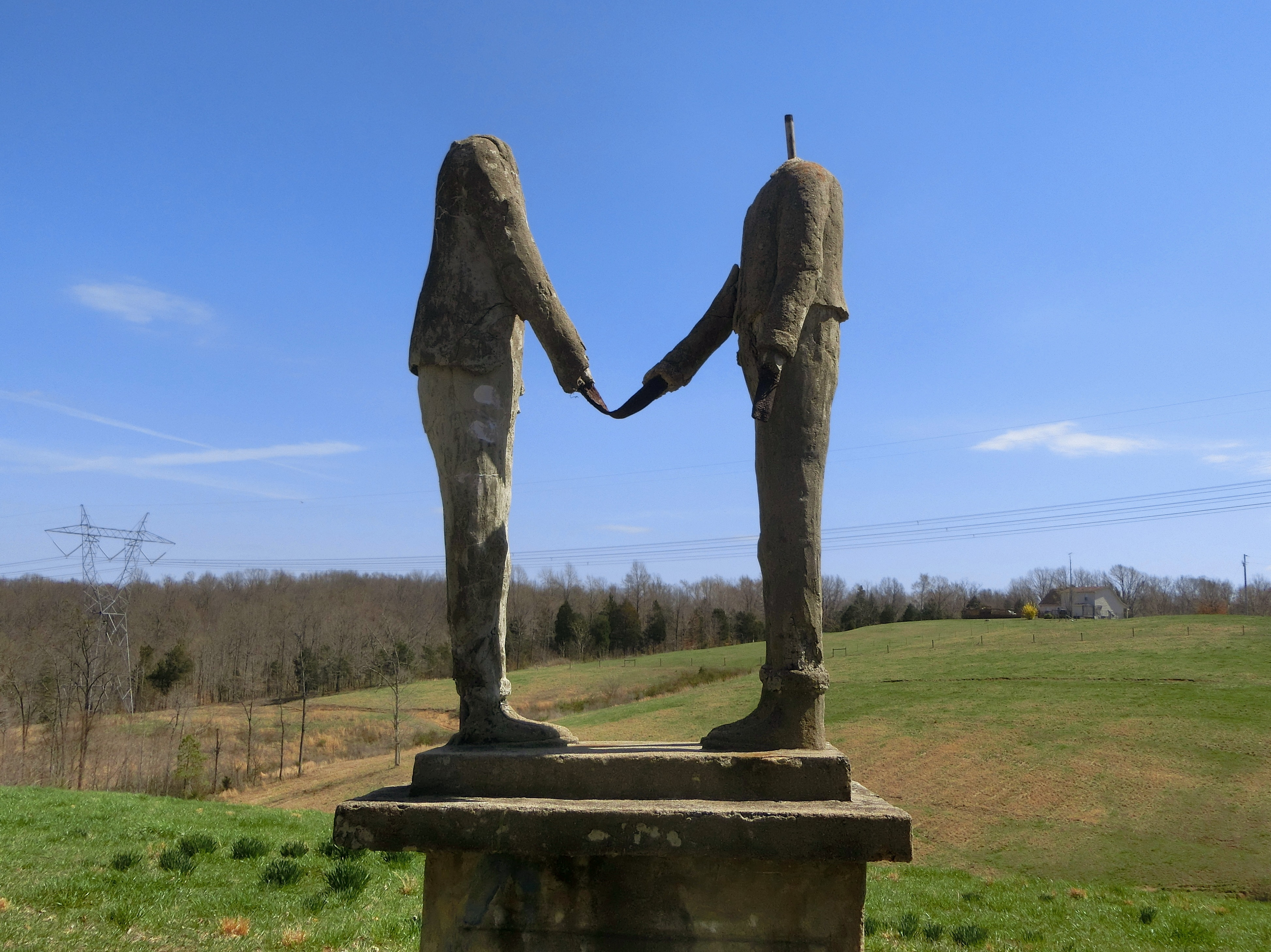
Sam Davis-Bill Marsh Statue

Enoch Tanner Wickham (E.T.), 1882–1970, was a self-taught folk artist who built life-size concrete statues along a rural road in Palmyra, Tennessee. Wickham began his creations in 1950 at the age of 67 after retiring from being a tobacco farmer and raising nine children. The first statue Wickham built was of the Blessed Virgin Mary crushing a snake under her feet. More statues followed of Tecumseh the Indian Chief, and of World War I hero Alvin York. In 1961 Wickham built an equestrian statue of Andrew Jackson. One of his largest statues was a memorial to honor his son Ernest Wickham and other local soldiers of Montgomery County, Tennessee who died in World War II. Wickham continued building statues until his death in 1970. By that time, he had built over forty statues using only simple materials of chicken wire, rebar and concrete.

In 2001 the Customs House Museum in Clarksville, Tennessee had a yearlong exhibition of his work. Today some of the statues still stand along Buck Smith Road in Palmyra in spite of much aging and vandalism. The statues of Alvin York and the sleeping dog have been restored and are displayed in the Trahern Art building at Austin Peay State University in Clarksville, Tennessee. Another statue of a kneeling soldier is located outside Soldier's Chapel in nearby Fort Campbell, Kentucky.

== See also ==
- Ferdinand Cheval
- Samuel P. Dinsmoor
- Howard Finster
- Simon Rodia
