= Norcatur City Hall =

- U.S. National Register of Historic Places
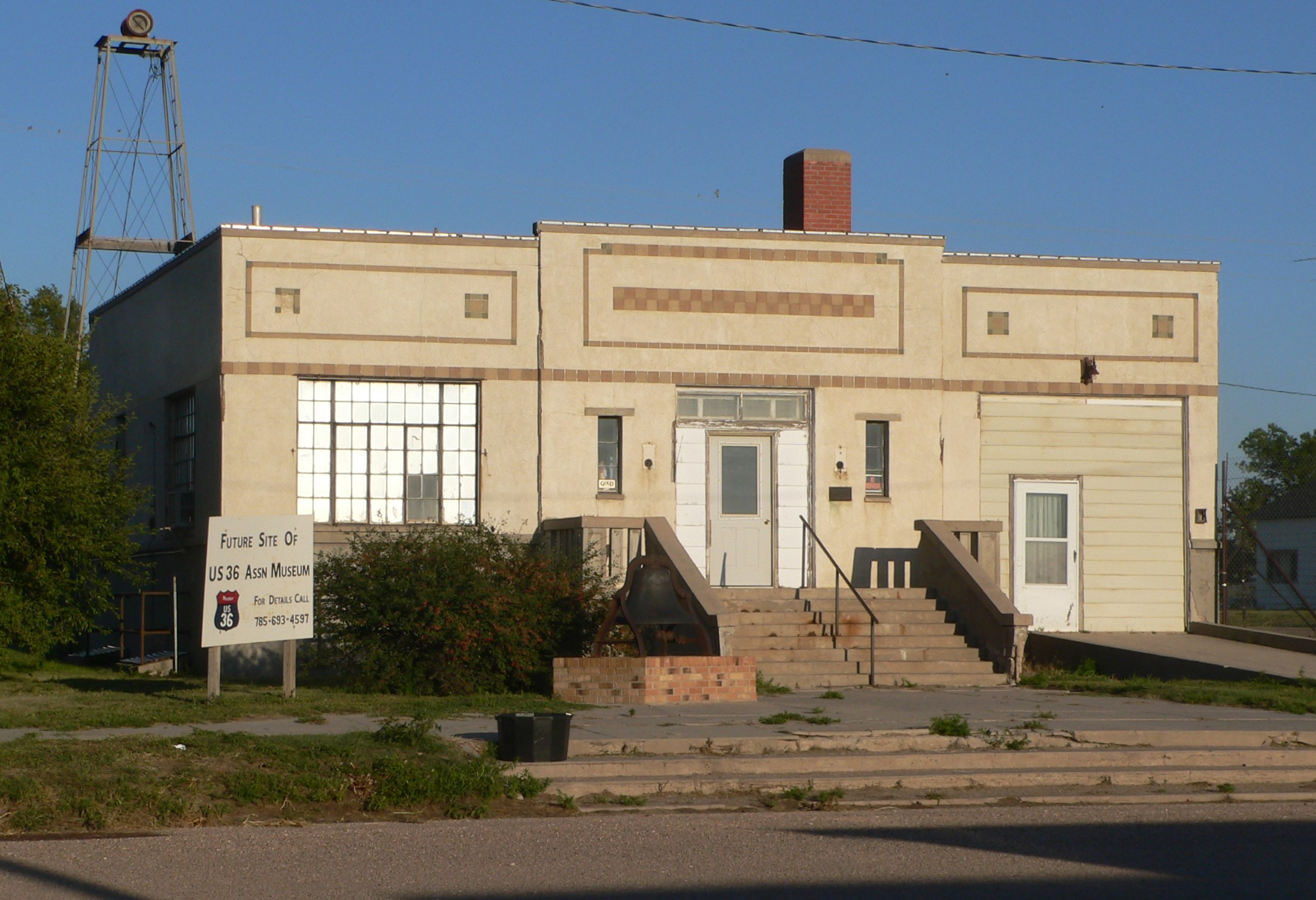
- The Norcatur City Hall in 2014

- Location within Kansas Location within the United States
- Location: 107 N. Decatur Ave., Norcatur, Kansas
- Coordinates: 39°50′14″N 100°11′25″W
- Area: less than one acre
- Built: 1937
- NRHP reference No.: 14000114
- Added to NRHP: April 7, 2014

The Norcatur City Hall, located at 107 N. Decatur Ave. in Norcatur, Kansas, was listed on the National Register of Historic Places in 2014.

It was the city hall of Norcatur, which has population 150.

Built in 1937, it is a raised one-story concrete building 40 by 43.5 feet (12.2 m × 13.3 m) in plan and 27 feet (8.2 m) tall. It has also been known as US Highway 36 Association Museum.
