= Bill Volok =

American football player (1910–1991)

Profile
- Positions: Guard, tackle

Personal information
- Born: March 23, 1910; Lucas, Kansas, U.S.
- Died: August 6, 1991 (aged 81); Drumright, Oklahoma

Career information
- College: Tulsa

Career history
- 1934–1939: Chicago Cardinals

Awards and highlights
- Second-team All-American (1933)

William J. Volok (March 23, 1910 - August 6, 1991) was an American professional football player who was a guard and tackle for six seasons for the Chicago Cardinals of the National Football League (NFL). He played college football for the Tulsa Golden Hurricane.

Volok was 6'2, and, during his six seasons of play time, was 216lbs. He was known to have pep talks with his teammates, often occurring at half time. He attended Lucas High in Kansas.

Volok died in Drumright, Oklahoma, at the age of 81.
