= Fowler, Kansas =

City in Meade County, Kansas

- City
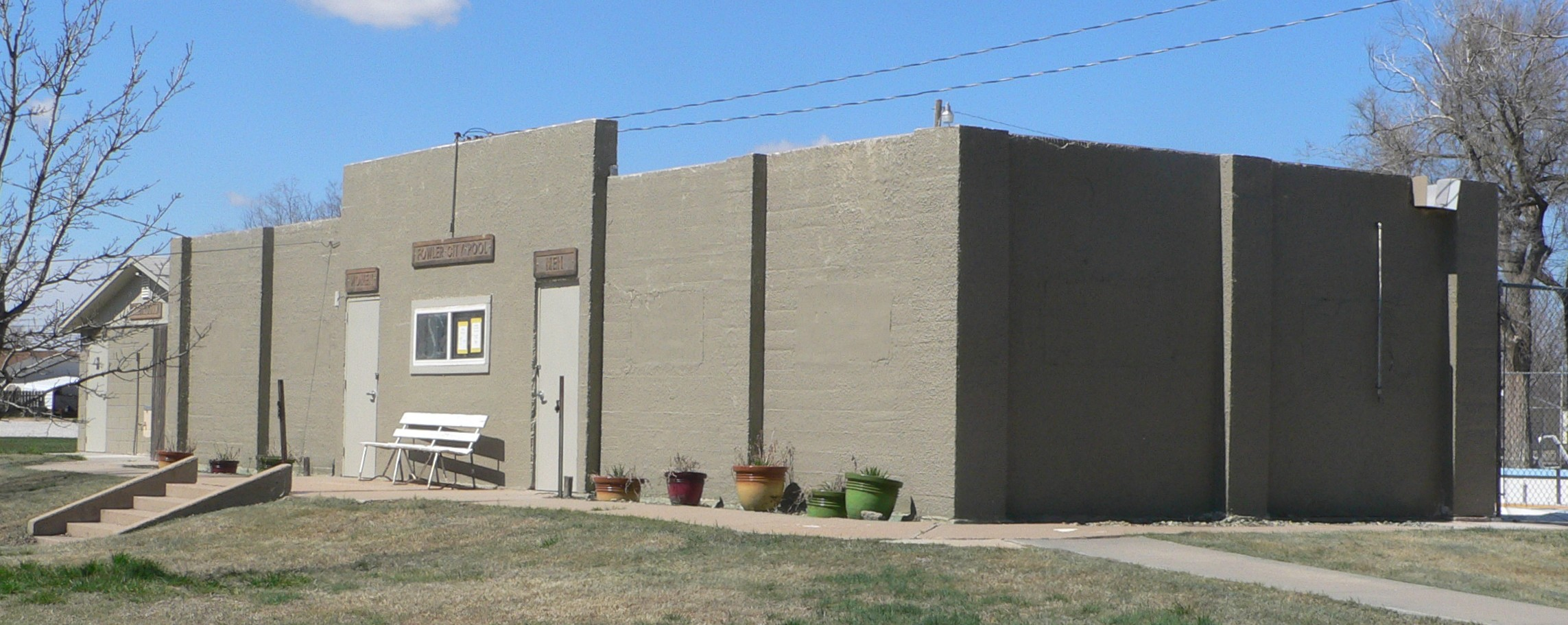
- The Fowler Swimming Pool and Bathhouse is listed on the National Register of Historic Places

- Location within Meade County and Kansas

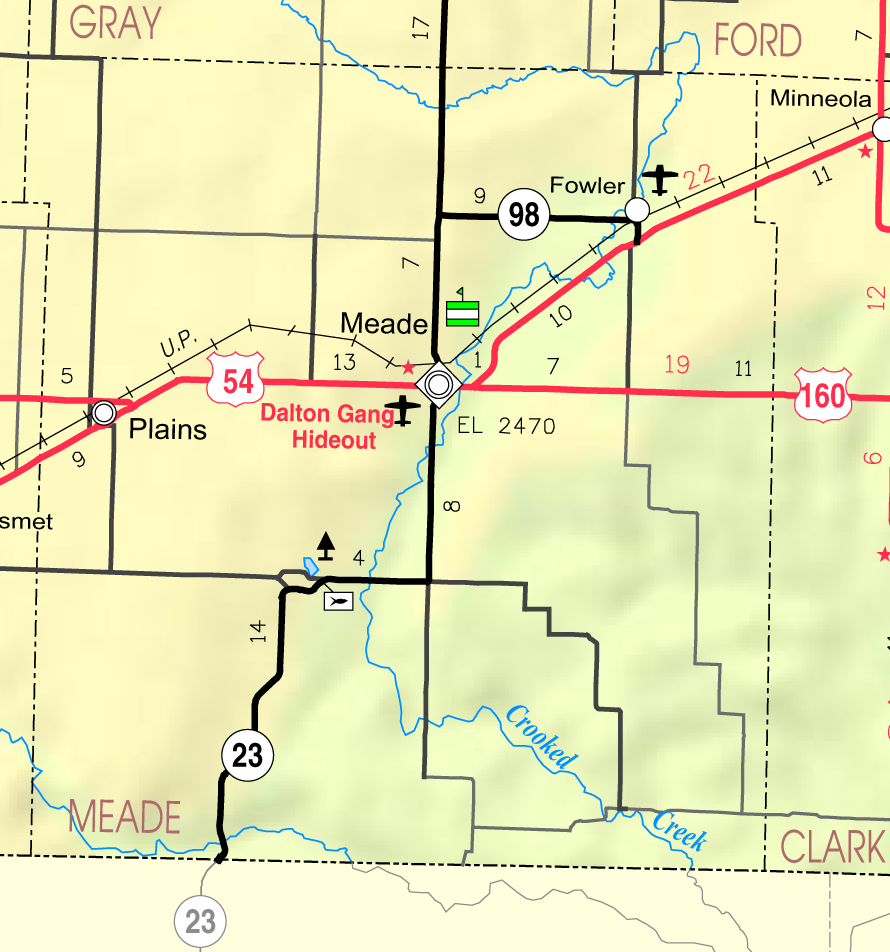
- KDOT map of Meade County (legend)
- Coordinates: 37°22′58″N 100°11′44″W
- Country: United States
- State: Kansas
- County: Meade
- Founded: 1880s
- Platted: 1886
- Incorporated: 1908
- Named for: George Fowler

Area
  - Total: 0.47 sq mi (1.23 km^{2})
  - Land: 0.47 sq mi (1.23 km^{2})
  - Water: 0 sq mi (0.00 km^{2})
- Elevation: 2,487 ft (758 m)

Population (2020)
  - Total: 534
  - Density: 1,120/sq mi (434/km^{2})
- Time zone: UTC-6 (CST)
  - Summer (DST): UTC-5 (CDT)
- ZIP Code: 67844
- Area code: 620
- FIPS code: 20-24175
- GNIS ID: 2394802
- Website: fowler.krwa.net

Fowler is a city in Meade County, Kansas, United States. As of the 2020 census, the population of the city was 534.

== History ==
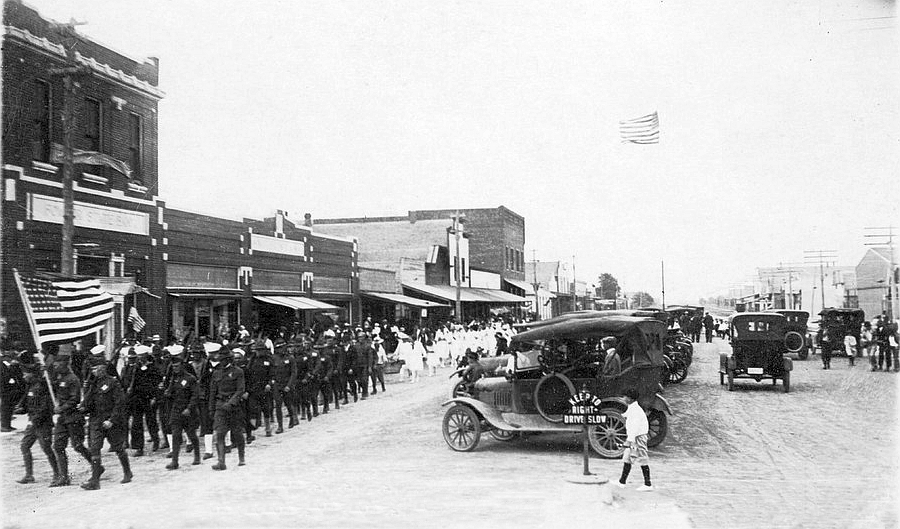
Memorial Day Parade (1919)

Fowler was laid out and platted in 1886. It was named for George Fowler, the original owner of the town site.

Fowler was a shipping point on the Chicago, Rock Island and Pacific Railroad.

== Geography ==
According to the United States Census Bureau, the city has a total area of 0.47 square miles (1.22 km^{2}), all land.

=== Climate ===
According to the Köppen Climate Classification system, Fowler has a semi-arid climate, abbreviated "BSk" on climate maps.

== Demographics ==
Historical population
Census	Pop.	Note	%±
1910	473		—
1920	490		3.6%
1930	724		47.8%
1940	563		−22.2%
1950	778		38.2%
1960	717		−7.8%
1970	588		−18.0%
1980	592		0.7%
1990	571		−3.5%
2000	567		−0.7%
2010	590		4.1%
2020	534		−9.5%
U.S. Decennial Census

=== 2020 census ===
The 2020 United States census counted 534 people, 207 households, and 128 families in Fowler. The population density was 1,126.6 per square mile (435.0/km^{2}). There were 273 housing units at an average density of 575.9 per square mile (222.4/km^{2}). The racial makeup was 76.22% (407) white or European American (70.6% non-Hispanic white), 2.81% (15) black or African-American, 0.56% (3) Native American or Alaska Native, 0.0% (0) Asian, 0.0% (0) Pacific Islander or Native Hawaiian, 10.3% (55) from other races, and 10.11% (54) from two or more races. Hispanic or Latino of any race was 23.97% (128) of the population.

Of the 207 households, 27.5% had children under the age of 18; 51.7% were married couples living together; 23.7% had a female householder with no spouse or partner present. 34.8% of households consisted of individuals and 17.4% had someone living alone who was 65 years of age or older. The average household size was 1.9 and the average family size was 2.9. The percent of those with a bachelor's degree or higher was estimated to be 9.9% of the population.

27.2% of the population was under the age of 18, 4.9% from 18 to 24, 26.0% from 25 to 44, 22.8% from 45 to 64, and 19.1% who were 65 years of age or older. The median age was 38.7 years. For every 100 females, there were 89.4 males. For every 100 females ages 18 and older, there were 95.5 males.

The 2016–2020 5-year American Community Survey estimates show that the median household income was $39,500 (with a margin of error of +/- $8,421) and the median family income was $42,361 (+/- $12,647). Males had a median income of $32,993 (+/- $2,576) versus $21,806 (+/- $7,326) for females. The median income for those above 16 years old was $30,598 (+/- $5,371). Approximately, 15.9% of families and 19.0% of the population were below the poverty line, including 36.8% of those under the age of 18 and 5.1% of those ages 65 or over.

=== 2010 census ===
As of the census of 2010, there were 590 people, 231 households, and 150 families residing in the city. The population density was 1,255.3 inhabitants per square mile (484.7/km^{2}). There were 273 housing units at an average density of 580.9 per square mile (224.3/km^{2}). The racial makeup of the city was 91.5% White, 1.0% African American, 0.7% Native American, 0.8% Asian, 4.1% from other races, and 1.9% from two or more races. Hispanic or Latino of any race were 12.9% of the population.

There were 231 households, of which 37.2% had children under the age of 18 living with them, 51.9% were married couples living together, 8.7% had a female householder with no husband present, 4.3% had a male householder with no wife present, and 35.1% were non-families. 32.9% of all households were made up of individuals, and 19.1% had someone living alone who was 65 years of age or older. The average household size was 2.46 and the average family size was 3.14.

The median age in the city was 39.9 years. 27.6% of residents were under the age of 18; 5.6% were between the ages of 18 and 24; 23.3% were from 25 to 44; 22.5% were from 45 to 64; and 20.8% were 65 years of age or older. The gender makeup of the city was 49.2% male and 50.8% female.

== Education ==
The community is served by Fowler USD 225 public school district with one school: Fowler Elementary School. Fowler High School is non-functional as of 2023.

== Notable people ==
- Tim Huelskamp, Congressman representing Kansas' 1st Congressional District (2011–2017).
