= Jewell County Courthouse =

- U.S. National Register of Historic Places
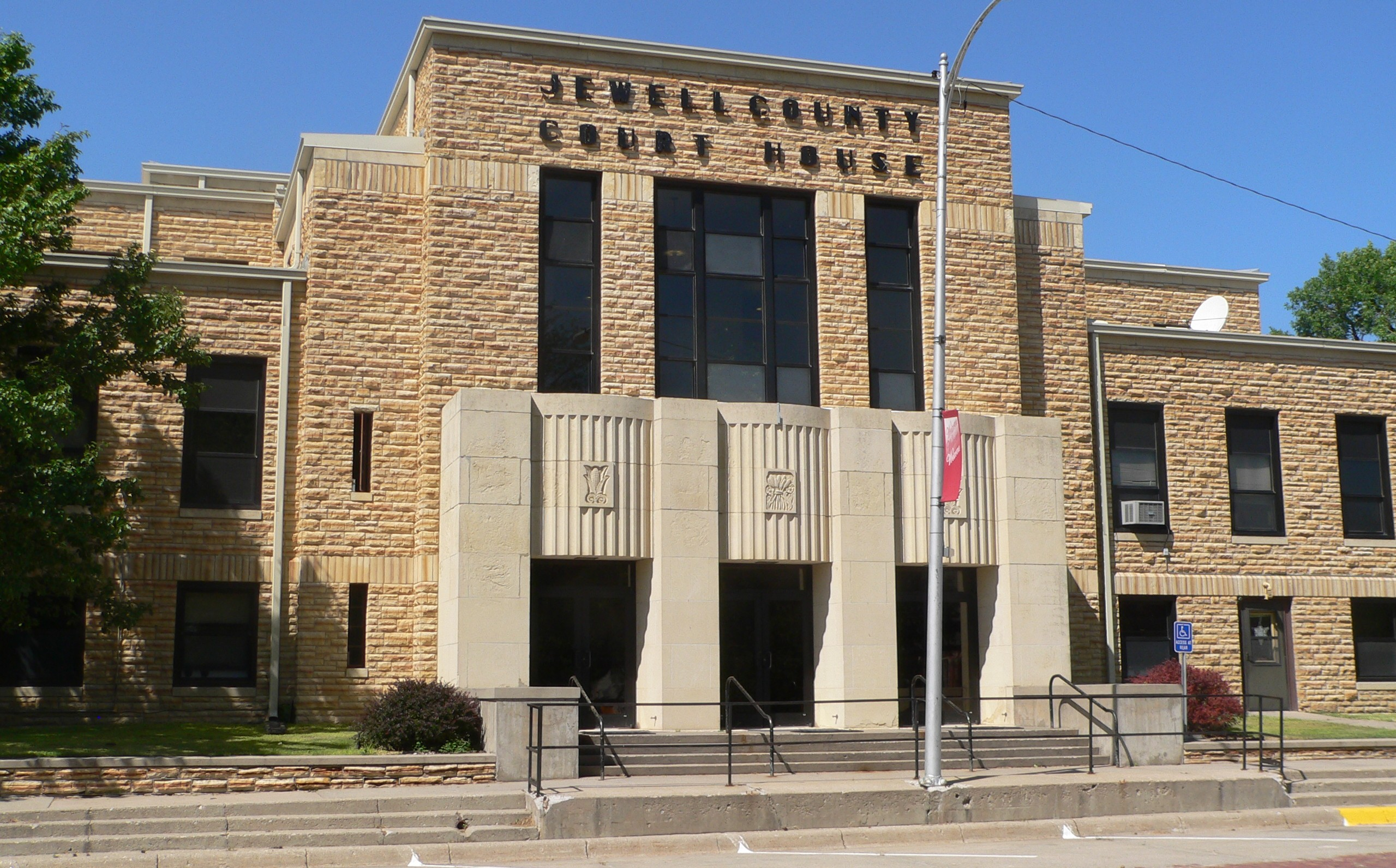

- Location within Kansas Location within the United States
- Location: 307 N. Commercial St., Mankato, Kansas
- Coordinates: 39°47′18″N 98°12′37″W
- Area: less than one acre
- Built: 1937
- Built by: John V. Mertz
- Architect: Joseph W. Radstinsky
- Architectural style: Art Deco
- MPS: County Courthouses of Kansas MPS
- NRHP reference No.: 02000397
- Added to NRHP: April 26, 2002

The Jewell County Courthouse, at 307 N. Commercial St. in Mankato, Kansas, was built in Art Deco style in 1937. It was listed on the National Register of Historic Places in 2002.

The architect was Joseph W. Radotinsky and the building contractor was John V. Mertz.
