= Fowler Swimming Pool and Bathhouse =

- U.S. National Register of Historic Places
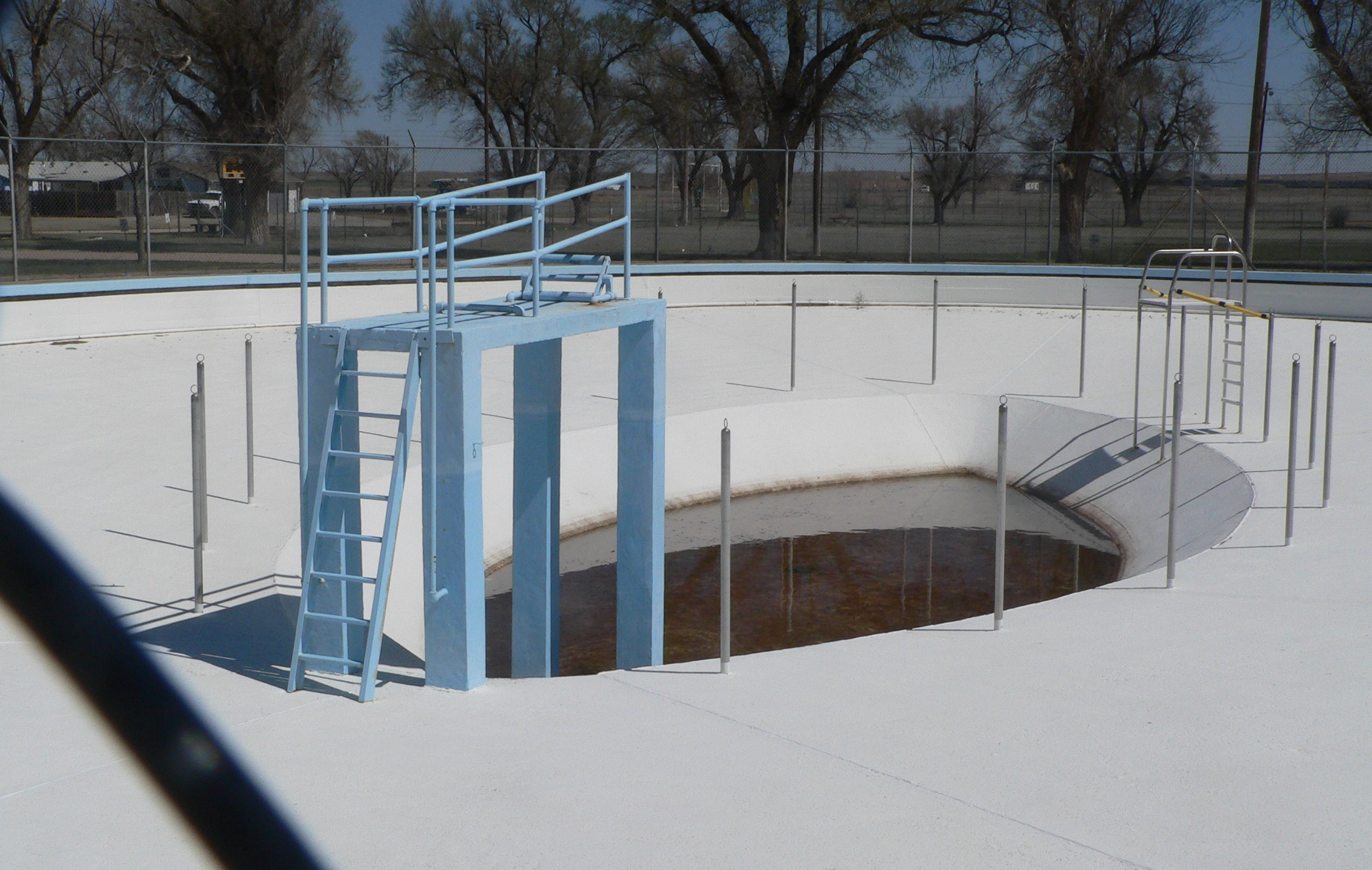
- Central diving area, photographed during off-season

- Location within Kansas Location within the United States
- Location: 308 E. 6th, Fowler, Kansas
- Coordinates: 37.383272°N 100.191906°W
- Built: 1936
- Built by: Suit, Charles W.
- Architectural style: Moderne
- MPS: New Deal-Era Resources of Kansas MPS
- NRHP reference No.: 09000030
- Added to NRHP: February 17, 2009

The Fowler Swimming Pool and Bathhouse, located at 308 E. 6th in Fowler, Kansas, was built in 1936 by the Works Progress Administration, a New Deal work program. It includes an oval pool and a bathhouse designed in Moderne style architecture. It was listed on the National Register of Historic Places in 2009. The listing included the pool and bathhouse as contributing elements and a restroom building as a non-contributing building.

It was deemed significant as an example of a New Deal-era program providing social and recreational resources. It was one of 40 swimming pools facilities in Kansas that were built or improved by the Works Progress Administration.
