= Grant County Courthouse District =

- U.S. National Register of Historic Places
- U.S. Historic district
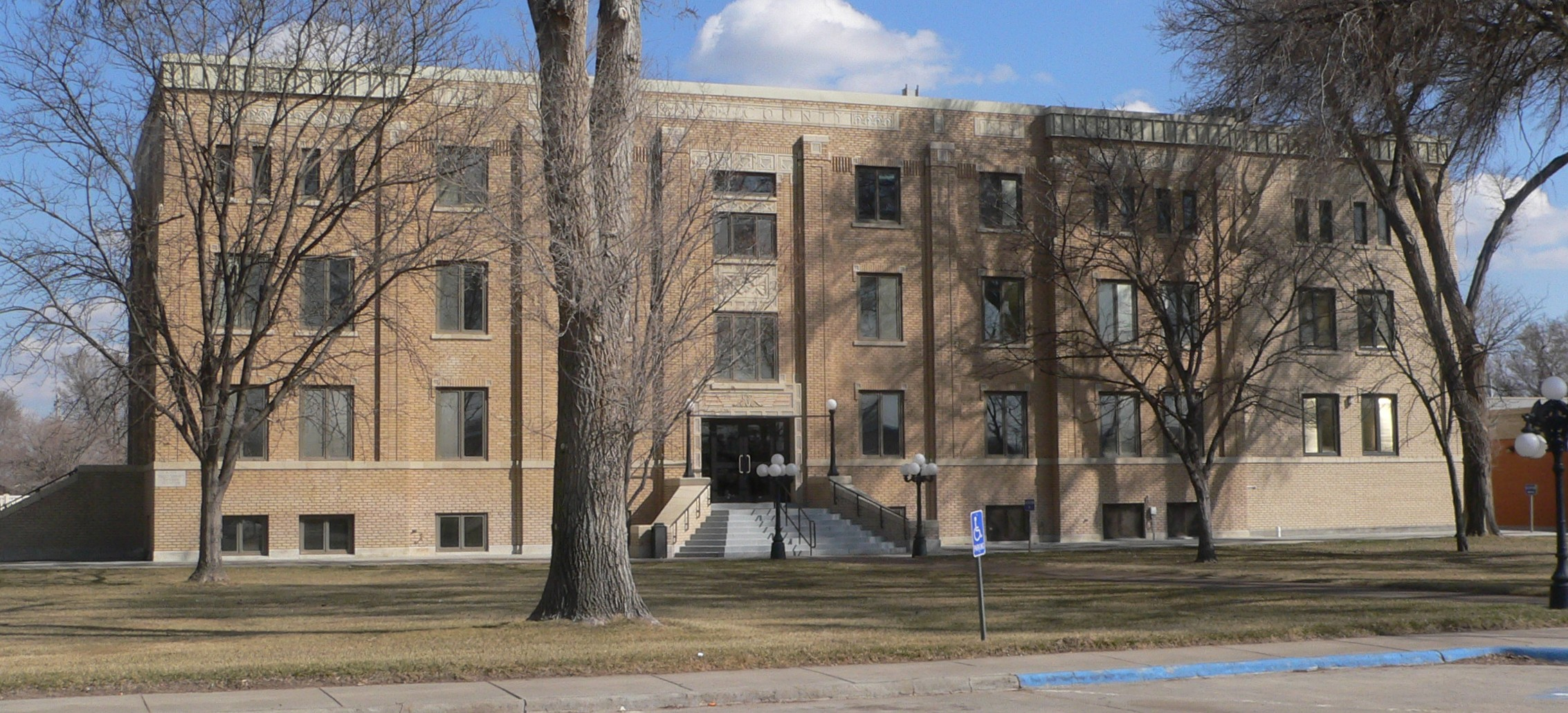

- Location within Kansas Location within the United States
- Location: 108 S. Glenn St., Ulysses, Kansas
- Coordinates: 37°34′49″N 101°21′22″W
- Area: less than one acre
- Built: 1929
- Built by: Fuller, J.M.
- Architect: Smith & English
- Architectural style: Art Deco
- MPS: County Courthouses of Kansas MPS
- NRHP reference No.: 02000396
- Added to NRHP: April 26, 2002

The Grant County Courthouse District in Ulysses, Kansas is a historic district which was listed on the National Register of Historic Places in 2002.

The Grant County Courthouse is a four-story Art Deco-style building constructed during 1929-30.

It was designed by architects Smith and English of Hutchinson, Kansas, and it was built by contractor J.M. Fuller. The district also includes a four-story addition that extended the building, and a connected jail annex.

It was listed on the National Register of Historic Places in 2002. It was deemed significant for politics/government association and for its architecture: the courthouse is one of few Art Deco-style courthouses in Kansas.
