= Earl H. Ellis VFW Post No. 1362 =

- Earl H. Ellis VFW Post #1362
- Formerly listed on the U.S. National Register of Historic Places
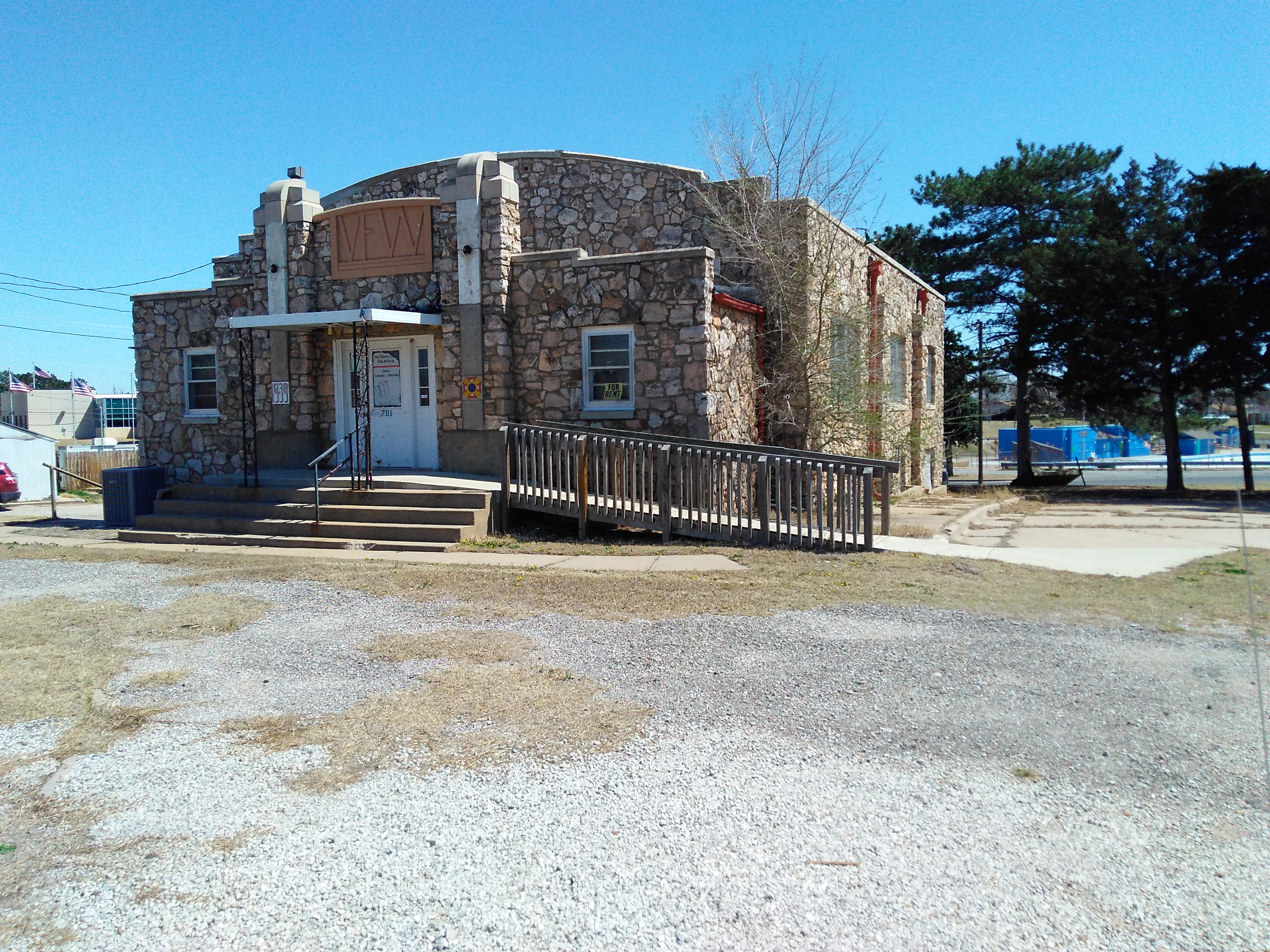

- Location within Kansas Location within the United States
- Location: 701 E. 1st St. Pratt, Kansas
- Coordinates: 37°38′45″N 98°43′53″W
- Area: less than one acre
- Built: 1939
- Built by: H.V. Crull
- Architectural style: Art Deco
- NRHP reference No.: 06000597

Significant dates
- Added to NRHP: July 12, 2006
- Removed from NRHP: November 26, 2024

The Earl Hancock Ellis VFW Post #1362, located at 701 E. 1st St. in Pratt, Kansas, was built in 1939. It was listed on the National Register of Historic Places in 2006.

It has been said to constitute "a good example of a late Art Deco structure featuring native stone construction."

It was deemed "significant architecturally and socially as a reflection of the history of the community of Pratt."

The listing included, in addition to the building, two contributing objects.
