= Washington County Courthouse (Kansas) =

- U.S. National Register of Historic Places
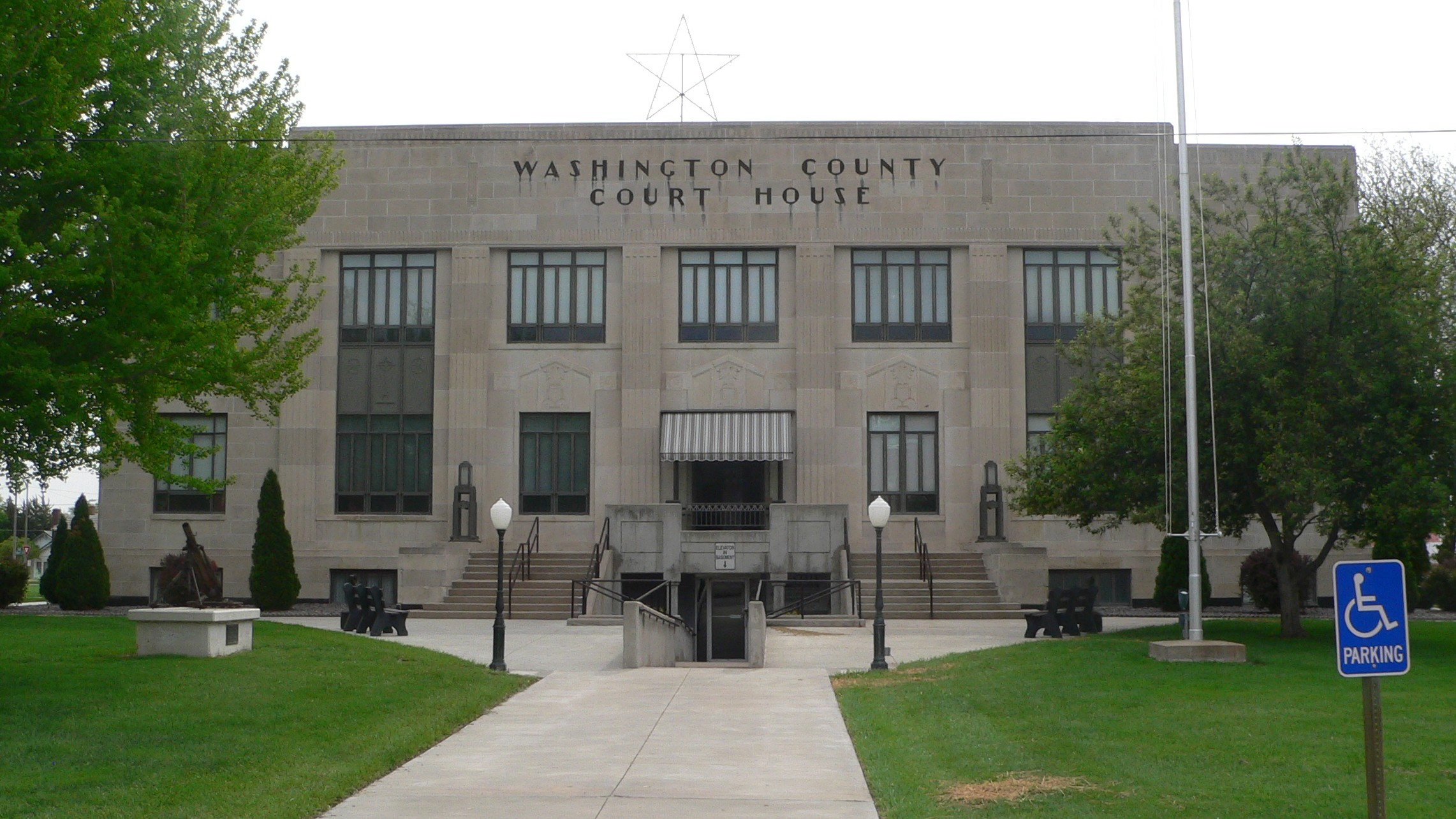
- The Washington County Courthouse in 2015

- Location within Kansas Location within the United States
- Location: 214 C St., Washington, Kansas
- Coordinates: 39°49′4″N 97°3′2″W
- Area: 2.5 acres (1.0 ha)
- Built: c. 1932–1934
- Built by: Blaser and Vollmer
- Architects: Overend and Boucher
- Architectural style: Art Deco
- NRHP reference No.: 00000328
- Added to NRHP: April 6, 2000

The Washington County Courthouse located at 214 C St. in Washington, Kansas, is an Art Deco-style courthouse built during c. 1932–1934. It was listed on the National Register of Historic Places in 2000.

It replaced a previous courthouse which was damaged in a tornado on July 4, 1932. The new courthouse was designed by Wichita architects Overend and Boucher.

It is a two-story building built of Bedford limestone. It has two-story square towers projecting from each corner.
