= Power Plant No. 1 =

- U.S. National Register of Historic Places
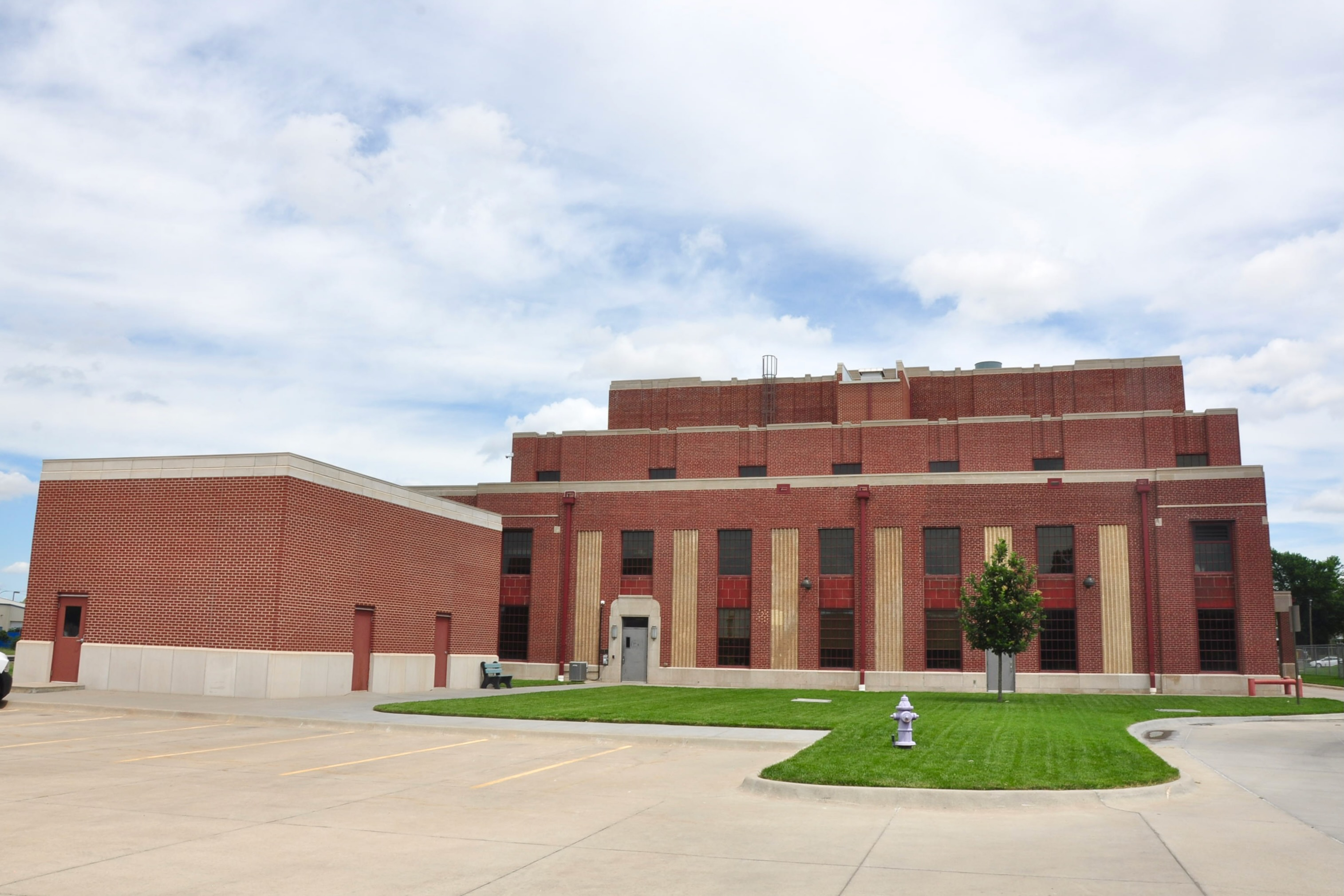

- Location within Kansas Location within the United States
- Location: 414 W Elizabeth, McPherson, Kansas
- Coordinates: 38°22′07″N 97°40′18″W
- Architectural style: Art Deco
- NRHP reference No.: 07001067
- Added to NRHP: October 10, 2007

Power Plant No. 1 is an historic oil-burning power plant at 414 West Elizabeth Street in McPherson, Kansas. The plant was added to the National Historic Register in 2007.

It was built in three phases from 1934 to 1947, and in combination the work achieves a refined Art Deco style. The building held steam boilers and turbines.
