= Howard T. Sawhill City Park =

- St. Francis City Park
- U.S. National Register of Historic Places
- U.S. Historic district
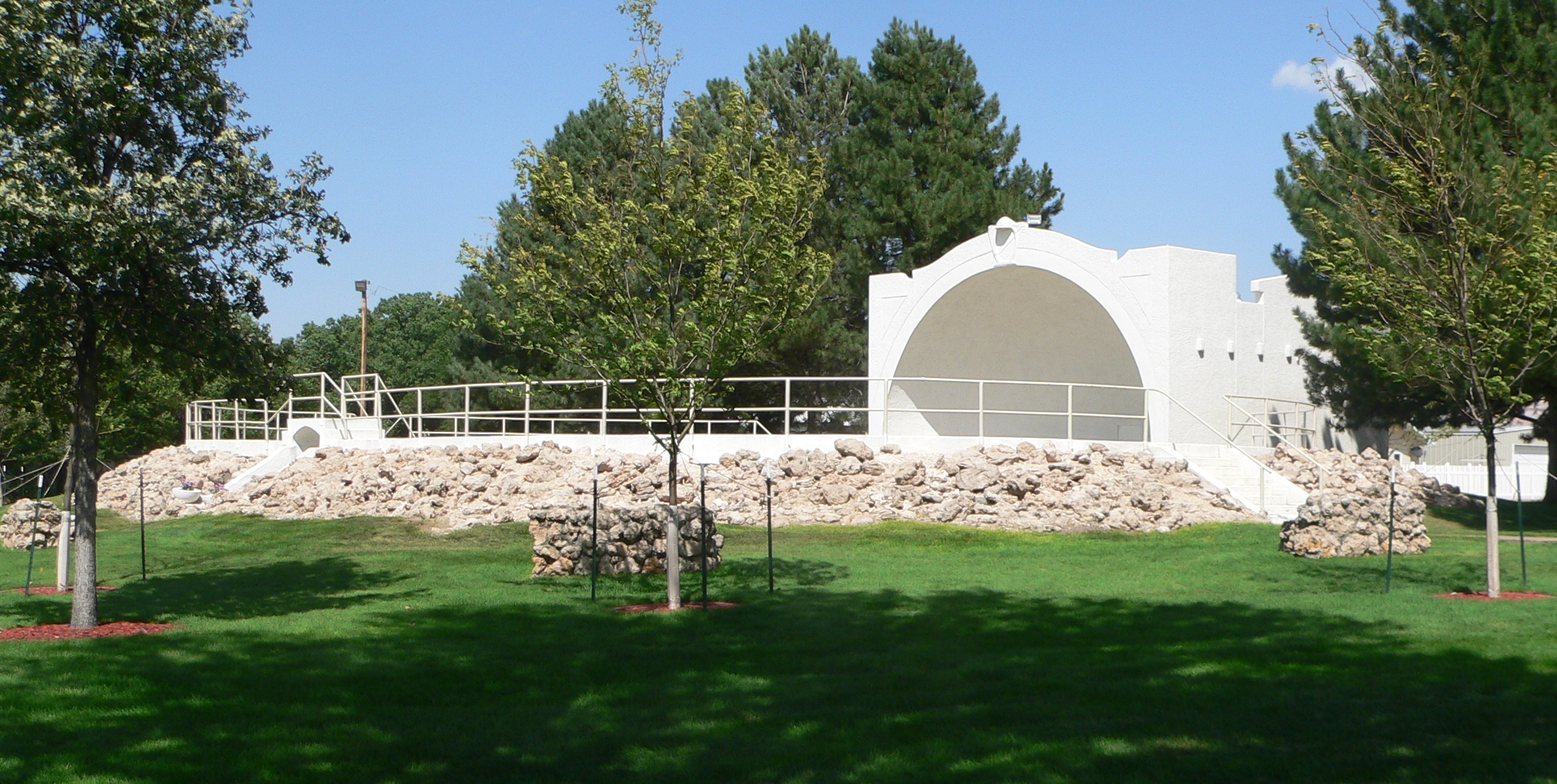

- Location within Kansas Location within the United States
- Location: 300 block of E. Washington, St. Francis, Kansas
- Coordinates: 39°46′30″N 101°47′54″W
- MPS: New Deal-Era Resources of Kansas MPS
- NRHP reference No.: 08000645
- Added to NRHP: July 10, 2008

Howard T. Sawhill City Park, also known as St. Francis City Park, is a park in St. Francis, Kansas, United States. It was listed as a historic district on the National Register of Historic Places on July 10, 2008.

The park has a band shell and an oval amphitheater and a flagpole. It is laid out around a central fountain.
