= Samuel P. Dinsmoor =

American educator and sculptor

- Garden of Eden
- U.S. National Register of Historic Places
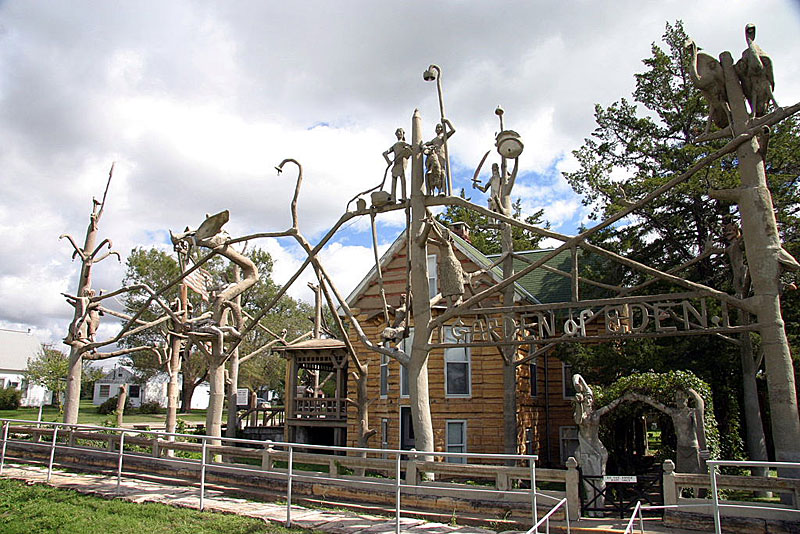

- Location within Kansas Location within the United States
- Location: 2nd and Kansas Ave; Lucas, Kansas; United States
- Coordinates: 39°3′33″N 98°32′4″W
- Area: 1 acre (0.40 ha)
- Built: 1905-1907
- Architect: Samuel P. Dinsmoor
- NRHP reference No.: 77000595
- Added to NRHP: April 28, 1977

Samuel Perry Dinsmoor (March 8, 1843 – July 21, 1932) was an American teacher and eccentric sculptor from Lucas, Kansas, United States.

== Early life ==
Dinsmoor was born near Coolville, Ohio. He served in the Civil War for three years in the Union Army, during which he witnessed eighteen major battles, among them the Battle of Gettysburg. After the war, he worked as a schoolteacher in Illinois for five years. He later took up farming and moved to Kansas in 1888. He briefly moved to Nebraska in 1890 only to return to Kansas the following year after losing most of his belongings in a house fire. He retired in 1905 and began a second career as a sculptor.

== Garden of Eden ==
Dinsmoor built and moved into a log cabin on a lot that he named the Garden of Eden in Lucas, Kansas. The cabin is a twelve-room house; the logs are made up of limestone quarried near Wilson Lake. Dinsmoor designed his landscape and spent the rest of his life creating the garden, which contains over 200 concrete sculptures. The sculptures and design of the house reflect Dinsmoor's belief in the Populist movement and his religious convictions, it includes a Labor Crucified figure that is surrounded by the people who put him on the Cross, a doctor, lawyer, preacher and capitalist.

The coffins for Dinsmoor and his first wife, Frances A. Barlow Journey, are inside the mausoleum in one corner of the lot. As part of a tour, visitors can view his body in its concrete coffin with a glass lid. Inside the mausoleum is also a double-exposed photo of him viewing his own deceased body inside the coffin.

The site was put on the National Register of Historic Places on April 28, 1977.

== Personal life ==
Dinsmoor married Frances A. Barlow Journey on August 24, 1870. After she died in 1917, he married Emilie Brozek; he was 81 and she was 22 at the time. They had two children. His son John was a Colonel in the United States Air Force and served in the Vietnam War.

== See also ==
- Ferdinand Cheval
- Enoch Tanner Wickham
- Howard Finster
- Simon Rodia
