= Luray, Kansas =

City in the United States

- City
- Location within Russell County and Kansas

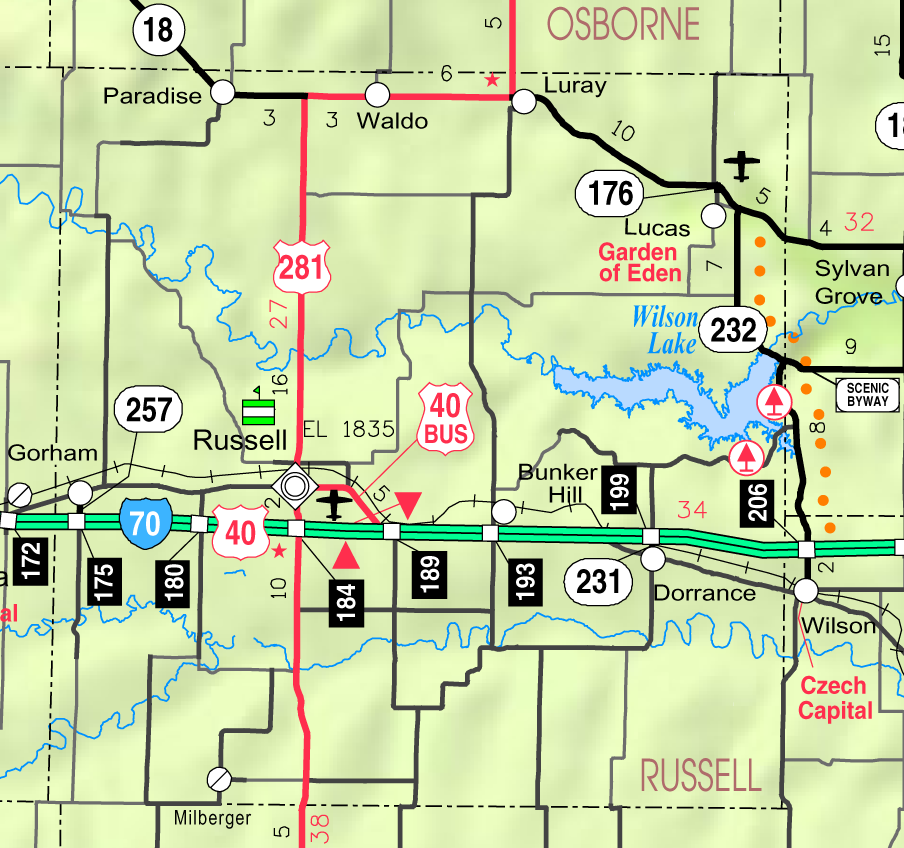
- KDOT map of Russell County (legend)
- Coordinates: 39°6′50″N 98°41′29″W
- Country: United States
- State: Kansas
- County: Russell
- Founded: 1870s
- Incorporated: 1904

Area
  - Total: 0.33 sq mi (0.86 km^{2})
  - Land: 0.33 sq mi (0.86 km^{2})
  - Water: 0 sq mi (0.00 km^{2})
- Elevation: 1,572 ft (479 m)

Population (2020)
  - Total: 166
  - Density: 500/sq mi (190/km^{2})
- Time zone: UTC-6 (CST)
  - Summer (DST): UTC-5 (CDT)
- ZIP Code: 67649
- Area code: 785
- FIPS code: 20-43250
- GNIS ID: 472534

Luray is a city in Russell County, Kansas, United States. As of the 2020 census, the population of the city was 166.

== History ==
Luray was established as the community of Lura in the 1870s. In 1887, the spelling of the town's name was changed to Luray. Luray incorporated as a city in 1904.

== Geography ==
Luray is located at the junction of U.S. Route 281 and Kansas Highway 18 (K-18) in north-central Kansas, Luray is 118 miles (190 km) northwest of Wichita, 218 miles (351 km) west of Kansas City and 18 miles (29 km) northeast of Russell, the county seat.

Located in the Smoky Hills region of the Great Plains, Luray sits on the north side of Wolf Creek, a tributary of the Saline River. Coon Creek, a tributary of Wolf Creek, flows southeast along the eastern edge of the community.

According to the United States Census Bureau, the city has a total area of 0.32 square miles (0.83 km^{2}), all of it land.

=== Climate ===
The climate in this area is characterized by hot, humid summers and generally mild to cool winters. According to the Köppen Climate Classification system, Luray has a humid subtropical climate, abbreviated "Cfa" on climate maps.

== Demographics ==
Historical population
Census	Pop.	Note	%±
1910	341		—
1920	475		39.3%
1930	464		−2.3%
1940	392		−15.5%
1950	351		−10.5%
1960	328		−6.6%
1970	303		−7.6%
1980	295		−2.6%
1990	261		−11.5%
2000	203		−22.2%
2010	194		−4.4%
2020	166		−14.4%
U.S. Decennial Census

=== 2020 census ===
The 2020 United States census counted 166 people, 71 households, and 45 families in Luray. The population density was 500.0 per square mile (193.1/km^{2}). There were 112 housing units at an average density of 337.3 per square mile (130.3/km^{2}). The racial makeup was 95.78% (159) white or European American (94.58% non-Hispanic white), 0.0% (0) black or African-American, 0.0% (0) Native American or Alaska Native, 1.2% (2) Asian, 0.0% (0) Pacific Islander or Native Hawaiian, 0.0% (0) from other races, and 3.01% (5) from two or more races. Hispanic or Latino of any race was 1.2% (2) of the population.

Of the 71 households, 21.1% had children under the age of 18; 46.5% were married couples living together; 23.9% had a female householder with no spouse or partner present. 31.0% of households consisted of individuals and 19.7% had someone living alone who was 65 years of age or older. The average household size was 2.4 and the average family size was 3.0. The percent of those with a bachelor's degree or higher was estimated to be 18.7% of the population.

26.5% of the population was under the age of 18, 1.8% from 18 to 24, 24.1% from 25 to 44, 21.7% from 45 to 64, and 25.9% who were 65 years of age or older. The median age was 40.0 years. For every 100 females, there were 110.1 males. For every 100 females ages 18 and older, there were 114.0 males.

The 2016–2020 5-year American Community Survey estimates show that the median household income was $50,781 (with a margin of error of +/- $11,353) and the median family income was $80,625 (+/- $51,769). Males had a median income of $31,875 (+/- $27,288) versus $26,250 (+/- $11,055) for females. The median income for those above 16 years old was $27,917 (+/- $9,726). Approximately, 2.2% of families and 6.2% of the population were below the poverty line, including 0.0% of those under the age of 18 and 0.0% of those ages 65 or over.

=== 2010 census ===
As of the 2010 census, there were 194 people, 94 households, and 61 families residing in the city. The population density was 646.7 inhabitants per square mile (249.7/km^{2}). There were 134 housing units at an average density of 446.7 per square mile (172.5/km^{2}). The racial makeup of the city was 97.9% White and 2.1% from two or more races. Hispanics and Latinos of any race were 1.5% of the population.

There were 94 households, of which 17.0% had children under the age of 18 living with them, 58.5% were married couples living together, 1.1% had a male householder with no wife present, 5.3% had a female householder with no husband present, and 35.1% were non-families. 31.9% of all households were made up of individuals, and 17.0% had someone living alone who was 65 years of age or older. The average household size was 2.06, and the average family size was 2.48.

In the city, the population was spread out, with 14.4% under the age of 18, 7.3% from 18 to 24, 17.5% from 25 to 44, 30.9% from 45 to 64, and 29.9% who were 65 years of age or older. The median age was 50.7 years. For every 100 females, there were 100 males. For every 100 females age 18 and over, there were 100 males age 18 and over.

The median income for a household in the city was $36,563, and the median income for a family was $57,500. The per capita income for the city was $29,168. Males had a median income of $39,375 versus $42,813 for females. 1.5% of families and 5.6% of the population were below the poverty line, including 6.3% of those under age 18 and 3.9% of those age 65 or over.

== Economy ==
As of 2012, 58.9% of the population over the age of 16 was in the labor force. 0.0% was in the armed forces, and 58.9% was in the civilian labor force with 56.0% being employed and 2.9% unemployed. The composition, by occupation, of the employed civilian labor force was: 37.1% in management, business, science, and arts; 25.9% in natural resources, construction, and maintenance; 14.7% in production, transportation, and material moving; 14.7% in sales and office occupations; and 7.8% in service occupations. The three industries employing the largest percentages of the working civilian labor force were: educational services, and health care and social assistance (18.1%); professional, scientific, and management, and administrative and waste management services (17.2%); and manufacturing (17.2%).

The cost of living in Luray is relatively low; compared to a U.S. average of 100, the cost of living index for the community is 78.0. As of 2012, the median home value in the city was $33,500, the median selected monthly owner cost was $807 for housing units with a mortgage and $385 for those without, and the median gross rent was $288.

== Government ==
Luray is a city of the third class with a mayor-council form of government. The city council consists of five members, and it meets on the first Wednesday of each month.

Luray lies within Kansas's 1st U.S. Congressional District. For the purposes of representation in the Kansas Legislature, the city is located in the 36th district of the Kansas Senate and the 109th district of the Kansas House of Representatives.

== Education ==
The community is served by Sylvan–Lucas USD 299 public school district, based in Sylvan Grove, Kansas.

Previously, the city was served by Luray High School. The former school building that served as the Luray School and Luray-Lucas Elementary still stands at the corner of 4th Street and Russell County Avenue, in the northwest corner of the town. Lucas and Luray schools united in 1977 forming Lucas-Luray schools. Lucas-Luray was then united with Sylvan Unified schools in 2010 to form Sylvan-Lucas Unified.

The Luray High School mascot was Luray Panthers. Lucas-Luray High School mascot was the Cougars. Sylvan-Lucas is the Mustangs.

The Luray Panthers won the Kansas State High School 8-Man Football championship in 1975.

== Infrastructure ==
=== Transportation ===
K-18 runs east-west along the northern edge of the city. U.S. Route 281, a north-south route, approaches Luray from the west concurrently with K-18, then turns north. Bunker Hill-Luray Road, a paved north-south county road, enters the city from the south.

The Union Pacific Railroad previously served the city by the way of the Plainville Branch, which was completed in 1888 as the Salina, Lincoln, and Western Railway before coming under Union Pacific ownership in 1898. Regular passenger service ran on the branch between Salina and Oakley until May 31, 1958. The line was abandoned after the Great Flood of 1993 damaged portions of the line, which the railroad deemed too costly to repair. The track was subsequently pulled up in 1995.

=== Utilities ===
The city government provides electricity to local residents. Gorham Telephone provides landline telephone service and offers cable television and internet access. Most residents use natural gas for heating fuel; service is provided by Kansas Gas Service.

== Media ==
Luray is in the Wichita-Hutchinson, Kansas television market.

== Culture ==
=== Events ===
The city of Luray holds an annual community festival, Friendship Day, on the sunday of Labor Day weekend. It includes a parade, an art show, golf and horseshoe tournaments, free barbecue, and homemade ice cream. Annually since 1938, a local Methodist church has held another community event, the Luray Methodist Men's Fish Fry, on the third Friday evening of each March. Men from the church prepare and serve fried fish with trimmings and cherry pie, typically attracting hundreds from the surrounding area.

=== Points of interest ===
The first log cabin constructed in Russell County, built in 1871 by settler Jonathan Van Scoyoc, has been preserved in Luray City Park on the north side of K-18.
