= Dorrance, Kansas =

City in Russell County, Kansas

- City
- Location within Russell County and Kansas

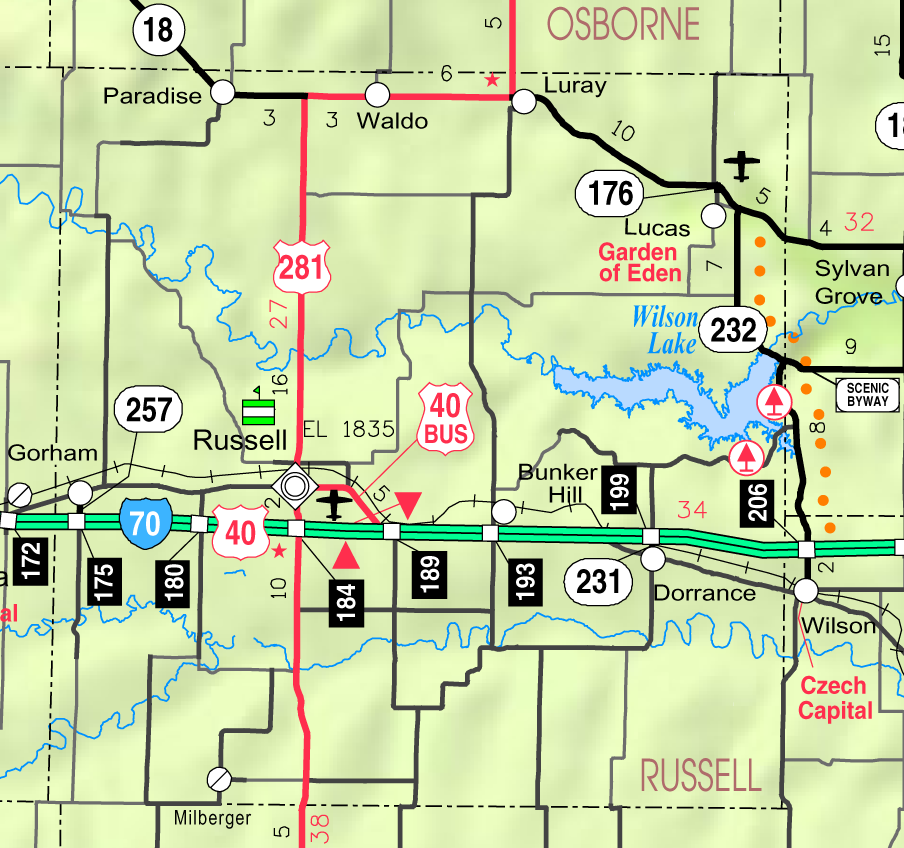
- KDOT map of Russell County (legend)
- Coordinates: 38°50′49″N 98°35′18″W
- Country: United States
- State: Kansas
- County: Russell
- Founded: 1860s
- Platted: 1880
- Incorporated: 1910
- Named for: Oliver Dorrance

Area
  - Total: 0.34 sq mi (0.88 km^{2})
  - Land: 0.34 sq mi (0.88 km^{2})
  - Water: 0 sq mi (0.00 km^{2})
- Elevation: 1,732 ft (528 m)

Population (2020)
  - Total: 146
  - Density: 430/sq mi (170/km^{2})
- Time zone: UTC-6 (CST)
  - Summer (DST): UTC-5 (CDT)
- ZIP Code: 67634
- Area code: 785
- FIPS code: 20-18325
- GNIS ID: 475332

Dorrance is a city in Russell County, Kansas, United States. As of the 2020 census, the population of the city was 146.

== History ==
The Kansas Pacific Railway reached the site of Dorrance in June 1867. German, English, and Irish settlers followed shortly thereafter, forming a small community by 1870. In early 1872, they were joined by a colony of settlers from Pennsylvania. A prairie fire destroyed much of the community's business district in March 1879. The town of Dorrance was formally laid out in 1880, named for Oliver Dorrance, the-then railroad superintendent. The first post office opened in July 1883. Dorrance was incorporated in April 1910 and became a center of goods and services for eastern Russell County.

== Geography ==
Dorrance is located in north-central Kansas, 102 miles (164 km) northwest of Wichita and 214 miles (344 km) west of Kansas City. Located 1/2 mile (0.80 km) south of Interstate 70, it is roughly 15 miles (24 km) east-southeast of Russell, the county seat.

Dorrance lies in the Smoky Hills region of the Great Plains, approximately 3 miles (4.8 km) north of the Smoky Hill River and 6 miles (9.7 km) south of Wilson Lake.

According to the United States Census Bureau, the city has a total area of 0.34 square miles (0.88 km^{2}), all land.

=== Climate ===
The climate in this area is characterized by hot, humid summers and generally mild to cool winters. According to the Köppen Climate Classification system, Dorrance has a humid subtropical climate, abbreviated "Cfa" on climate maps.

== Demographics ==
Historical population
Census	Pop.	Note	%±
1910	281		—
1920	299		6.4%
1930	325		8.7%
1940	414		27.4%
1950	385		−7.0%
1960	331		−14.0%
1970	234		−29.3%
1980	220		−6.0%
1990	195		−11.4%
2000	205		5.1%
2010	185		−9.8%
2020	146		−21.1%
U.S. Decennial Census

=== 2020 census ===
The 2020 United States census counted 146 people, 75 households, and 42 families in Dorrance. The population density was 430.7 per square mile (166.3/km^{2}). There were 97 housing units at an average density of 286.1 per square mile (110.5/km^{2}). The racial makeup was 93.15% (136) white or European American (93.15% non-Hispanic white), 0.0% (0) black or African-American, 0.0% (0) Native American or Alaska Native, 1.37% (2) Asian, 0.0% (0) Pacific Islander or Native Hawaiian, 0.68% (1) from other races, and 4.79% (7) from two or more races. Hispanic or Latino of any race was 0.68% (1) of the population.

Of the 75 households, 16.0% had children under the age of 18; 49.3% were married couples living together; 22.7% had a female householder with no spouse or partner present. 44.0% of households consisted of individuals and 16.0% had someone living alone who was 65 years of age or older. The average household size was 2.6 and the average family size was 3.3. The percent of those with a bachelor's degree or higher was estimated to be 17.8% of the population.

11.0% of the population was under the age of 18, 6.2% from 18 to 24, 21.9% from 25 to 44, 32.9% from 45 to 64, and 28.1% who were 65 years of age or older. The median age was 55.5 years. For every 100 females, there were 84.8 males. For every 100 females ages 18 and older, there were 88.4 males.

The 2016–2020 5-year American Community Survey estimates show that the median household income was $55,000 (with a margin of error of +/- $33,361) and the median family income was $69,444 (+/- $13,544). Females had a median income of $16,641 (+/- $4,228) for females. Approximately, 5.4% of families and 6.2% of the population were below the poverty line, including 12.0% of those under the age of 18 and 0.0% of those ages 65 or over.

=== 2010 census ===
As of the 2010 census, there were 185 people, 85 households, and 51 families residing in the city. The population density was 616.7 inhabitants per square mile (238.1/km^{2}). There were 113 housing units at an average density of 376.7 per square mile (145.4/km^{2}). The racial makeup of the city was 96.8% White, 2.7% American Indian, and 0.5% Asian. Hispanics and Latinos of any race were 0.5% of the population.

There were 85 households, of which 25.9% had children under the age of 18 living with them, 51.8% were married couples living together, 2.4% had a male householder with no wife present, 5.9% had a female householder with no husband present, and 40.0% were non-families. 36.5% of all households were made up of individuals, and 14.1% had someone living alone who was 65 years of age or older. The average household size was 2.18, and the average family size was 2.84.

In the city, the population was spread out, with 21.6% under the age of 18, 4.5% from 18 to 24, 22.6% from 25 to 44, 28.6% from 45 to 64, and 22.7% who were 65 years of age or older. The median age was 46.5 years. For every 100 females, there were 98.9 males. For every 100 females age 18 and over, there were 90.8 males age 18 and over.

The median income for a household in the city was $36,250, and the median income for a family was $36,000. Males had a median income of $43,438 versus $37,708 for females. The per capita income for the city was $18,126. 8.3% of families and 20.6% of the population were below the poverty line, including 36.8% of those under the age 18 and 0.0% of those age 65 or over.

== Economy ==
As of 2012, 64.8% of the population over the age of 16 was in the labor force. 0.0% was in the armed forces, and 64.8% was in the civilian labor force with 55.7% being employed and 9.0% unemployed. The composition, by occupation, of the employed civilian labor force was: 35.3% in management, business, science, and arts; 22.1% in sales and office occupations; 16.2% in service occupations; 13.2% in natural resources, construction, and maintenance; and 13.2% in production, transportation, and material moving. The three industries employing the largest percentages of the working civilian labor force were: agriculture, forestry, fishing and hunting, and mining (27.9%); educational services, and health care and social assistance (26.5%); and manufacturing (14.7%).

The cost of living in Dorrance is relatively low; compared to a U.S. average of 100, the cost of living index for the community is 79.2. As of 2012, the median home value in the city was $51,300, and the median selected monthly owner cost was $656 for housing units with a mortgage and $304 for those without.

== Government ==
Dorrance is a city of the third class with a mayor-council form of government. The city council consists of five members, and it meets on the second Saturday of each month.

Dorrance lies within Kansas's 1st U.S. Congressional District. For the purposes of representation in the Kansas Legislature, the city is located in the 36th district of the Kansas Senate and the 109th district of the Kansas House of Representatives.

== Education ==
The community is served by Central Plains USD 112 public school district. Students attend schools in Wilson.

Dorrance schools were closed through school unification. The Dorrance Cardinals won the Kansas State High School boys class BB basketball championship in 1956.

== Infrastructure ==
=== Transportation ===
Interstate 70 and U.S. Route 40 run concurrently east–west less than a mile north of the city. The old alignment of U.S. 40 runs southeast–northwest through Dorrance, intersecting 200th Boulevard, a paved county road formerly designated K-231, which runs north–south along the city's eastern edge.

Union Pacific Railroad operates a freight rail line, its Kansas Pacific (KP) line, through Dorrance. The line runs southeast–northwest through the community, parallel to the old alignment of U.S. 40.

=== Utilities ===
Western Electric provides electricity to local residents. H & B Communications provides landline telephone service and offers cable television and internet access. Most residents use natural gas for heating fuel; service is provided by Midwest Energy, Inc.

== Media ==
Dorrance is in the Wichita-Hutchinson, Kansas television market.

== Culture ==
=== Points of interest ===
The Dorrance Historical Society Museum, located downtown, exhibits artifacts from the community's history.

=== In popular culture and the arts ===
Dorrance was among the filming locations for the 1973 film Paper Moon.

Toss Back, the company which invented and first produced the "Snap Back" rim used in NBA basketball, was located in Dorrance.
