= Norcatur, Kansas =

City in Decatur County, Kansas

- City
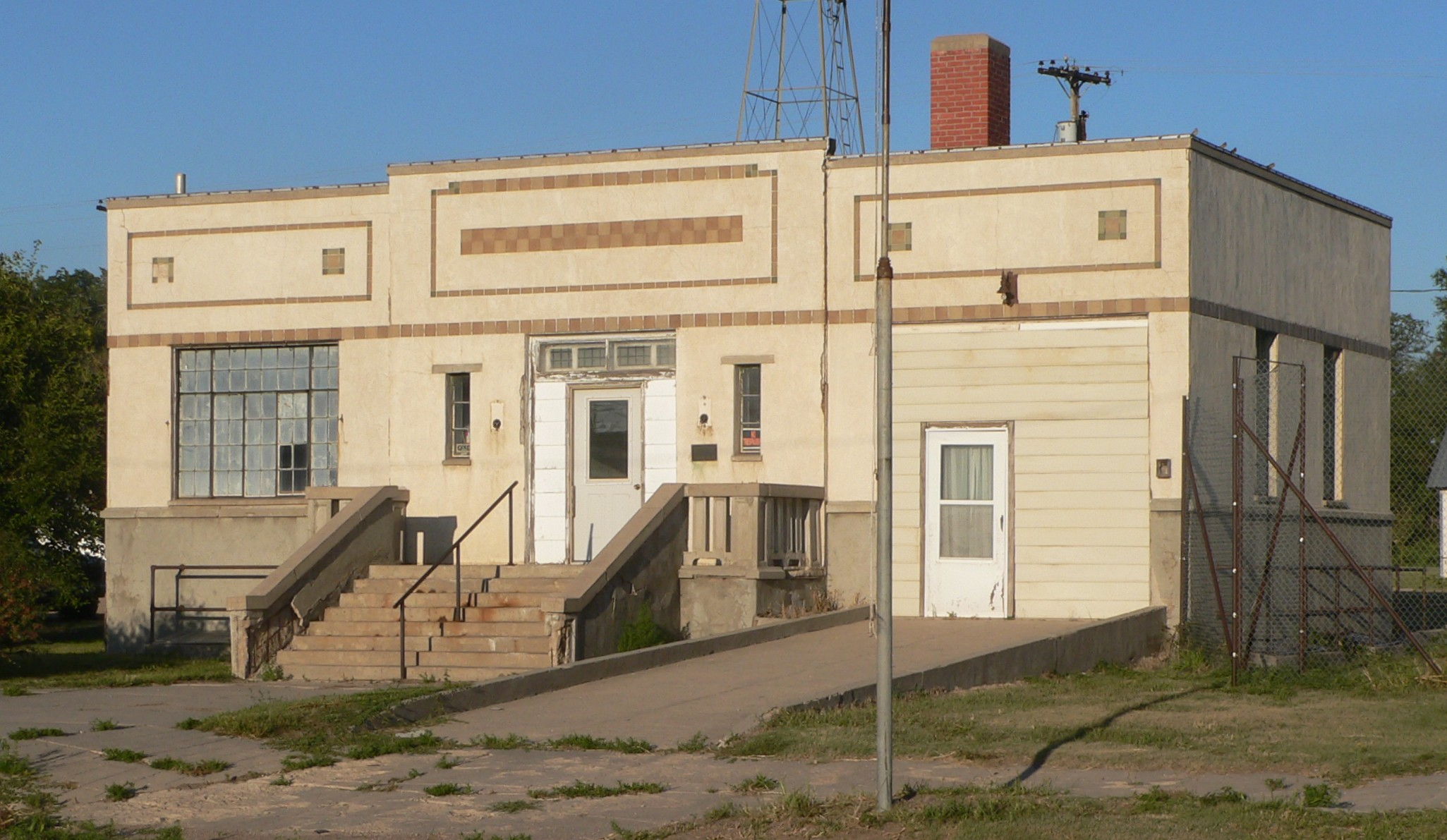
- Norcatur's 1937 city hall is listed in the National Register of Historic Places

- Location within Decatur County and Kansas

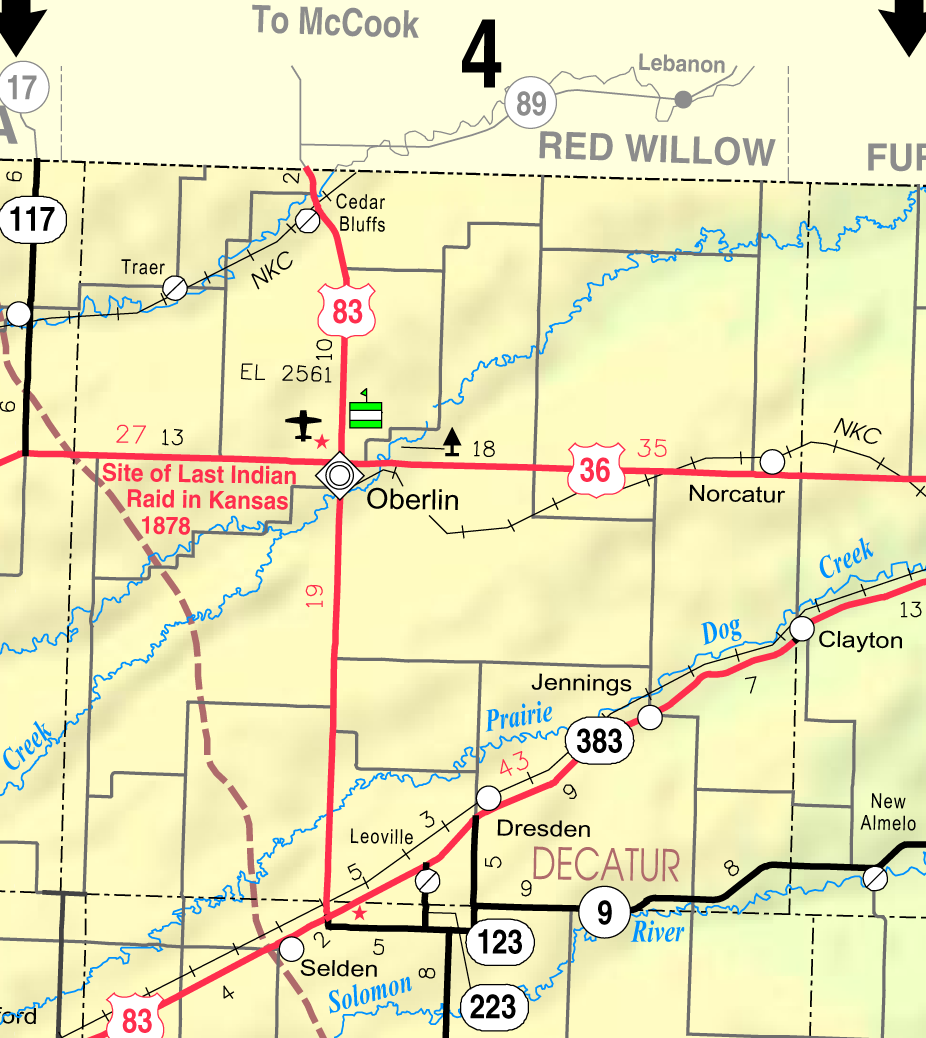
- KDOT map of Decatur County (legend)
- Coordinates: 39°50′11″N 100°11′18″W
- Country: United States
- State: Kansas
- County: Decatur
- Township: Lincoln
- Founded: 1885
- Incorporated: 1901
- Named for: Norton and Decatur counties

Area
  - Total: 1.00 sq mi (2.58 km^{2})
  - Land: 1.00 sq mi (2.58 km^{2})
  - Water: 0 sq mi (0.00 km^{2})
- Elevation: 2,644 ft (806 m)

Population (2020)
  - Total: 159
  - Density: 160/sq mi (61.6/km^{2})
- Time zone: UTC-6 (CST)
  - Summer (DST): UTC-5 (CDT)
- ZIP Code: 67653
- Area code: 785
- FIPS code: 20-50925
- GNIS ID: 471026
- Website: City website

Norcatur is a city in Decatur County, Kansas, United States. As of the 2020 census, the population of the city was 159.

== History ==
Norcatur was founded in 1885 near the Nebraska border. Norcatur was named from its location near the border between Norton and Decatur counties. The first post office in Norcatur was established in October, 1885.

== Geography ==
Norcatur is located at 39°50′11″N 100°11′18″W (39.836514, -100.188402). According to the United States Census Bureau, the city has a total area of 0.99 square miles (2.56 km^{2}), all land.

== Demographics ==
Historical population
Census	Pop.	Note	%±
1910	482		—
1920	476		−1.2%
1930	524		10.1%
1940	440		−16.0%
1950	368		−16.4%
1960	302		−17.9%
1970	284		−6.0%
1980	226		−20.4%
1990	198		−12.4%
2000	169		−14.6%
2010	151		−10.7%
2020	159		5.3%
U.S. Decennial Census

=== 2020 census ===
The 2020 United States census counted 159 people, 65 households, and 33 families in Norcatur. The population density was 159.6 per square mile (61.6/km^{2}). There were 93 housing units at an average density of 93.4 per square mile (36.1/km^{2}). The racial makeup was 93.71% (149) white or European American (89.31% non-Hispanic white), 0.0% (0) black or African-American, 0.0% (0) Native American or Alaska Native, 0.0% (0) Asian, 0.0% (0) Pacific Islander or Native Hawaiian, 0.0% (0) from other races, and 6.29% (10) from two or more races. Hispanic or Latino of any race was 5.66% (9) of the population.

Of the 65 households, 26.2% had children under the age of 18; 44.6% were married couples living together; 16.9% had a female householder with no spouse or partner present. 44.6% of households consisted of individuals and 27.7% had someone living alone who was 65 years of age or older. The average household size was 1.9 and the average family size was 2.3. The percent of those with a bachelor's degree or higher was estimated to be 24.5% of the population.

25.8% of the population was under the age of 18, 3.1% from 18 to 24, 22.0% from 25 to 44, 27.0% from 45 to 64, and 22.0% who were 65 years of age or older. The median age was 44.3 years. For every 100 females, there were 80.7 males. For every 100 females ages 18 and older, there were 81.5 males.

The 2016–2020 5-year American Community Survey estimates show that the median household income was $58,452 (with a margin of error of +/- $13,349) and the median family income was $71,563 (+/- $20,272). Males had a median income of $40,417 (+/- $6,546) versus $23,750 (+/- $7,957) for females. The median income for those above 16 years old was $34,063 (+/- $10,056). Approximately, 0.0% of families and 8.7% of the population were below the poverty line, including 0.0% of those under the age of 18 and 24.1% of those ages 65 or over.

=== 2010 census ===
As of the census of 2010, there were 151 people, 74 households, and 40 families living in the city. The population density was 152.5 inhabitants per square mile (58.9/km^{2}). There were 101 housing units at an average density of 102.0 per square mile (39.4/km^{2}). The racial makeup of the city was 98.7% White and 1.3% from two or more races. Hispanic or Latino of any race were 2.0% of the population.

There were 74 households, of which 12.2% had children under the age of 18 living with them, 43.2% were married couples living together, 6.8% had a female householder with no husband present, 4.1% had a male householder with no wife present, and 45.9% were non-families. 40.5% of all households were made up of individuals, and 13.6% had someone living alone who was 65 years of age or older. The average household size was 2.04 and the average family size was 2.73.

The median age in the city was 51.3 years. 17.9% of residents were under the age of 18; 7.2% were between the ages of 18 and 24; 14.6% were from 25 to 44; 33.8% were from 45 to 64; and 26.5% were 65 years of age or older. The gender makeup of the city was 56.3% male and 43.7% female.

== Education ==
The community is served by Oberlin USD 294 public school district. Norcatur schools were closed in school unification. The Norcatur High School mascot was Norcatur Cardinals.

== Notable people ==
- Dewey Adkins, Major League Baseball player
- Elden Auker, Major League Baseball pitcher
