= Paradise Water Tower =

- U.S. National Register of Historic Places
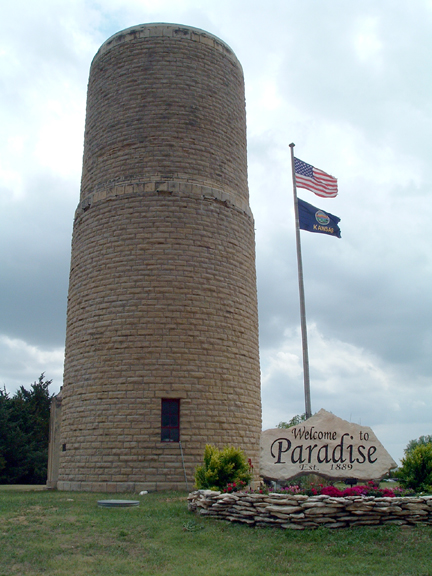

- Location within Kansas Location within the United States
- Location: E of int. of Waldo and Main Sts., Paradise, Kansas
- Coordinates: 39°7′5″N 98°54′56″W
- Area: less than one acre
- Built: 1938
- Built by: WPA
- Architectural style: Art Deco, WPA Rustic
- NRHP reference No.: 06001242
- Added to NRHP: January 17, 2007

The Paradise Water Tower, of Paradise, Kansas, United States, is a historic Works Progress Administration project of 1938. It is located east of the intersection of Waldo and Main Sts. in Paradise. The tower was designed in the WPA Rustic style and features an Art Deco limestone entrance surround. It was listed on the National Register of Historic Places in 2007.

It is a 17-foot diameter rusticated limestone tower that rises 35 feet and can hold up to 58,000 gallons of water.
