= Chautauqua County Courthouse (Kansas) =

Building in Sedan, Kansas, US

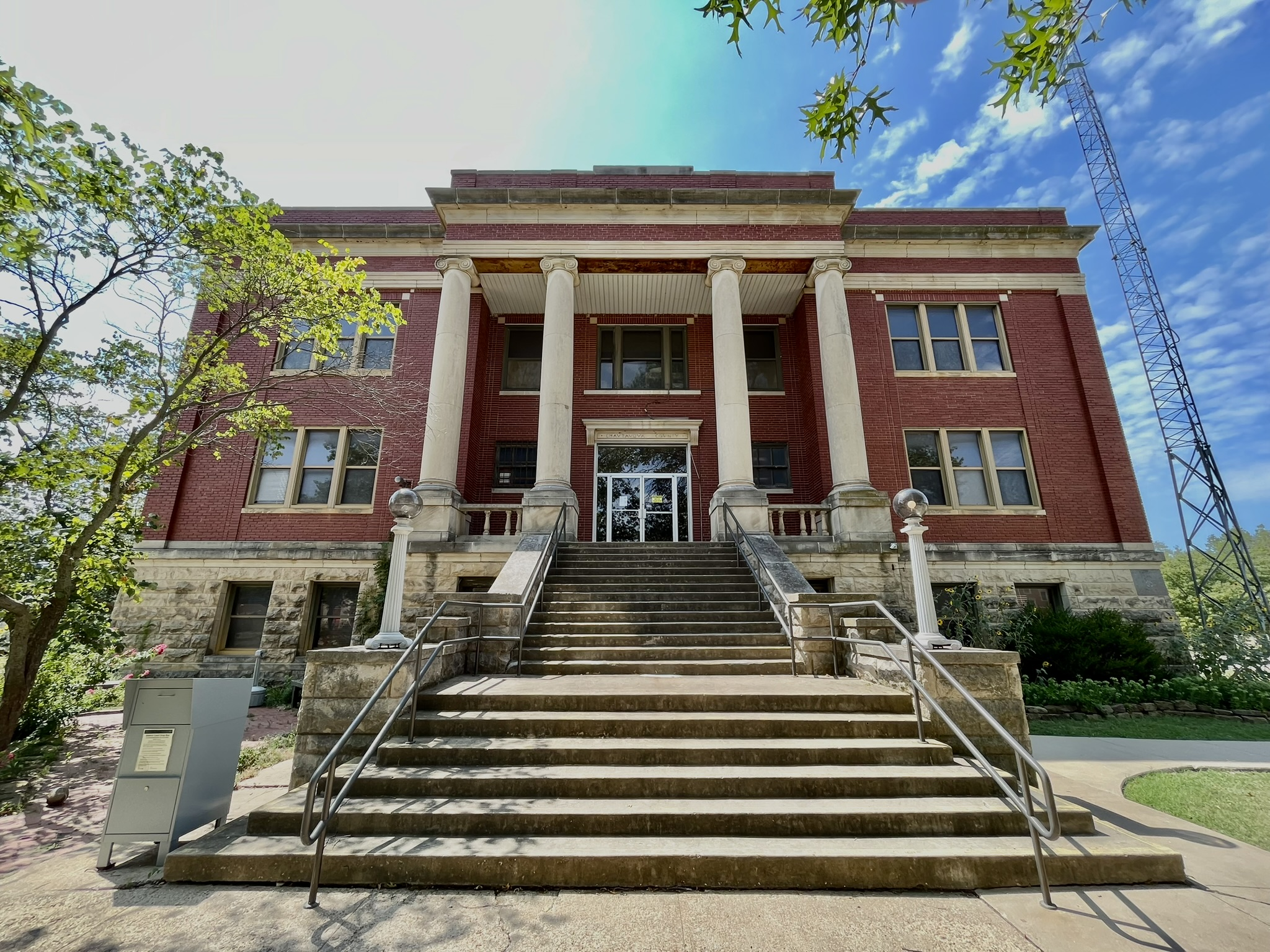

- Location within Kansas Location within the United States

General information
- Architectural style: Classical Revival
- Location: 215 North Chautauqua Street, Sedan, Kansas
- Coordinates: 37°7′41″N 96°11′12″W
- Construction started: 1917
- Completed: 1918

Design and construction
- Architects: George P. Washburn & Sons
- Main contractor: Louis Fred Nebelong

The Chautauqua County Courthouse, located at 215 North Chautauqua Street in Sedan, is the seat of government of Chautauqua County, Kansas. Sedan has been the county seat since 1875. The courthouse was built from 1917 to 1918 by contractor Louis Fred Nebelong.

Architect George P. Washburn & Sons of Ottawa, Kansas, designed the courthouse in the Classical Revival style. The courthouse is two stories and faces east. It is constructed of red-colored brick, limestone, and concrete with a flat roof. It is located on spacious landscaped grounds in the center of the city. The front has a portico supported by four Ionic columns which rise to a wide header at the roof. A horizontal line of light-colored limestone directly above the windows of the second floor marks the entire circumference of the building.

The current courthouse is the second structure used as a courthouse. The first courthouse was a stone, two-story structure built in 1875–1877 by H. B. Kelly.

George P. Washburn & Sons also designed courthouses in Anderson County, Atchison County, Butler County, Doniphan County, Franklin County, Harper County, Kingman County, Miami County, Pratt County and Woodson County, and Beaver County, Oklahoma.

== See also ==
- List of county courthouses in Kansas
