= National Register of Historic Places listings in Franklin County, Kansas =

Location of Franklin County in Kansas

This is a list of the National Register of Historic Places listings in Franklin County, Kansas.

This is intended to be a complete list of the properties and districts on the National Register of Historic Places in Franklin County, Kansas, United States. The locations of National Register properties and districts for which the latitude and longitude coordinates are included below, may be seen in a map.

There are 21 properties and districts listed on the National Register in the county.

This National Park Service list is complete through NPS recent listings posted April 3, 2026.

== Current listings ==
	Name on the Register	Image	Date listed	Location	City or town	Description
1	Appanoose Church of the Brethren and Cemetery	Appanoose Church of the Brethren and Cemetery	September 14, 2018 (#100002965)	492 Woodson & 196 N 1 Rds. 38°44′20″N 95°27′49″W	Overbrook vicinity	The church is in Franklin County and the cemetery is in Douglas County.
2	Dietrich Cabin	Dietrich Cabin	February 23, 1972 (#72000500)	Ottawa City Park; 38°36′39″N 95°16′03″W	Ottawa	In 1857 a German immigrant settled three miles south and two and one-fourth miles west of the present town of Princeton; in 1859, he built this cabin on a hill overlooking the Humboldt trail to replace the original cabin which was destroyed in a prairie fire.
3	Downtown Ottawa Historic District	Downtown Ottawa Historic District	June 29, 1972 (#72000501)	East side of S. Main St. from No. 135 to 3rd St. 38°36′54″N 95°16′05″W	Ottawa	All remaining building are contributing resources for the Historic Ottawa Central Business District.
4	Eight Mile Creek Warren Truss Bridge	Eight Mile Creek Warren Truss Bridge	May 9, 2003 (#03000374)	Osborne Terrace, 0.2 miles west of intersection with Eisenhower Terrace, 1.0 mile west of Main St. 38°37′52″N 95°17′08″W	Ottawa	
5	Franklin County Courthouse	Franklin County Courthouse	March 17, 1972 (#72000502)	Main St. 38°36′48″N 95°16′03″W	Ottawa	
6	Judge James Hanway House	Judge James Hanway House	December 11, 2008 (#08001173)	658 Virginia Rd. 38°25′52″N 95°05′03″W	Lane	
7	Historic Ottawa Central Business District	Historic Ottawa Central Business District	February 7, 2008 (#06000622)	Roughly bounded by Marias des Cygnes River, S. 5th St., Walnut St., and Hickory St. 38°36′54″N 95°16′07″W	Ottawa	
8	Tauy Jones Hall	Tauy Jones Hall	June 14, 1982 (#82002659)	Ottawa University campus, 10th and Cedar Sts. 38°36′14″N 95°15′47″W	Ottawa	
9	Tauy Jones House	Tauy Jones House	June 19, 1972 (#72000503)	3 miles northeast of Ottawa on Tauy Creek; 38°39′51″N 95°13′14″W	Ottawa	
10	Middle Creek Tributary Bridge	Middle Creek Tributary Bridge	July 2, 1985 (#85001428)	5.8 miles west of Princeton; 38°29′32″N 95°22′33″W	Princeton	
11	Old Santa Fe Railroad Depot	Old Santa Fe Railroad Depot	March 1, 1973 (#73000755)	135 W. Tecumseh St. 38°37′14″N 95°16′09″W	Ottawa	
12	Ottawa High School and Junior High School	Ottawa High School and Junior High School	October 6, 2000 (#00001188)	526 and 506 S. Main St. 38°36′37″N 95°16′07″W	Ottawa	
13	Ottawa Library	Ottawa Library	December 1, 1980 (#80001465)	5th and Main Sts. 38°36′15″N 95°15′43″W	Ottawa	
14	Pleasant Valley School District #2	Pleasant Valley School District #2	February 26, 2004 (#04000078)	2905 Thomas Rd. 38°43′27″N 95°08′48″W	Wellsville	
15	James H. Ransom House	James H. Ransom House	November 21, 1974 (#74000836)	318 S. Locust St. 38°36′49″N 95°16′17″W	Ottawa	
16	Lyman Reid House	Lyman Reid House	January 11, 2017 (#100000508)	306 Elm St. 38°36′51″N 95°16′22″W	Ottawa	
17	Silkville	Silkville	December 15, 1972 (#72000504)	2.5 miles southwest of Williamsburg on U.S. Route 50; 38°26′25″N 95°29′13″W	Williamsburg	
18	Tauy Baptist Church	Tauy Baptist Church	October 15, 2024 (#100010891)	4097 Nevada Road; 38°40′51″N 95°12′41″W	Ottawa	
19	Tauy Creek Bridge	Tauy Creek Bridge	October 25, 1990 (#90001567)	Over Tauy Creek, north of Interstate 35; 38°39′53″N 95°13′23″W	Ottawa	
20	Walnut Creek Bridge	Walnut Creek Bridge	July 2, 1985 (#85001445)	Off K-33, 1 mile south of Wellsville; 38°41′18″N 95°05′05″W	Wellsville	
21	Wellsville Bank Building	Wellsville Bank Building	October 24, 1991 (#91001519)	418 Main St. 38°43′08″N 95°04′55″W	Wellsville	The Wellsville Bank was organized on March 4, 1885 by Dr. S. F. Brooking and John Dean. They purchased Lot 9, Block 14 in September, 1884 and commenced construction on Wellsville's first brick building at 418 Main Street.

== See also ==
- List of National Historic Landmarks in Kansas
- National Register of Historic Places listings in Kansas
