= Shelley House =

Shelley House may refer to:

in England

- Shelley House (London)

in the United States (by state then city)

- Shelley House (Madison, Connecticut), listed on the National Register of Historic Places (NRHP) in New Haven County
- Shelley-Tipton House, Garnett, Kansas, listed on the NRHP in Anderson County
- William Francis Shelley House, Kansas City, Missouri, listed on the NRHP in Jackson County
- Shelley House (St. Louis, Missouri), listed on the NRHP in St. Louis
