= Walnut Creek Bridge =

Walnut Creek Bridge may refer to:

- Walnut Creek Bridge (Simmons, Arizona), listed on the National Register of Historic Places in Yavapai County, Arizona
- Walnut Creek Bridge (Heizer, Kansas), listed on the National Register of Historic Places in Barton County, Kansas
- Walnut Creek Bridge (Wellsville, Kansas), listed on the National Register of Historic Places in Franklin County, Kansas
