= George P. Washburn =

American architect (1846-1922)

George Putnam Washburn (March 21, 1846 – May 16, 1922) was a prominent architect practicing in Kansas. Washburn came to Kansas in 1870, worked as a carpenter and architect, and in 1882 opened an architecture practice in Ottawa, Kansas. His son joined his firm which became George P. Washburn & Son. In 1910 George P.'s son-in-law, Roy Stookey, joined the firm, and George P. retired. After George P. died in 1922 the firm became Washburn & Stookey.

Washburn designed nine Carnegie library buildings in Kansas, and is most known for the 13 courthouses he designed. A number of his buildings are listed on the U.S. National Register of Historic Places, with several of the libraries being listed under one study.

Works (with attribution variations) include:

- Anderson County Courthouse, 4th and Oak Sts., Garnett, Kansas (Washburn, George P.), built 1902, Romanesque style, NRHP-listed
- Atchison County Courthouse, SW corner of 5th and Parallel Sts., Atchison, Kansas (Washburn, George P.), NRHP-listed
- Burlington Carnegie Free Library, 201 N. Third, Burlington, Kansas (Washburn, George P., & Son), NRHP-listed
- Butler County Courthouse, 205 W. Central Ave., El Dorado, Kansas (Washburn, George P. & Sons), NRHP-listed
- Chautauqua County Courthouse, 215 North Chautauqua Street, Sedan, Kansas
- Cherryvale Carnegie Free Library, 329 E. Main, Cherryvale, Kansas (Washburn, George P., & Son), NRHP-listed
- Columbus Public Carnegie Library, 205 N. Kansas, Columbus, Kansas (Washburn, George P., & Son), NRHP-listed
- Doniphan County Courthouse, Courthouse Sq., bounded by Walnut, Liberty, Chestnut, and Main Sts., Troy, Kansas (Washburn, George P. & Sons), NRHP-listed
- Eureka Carnegie Library, 520 N. Main, Eureka, Kansas (Washburn, George P., Co.), NRHP-listed
- Franklin County Courthouse, Main St., Ottawa, Kansas (Washburn, George P.), NRHP-listed
- Harper County Courthouse, 200 N. Jennings Ave., Anthony, Kansas (Washburn, George P.), NRHP-listed
- Jackson Hotel, 139 W. Peoria St., Paola, Kansas (Washburn, George P.), NRHP-listed
- Kingman County Courthouse, 120 Spruce St., Kingman, Kansas (Washburn, George P.), NRHP-listed
- Miami County Courthouse, E of jct. of Miami and Silver Sts., Paola, Kansas (Washburn, George P.), NRHP-listed
- Ottawa High School and Junior High School, 526 and 506 S. Main St., Ottawa, Kansas (Washburn, George P. & Son), NRHP-listed
- Ottawa Library, 5th and Main Sts., Ottawa, Kansas (Washburn, George P.), NRHP-listed
- Sennett and Bertha Kirk House, 145 W. Fourth Ave., Garnett, Kansas, (Washburn, George P. & Son), NRHP-listed
- Sterling Free Public Carnegie Library, 132 N. Broadway, Sterling, Kansas (Washburn, George P., & Son), NRHP-listed
- Woodson County Courthouse, Courthouse Sq. between Main, Rutledge, State, and Butler Sts., Yates Center, Kansas (Washburn, George P.), NRHP-listed
- One or more works in Historic Ottawa Central Business District, roughly bounded by Marias des Cygnes R., S 5th St., Walnut St. and Hickory St., Ottawa, Kansas (Washburn, George P.), NRHP-listed
- Gardner Masonic Temple, 105 1/2 S. Elm St., Gardner, Kansas, built in 1907 after the original structure burned down.
