= Anderson County Courthouse =

Anderson County Courthouse may refer to:

- Anderson County Courthouse (Kansas), Garnett, Kansas
- Anderson County Courthouse (South Carolina), part of the Anderson Downtown Historic District (Anderson, South Carolina)
- Anderson County Courthouse (Texas), Palestine, Texas
