= Miami County Courthouse =

Miami County Courthouse may refer to:

- Miami County Courthouse (Indiana), Peru, Indiana
- Miami County Courthouse (Kansas), Paola, Kansas
- Miami County Courthouse (Ohio), Troy, Ohio
