= Woodson County Courthouse =

- U.S. National Register of Historic Places
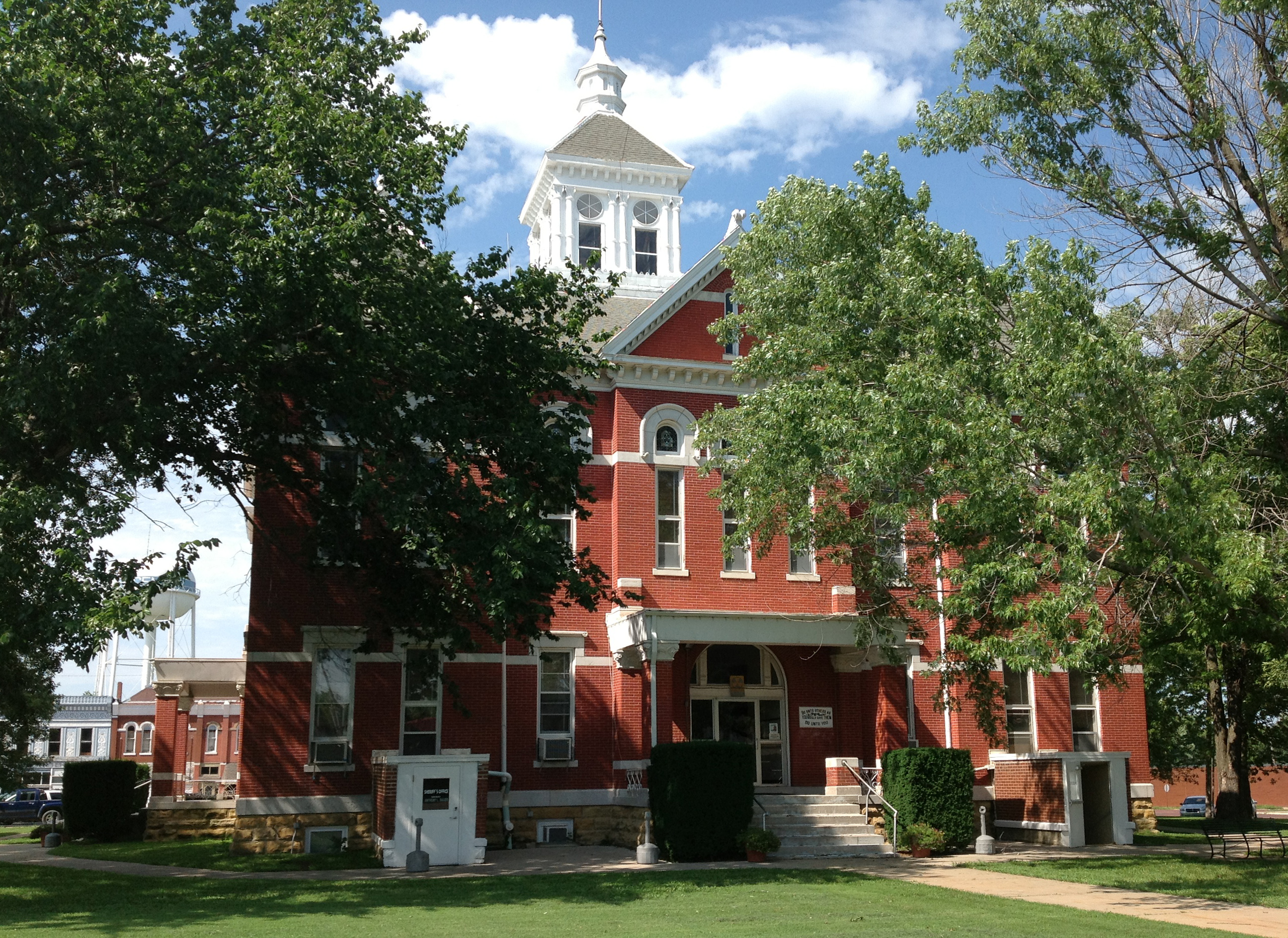
- Woodson County, Kansas Courthouse

- Location within Kansas Location within the United States
- Interactive map showing the location of Woodson County Courthouse
- Location: Courthouse Sq. between Main, Rutledge, State, and Butler Sts., Yates Center, Kansas
- Coordinates: 37°52′54″N 95°43′58″W
- Area: 2.5 acres (1.0 ha)
- Built: 1899–1900
- Built by: Brewster, J.W.
- Architect: George P. Washburn;
- Architectural style: Late Victorian
- NRHP reference No.: 85002951
- Added to NRHP: October 10, 1985

The Woodson County Courthouse, located in Courthouse Square in Yates Center, serves as the administrative hub of Woodson County, Kansas. Established by the territorial legislature in 1857, Woodson County initially designated Neosho Falls as its inaugural county seat. However, between 1865 and 1875, the county seat underwent multiple relocations, shifting back and forth between Neosho Falls and Kalida, then to Defiance, before ultimately settling in 1876 at the newly established Yates Center, strategically positioned at the heart of the county.

Built from 1899 to 1900, the courthouse was the second in Yates Center and replaced a wooden building moved to the city from Defiance. Architect George P. Washburn, who designed thirteen county courthouses in Kansas, designed the building; its design is similar to Washburn's Kingman County Courthouse. The brick courthouse sits on a limestone base and has a Late Victorian design which includes elements of the Romanesque Revival, Queen Anne, and Free Classical styles. The building is topped by four corner towers and a central cupola. Three of the courthouse's four entrances feature arched doorways surrounded by porches, while the north entrance has a large limestone arch around the doorway and no porch. The first and second floor windows are rectangular, while the attic windows are arched and sit atop the second floor windows; all sets of windows are connected by stone bands encircling the building.

The courthouse was added to the National Register of Historic Places on October 10, 1985. It is part of the Yates Center Courthouse Square Historic District, which is also on the National Register.
