= Atchison County Courthouse (Kansas) =

- U.S. National Register of Historic Places
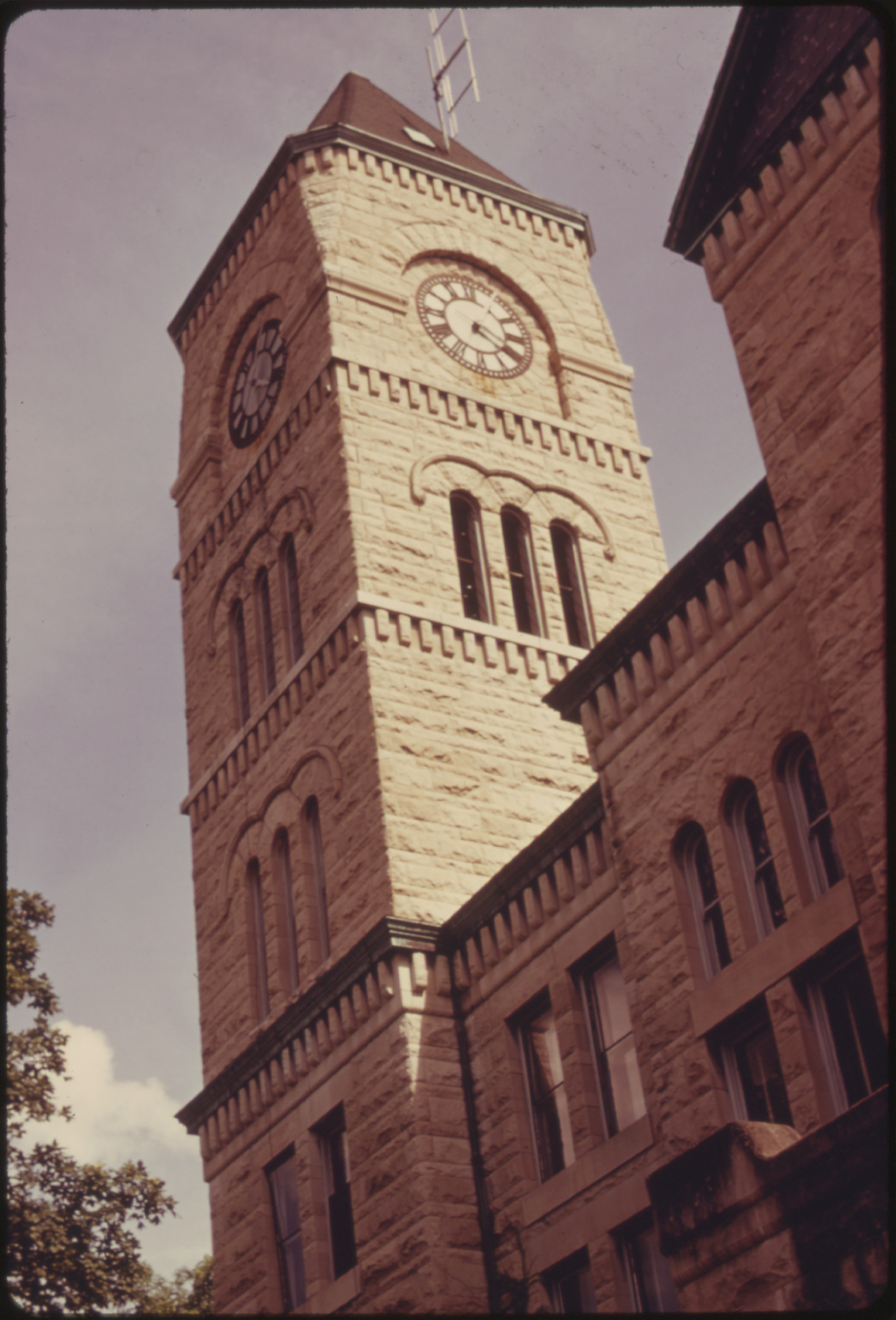
- The courthouse's clock tower in 1974

- Location within Kansas Location within the United States
- Interactive map showing the location of Atchison County Courthouse
- Location: SW corner of 5th and Parallel Sts., Atchison, Kansas
- Coordinates: 39°33′58″N 95°7′10″W
- Area: 1.5 acres (0.61 ha)
- Built: 1896–97
- Built by: Latimer & Benning
- Architect: Washburn, George P.
- Architectural style: Romanesque
- NRHP reference No.: 75000704
- Added to NRHP: April 16, 1975

The Atchison County Courthouse, located at the southwest corner of 5th and Parallel Streets in Atchison, is the seat of government of Atchison County, Kansas. The stone courthouse was built from 1896 to 1897 and replaced the county's first courthouse, which had been built in 1859. County officials wanted the courthouse to resemble the Franklin County Courthouse in Ottawa, so they hired that building's architect, George P. Washburn, to design the new courthouse. Washburn designed the building in the Romanesque Revival style. The courthouse's design features four corner towers, including a seven-story clock tower. The main entrance to the courthouse has a porch within a large arch; the doorway is contained in a smaller arch. The building has a hip roof with intersecting gable dormers; the towers have pyramidal roofs.

The courthouse was added to the National Register of Historic Places on April 16, 1975.
