= Jackson Hotel (Paola, Kansas) =

- U.S. National Register of Historic Places
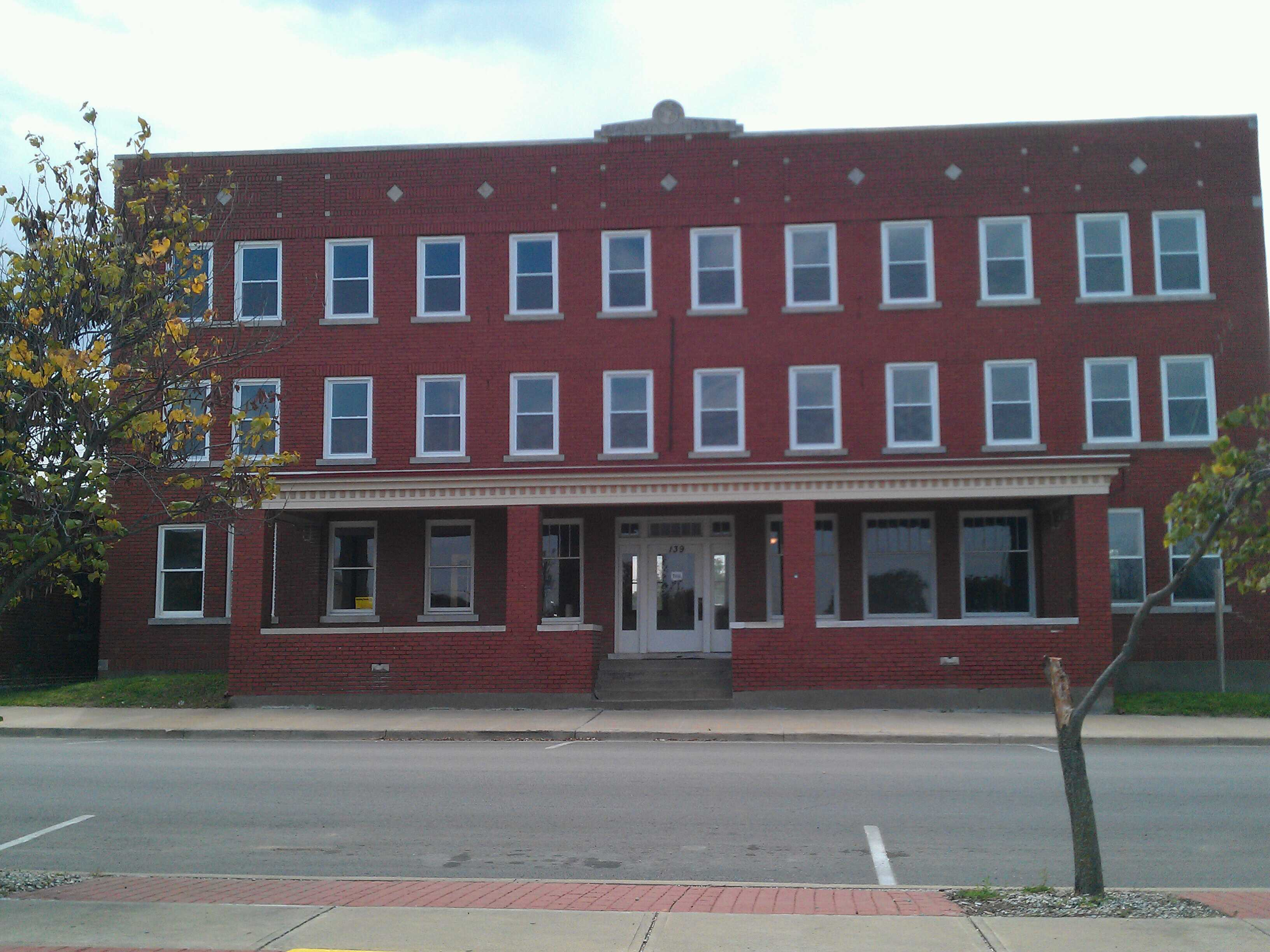

- Location within Kansas Location within the United States
- Location: 139 W. Peoria St., Paola, Kansas
- Coordinates: 38°34′22″N 94°52′47″W
- Area: less than one acre
- Built: 1921
- Built by: Freese Construction
- Architect: Washburn, George P.
- Architectural style: Commercial
- NRHP reference No.: 08000646
- Added to NRHP: July 9, 2008

The Jackson Hotel is a historic hotel building located at 139 W. Peoria St. in Paola, Kansas. The hotel was built in 1921 on a site which had contained a hotel since 1863; the Jackson Hotel was the third hotel built at the site. Architect George P. Washburn designed the hotel in the Commercial style. The hotel features a full-length porch on the ground floor and a front entry with a transom and sidelights, a common element of group residences of the era intended to make the building resemble a home. From 1937 to 1969, Paola business directories listed the Jackson Hotel as one of only two in the city, along with the Commercial Hotel; it became the only hotel in 1969 when the Commercial Hotel was demolished. By 1992, the hotel building had been vacated; it remained empty until a 2006 redevelopment effort.

The hotel was added to the National Register of Historic Places on July 9, 2008.
