= Doniphan County Courthouse Square Historic District =

- U.S. National Register of Historic Places
- U.S. Historic district
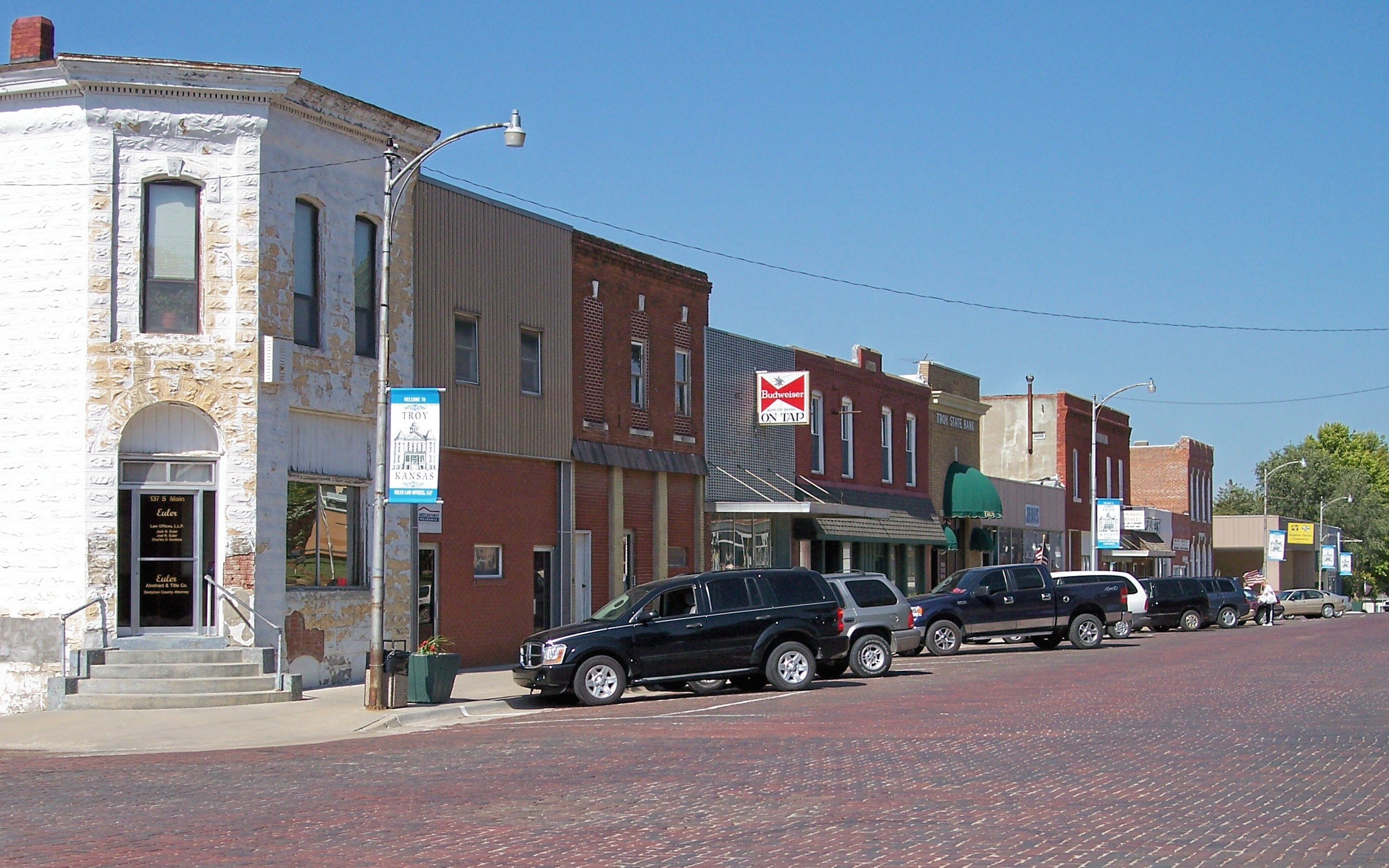

- Location within Kansas Location within the United States
- Location: Roughly bounded by E. Walnut, E Chestnut, S. Main, S. Liberty Sts., Troy, Kansas
- Coordinates: 39°47′10″N 95°05′21″W
- Area: 4.6 acres (1.9 ha)
- Built: 1899
- Architectural style: Italianate, Queen Anne
- NRHP reference No.: 02000717
- Added to NRHP: July 3, 2002

The Doniphan County Courthouse Square Historic District in Troy, Kansas is a 4.6 acres (1.9 ha) historic district which was listed on the National Register of Historic Places in 2002. It is roughly bounded by E. Walnut, E Chestnut, S. Main, and S. Liberty Streets. The district included 17 contributing buildings and one contributing site.

It includes Italianate and Queen Anne architecture.

Its contributing buildings include:

- Doniphan County Courthouse (1906), which was previously separately listed on the National Register.
- Cyrus Leland Store Building (1911), 102 E. Walnut
- McClellan Mercantile Building (1900), 120 E. Walnut
- Mabel Perry Campbell House (c.1912), 115 E. Chestnut
- Sol Miller Building (c.1870), 101 S. Main
- Boder Brothers Bank/First National Bank (1872), 137 S. Main
