= Sterling Free Public Carnegie Library =

- U.S. National Register of Historic Places
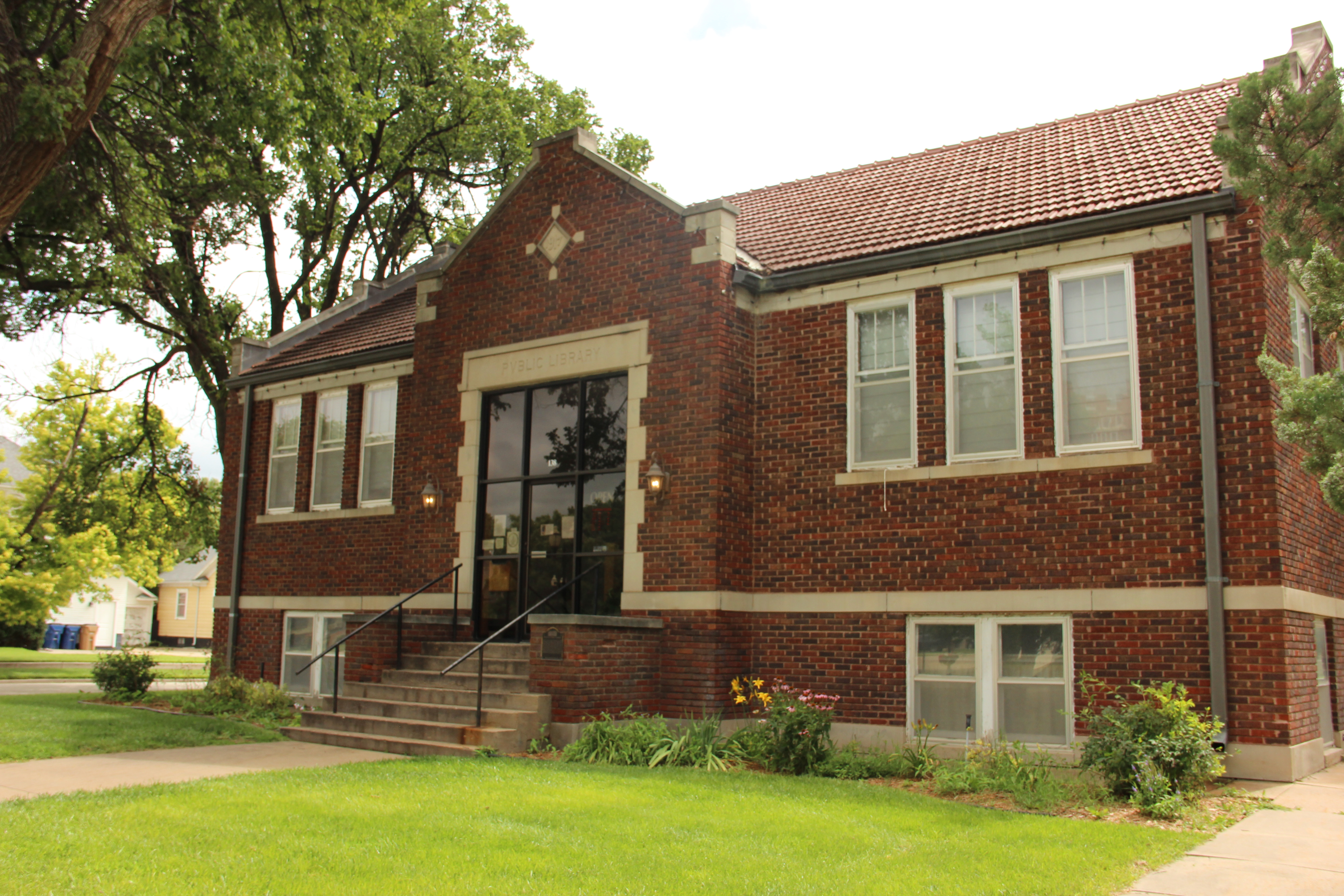
- Library in 2025

- Location within Kansas Location within the United States
- Location: 132 N. Broadway, Sterling, Kansas
- Coordinates: 38.21078°N 98.20667°W
- Area: less than one acre
- Built: 1917
- Architect: Stookey, R. W.
- Architectural style: Jacobethan
- MPS: Carnegie Libraries of Kansas TR
- NRHP reference No.: 87000969
- Added to NRHP: June 25, 1987

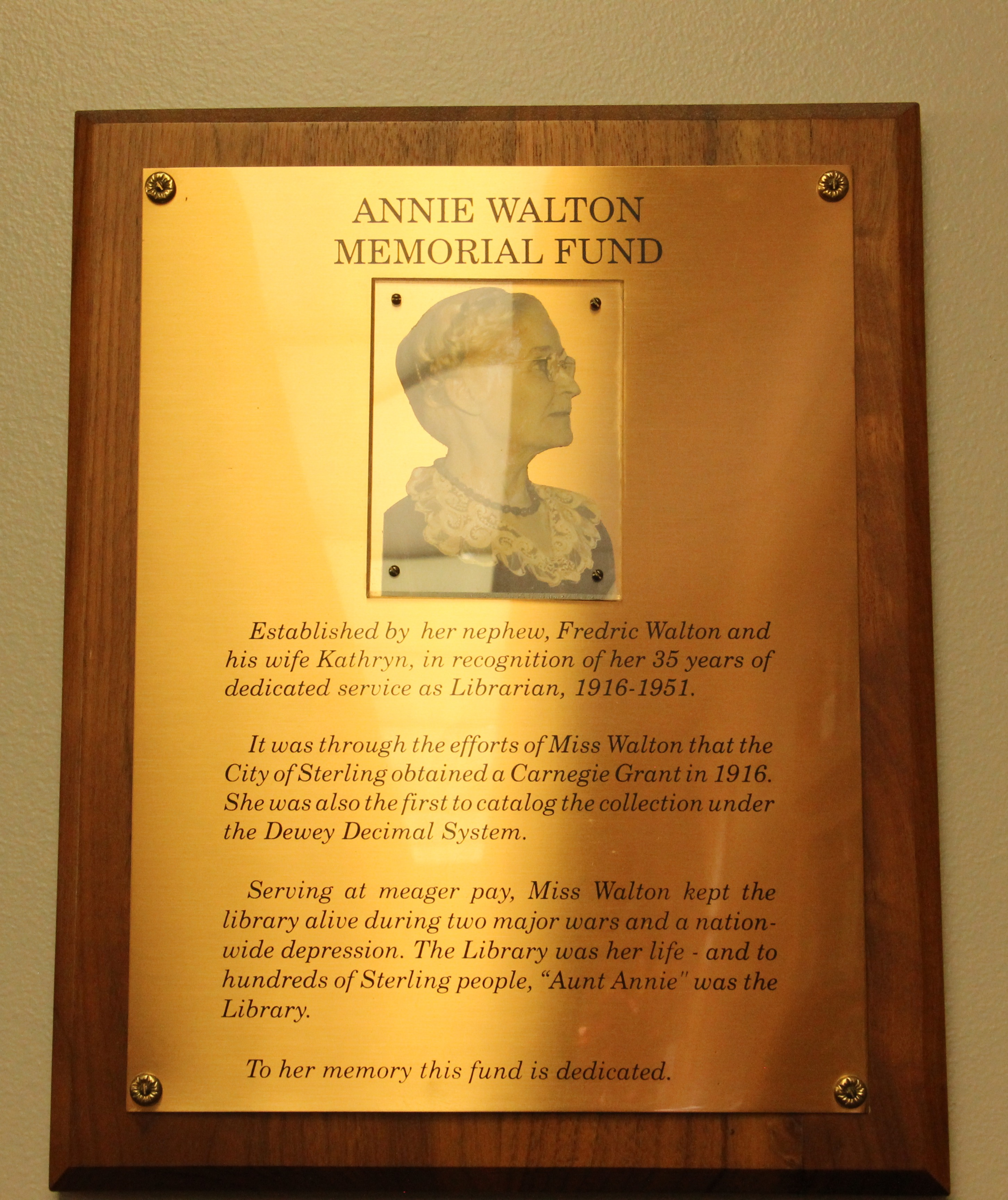
Plaque in library dedicated to librarian Anne Walton

The Sterling Free Public Carnegie Library is a Carnegie library located at 132 N. Broadway in Sterling, Kansas, United States. The library was built in 1916 through a $10,000 grant from the Carnegie Foundation and housed Sterling's library association, which formed in 1902. Architect R. W. Stookey of George P. Washburn & Co. designed the library in the Jacobethan style. The one-story red brick building features a cross gable roof. The main entrance is in a projecting gabled pavilion; its doorway has a quoined limestone surround. The frieze over the doorway and a date tablet in the entrance's gable are also made of limestone.

The library was added to the National Register of Historic Places on June 25, 1987.
