= Cherryvale Carnegie Free Library =

Library in Kansas, U.S.

- U.S. National Register of Historic Places
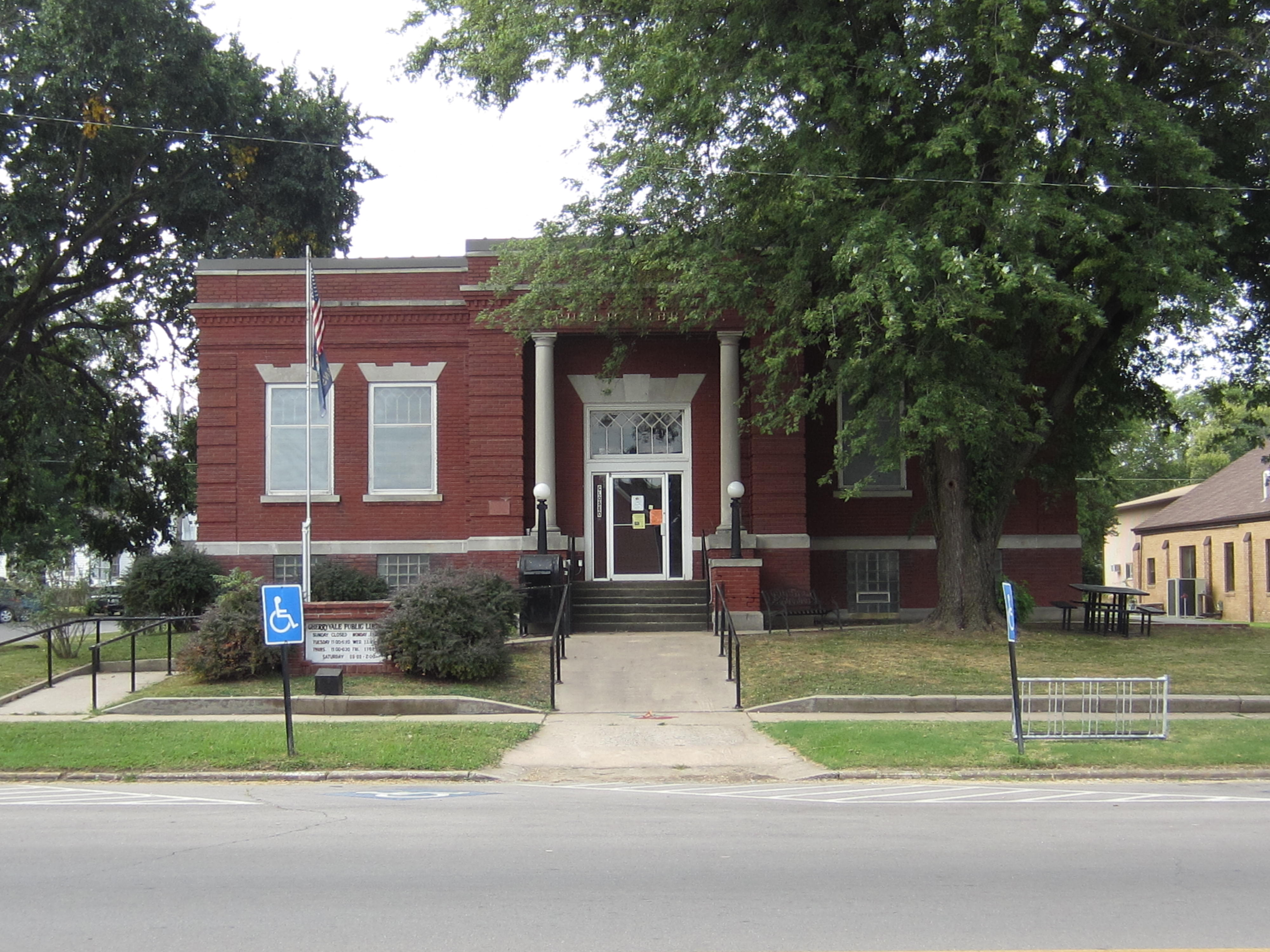
- Cherryvale Carnegie Free Library in 2013

- Location within Kansas Location within the United States
- Location: 329 E. Main, Cherryvale, Kansas
- Coordinates: 37°16′1″N 95°32′55″W
- Area: less than one acre
- Built: 1913
- Built by: Caddo Construction
- Architect: Washburn, George P., & Son
- Architectural style: Classical Revival
- MPS: Carnegie Libraries of Kansas TR
- NRHP reference No.: 87000961
- Added to NRHP: August 18, 1987

The Cherryvale Carnegie Free Library is a Carnegie library located at 329 E. Main in Cherryvale, Kansas. The library was built in 1913 through a $10,000 grant from the Carnegie Foundation. Architect George P. Washburn, who also designed eight other Carnegie libraries in Kansas, designed the library in the Classical Revival style. The red brick library has three bays in its facade. The library's recessed entrance is a classical pavilion with a brick frieze and supporting Tuscan columns and brick pillars; the doorway is topped with a limestone lintel. The low roof of the library is surrounded by a parapet.

The library was added to the National Register of Historic Places on August 18, 1987.
