= Sennett and Bertha Kirk House =

Historic house in Kansas, United States

- U.S. National Register of Historic Places
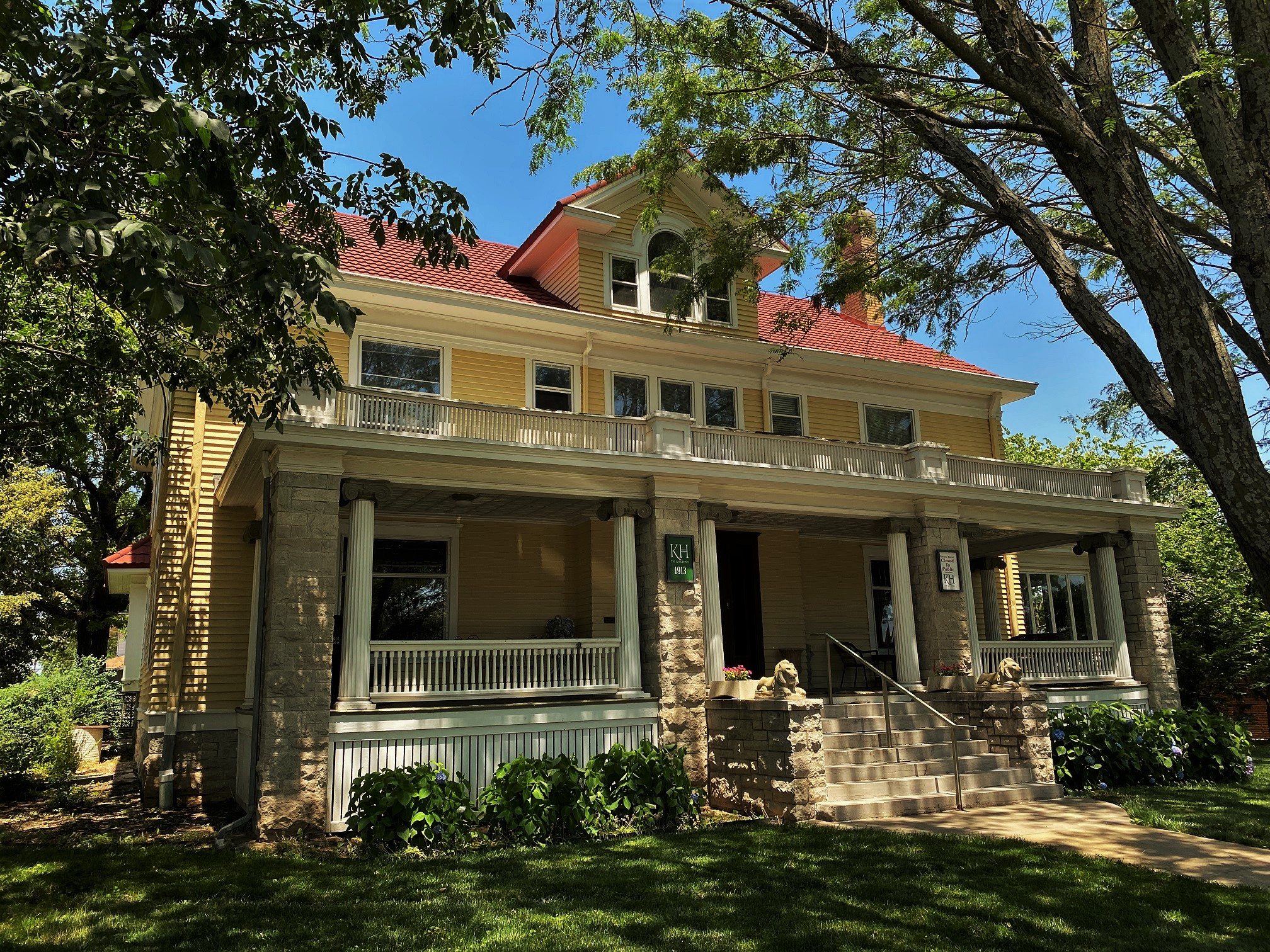
- Sennett and Bertha Kirk House in 2021

- Location within Kansas Location within the United States
- Location: 145 W. Fourth Ave. Garnett, Kansas
- Coordinates: 38°16′53″N 95°14′34″W
- Area: Less than one acre
- Built: 1913
- Architectural style: Colonial Revival
- NRHP reference No.: 05001199
- Added to NRHP: November 2, 2005

Sennett and Bertha Kirk House is a 1913 Colonial Revival house in Garnett, Kansas, United States. The house was listed on the National Register of Historic Places (NRHP) in 2005. In 2017, the house is operated as The Kirk House, a bed and breakfast.

== History ==
It was home of Sennett Kirk, a banker. The 2005 NRHP nomination states:

A banker for more than half a century, Sennett Kirk was cashier of the Garnett State Savings Bank from the time his father, Lester K, Kirk, opened it on September 6, 1889 until Sennett Kirk became bank vice-president in 1947. Sennett Kirk also served as secretary of the Garnett Mutual Loan and Savings Association organized in October 1894. The Garnett State Savings Bank moved into the northwest room of the Kirk Building in 1901.

Sennett Kirk married Bertha Mellen of Garnett on June 12, 1901 and they lived on Fourth Avenue their entire married life. Bertha was born January 11, 1873, in Greeley, Kansas, the daughter of William and Emma Mellen. She attended the University of Kansas and graduated from the Tulton and Trueblood School of Oratory in Kansas City, Missouri. She taught in the State School for the Deaf in Jacksonville, Illinois, and then in the Kansas School for the Deaf in Olathe. Bertha Mellen Kirk was a member of the Congregational Church. Sennett and Bertha Kirk's first child, Leta was born November 19, 1903. Another daughter, Bertha, was born January 4, 1906. A son, Sennett Kirk, Jr., was born September 14, 1909.

Because of their wealth, education, and social connections, the Kirks were influential in the local Garnett community. Sennett Kirk's father, the Hon. Lester K. Kirk, was elected on April 4, 1870 to be the first mayor of the city of Garnett when it was granted third class status (in Kansas this means it had a population between 2,000-5,000). When Lester Kirk died on July 4, 1902, he was known as a prominent attorney and "one of the foremost citizens of Anderson. County." He also served as county attorney, state representative and state senator. A long-time friend Manford Schoonover wrote in Kirk's obituary, "there are a score or more of men in Anderson County who owe their start in life to his help financially, and by council and friendship." Martha Lindsay Kirk, wife of L. K. Kirk, died April 7, 1908. She was well known in Garnett and Anderson County and had been prominent in social and church circles since the early days of settlement.

Bertha Kirk's father was William H. Mellen, one of the oldest and best known businessmen of Garnett and Anderson County. He taught school at Greeley in 1871 and was elected Register of Deeds of Anderson County. Mellen then finished an unexpired term as County Treasurer. His wife died in 1889, and after that time he lived with his three daughters. In an obituary September 29, 1899, William Mellen was described as "a highly educated man, a poet of merit, and a progressive man in business circles."

On July 8, 1913, the Garnett Evening Review reported,. Sennett Kirk has a force of men at work preparing to move his house to the rear of the premises preparatory to building a handsome new house of modem style and appointments." A few days later on July 16, the Review noted, "Ground was broken today for Sennett Kirk's new house. Jake Barnett and George Ashburn and their men are preparing to put in the foundations." In a front page notice July 31, "A Fine Residence," the newspaper reprinted a report from the Ottawa Herald. "George P. Washburn & Son, architects, have drawn the plans for a $15,000 residence at Garnett for Sennett Kirk of the State Savings Bank. The building will be the finest in Garnett and will be a three story structure with basement. The building will be of wood, and the plans are drawn for the most modem residence in eastern Kansas. The location will be at Fourth and Walnut, in the principal residence district of the city."

Construction of the Kirk House was associated with the development of municipal services in Garnett. The town began to supply water in 1890-1891. Streets first were paved in 1898. Gas service was developed for cooking, heating, and lighting in 1904-05 and the town began producing electricity in 1914. With the installation of electric streetlights, Fourth Avenue in front of the Kirk House became the "great white way" of Garnett and Anderson County.

After the family moved into the new house, the large and stately Colonial Revival residence became a gathering place for the community. According to local reminiscences, the Kirks often entertained high school students in their home on significant occasions with refreshments followed by entertainment such as dancing or music in the top floor "ballroom."

When Mrs. Bertha M. Kirk died intestate on September 14, 1951, the three Kirk children inherited the Kirk House. On June 15, 1957, the heirs sold the property to Herman G. and Emma S. Brandenburg. The Brandenburgs sold to Effie M. Graham on November 28, 1960. Mrs. Graham died at Kansas City, Missouri on October 23, 1970 and her son, William S. Graham inherited the property.

In March, 1988 Robert Logan and Robert Cugno purchased the property. They lived in the house and ran a successful bed and breakfast.

up to the NRHP nomination date.

After owning the property for 11 years, they sold to new owners Mike and Eileen Burns. The Graham family has loaned antiques once owned by third owner of the house Effie Graham, back to The Kirk House. Period wall coverings and décor in the Arts & Crafts motif have been used to continue to evoke a "walking back into the past" atmosphere.

== Architecture ==
The NRHP nomination states:

The Kirk House has excellent historic architectural integrity. Because its original location, contemporary setting, well-preserved design, materials, and workmanship convey a sense of the past.

The Kirk House may be the last house superintended by notable Kansas architect George P. Washburn. Presumably, George Washburn collaborated with his son, Clarence, on the design and construction of the Kirk House. The design and quality of construction for the Kirk House expressed the Kirk family's prominent social standing in the community. According to local tradition, Bertha Mellen Kirk was familiar with Washburn's work in Garnett and throughout eastern Kansas. Therefore, she wanted the "best" architect in Kansas to design her new house.

Reportedly, Mrs. Kirk wanted a more elaborate porch than originally designed so, in order to satisfy the client, the architects added metal columns with ornamental terra cotta capitals to enhance the square stone piers which actually supported the porch roof. According to another traditional story, the contractor was unable to order new quartersawn oak lumber for the interior paneling and instead acquired and reused paneling from a Chicago mansion being demolished.

The DeWolf Furniture Company with Harry Barnard as superintendent built the Kirk House. Because of their experience manufacturing store, bank, and church fixtures, the company's workers were prepared for the fine woodwork that distinguished the Kirk House. Charles Wesley Devolve established the first furniture factory in Garnett in 1887. He came to Garnett in 1872 with his two sons George and Harry Devolve and engaged in the furniture and hardware business. Charles DeWolf had a furniture store in downtown Garnett in 1885. Then on February 11, 1887, the local board of trade voted to build the walls of a building to be used as a furniture factory and production work started by July 22. Charles DeWolf left Garnett for Kansas City in 1897. When George DeWolf died in 1924, he also was credited with the development of the furniture manufacturing business in Garnett.

Local artist Paul Nordstrum painted the naturalistic murals in the Kirk House dining room. According to local tradition, these paintings were based on sketches of Anderson County landscapes suggested by Mrs. Bertha Kirk. In the April 24, 1914 Garnett Review, Nordstrum was described as an accomplished artist who had been praised in a Vernon County, Missouri, newspaper article for his decoration of the county courthouse. The report said: "the decorative skill of the artist is shown admirably, both in the harmonies and pleasing combination of colors ... throughout the building, all done in what is technically known as the New Art style, . . The two long panels on the east and west walls, at the head of the grand stairway, are filled with beautiful Missouri landscape scenes, the one on the west wall representing a landscape before civilization, and that on the east wall, the more newly-developed country."

The distinguishing architectural features of the Kirk House are representative of the Colonial Revival style and details of the interior ornamentation express the influence of the Arts and Crafts movement. The Kirk House is an excellent example of the rectangular side-gabled Colonial Revival building subtype. This sub-type was built throughout the period of popularity, but predominated after about 1910.
