= Columbus Public Carnegie Library =

- U.S. National Register of Historic Places
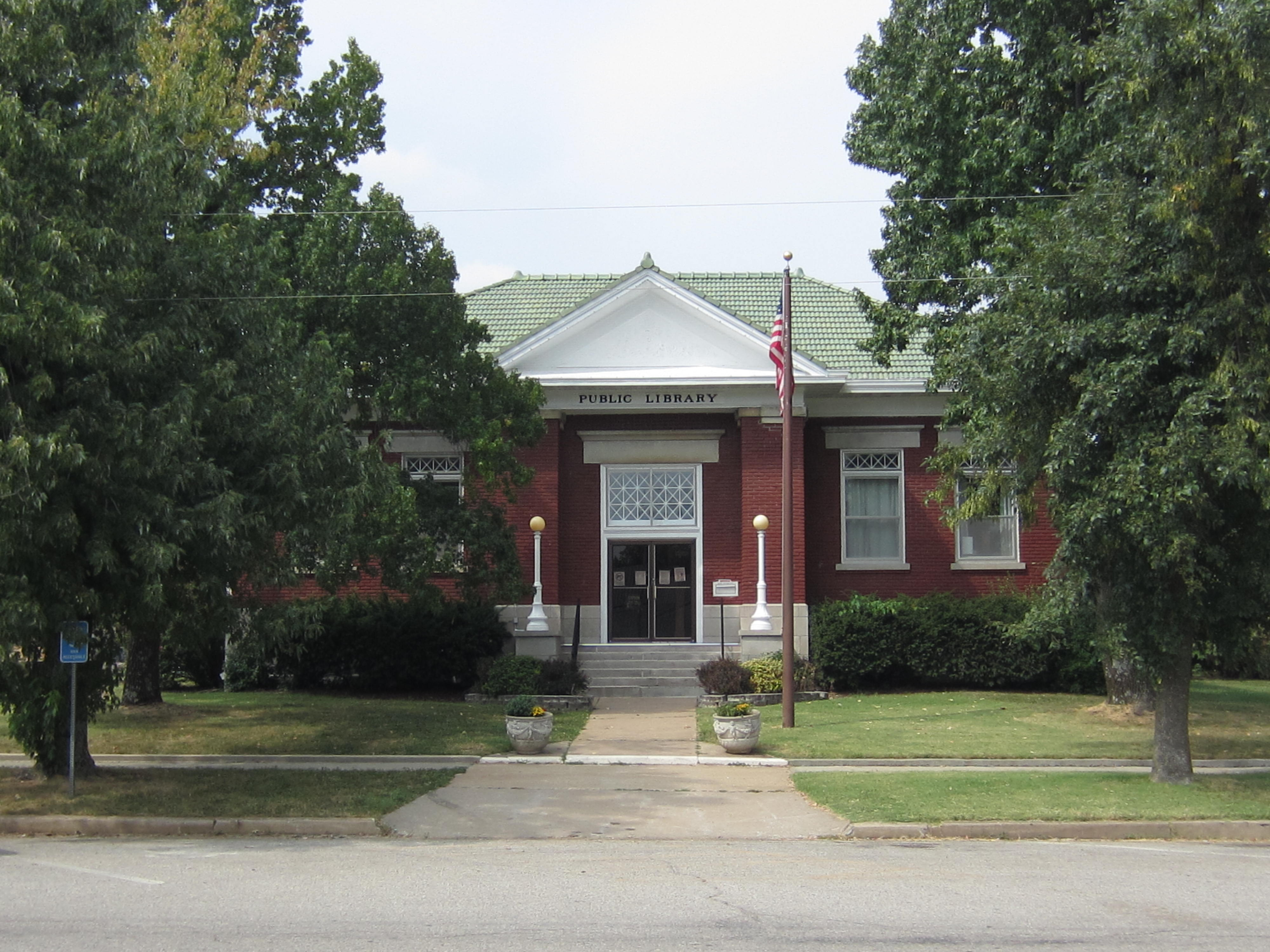
- Columbus Public Carnegie Library (2013)

- Location within Kansas Location within the United States
- Location: 205 N. Kansas, Columbus, Kansas
- Coordinates: 37°10′22″N 94°50′36″W
- Area: less than one acre
- Built: 1913
- Built by: Coxey, L.C.
- Architect: Washburn, George P., & Son
- Architectural style: Classical Revival
- MPS: Carnegie Libraries of Kansas TR
- NRHP reference No.: 87000932
- Added to NRHP: June 25, 1987

The Columbus Public Carnegie Library is a Carnegie library located at 205 N. Kansas in Columbus, Kansas. The library was built in 1913 through a $10,000 grant from the Carnegie foundation. George P. Washburn & Son designed the building in the Classical Revival style. The red brick building's facade is made up of three bays. The building's entrance pavilion features a wooden entablature reading "PUBLIC LIBRARY"; the entablature encircles the building. The doorway is topped by a glass transom with a triangular pattern and a limestone lintel.

The library was added to the National Register of Historic Places on June 25, 1987.
