= Yates Center Courthouse Square Historic District =

- U.S. National Register of Historic Places
- U.S. Historic district
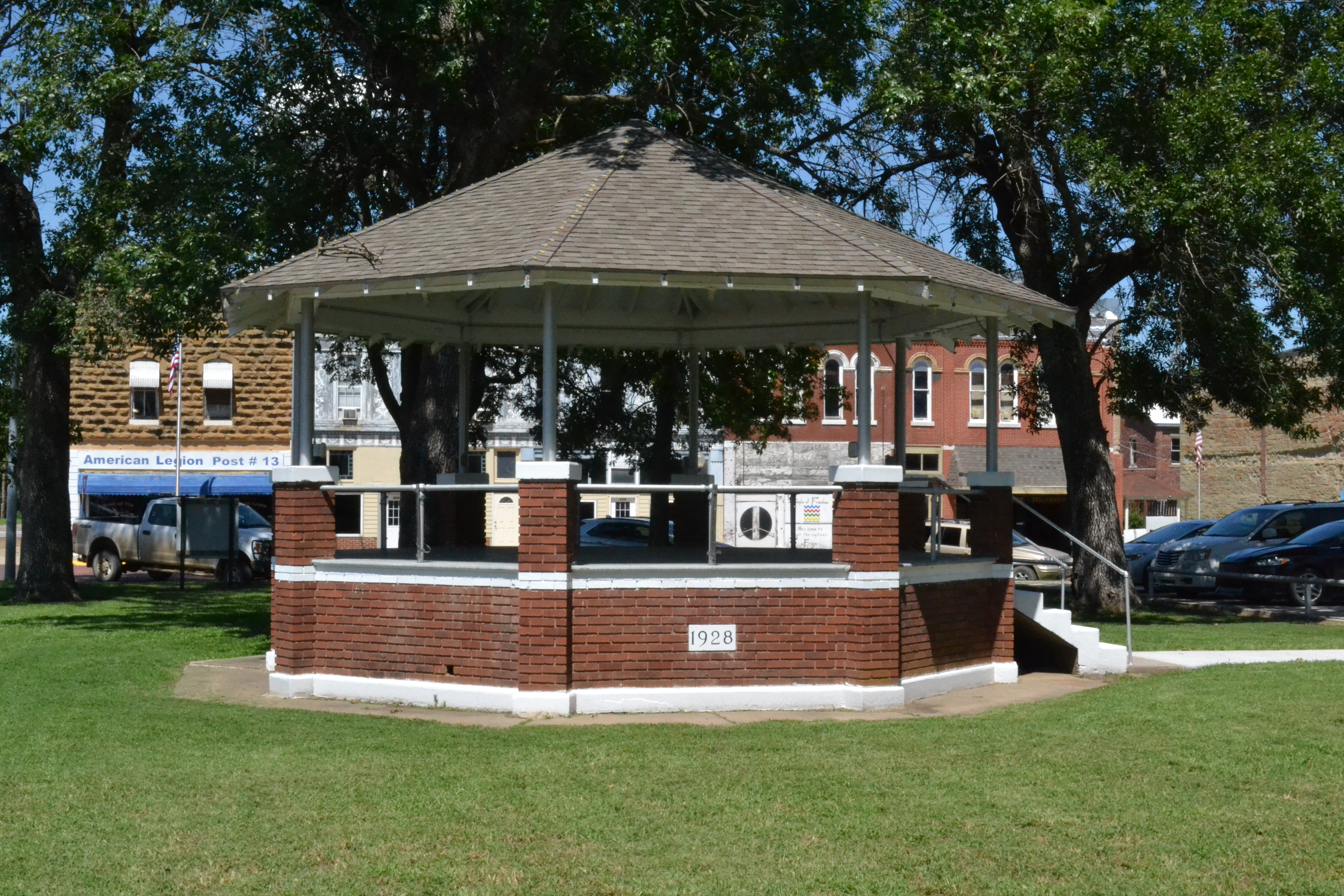

- Location within Kansas Location within the United States
- Location: Courthouse Sq., Yates Center, Kansas
- Coordinates: 37°53′19″N 95°44′8″W
- Area: 4 acres (1.6 ha)
- Architect: Grant Naylor; et al.
- Architectural style: Italianate, Romanesque, Early 20th Century Comm.
- NRHP reference No.: 86001120
- Added to NRHP: May 20, 1986

The Yates Center Courthouse Square Historic District, in Yates Center in Woodson County, Kansas, is a 4 acres (1.6 ha) historic district which was listed on the National Register of Historic Places in 1986. The district included 33 contributing buildings and two contributing structures.

Architect Grant Naylor and others have works included in the district. Architectural styles include Italianate, Romanesque Revival, and early 20th century commercial.

It includes the Woodson County Courthouse, the Yates Center Courthouse Square, the Yates Center National Bank at 100 N. Main St., the Masonic Lodge Building at 101 N State St., and others.
