= Ottawa High School and Junior High School =

- U.S. National Register of Historic Places
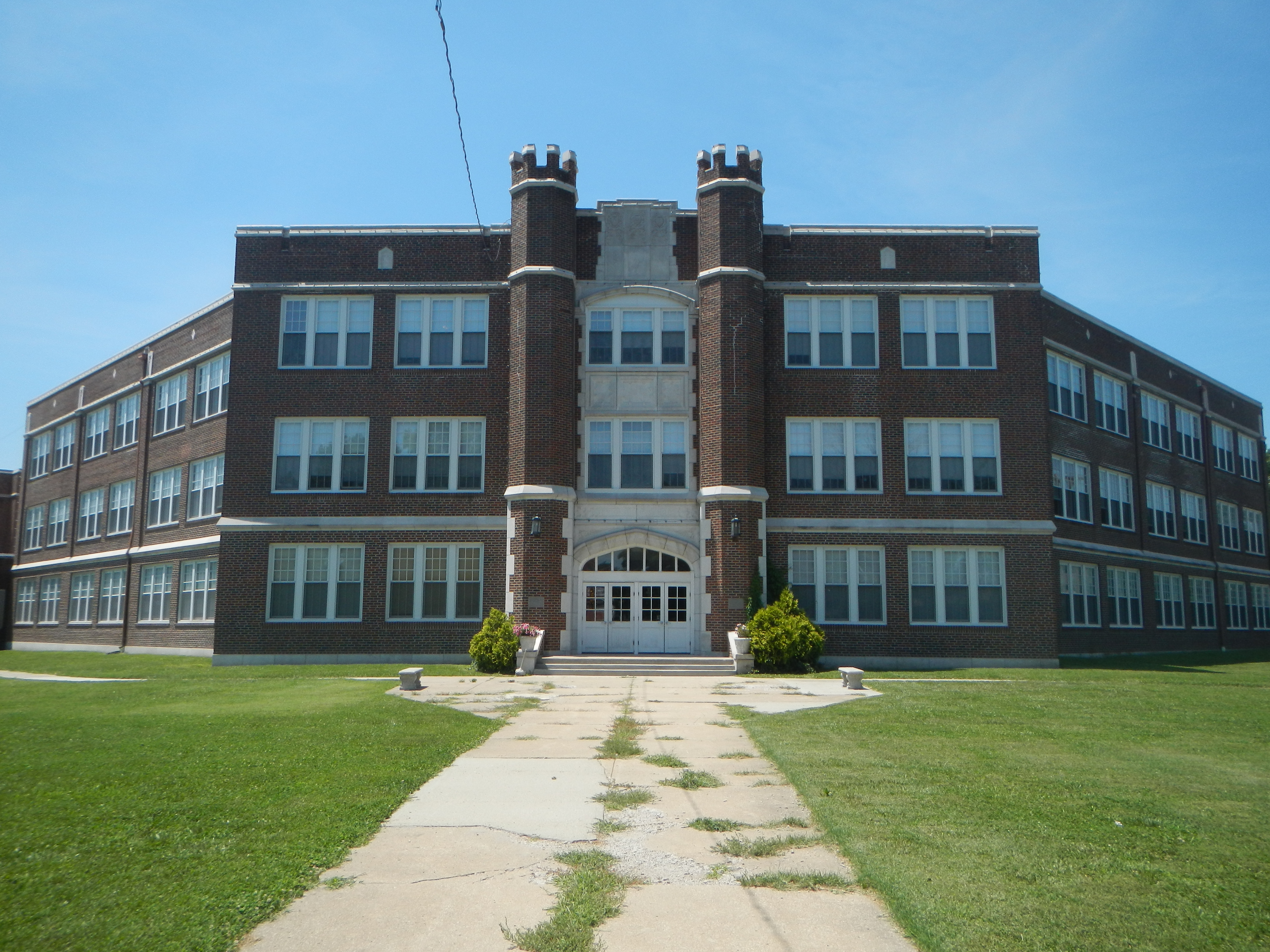
- The Junior High School

- Location within Kansas Location within the United States
- Location: 526 and 506 S. Main St., Ottawa, Kansas
- Coordinates: 38°36′38″N 95°16′09″W
- Area: 5.7 acres (2.3 ha)
- Built: 1917; 1927–28
- Architect: Washburn, George P. & Son
- Architectural style: Collegiate Gothic
- NRHP reference No.: 00001188
- Added to NRHP: October 6, 2000

The Ottawa High School and Junior High School, located at 526 and 506 S. Main St. respectively, are the historic former high school and junior high school in Ottawa, Kansas. The high school was built in 1917, while the junior high school was built from 1927 to 1928; an enclosed hallway connecting the two buildings was built with the junior high school. The high school was the first school in Ottawa to be built solely as a high school and the eighth school built in Ottawa. George P. Washburn & Son designed the high school in the Collegiate Gothic style. When the junior high school was constructed ten years later, the firm, by then known as Washburn & Stookey, designed the building in the same style as the high school.

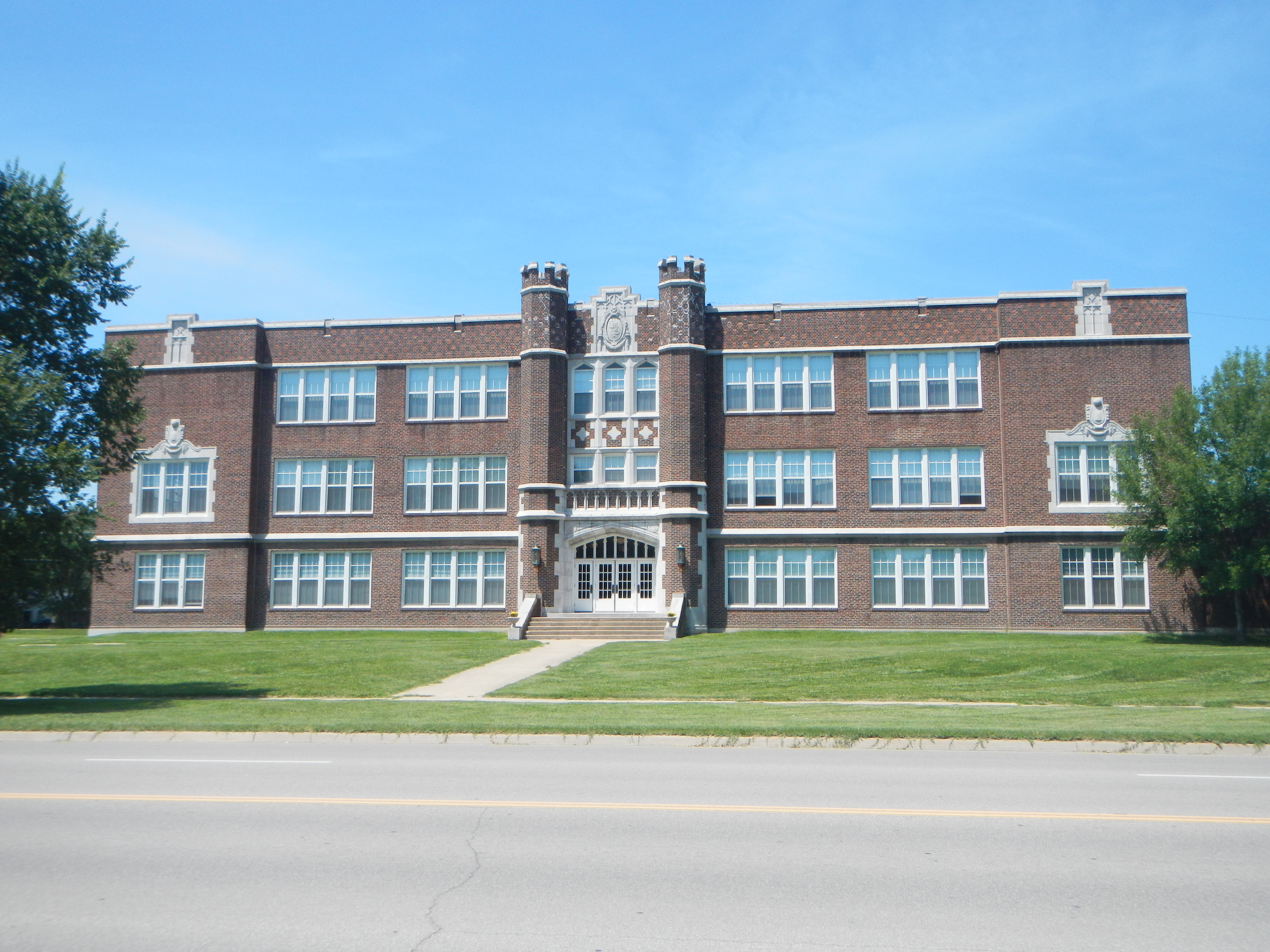
The High School

In 1966, a new high school was built for the upper three classes of students; the freshman class moved to the building in 1976, and the old high school and junior high school became a middle school. The two buildings were connected by a multi-purpose room in the same year. The middle school later vacated the building.

The school was added to the National Register of Historic Places on October 6, 2000.
