= Garnett, Kansas =

City in Anderson County, Kansas

- City and County seat
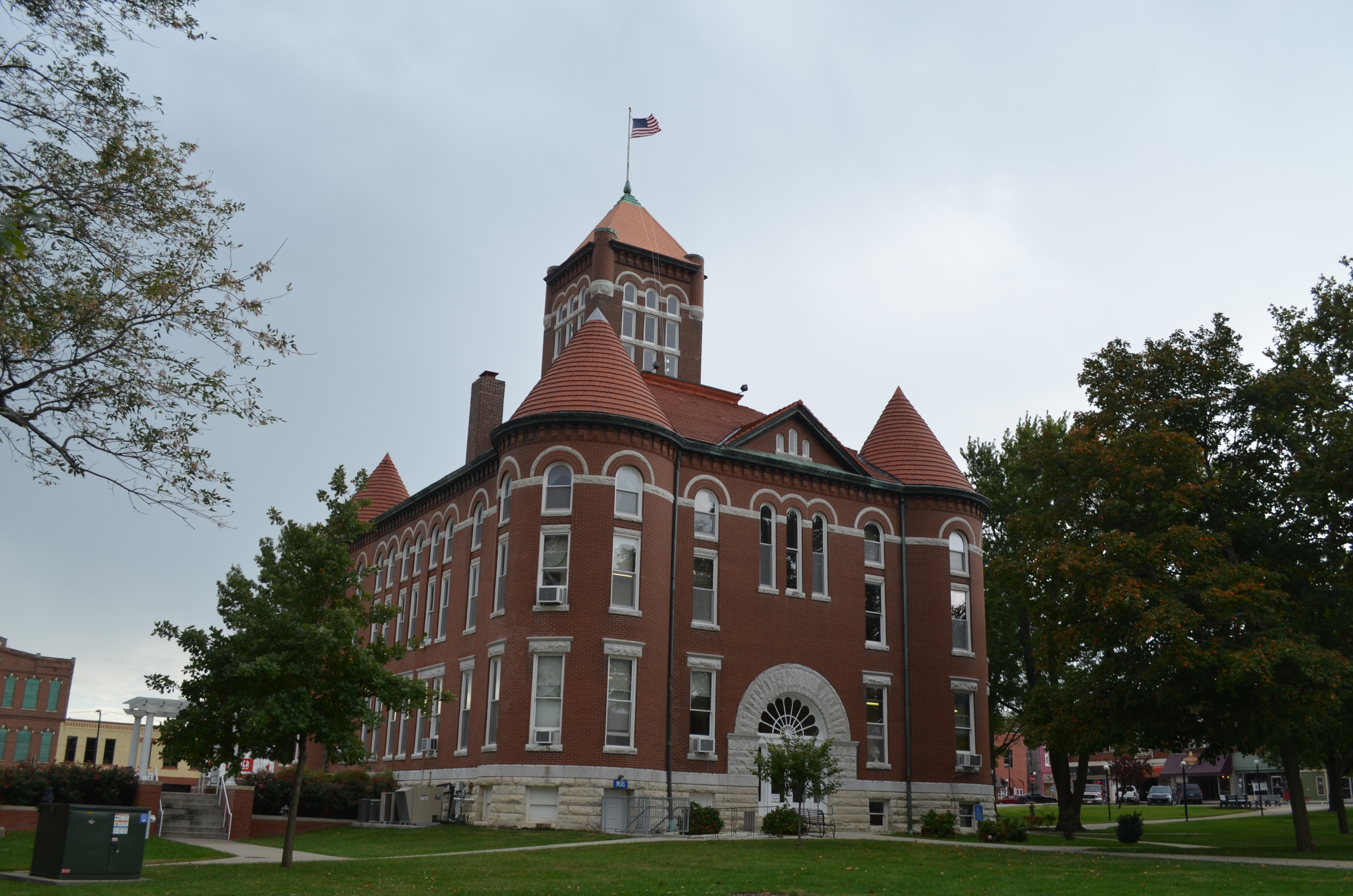
- Anderson County Courthouse (2016)

- Flag Logo
- Motto(s): "Small, Serene, Simply Garnett."
- Location within Anderson County and Kansas

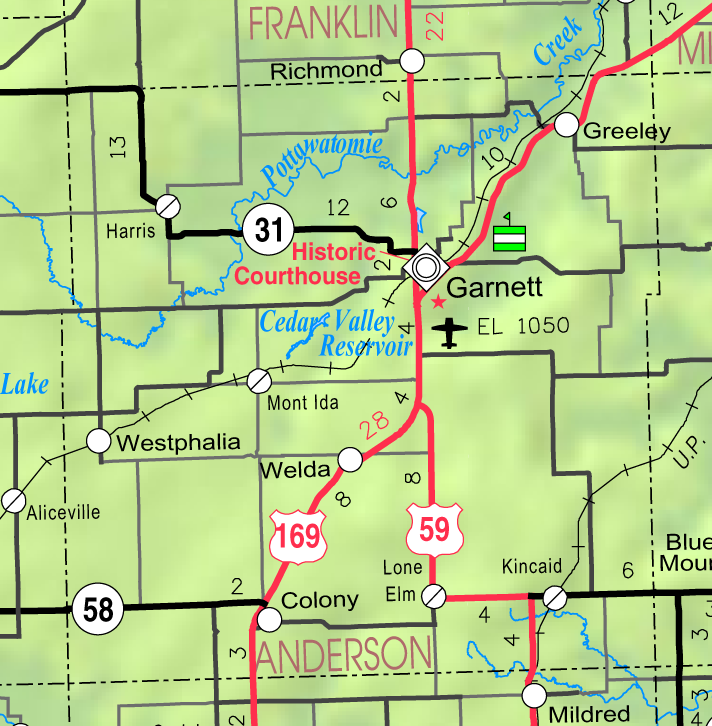
- KDOT map of Anderson County (legend)
- Coordinates: 38°16′59″N 95°14′27″W
- Country: United States
- State: Kansas
- County: Anderson
- Platted: 1857
- Incorporated: 1861
- Named for: W.A. Garnett

Area
  - Total: 3.19 sq mi (8.25 km^{2})
  - Land: 3.08 sq mi (7.98 km^{2})
  - Water: 0.10 sq mi (0.27 km^{2})
- Elevation: 1,070 ft (330 m)

Population (2020)
  - Total: 3,242
  - Density: 1,050/sq mi (406/km^{2})
- Time zone: UTC-6 (CST)
  - Summer (DST): UTC-5 (CDT)
- ZIP Code: 66032
- Area code: 785
- FIPS code: 20-25925
- GNIS ID: 485581
- Website: simplygarnett.com

Garnett is a city in and the county seat of Anderson County, Kansas, United States. As of the 2020 census, the population of the city was 3,242.

== History ==
Garnett was platted in 1857. Garnett is named for W. A. Garnett, a native of Louisville, Kentucky, and early promoter of the town of Garnett.

The city includes three places listed on the National Register of Historic Places: Anderson County Courthouse, Sennett and Bertha Kirk House, and Shelley-Tipton House.

The city is also home to the 1858 Garnett House Hotel.

== Geography ==
According to the United States Census Bureau, the city has a total area of 3.20 square miles (8.29 km^{2}), of which 3.10 square miles (8.03 km^{2}) is land and 0.10 square miles (0.26 km^{2}) is water.

Garnett is famous for its fossil finds from the late Carboniferous period. The lagerstätte is about 300 million years old and contains some of the earliest reptiles on earth.

=== Climate ===
The climate in this area is characterized by hot, humid summers and generally mild to cool winters. According to the Köppen Climate Classification system, Garnett has a humid subtropical climate, abbreviated "Cfa" on climate maps.

Climate data for Garnett, Kansas, 1991–2020 normals, extremes 1906–present
Month	Jan	Feb	Mar	Apr	May	Jun	Jul	Aug	Sep	Oct	Nov	Dec	Year
Record high °F (°C)	74 (23)	82 (28)	92 (33)	92 (33)	100 (38)	107 (42)	116 (47)	108 (42)	107 (42)	96 (36)	86 (30)	75 (24)	116 (47)
Mean maximum °F (°C)	63.8 (17.7)	69.7 (20.9)	78.0 (25.6)	83.4 (28.6)	88.3 (31.3)	93.9 (34.4)	98.8 (37.1)	99.1 (37.3)	94.5 (34.7)	86.6 (30.3)	73.4 (23.0)	65.1 (18.4)	100.4 (38.0)
Mean daily maximum °F (°C)	40.5 (4.7)	45.8 (7.7)	56.4 (13.6)	65.9 (18.8)	74.8 (23.8)	84.3 (29.1)	89.0 (31.7)	88.0 (31.1)	80.3 (26.8)	68.8 (20.4)	55.4 (13.0)	43.8 (6.6)	66.1 (18.9)
Daily mean °F (°C)	30.1 (−1.1)	34.5 (1.4)	44.6 (7.0)	54.4 (12.4)	64.6 (18.1)	74.1 (23.4)	78.6 (25.9)	77.0 (25.0)	68.8 (20.4)	57.1 (13.9)	44.4 (6.9)	34.0 (1.1)	55.2 (12.9)
Mean daily minimum °F (°C)	19.7 (−6.8)	23.1 (−4.9)	32.9 (0.5)	42.8 (6.0)	54.4 (12.4)	63.8 (17.7)	68.2 (20.1)	66.0 (18.9)	57.4 (14.1)	45.3 (7.4)	33.5 (0.8)	24.2 (−4.3)	44.3 (6.8)
Mean minimum °F (°C)	1.2 (−17.1)	5.8 (−14.6)	15.2 (−9.3)	27.4 (−2.6)	38.1 (3.4)	50.6 (10.3)	57.2 (14.0)	54.3 (12.4)	41.0 (5.0)	27.6 (−2.4)	17.4 (−8.1)	6.0 (−14.4)	−3.6 (−19.8)
Record low °F (°C)	−19 (−28)	−21 (−29)	−3 (−19)	15 (−9)	25 (−4)	42 (6)	46 (8)	44 (7)	28 (−2)	18 (−8)	2 (−17)	−23 (−31)	−23 (−31)
Average precipitation inches (mm)	1.24 (31)	1.83 (46)	2.39 (61)	4.20 (107)	5.49 (139)	5.15 (131)	4.30 (109)	4.34 (110)	4.33 (110)	3.37 (86)	2.25 (57)	1.74 (44)	40.63 (1,031)
Average snowfall inches (cm)	4.8 (12)	2.5 (6.4)	1.4 (3.6)	0.2 (0.51)	0.0 (0.0)	0.0 (0.0)	0.0 (0.0)	0.0 (0.0)	0.0 (0.0)	0.5 (1.3)	0.4 (1.0)	3.0 (7.6)	12.8 (32.41)
Average precipitation days (≥ 0.01 in)	4.7	5.1	7.1	8.7	10.6	9.1	7.4	6.7	7.3	6.6	5.0	4.7	83.0
Average snowy days (≥ 0.1 in)	2.5	1.3	0.6	0.1	0.0	0.0	0.0	0.0	0.0	0.2	0.2	1.3	6.2
Source 1: NOAA
Source 2: National Weather Service

== Demographics ==
Historical population
Census	Pop.	Note	%±
1870	1,219		—
1880	1,389		13.9%
1890	2,191		57.7%
1900	2,078		−5.2%
1910	2,334		12.3%
1920	2,329		−0.2%
1930	2,768		18.8%
1940	2,607		−5.8%
1950	2,693		3.3%
1960	3,034		12.7%
1970	3,169		4.4%
1980	3,310		4.4%
1990	3,210		−3.0%
2000	3,368		4.9%
2010	3,415		1.4%
2020	3,242		−5.1%
U.S. Decennial Census

=== 2020 census ===
As of the 2020 census, Garnett had a population of 3,242, with 1,363 households and 791 families. The population density was 1,051.9 per square mile (406.1/km^{2}). There were 1,542 housing units at an average density of 500.3 per square mile (193.2/km^{2}).

The median age was 41.1 years. 24.6% of residents were under the age of 18, 8.1% were from 18 to 24, 21.8% were from 25 to 44, 23.1% were from 45 to 64, and 22.4% were 65 years of age or older. For every 100 females, there were 94.5 males, and for every 100 females age 18 and over there were 90.1 males age 18 and over. 0.0% of residents lived in urban areas, while 100.0% lived in rural areas.

Of the 1,363 households, 28.1% had children under the age of 18 living in them. Of all households, 42.3% were married-couple households, 20.0% were households with a male householder and no spouse or partner present, and 29.7% were households with a female householder and no spouse or partner present. About 36.9% of all households were made up of individuals, and 19.6% had someone living alone who was 65 years of age or older. The average household size was 2.1 and the average family size was 2.8.

Of all housing units, 11.6% were vacant. The homeowner vacancy rate was 4.7% and the rental vacancy rate was 9.5%.

Racial composition as of the 2020 census
Race	Number	Percent
White	2,952	91.1%
Black or African American	11	0.3%
American Indian and Alaska Native	29	0.9%
Asian	29	0.9%
Native Hawaiian and Other Pacific Islander	2	0.1%
Some other race	40	1.2%
Two or more races	179	5.5%
Hispanic or Latino (of any race)	101	3.1%

Income, poverty, and education

The 2016–2020 5-year American Community Survey estimates show that the median household income was $48,259 (with a margin of error of +/- $19,319) and the median family income was $65,614 (+/- $7,432). Males had a median income of $37,132 (+/- $15,660) versus $32,183 (+/- $7,135) for females. The median income for those above 16 years old was $34,125 (+/- $8,418). Approximately, 18.5% of families and 17.9% of the population were below the poverty line, including 18.0% of those under the age of 18 and 19.0% of those ages 65 or over. The percent of those with a bachelor's degree or higher was estimated to be 15.9% of the population.

=== 2010 census ===
As of the census of 2010, there were 3,415 people, 1,419 households, and 862 families living in the city. The population density was 1,101.6 inhabitants per square mile (425.3/km^{2}). There were 1,591 housing units at an average density of 513.2 per square mile (198.1/km^{2}). The racial makeup of the city was 96.7% White, 0.4% African American, 0.6% Native American, 0.5% Asian, 0.6% from other races, and 1.3% from two or more races. Hispanic or Latino of any race were 2.1% of the population.

There were 1,419 households, of which 30.0% had children under the age of 18 living with them, 45.5% were married couples living together, 10.4% had a female householder with no husband present, 4.9% had a male householder with no wife present, and 39.3% were non-families. 34.0% of all households were made up of individuals, and 19.4% had someone living alone who was 65 years of age or older. The average household size was 2.33 and the average family size was 2.98.

The median age in the city was 40.9 years. 25.1% of residents were under the age of 18; 7.7% were between the ages of 18 and 24; 21.7% were from 25 to 44; 23% were from 45 to 64; and 22.5% were 65 years of age or older. The gender makeup of the city was 47.9% male and 52.1% female.

== Education ==
The community is served by Garnett USD 365 public school district, and operates Garnett Elementary School and Anderson County Junior-Senior High School in Garnett.

Prior to school unification, the Garnett High School mascot was Bulldogs. The Anderson County High School mascot is also Bulldogs.

Garnett is also home to St. Rose Philippine Duchesne Catholic School. Built in 1947, St. Rose Philippine Duchesne serves grades K-8, and is a member of the Roman Catholic Archdiocese of Kansas City in Kansas, network of schools.

== Infrastructure ==
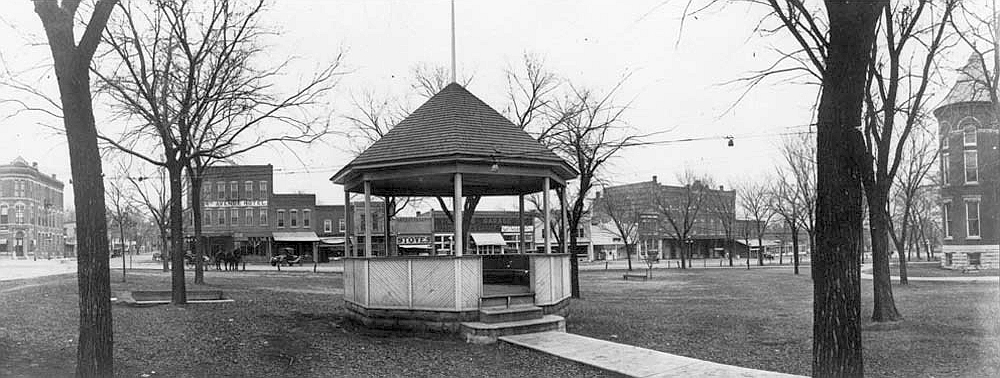
Public square, circa 1900-1919

=== Transportation ===
==== Rail ====
The area has one railroad, six freight lines and six interstate carriers.

==== Roads ====
Garnett is at the crossroads of U.S. Routes 59 and 169 and K-31. Interstate 35 is located 19 miles north of here and Interstate 70 is approximately 50 miles away.

==== Air ====
The Garnett Industrial Airport is located along U.S. 169. The nearest international air service is at the Kansas City International Airport, 90 miles away.

==== Bike ====
The Prairie Spirit Trail is a 53 miles (85 km) long hiking and bike path at Prairie Spirit Trail State Park which passes through Garnett. The trail follows the former Santa Fe Railroad.

== Notable people ==
- David G. Booth, founder of Dimensional Fund Advisors and namesake of David Booth Kansas Memorial Stadium
- Sam Brownback, former United States Ambassador-at-Large for International Religious Freedom, former Governor of Kansas and former member of Congress
- Arthur Capper, former Governor of Kansas and US Senator
- Edgar Masters, poet, lawyer and playwright
- P. Thomas Thornbrugh, currently a judge on the Oklahoma Civil Appeals Court, was born in Garnett
