= Shelley-Tipton House =

Historic house in Kansas, United States

- U.S. National Register of Historic Places
- Location within Kansas Location within the United States
- Location: 812 W. 4th St., Garnett, Kansas
- Coordinates: 38°16′50″N 95°15′22″W
- Area: 1 acre (0.40 ha)
- Built: c.1871
- Architectural style: Italianate
- NRHP reference No.: 82002650
- Added to NRHP: May 6, 1982

The Shelley-Tipton House, located at 812 W. 4th St. in Garnett, Kansas, was built in about 1871 in Italianate style. It was listed on the National Register of Historic Places in 1982.

The two-story house is about 40 by 40 feet (12 m × 12 m) in plan. It has a cupola on its low roof.

The listing included three contributing buildings.
