= Doniphan County Courthouse (Kansas) =

- U.S. National Register of Historic Places
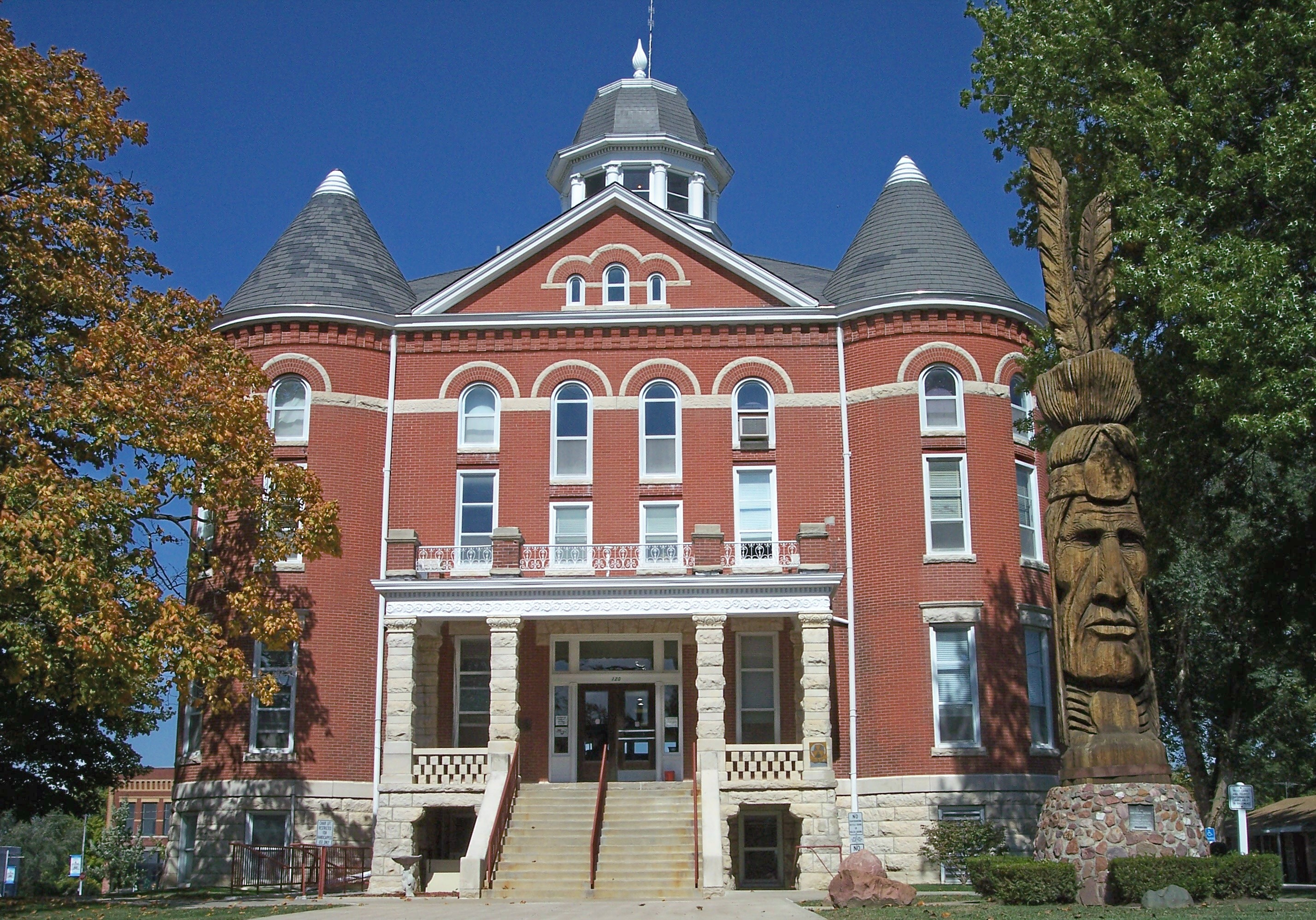

- Location within Kansas Location within the United States
- Interactive map showing the location of Doniphan County Courthouse
- Location: Courthouse Sq., bounded by Walnut, Liberty, Chestnut, and Main Sts., Troy, Kansas
- Coordinates: 39°47′10″N 95°5′20″W
- Area: 2 acres (0.81 ha)
- Built: 1905–06
- Built by: Wagenknecht, J.H.
- Architect: George P. Washburn & Sons
- Architectural style: Romanesque
- NRHP reference No.: 74000826
- Added to NRHP: July 15, 1974

The Doniphan County Courthouse, located in Courthouse Square in Troy, is the seat of government of Doniphan County, Kansas. The courthouse was built from 1905 to 1906 and was the fourth courthouse in the county. Architect George P. Washburn, who designed several courthouses in the state, designed the building in the Romanesque Revival style. The red brick building has a limestone base, and the building's north and south entrances feature limestone porches. The courthouse features circular towers at each corner and a decagonal cupola at the center of the building. The top floor of the building features arched windows connected by a band of stone.

The courthouse was added to the National Register of Historic Places on July 15, 1974. The courthouse is also included in the Doniphan County Courthouse Square Historic District, which is also on the National Register.
