= Butler County Courthouse (Kansas) =

- U.S. National Register of Historic Places
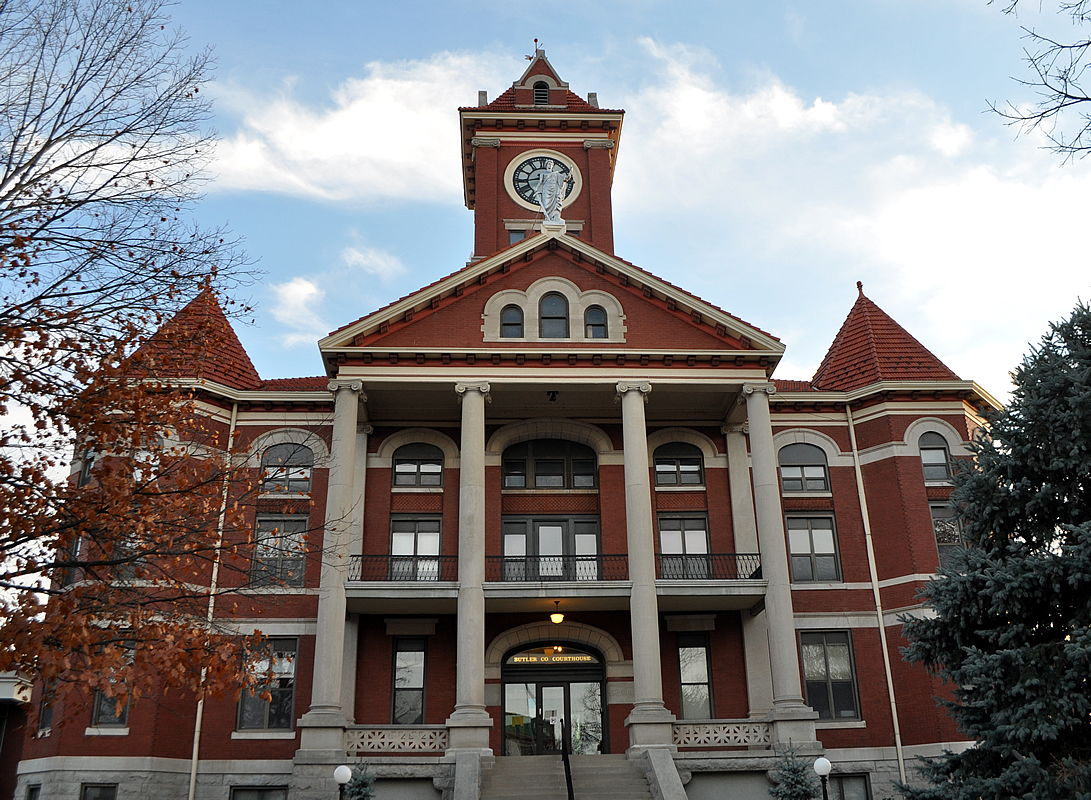

- Location within Kansas Location within the United States
- Interactive map showing the location for Butler County Courthouse
- Location: 205 W. Central Avenue, El Dorado, Kansas
- Coordinates: 37°49′00.91″N 96°51′06.68″W
- Built: 1908
- Architect: George P. Washburn & Sons
- Architectural style: Romanesque Revival
- NRHP reference No.: 02000390
- Added to NRHP: April 26, 2002

The Butler County Courthouse is a public courthouse constructed in 1909, in El Dorado, Kansas. It was designed by George P. Washburn & Sons to serve as the main county courthouse for Butler County. The Romanesque Revival courthouse was typical of Washburn's courthouse designs; of the eleven surviving courthouses designed by the architect, nine are Romanesque. The red brick courthouse features a central clock tower and four octagonal corner towers, a statue of the Goddess of Justice, and a hipped roof with cross gables, all common features of Washburn's work. It was added to the National Register of Historic Places in 2002.

Butler County was organized on February 11, 1859. The County Clerk has land records from 1887 and birth and death records from 1887 to 1911.

The courthouse is still in operation as such.

== See also ==
- National Register of Historic Places listings in Butler County, Kansas

== Gallery ==
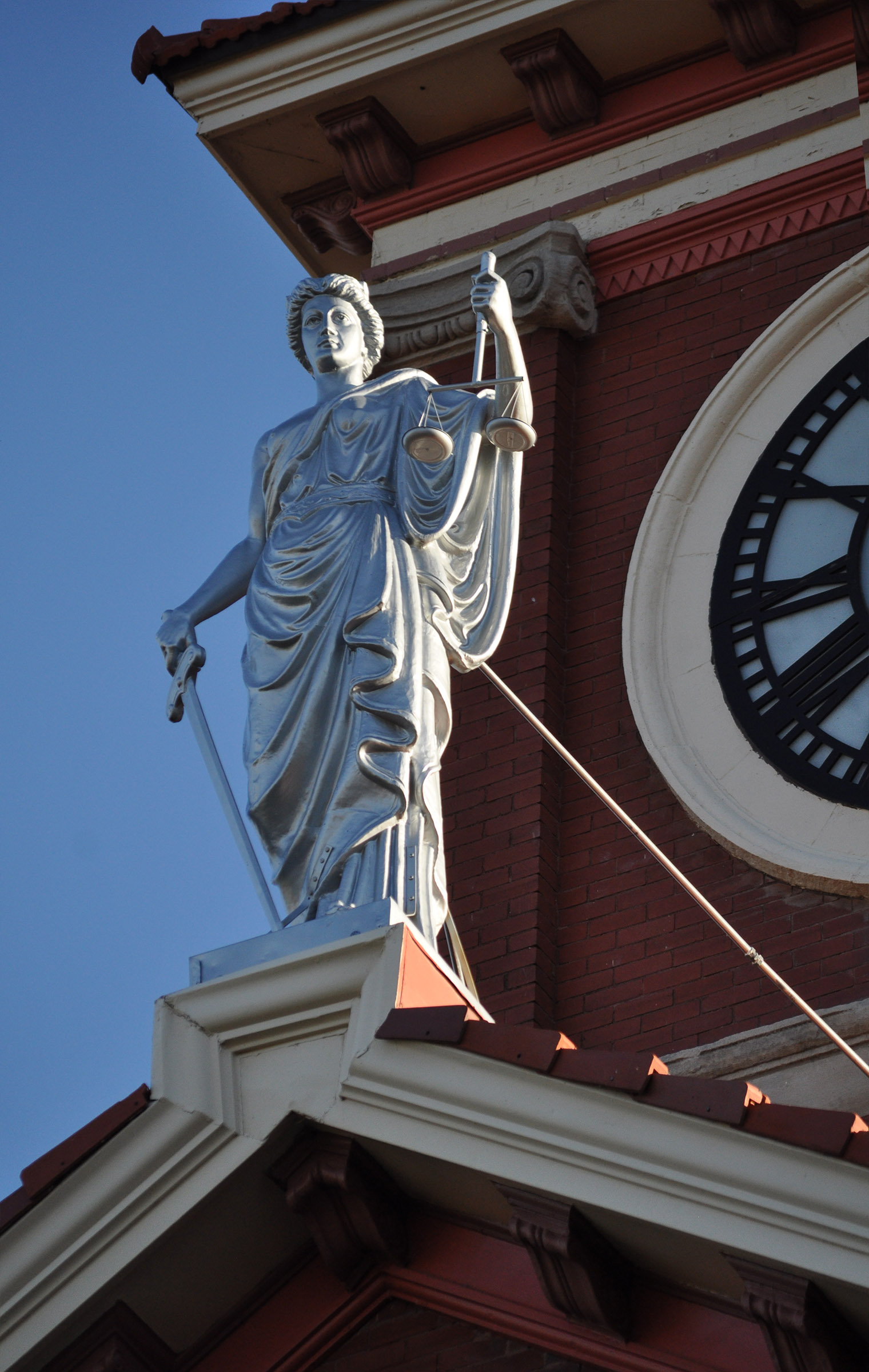
Goddess of Justice, Butler County Courthouse, El Dorado, Kansas

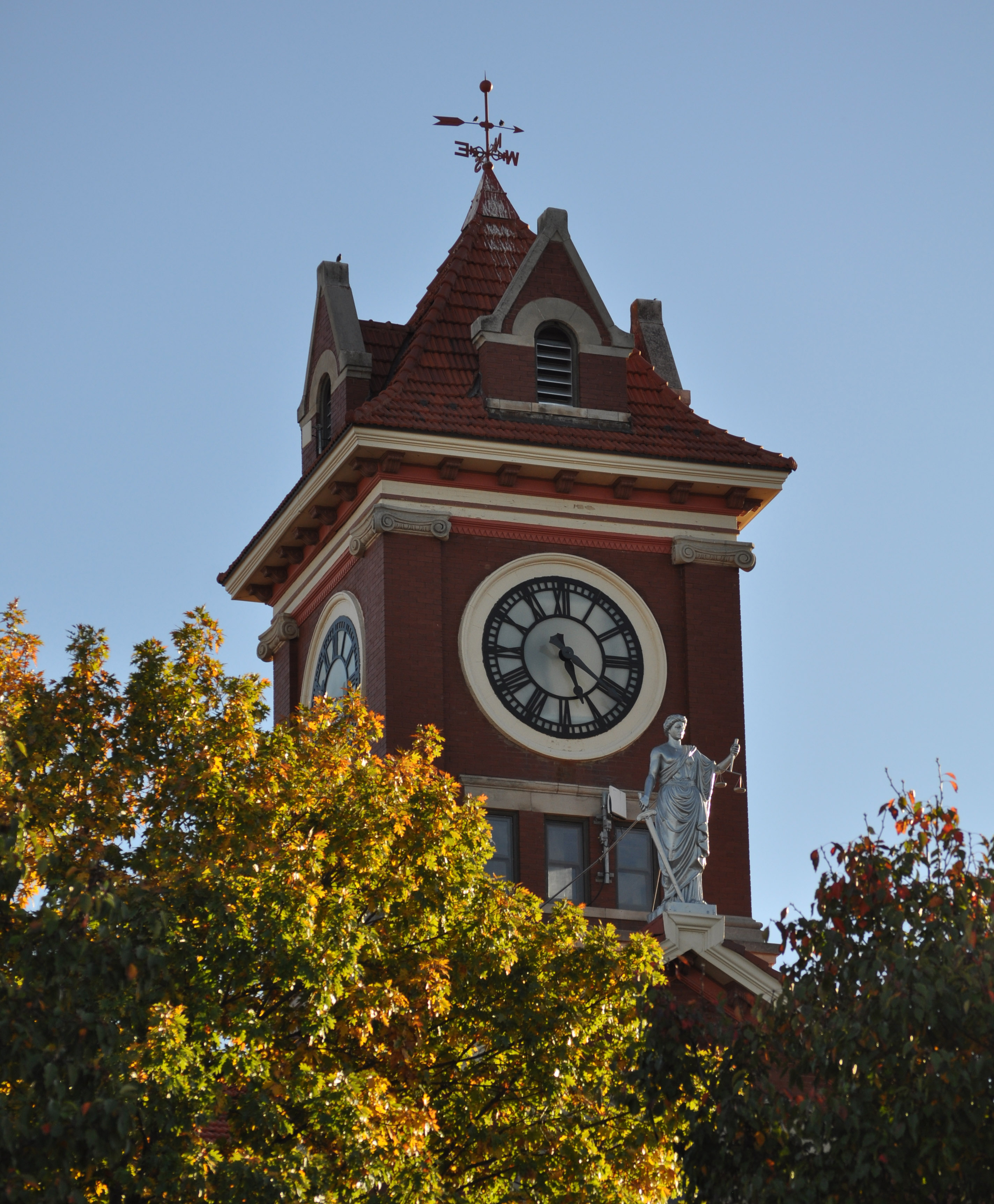
Central Clock Tower, Butler County Courthouse, El Dorado, Kansas
