= Harper County Courthouse (Kansas) =

- U.S. National Register of Historic Places
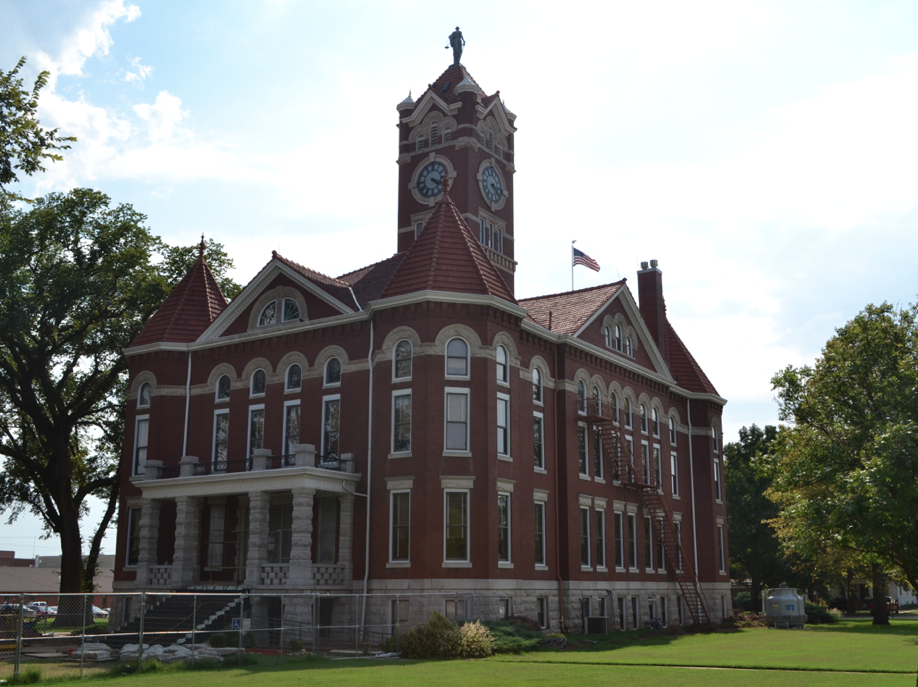
- Harper County Courthouse in August 2015

- Location within Kansas Location within the United States
- Interactive map showing the location for Harper County Courthouse
- Location: 201 N. Jennings Ave., Anthony, Kansas
- Coordinates: 37°9′14″N 98°1′45″W
- Area: 2 acres (0.81 ha)
- Built: 1908
- Architect: George P. Washburn
- NRHP reference No.: 78001282
- Added to NRHP: November 22, 1978

The Harper County Courthouse, located at 201 N. Jennings Ave. in Anthony, is the seat of government of Harper County, Kansas. Built in 1907, the courthouse replaced a smaller and more modest courthouse and represented the county's prosperity at the time. The construction of the courthouse also settled a lingering controversy over Harper County's seat. George P. Washburn, a prominent Kansas architect, designed the courthouse. The courthouse's design features four corner towers and a clock tower at the center of the building. The west and east entrances to the building feature stone porches. The arched third-story windows of the courthouse are connected by a band of stone encircling the building.

The courthouse was added to the National Register of Historic Places on November 22, 1978.
