= Ottawa Library (Kansas) =

- U.S. National Register of Historic Places
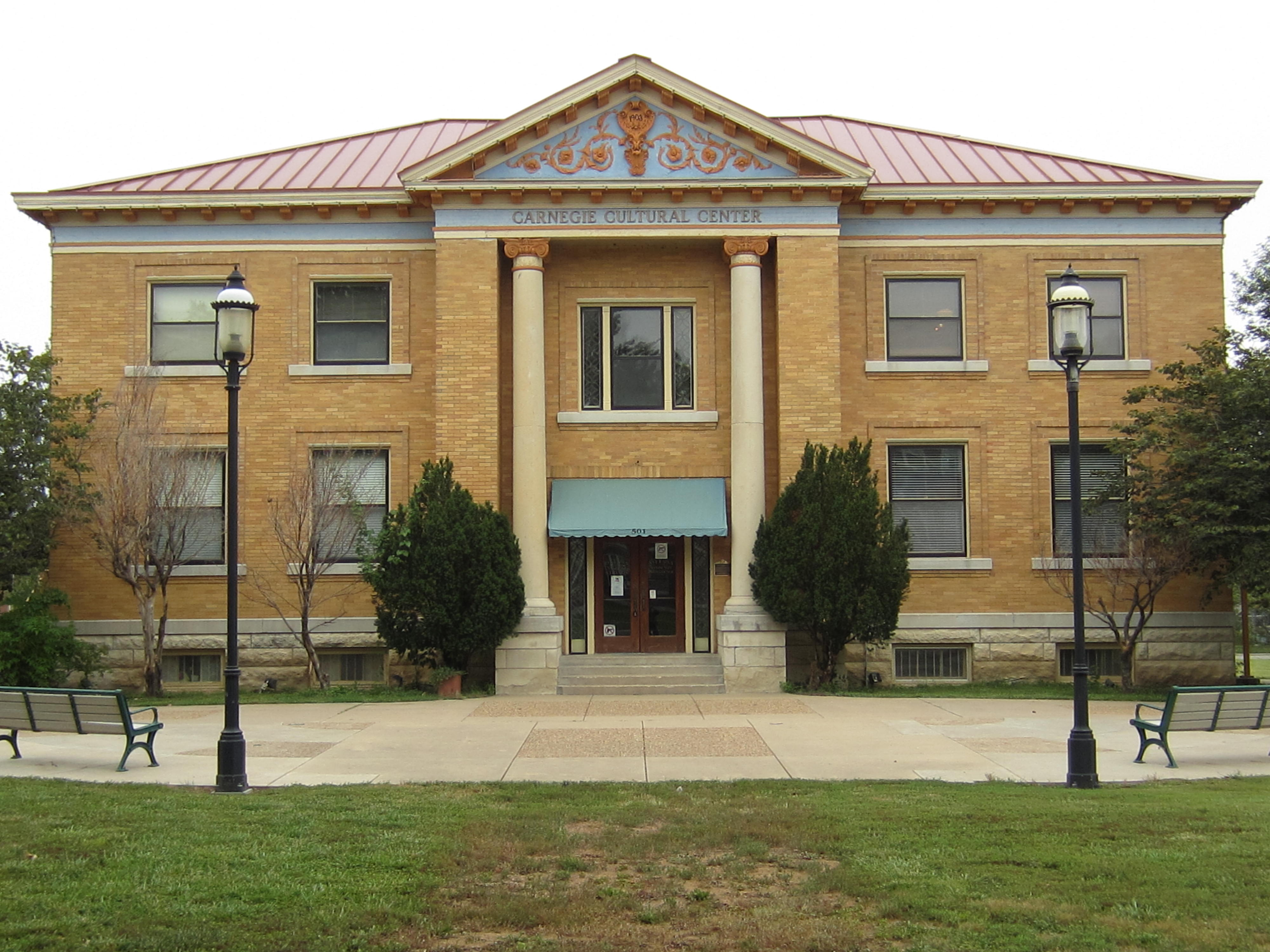

- Location within Kansas Location within the United States
- Location: 1st & Hickory Sts., Ottawa, Kansas
- Coordinates: 38°36′15″N 95°15′43″W
- Area: 1 acre (0.40 ha)
- Built: 1903
- Architect: Washburn, George P.
- Architectural style: Free classical style
- NRHP reference No.: 80001465
- Added to NRHP: December 1, 1980

The Ottawa Library is a Carnegie library located at the intersection of 5th and Main Streets in Ottawa, Kansas. Built in 1903, the library housed the collection of the Ottawa Library Association, which was founded in 1873. The Carnegie Foundation provided a $15,000 grant toward the library's construction. George P. Washburn, a prominent Kansas architect who lived in Ottawa, designed the library in a free classical style. The two-story yellow brick building has a limestone foundation and a hipped roof. The building's main entrance has a two-story portico with classical ornamentation, and the rear features a hemicycle.

The library was added to the National Register of Historic Places on December 1, 1980. It is also part of the Historic Ottawa Central Business District, which is also listed on the National Register. The building no longer serves as Ottawa's library (which is now located in the downtown area), and now serves as an art and culture center.
