= Miami County Courthouse (Kansas) =

- U.S. National Register of Historic Places
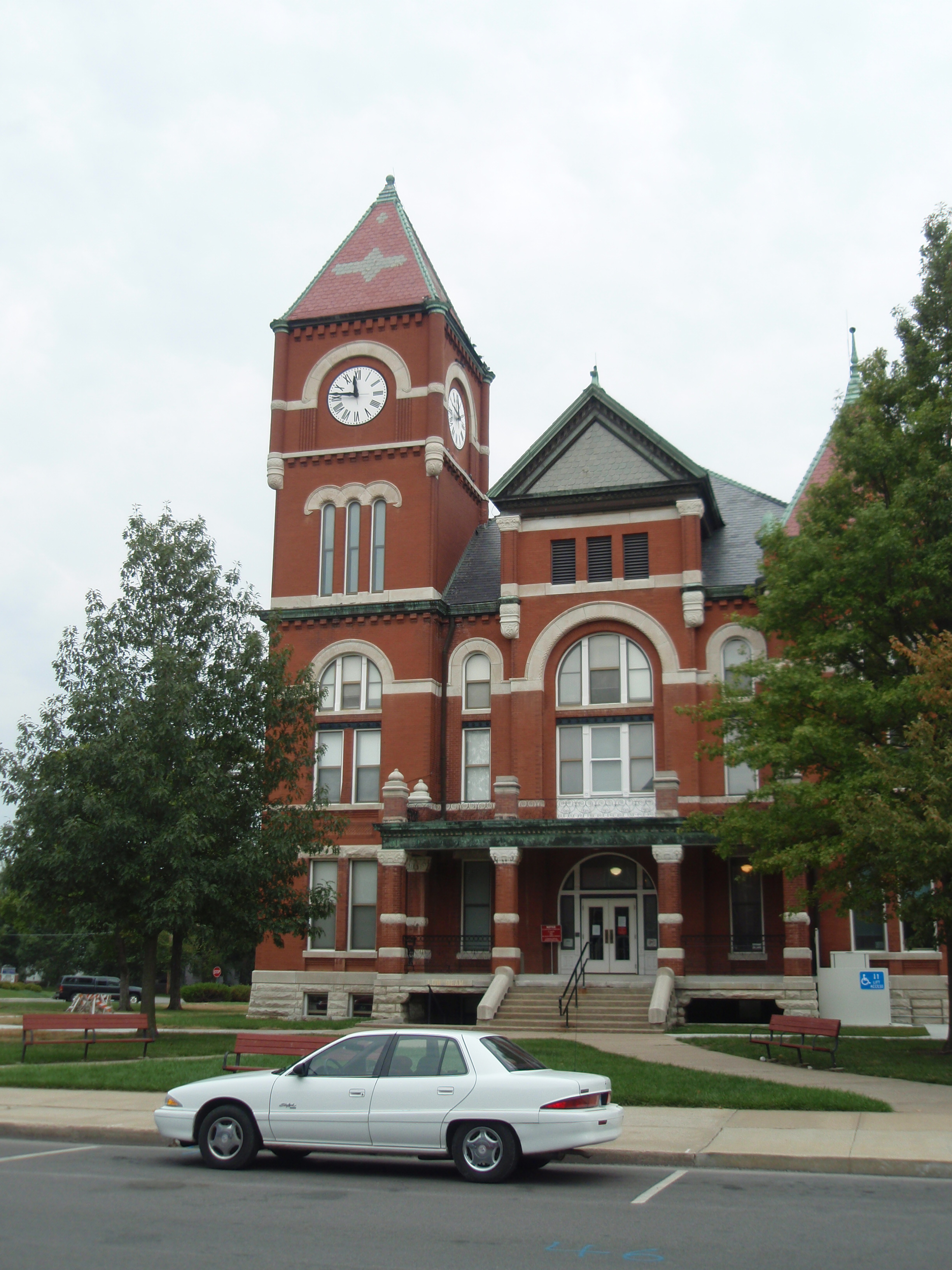

- Location within Kansas Location within the United States
- Interactive map showing the location of Miami County Courthouse
- Location: E of jct. of Miami and Silver Sts., Paola, Kansas
- Coordinates: 38°34′16″N 94°52′42″W
- Area: 1.5 acres (0.61 ha)
- Built: 1898–99
- Architect: Washburn, George P.
- Architectural style: Late Victorian
- NRHP reference No.: 73000768
- Added to NRHP: March 1, 1973

The Miami County Courthouse, located east of the junction of Miami and Silver Streets in Paola, is the seat of government of Miami County, Kansas. The courthouse was built from 1898 to 1899 and has housed the county's government ever since. Architect George P. Washburn designed the courthouse; its design is Victorian with Romanesque Revival details. The building features a tower at each corner; the southwest tower was once a clock tower but no longer has a clock. The east and west entrances to the courthouse feature porches with brick columns. The upper windows of the building are arched with stone; the stone continues around the building in a band, a feature described as "one of the strongest elements of the [building's] design". The courthouse's roof incorporates a variety of designs; the main part of the roof and the towers are hipped, while gable ends are located between the towers.

The courthouse was added to the National Register of Historic Places on March 1, 1973.
