= Anderson County Courthouse (Kansas) =

- U.S. National Register of Historic Places
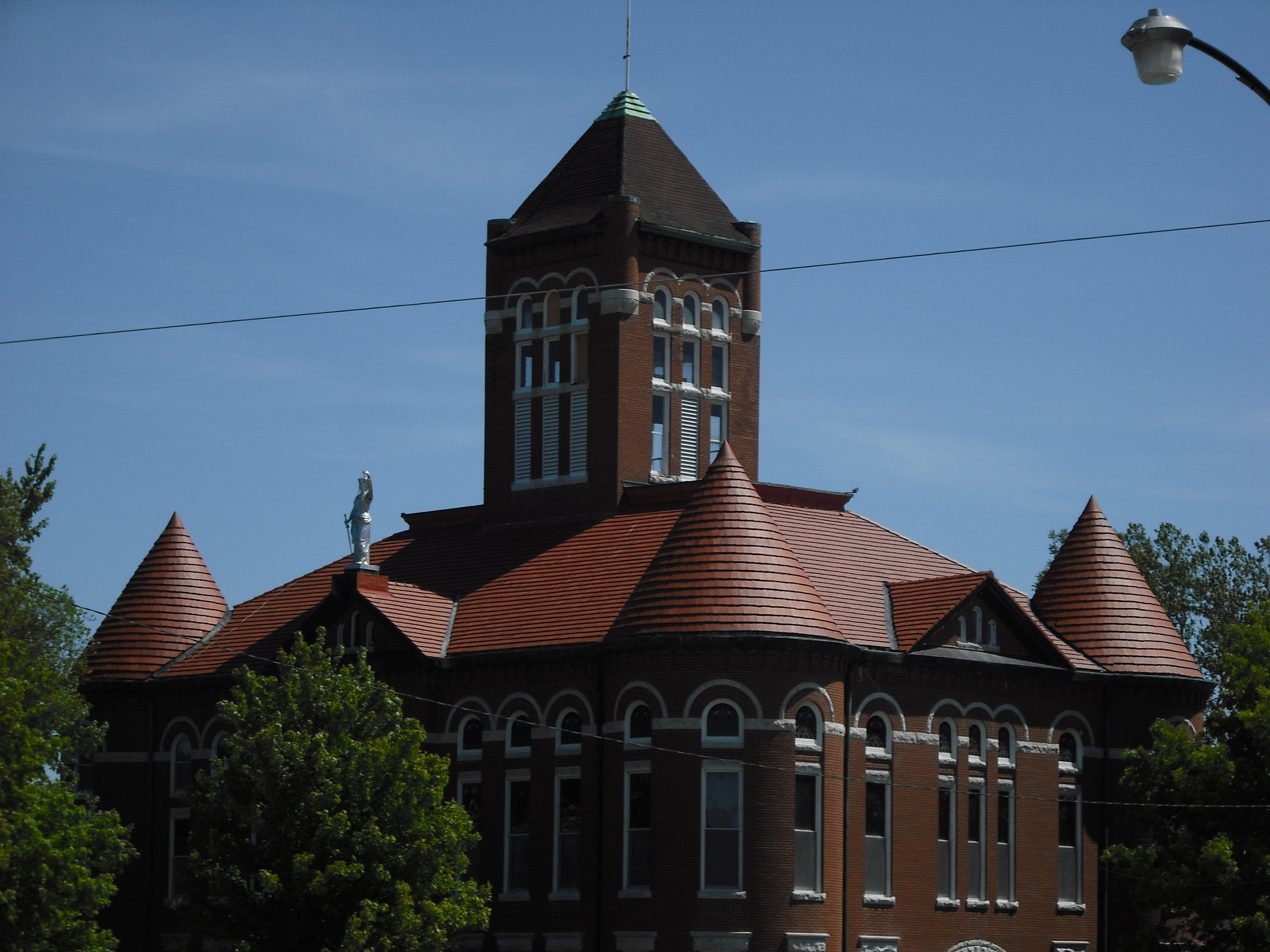
- The Anderson County Courthouse in 2009

- Location within Kansas Location within the United States
- Interactive map showing the location of Anderson County Courthouse
- Location: 4th and Oak Sts., Garnett, Kansas
- Coordinates: 38°16′50″N 95°13′48″W
- Built: 1902
- Built by: Latimer & Benning
- Architect: George P. Washburn
- Architectural style: Romanesque
- NRHP reference No.: 72000483
- Added to NRHP: April 26, 1972

The Anderson County Courthouse, located at 4th and Oak Streets in Garnett, serves as the seat of government for Anderson County, Kansas. The courthouse was built from 1901 to 1902 by contractors Latimer & Benning, the building cost $75,000. The courthouse was designed by George P. Washburn designed the courthouse in the Romanesque Revival style.

== Description ==
Distinctive features of the courthouse include a bell tower and four corner towers with conical roofs. The building's entrances are adorned with fan-shaped windows and stone arches. The third-floor windows also feature arches, with these stone arches linked by a continuous band of stone encircling the building.

The Anderson County Courthouse was listed on the National Register of Historic Places in 1972.
