= Kingman County Courthouse (Kansas) =

- U.S. National Register of Historic Places
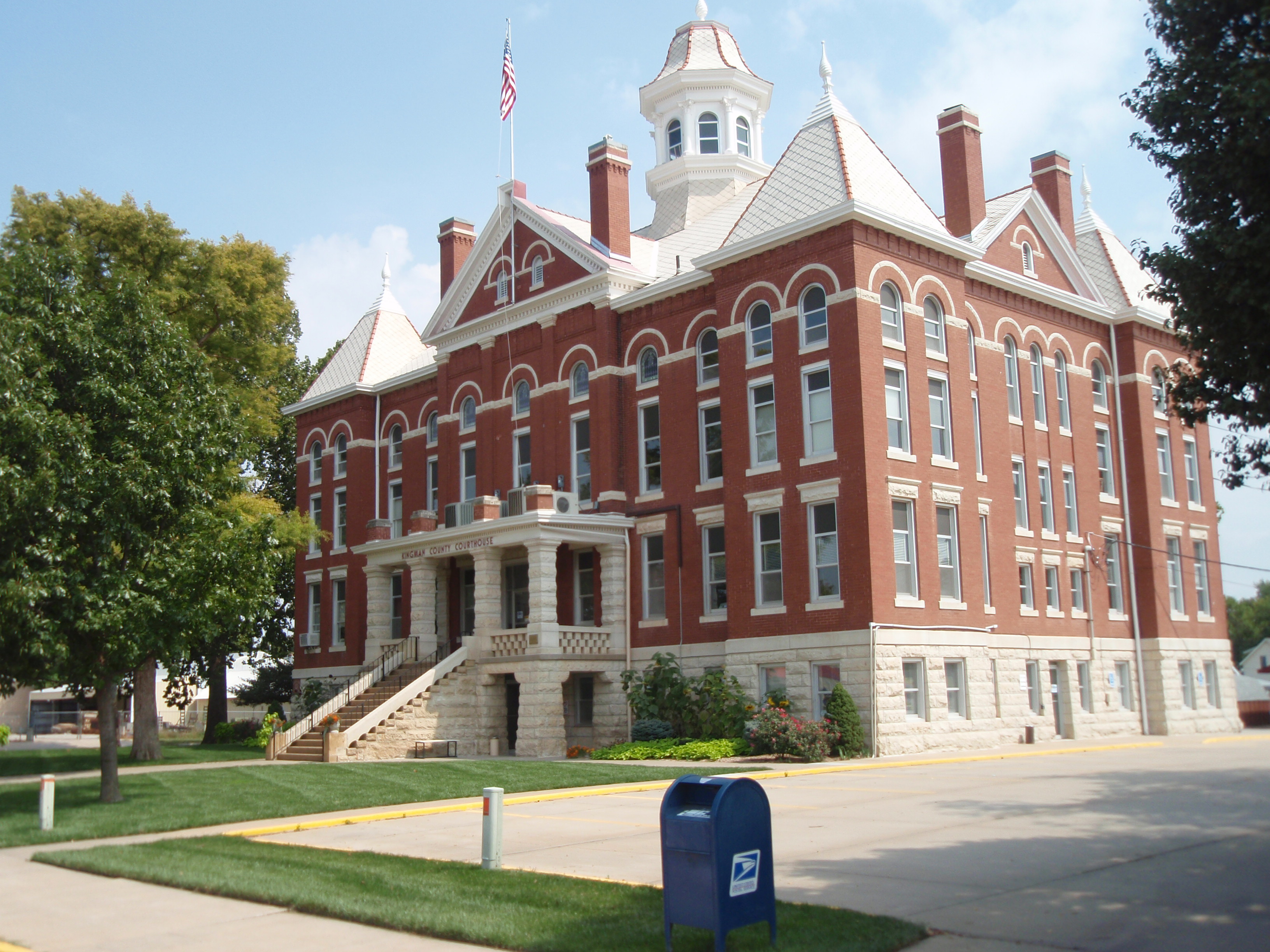
- Kingman County Courthouse, September 6, 2009

- Location within Kansas Location within the United States
- Interactive map showing the location of Kingman County Courthouse
- Location: 120 (now 130) Spruce Street, Kingman, Kansas
- Coordinates: 37°38′34″N 98°6′40″W
- Area: less than one acre
- Built: 1907-1908
- Architect: George P. Washburn; Matheim & Walters
- Architectural style: Late Victorian
- NRHP reference No.: 85002128
- Added to NRHP: September 11, 1985

The Kingman County Courthouse, located at 130 Spruce Street in Kingman, Kansas, is an historic 3-story redbrick courthouse building set on a ground-floor basement of rough-faced white limestone. The stairway and entrance portico leading to the main entrance are of the same limestone. Its roof is basically hipped with gables in the middle of each side, pyramids on each corner and an octagonal shaped cupola rising from the center. Built in 1907-08 for Kingman County, it is one of 15 courthouses (13 in Kansas and one each in Illinois and Oklahoma) designed by architect George P. Washburn of Ottawa, Kansas. His design for this building has been called a mixture of Late Victorian, Romanesque, Free Classical and Queen Anne architectural styles.

On September 11, 1985, the Kingman County Courthouse was added to the National Register of Historic Places.

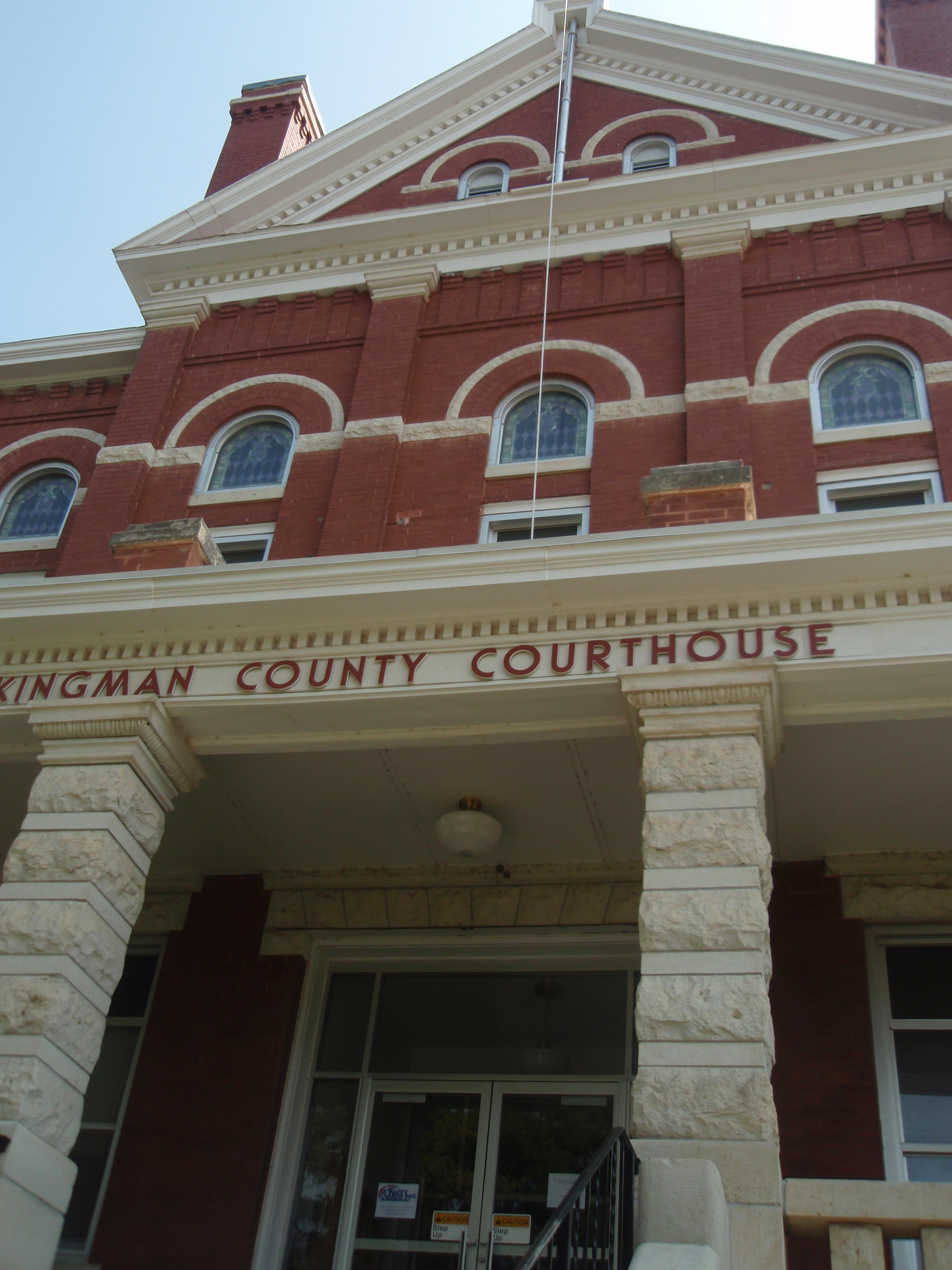
Front Detail

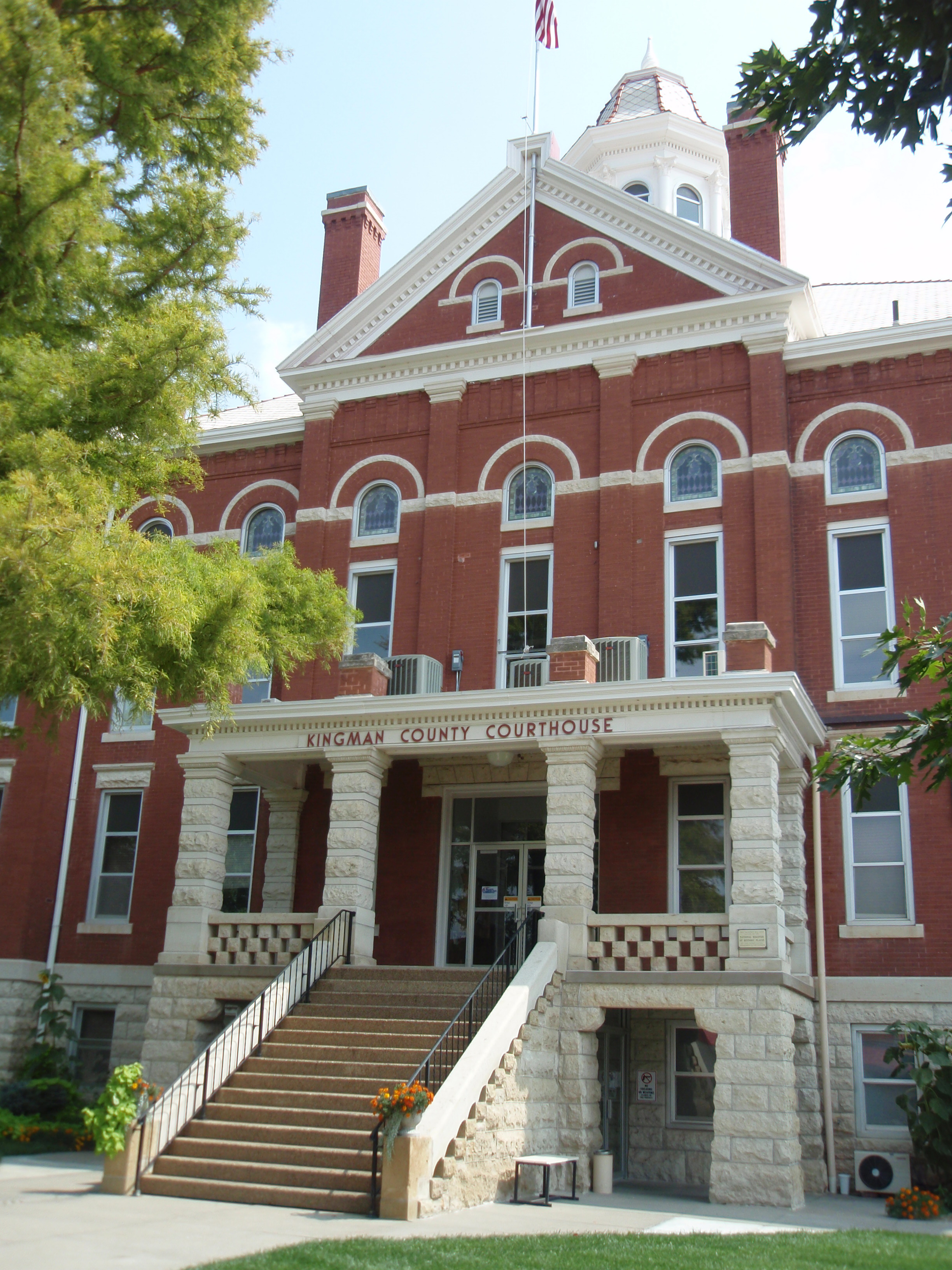
Front of the courthouse
