= Franklin County Courthouse (Kansas) =

- U.S. National Register of Historic Places
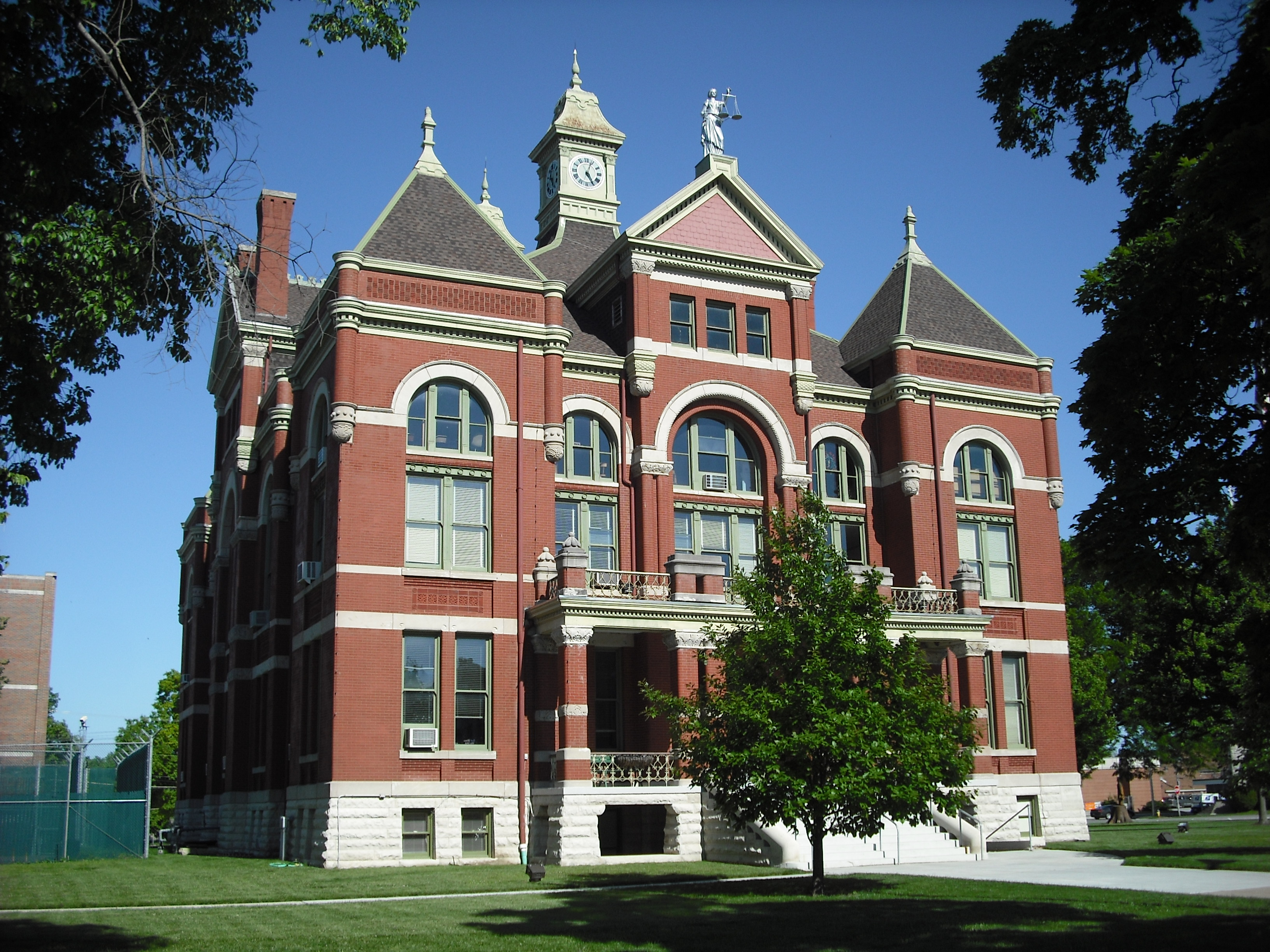

- Location within Kansas Location within the United States
- Interactive map showing the location of Franklin County Courthouse
- Location: Main St., Ottawa, Kansas
- Coordinates: 38°36′48″N 95°16′3″W
- Area: 1 acre (0.40 ha)
- Built: 1892–93
- Architect: Washburn, George P.
- Architectural style: Romanesque
- NRHP reference No.: 72000502
- Added to NRHP: March 17, 1972

The Franklin County Courthouse, located in Courthouse Square on Main Street in Ottawa, is the seat of government of Franklin County, Kansas. The courthouse was built in 1892. Although Ottawa had been the county seat since 1864, it lacked a permanent courthouse prior to then. Architect George P. Washburn designed the courthouse in the Romanesque Revival style; the red brick courthouse is considered one of Washburn's "most outstanding works". The design features four square corner towers, a typical feature of Washburn's designs; two cupolas on the roof include a bell tower and a clock tower. The intricate roof design includes a main hipped roof with gable ends on each side and steep hipped roofs atop the towers. The roof line is ridged with a metal spine, and a dentillated cornice runs beneath the roof's edge. The east and west entrances to the courthouse are through large porches supported by brick columns and topped with balconies. The second-story windows are arched and connected by a band of stone.

The courthouse was added to the National Register of Historic Places on March 17, 1972.
