= Frank C. Squires =

American architect

Frank C. Squires (1871–1934) was an American architect based in Topeka, Kansas. A number of his works are listed on the National Register of Historic Places.

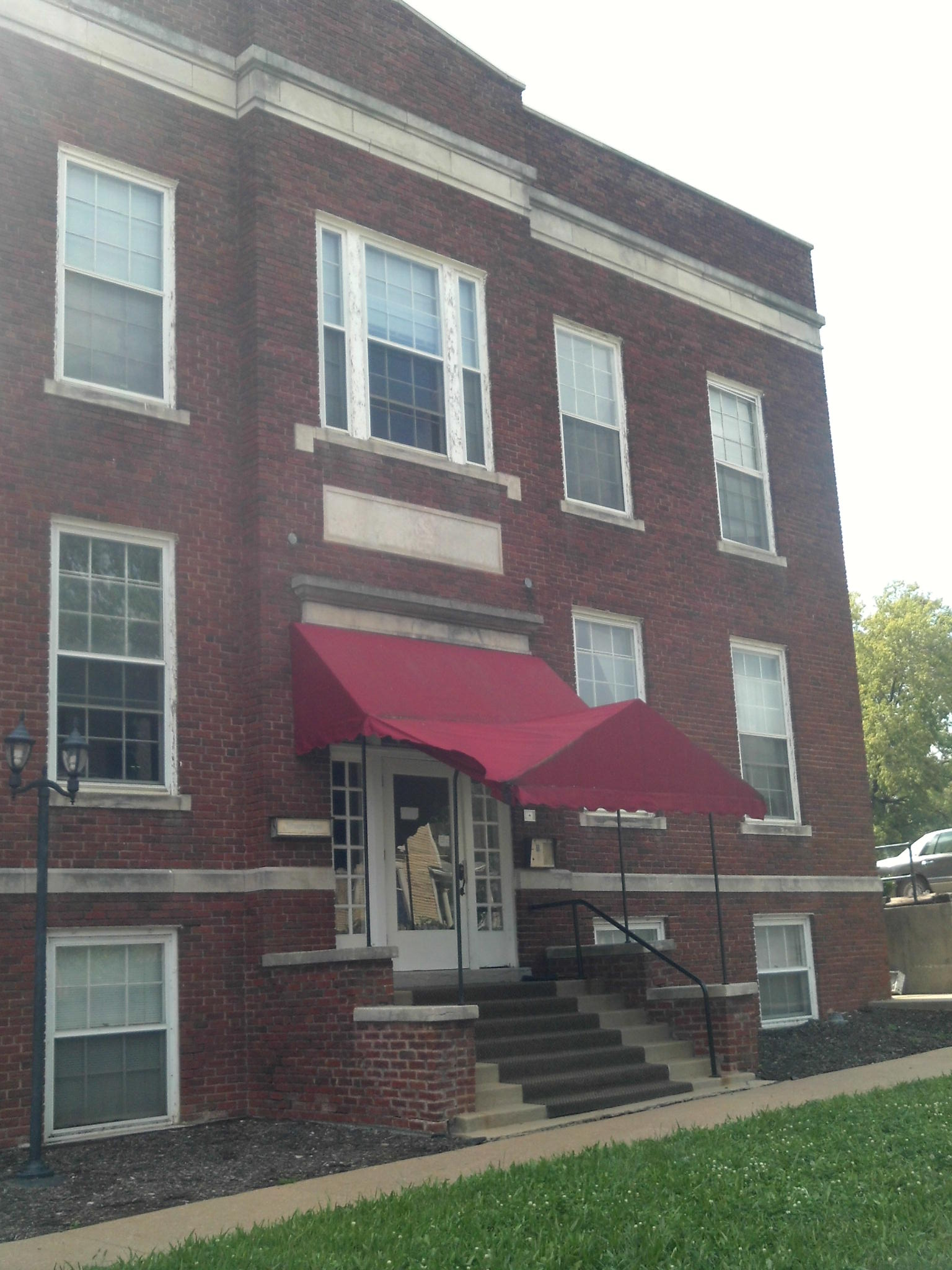
St. John's Lutheran School, Topeka

On some projects he worked with J.C. Holland.

Works include:

- One or more works in Downtown Manhattan Historic District, generally including the blocks between Humboldt and Pierre streets from 3rd to 5th streets, Manhattan, Kansas (Squires, F., et al.), NRHP-listed
- Marion County Courthouse (1906), 3rd and Williams streets. Marion, Kansas (Squires, Frank), NRHP-listed
- Old Junction City High School, Adams and 6th streets, Junction City, Kansas (Holland & Squires), NRHP-listed
- Osborne County Courthouse, 423 W. Main Street, Osborne, Kansas (Holland, J. C. & Squires), NRHP-listed
- Riley County Courthouse, 100 Courthouse Plaza, Manhattan, Kansas (Holland, J. C. & F. C. Squires), NRHP-listed
- Rooks County Courthouse, 115 N. Walnut Street, Stockton, Kansas (Squires, Frank C.), NRHP-listed
- St. John's Lutheran School, 315 W. 4th Street, Topeka, Kansas (Squires, Frank C.), NRHP-listed
- Thomas County Courthouse, 300 N. Court Colby, Kansas (Holland, J. C. & Squires, Frank), NRHP-listed
- Woman's Club Building, 420 W. 9th Street, Topeka, Kansas (Squires, Frank C.), NRHP-listed

== See also ==
- Charles W. Squires
