= Charles W. Squires =

American architect

Charles Wesley Squires (1851–1934), also known as C.W. Squires, was an American architect in Emporia, Kansas. A number of his works are listed on the National Register of Historic Places.

== Work ==
- Anderson Carnegie Memorial Library, The Way College of Emporia, 1300 W. Twelfth Ave., Emporia, KS, NRHP-listed
- Burns Union School, SW corner Ohio and Main Sts., Burns, KS, NRHP-listed
- Dodge City Public Library, 2nd and Spruce Aves., Dodge City, KS, NRHP-listed
- Greenwood Hotel, 300 N. Main, Eureka, KS, NRHP-listed
- Howard National Bank (1889) in Howard, Kansas, NRHP-listed
- Hutchinson Public Carnegie Library, 427 N. Main, Hutchinson, KS, NRHP-listed
- Keebler-Stone House, 831 Constitution St., Emporia, KS, NRHP-listed
- Lincoln County Courthouse, 3rd and Lincoln Ave., Lincoln, KS, NRHP-listed
- Hallie B. Soden House, 802 S. Commercial St., Emporia, KS, NRHP-listed
- One or more works in Peabody Downtown Historic District, along Walnut St. between Division and First Sts., Peabody, KS, NRHP-listed

== See also ==
- Frank C. Squires
