= Rice County Courthouse =

Rice County Courthouse may refer to:

- Rice County Courthouse (Kansas), Lyons, Kansas
- Rice County Courthouse and Jail, Faribault, Minnesota
