= Thomas County Courthouse =

Thomas County Courthouse may refer to:

- Thomas County Courthouse (Georgia), Thomasville, Georgia
- Thomas County Courthouse (Kansas), Colby, Kansas
