= Ralph Perkins =

Ralph Perkins may refer to:

- Ralph Perkins (Maine politician) (1888–1967)
- Ralph Perkins (Kansas politician) (1893–1976)
