= Mitchell County Courthouse (Kansas) =

- U.S. National Register of Historic Places
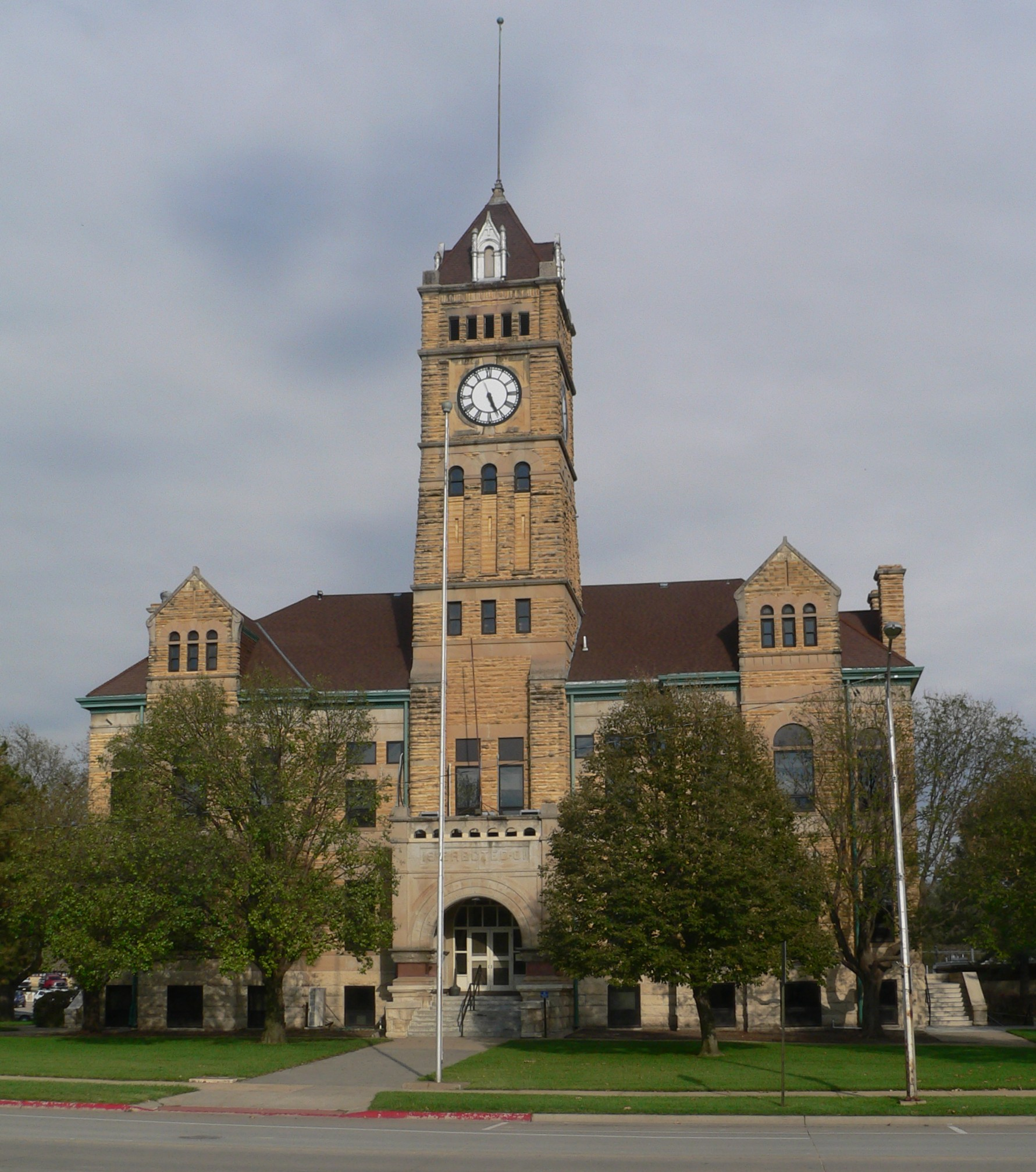

- Location within Kansas Location within the United States
- Interactive map showing the location of Mitchell County Courthouse
- Location: Main St. and Hersey Ave., Beloit, Kansas
- Coordinates: 39.458649°N 98.108463°W
- Built: 1900-1901
- Architect: Holland, J.C.
- Architectural style: Romanesque, Richardsonian Romanesque
- NRHP reference No.: 77000591
- Added to NRHP: November 23, 1977

Mitchell County Courthouse in Beloit, Kansas is a Richardsonian Romanesque building built during 1900–1901. It was designed by J.C. Holland. It was listed on the National Register of Historic Places in 1977.

Its plan is 95 feet (29 m) by about 76 feet (23 m) and it has a 110 feet (34 m) tower.
