= Clay County Courthouse (Kansas) =

- U.S. National Register of Historic Places
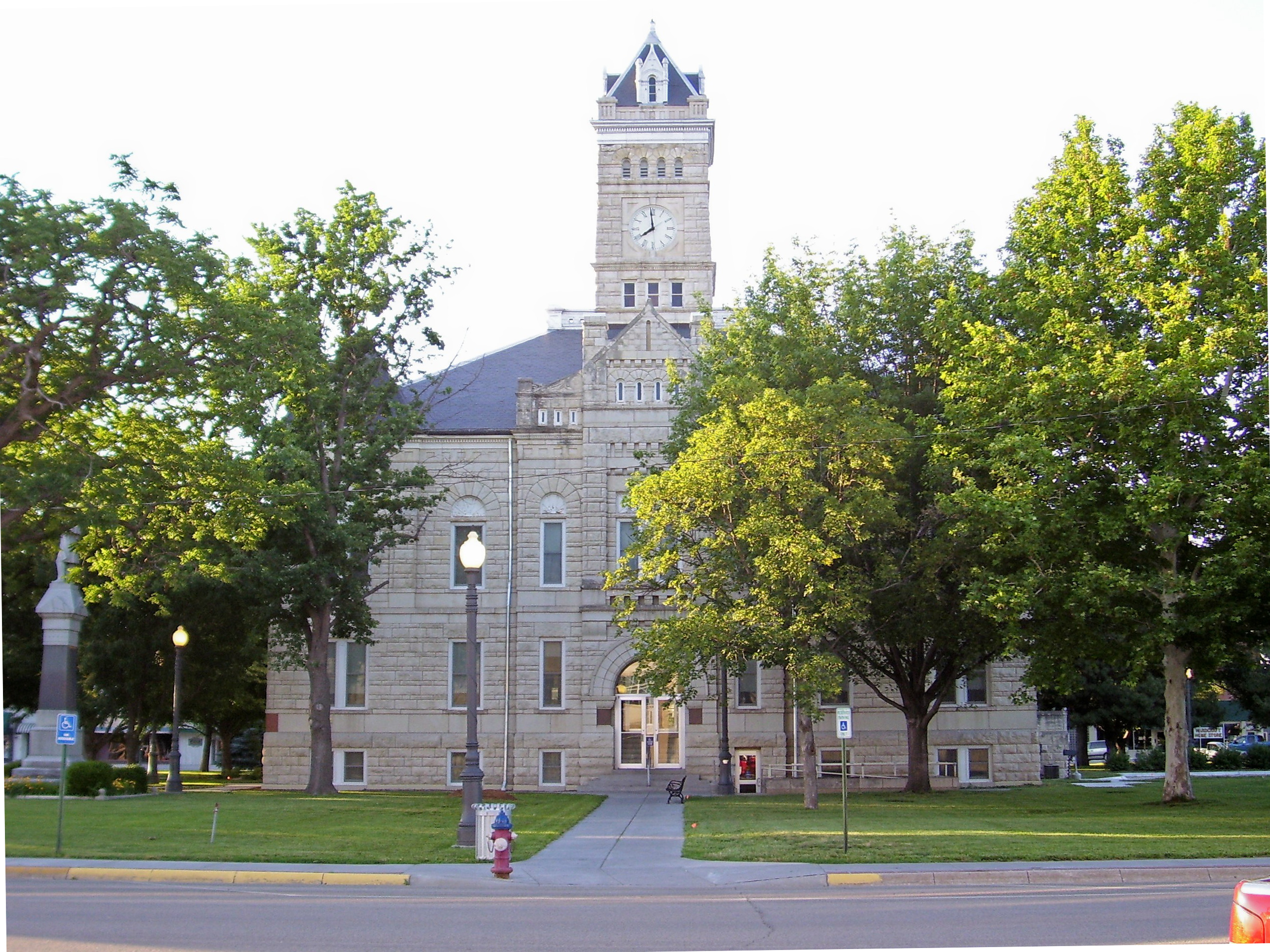
- The Clay County Courthouse in 2006

- Location within Kansas Location within the United States
- Location: 5th and Court Sts., Clay Center, Kansas
- Coordinates: 39°22′36″N 97°7′31″W
- Area: 1.5 acres (0.61 ha)
- Built: 1900–01
- Architect: J.C. Holland
- Architectural style: Romanesque
- NRHP reference No.: 73000746
- Added to NRHP: January 29, 1973

The Clay County Courthouse in Clay Center, Kansas was built during 1900–01. It was listed on the National Register of Historic Places in 1973.

It was designed by Topeka, Kansas architect J.C. Holland.

It is a two-story Romanesque Revival building upon a full basement. It is about 80 by 60 feet (24 m × 18 m) in plan and its main tower achieves a height of about 65 feet (20 m).
