= Jefferson County Courthouse (Nebraska) =

- U.S. National Register of Historic Places
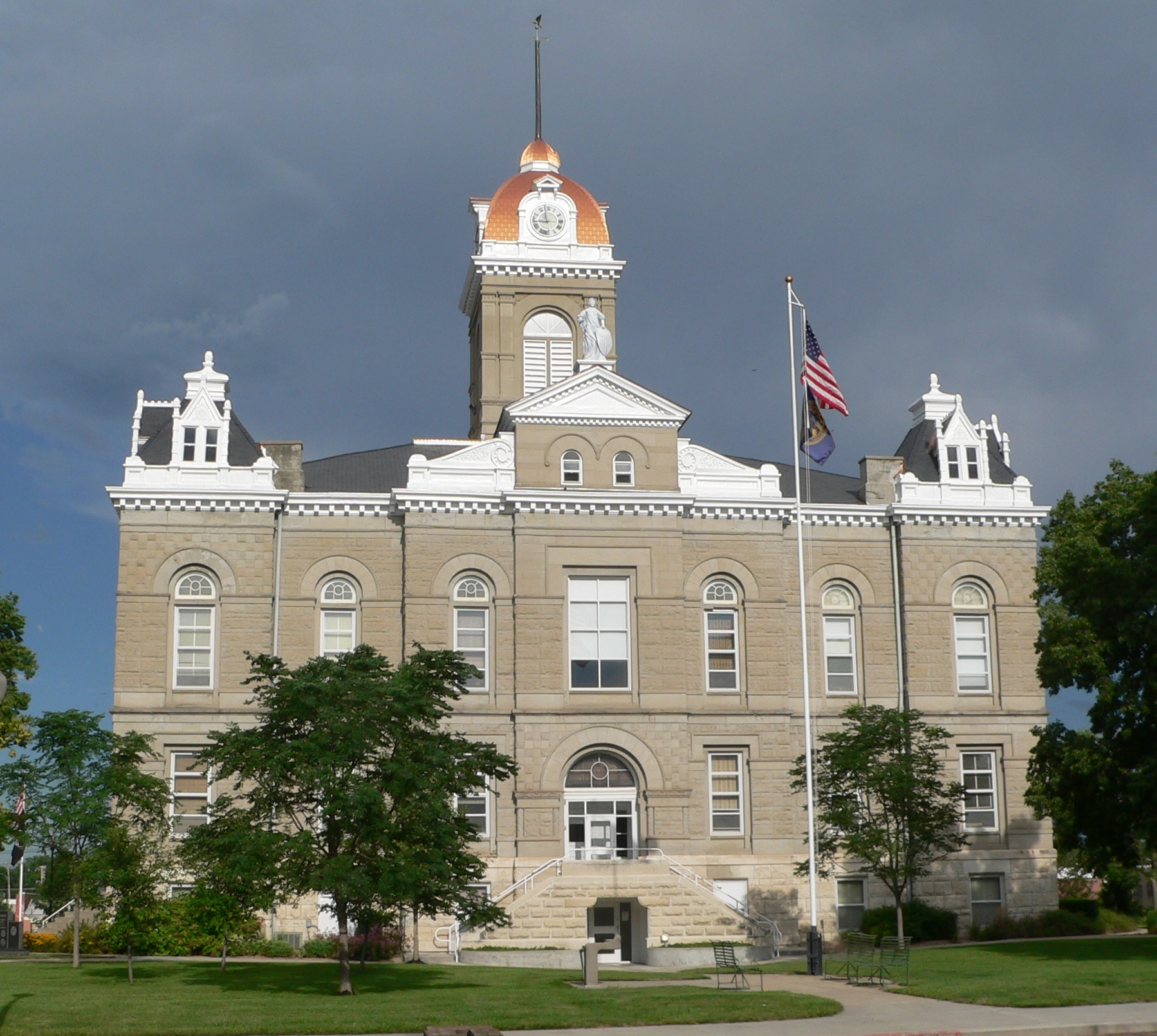
- The courthouse in 2010

- Location within Nebraska Location within the United States
- Location: Courthouse Square, Fairbury, Nebraska
- Coordinates: 40°08′08″N 97°10′49″W
- Built: 1890
- Architect: J. C. Holland
- Architectural style: Romanesque
- NRHP reference No.: 72000751
- Added to NRHP: November 27, 1972

The Jefferson County Courthouse is a historic building in Fairbury, Nebraska, and the courthouse of Jefferson County, Nebraska. It is the third building to house the courthouse; a first courthouse was built in 1873, and it was relocated to the opera house in 1882. The current courthouse was built in 1890. It was designed by architect J. C. Holland in the Romanesque Revival style, with "four faced clock tower - cupola, and four statues, one over each of the axial entrance." It has been listed on the National Register of Historic Places since November 27, 1972.
