= Topeka Lutheran School =

Location
- Topeka, Kansas; United States; 39°03′27″N 95°42′13″W

Information
- Type: Private elementary school
- Religious affiliation: Lutheranism
- Denomination: Lutheran Church–Missouri Synod
- Established: 1874; 152 years ago
- Closed: 2023
- Grades: K-8
- Accreditation: Kansas State Department of Education
- Website: topekalutheran.org

Topeka Lutheran School was a private Lutheran elementary school in Topeka, Kansas, in the United States. Founded in 1874 and closing in 2023, the school was affiliated with the Lutheran Church – Missouri Synod.

== History ==
Lutheran elementary schools in North America date back to the 1830s when Lutheran congregations established Christian day schools for their children. Topeka Lutheran School began operating in 1874 when the Rev. P. G. Germann, pastor of the newly established St. John's Lutheran Church, organized a private school in the church basement at 2nd and Harrison streets in Topeka. The school soon became a church project, and in 1885, the congregation built a two-room school house. St. John's Lutheran School continued to grow, and in 1888 they added a third room to the facility.

In 1919, the church bought three lots at 4th and Harrison in Topeka, and opened a new school at this location in 1922. By 1948, this facility had grown to a five-room operation and was quickly outgrowing it. So in 1949, the church purchased a plot of ground at 7th and Roosevelt.

On July 3, 1951, the Lutheran School Association, Topeka, Kansas, was organized by four congregations of the Lutheran Church – Missouri Synod in the Topeka area. At that time, St. John's Lutheran School became Topeka Lutheran School, and a new facility was opened at 701 SW Roosevelt in September 1952. The school continued to be located at 701 SW Roosevelt, although it has undergone several additions and remodeling projects since then. In April 2023, the school board voted to close the school, citing low enrollment and difficulty finding staff. At the time of its closing, three Topeka Lutheran congregations were associated with the school: St. John's, Faith, and Christ Lutheran churches.

== Current activities ==
Topeka Lutheran School is accredited by the Kansas State Department of Education and provides a parochial Lutheran education for kindergarten through 8th grade students. The school also supports a state licensed half-day preschool program as well as a full-day preschool/childcare program at the 701 Roosevelt campus. Additionally, the school has a separate campus at 1732 SW Gage in Topeka, which is known as the Center for Young Children (CYC). CYC was established in 1999 and is a state licensed childcare facility and preschool serving infant through pre-kindergarten children.

Topeka Lutheran School's curriculum is based on the guidelines of the State of Kansas and the Lutheran Church–Missouri Synod.

The Topeka Lutheran School Foundation was founded in 1971 to provide financial assistance to the school. The Foundation's endowment is a fund of assets invested so that a continuing source of income is available for the school's needs. The interest is then used for scholarship aid to students or capital and program improvements at the school.
