= Downtown Manhattan Historic District =

Historic district in Kansas, United States

- U.S. National Register of Historic Places
- U.S. Historic district
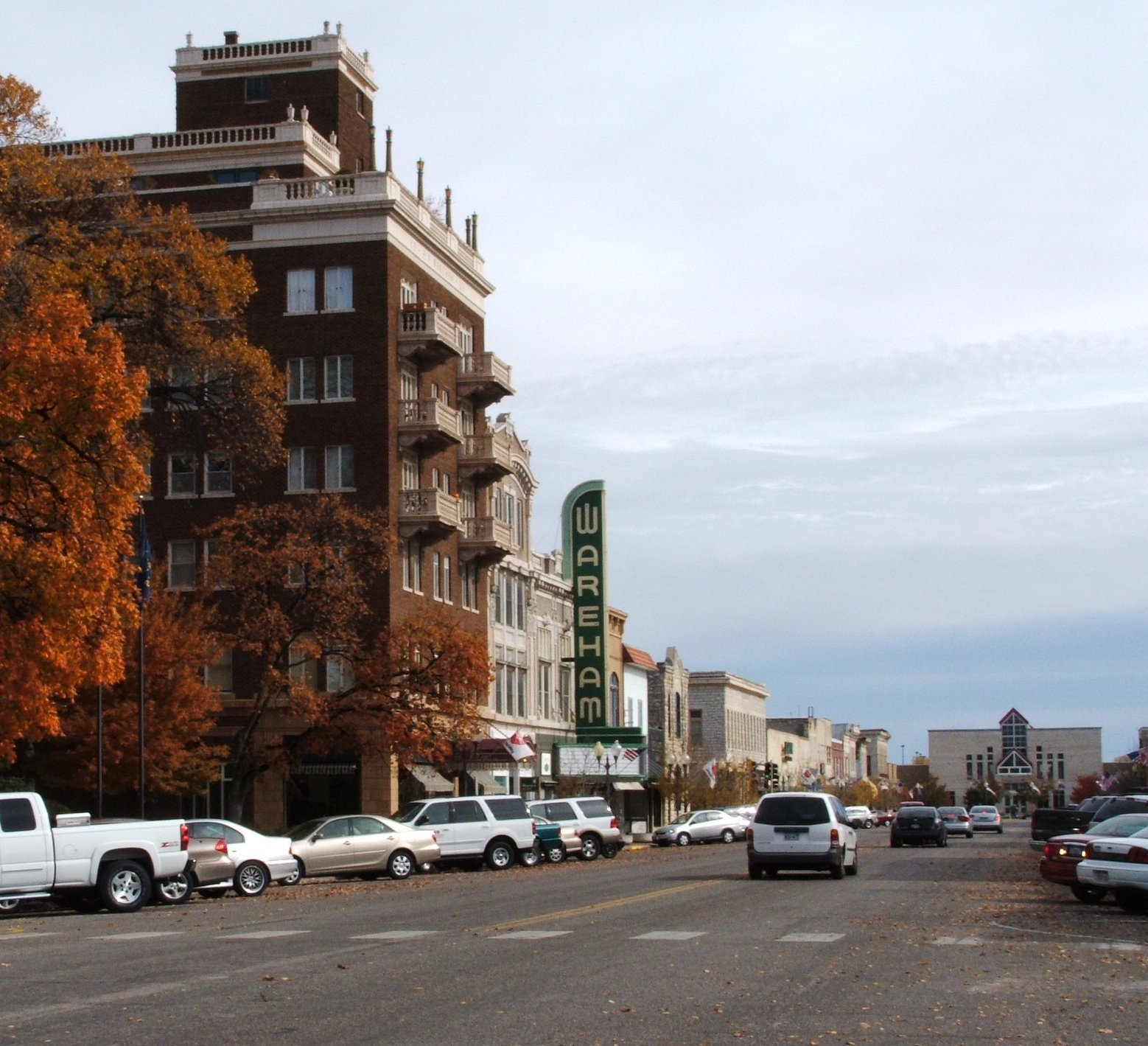

- Location within Kansas Location within the United States
- Location: Generally including the blocks bet. Humboldt and Pierre Sts. from 3rd to 5th Sts., Manhattan, Kansas
- Coordinates: 39°10′44″N 96°33′42″W
- Area: 25.8 acres (10.4 ha)
- Architect: J.C. Holland; F. Squires; et al.
- Architectural style: Early Commercial, Queen Anne, et al.
- NRHP reference No.: 06001240
- Added to NRHP: October 2, 2007

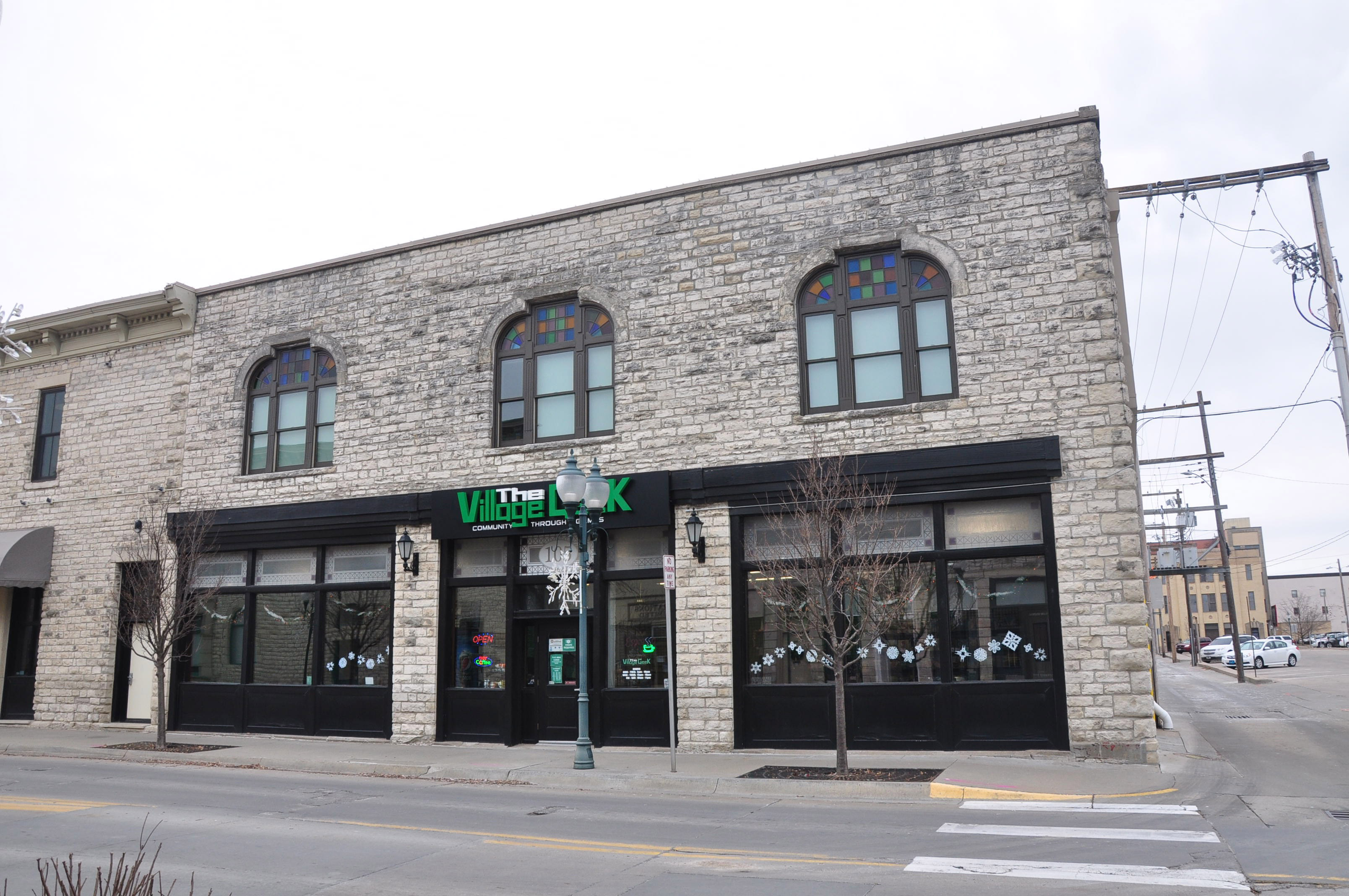
105 N 3rd St. Manhattan Kansas

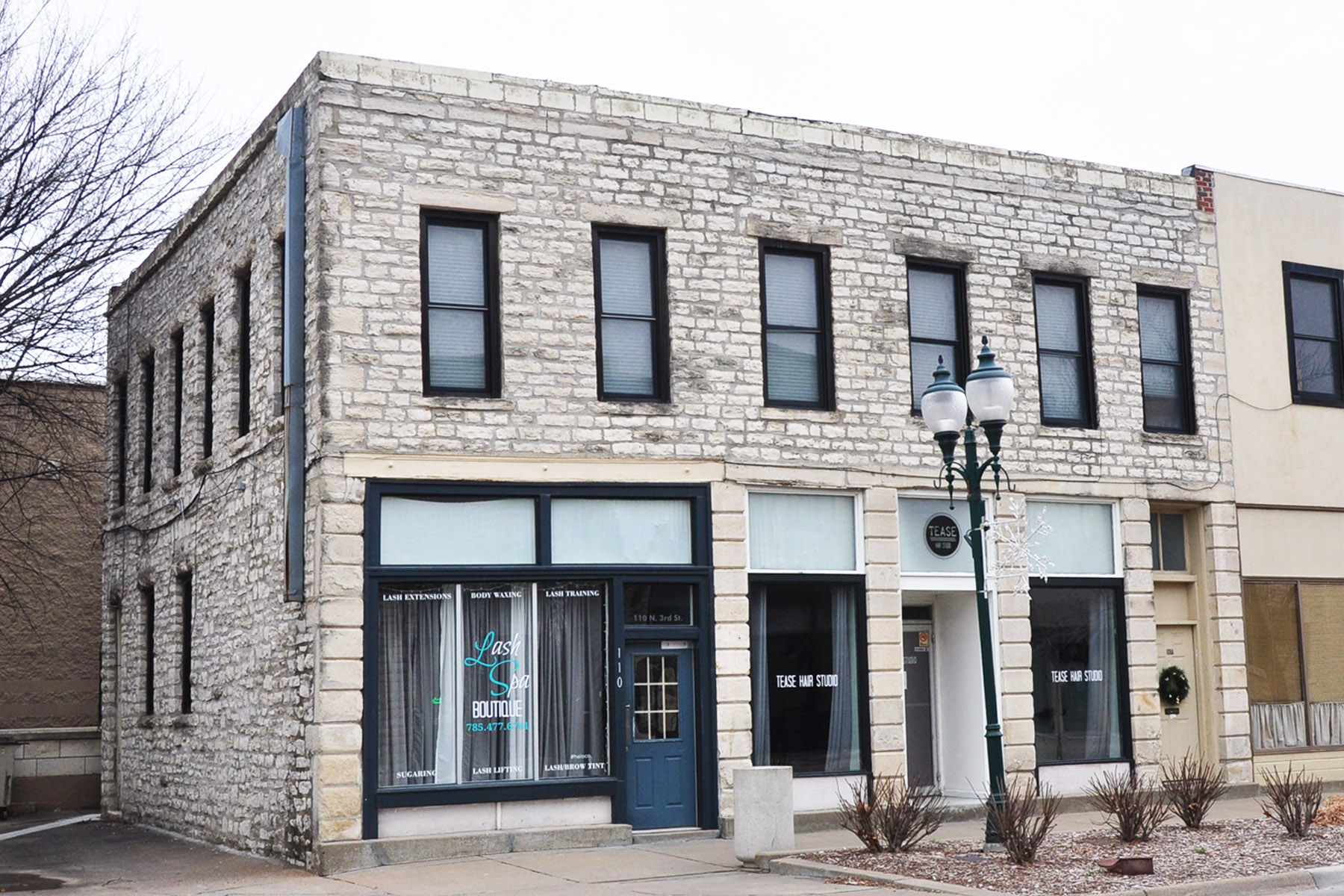
110 N 3rd St Manhattan Kansas

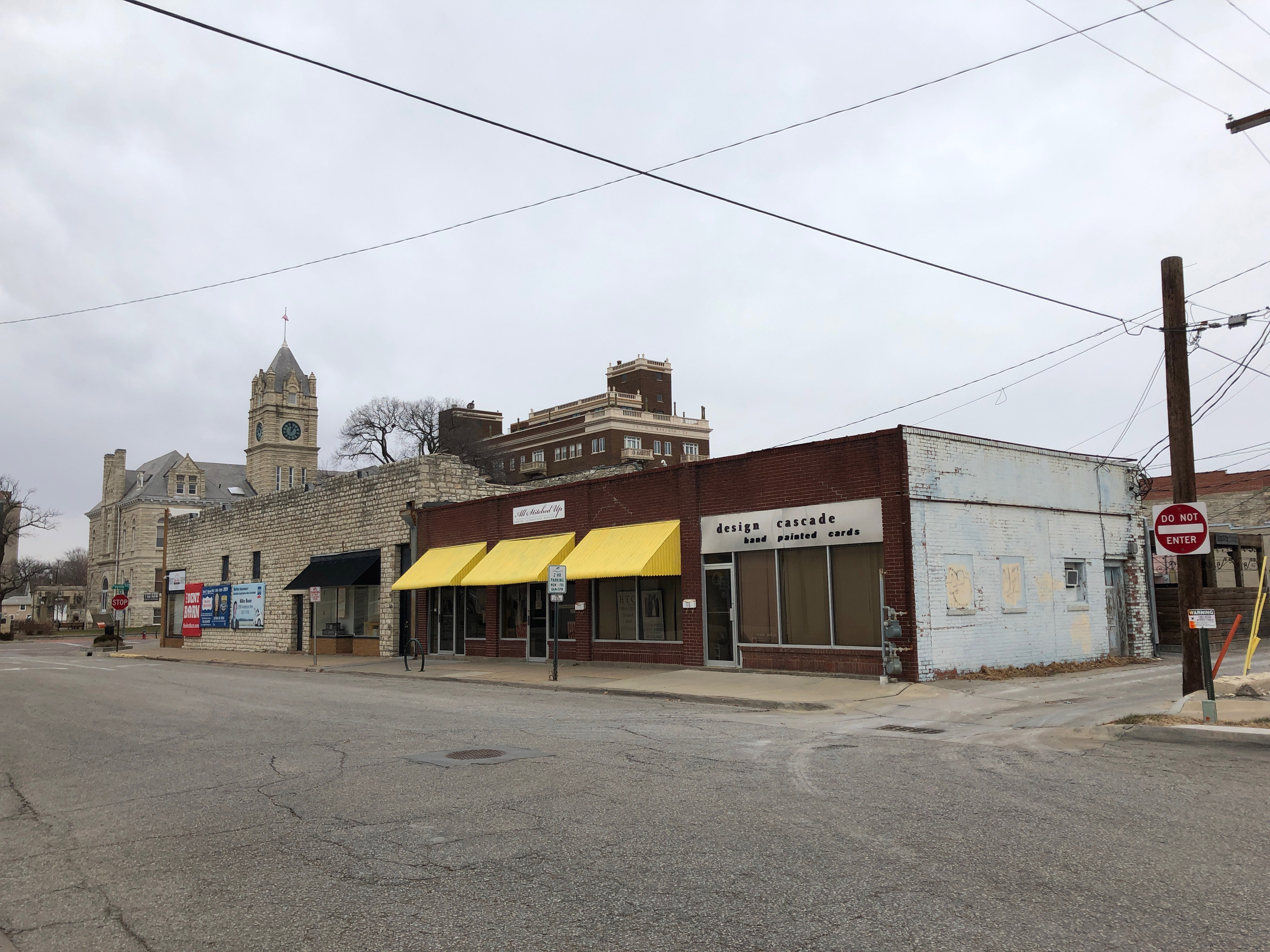
111-115 S 5th St. Manhattan Kansas

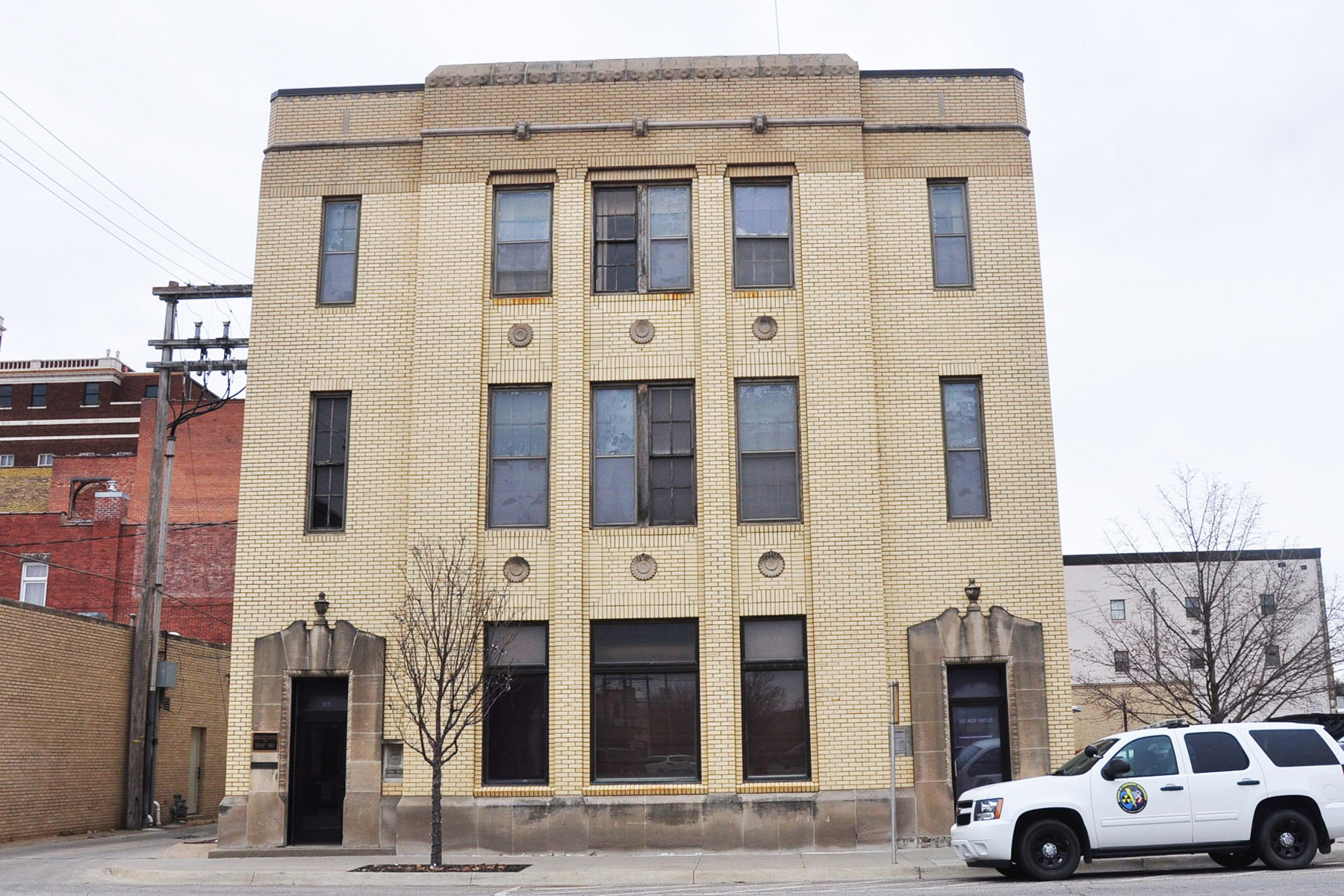
Telephone Co Building 115 N 4th St Manhattan Kansas

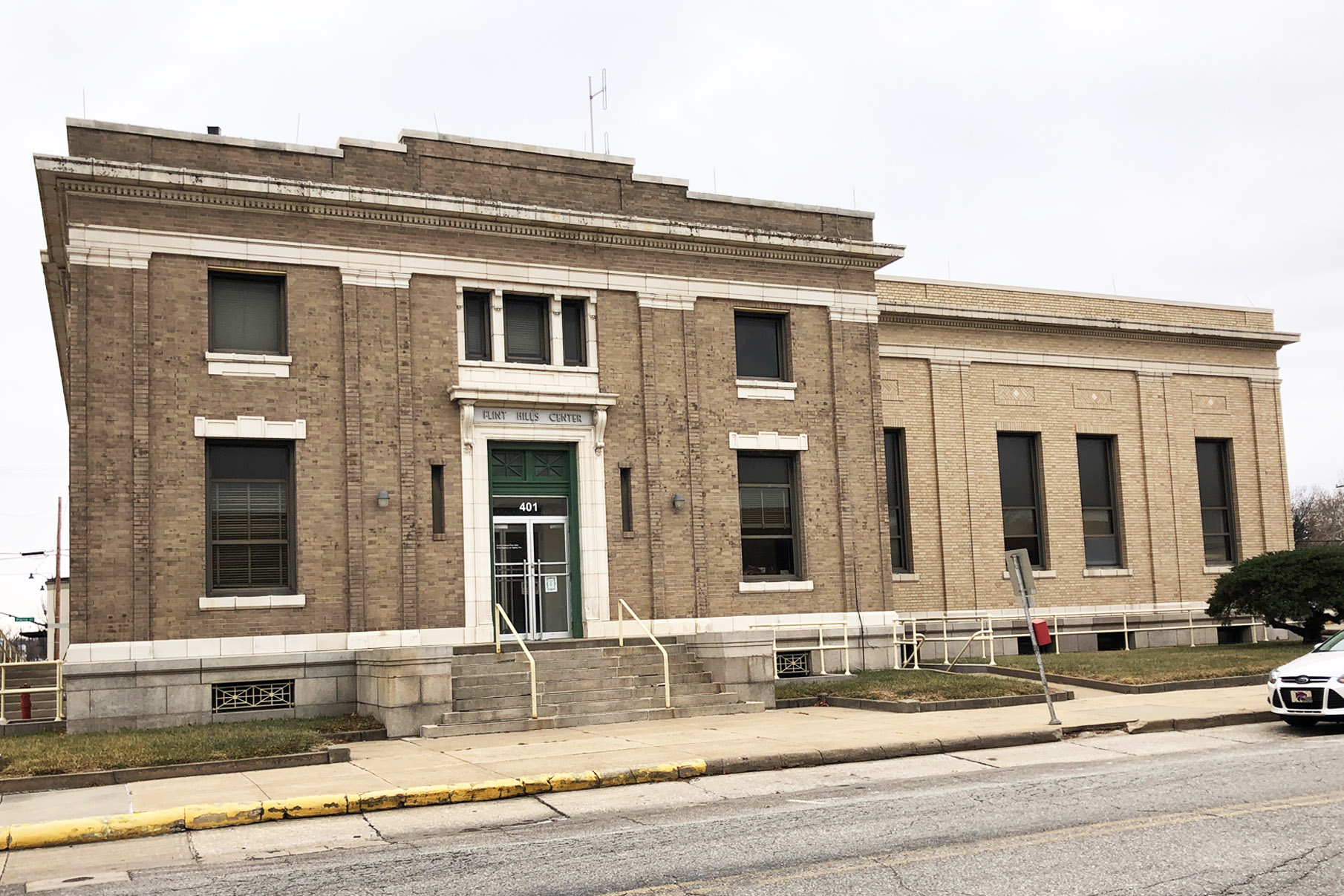
US Post Office Bldg 401 Houston Manhattan Kansas

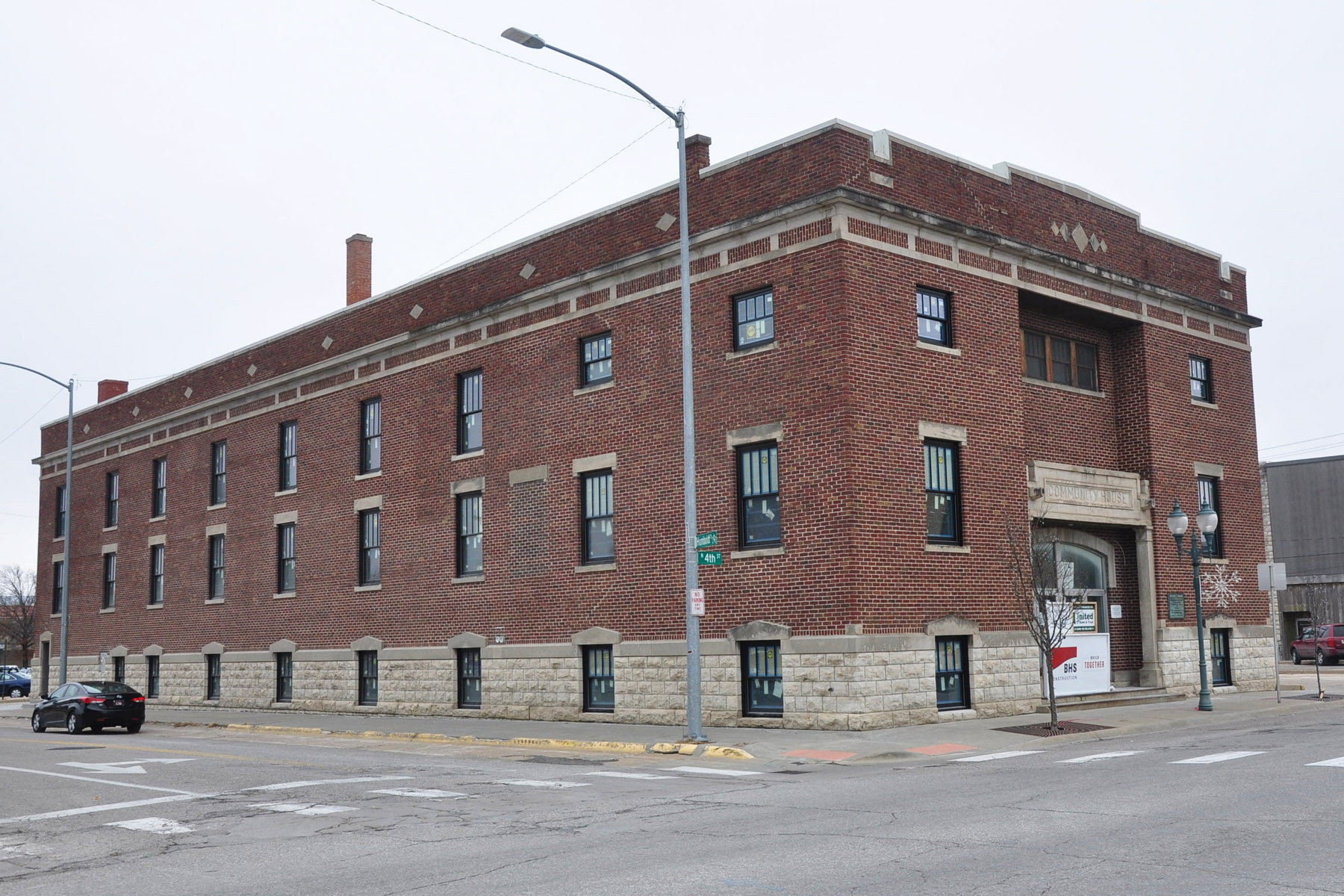
Community House bldg 120 N 4th St Manhattan Kansas

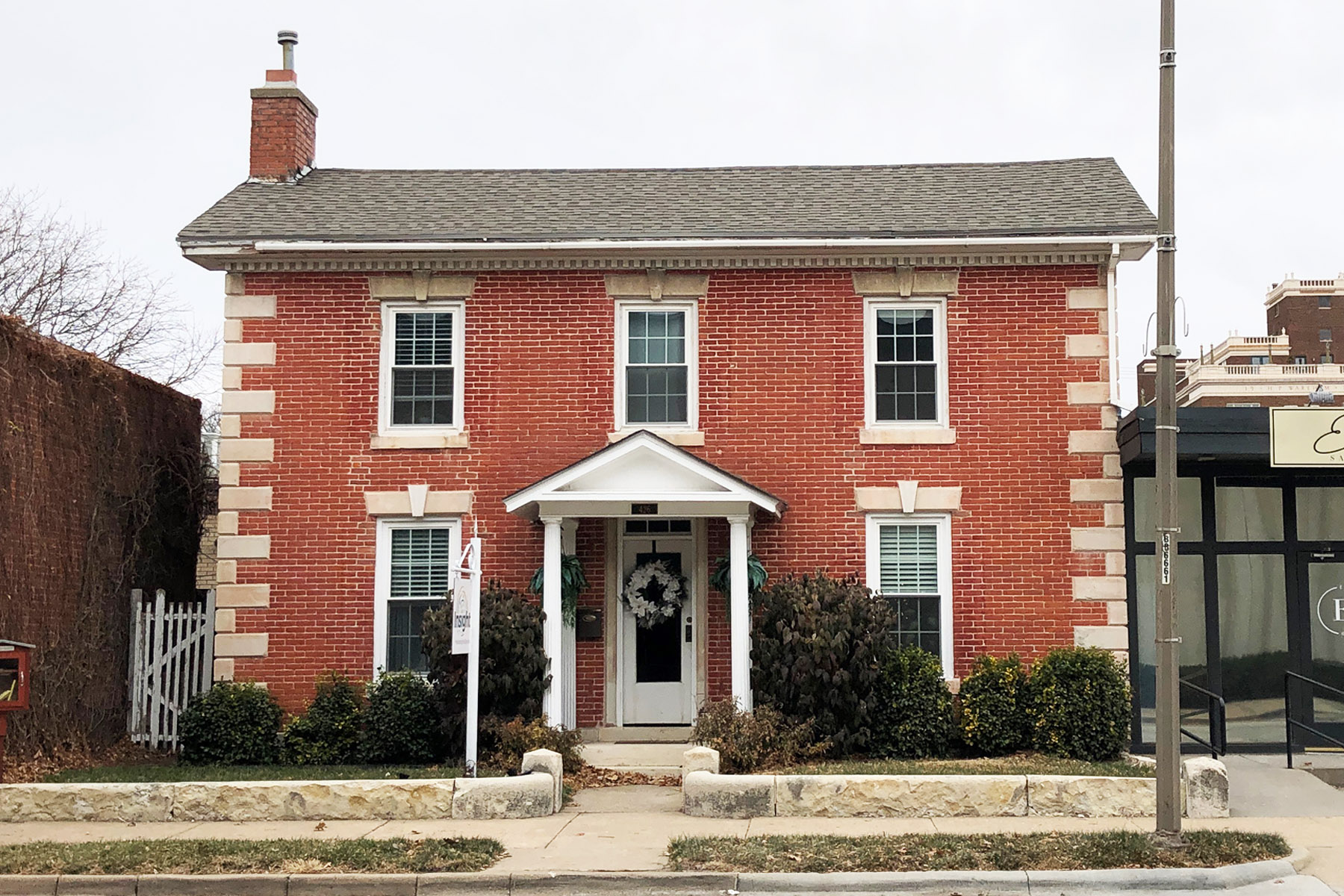
Powers Residence 426 Houston St. Manhattan Kansas

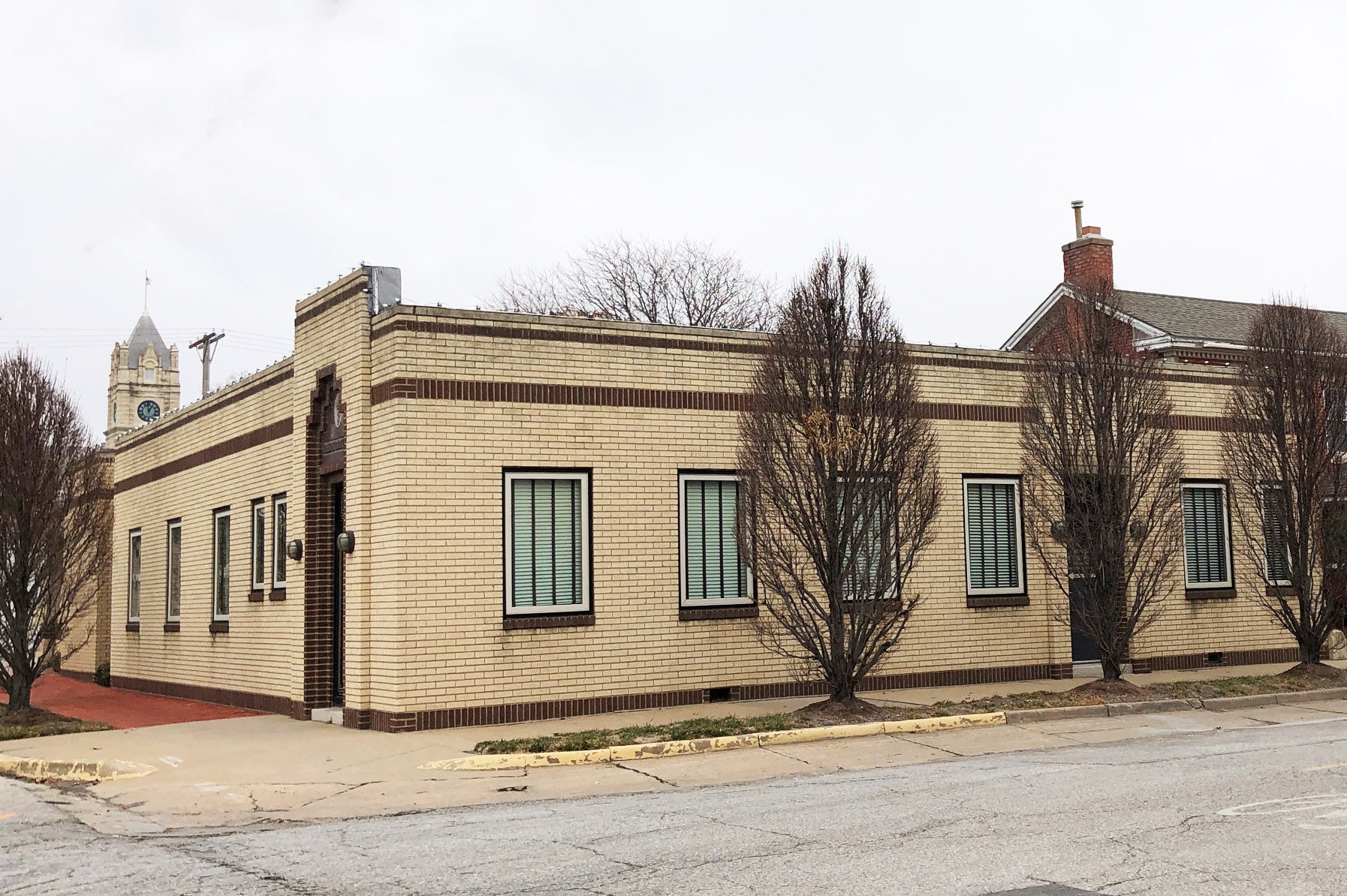
Ball Clinic Building 428 Houston St. Manhattan Kansas

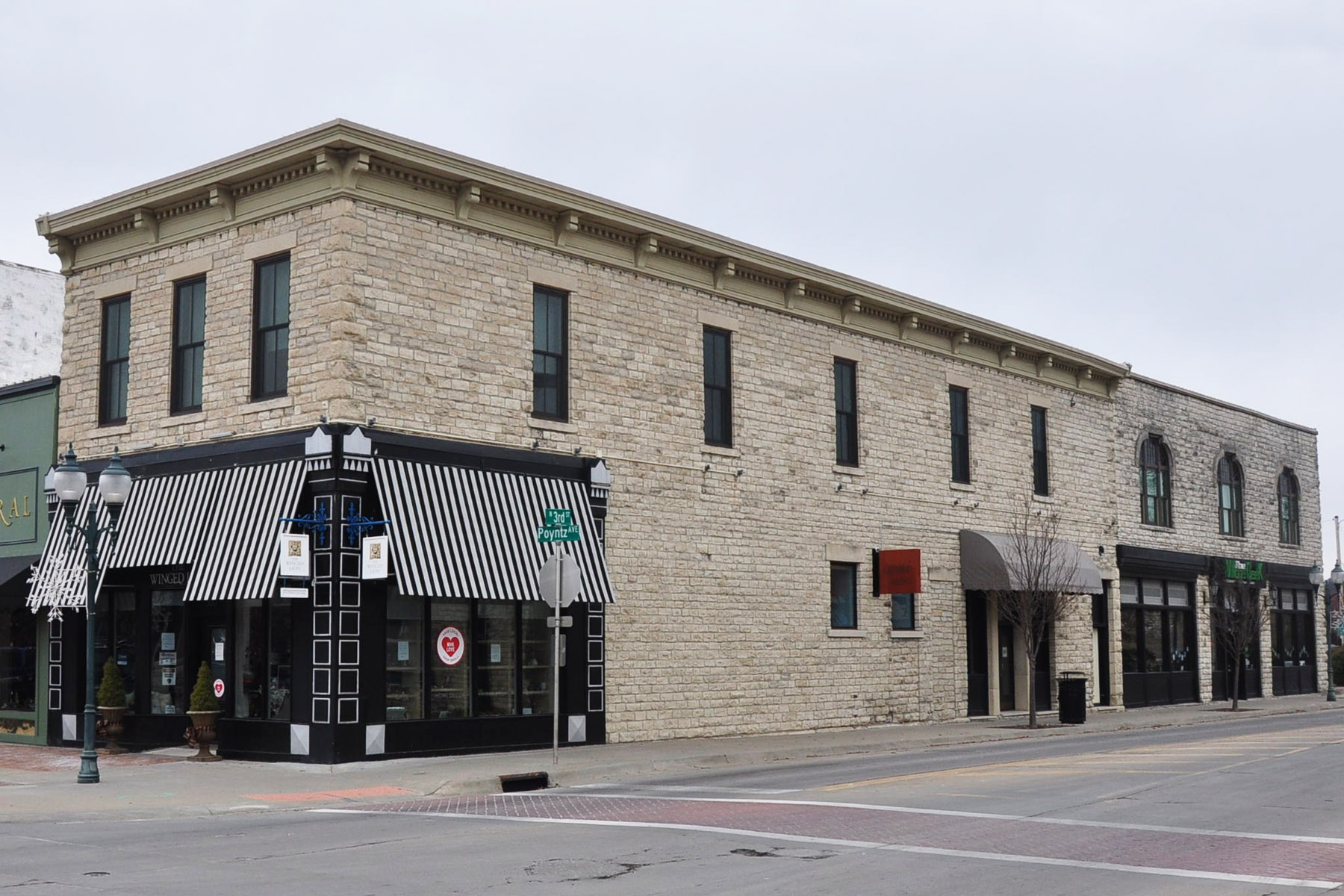
Orville Huntress Building 300 Poyntz Ave Manhattan Kansas

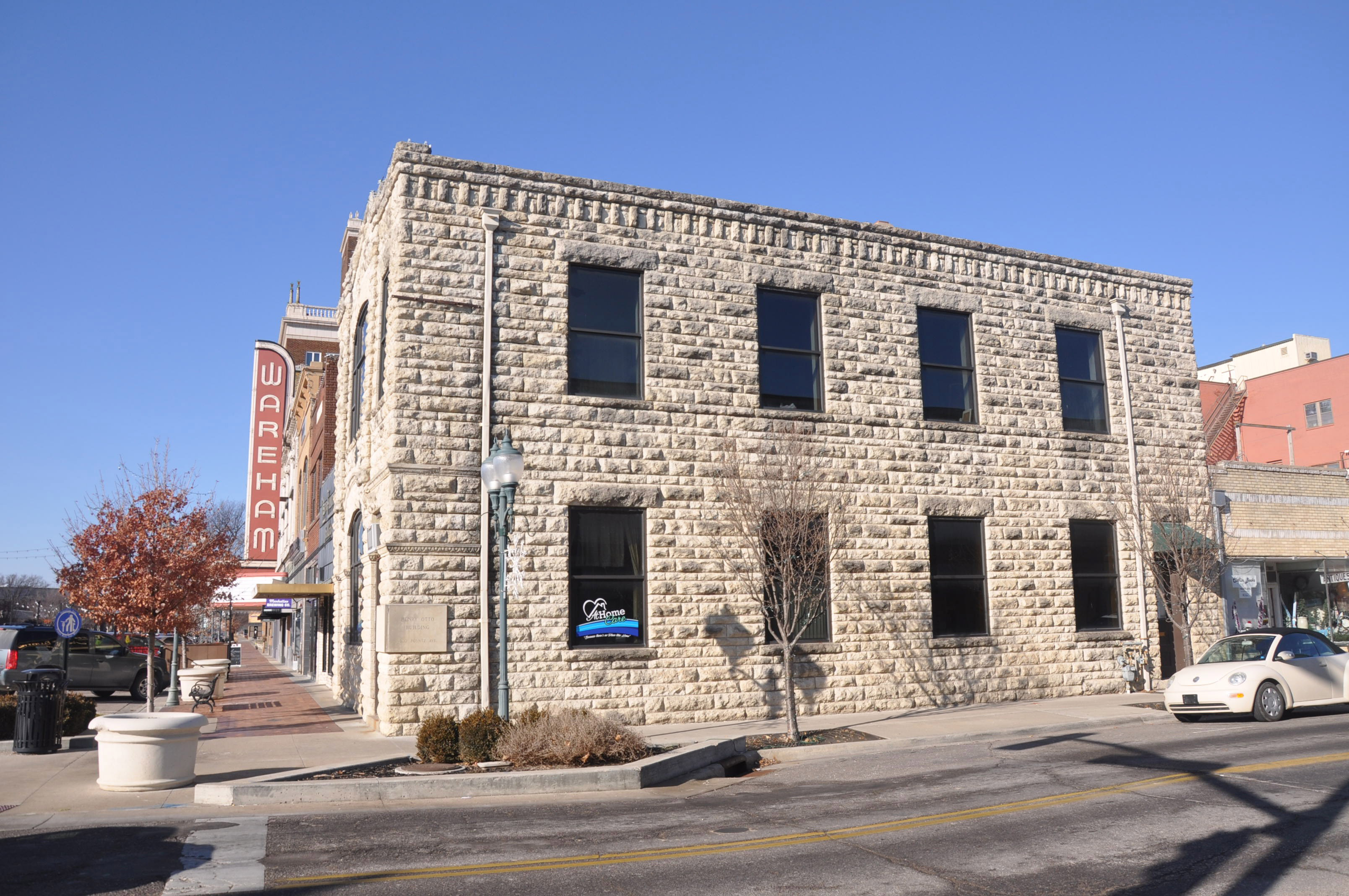
Manhattan State Bank Building 400 Poyntz Ave Manhattan Kansas

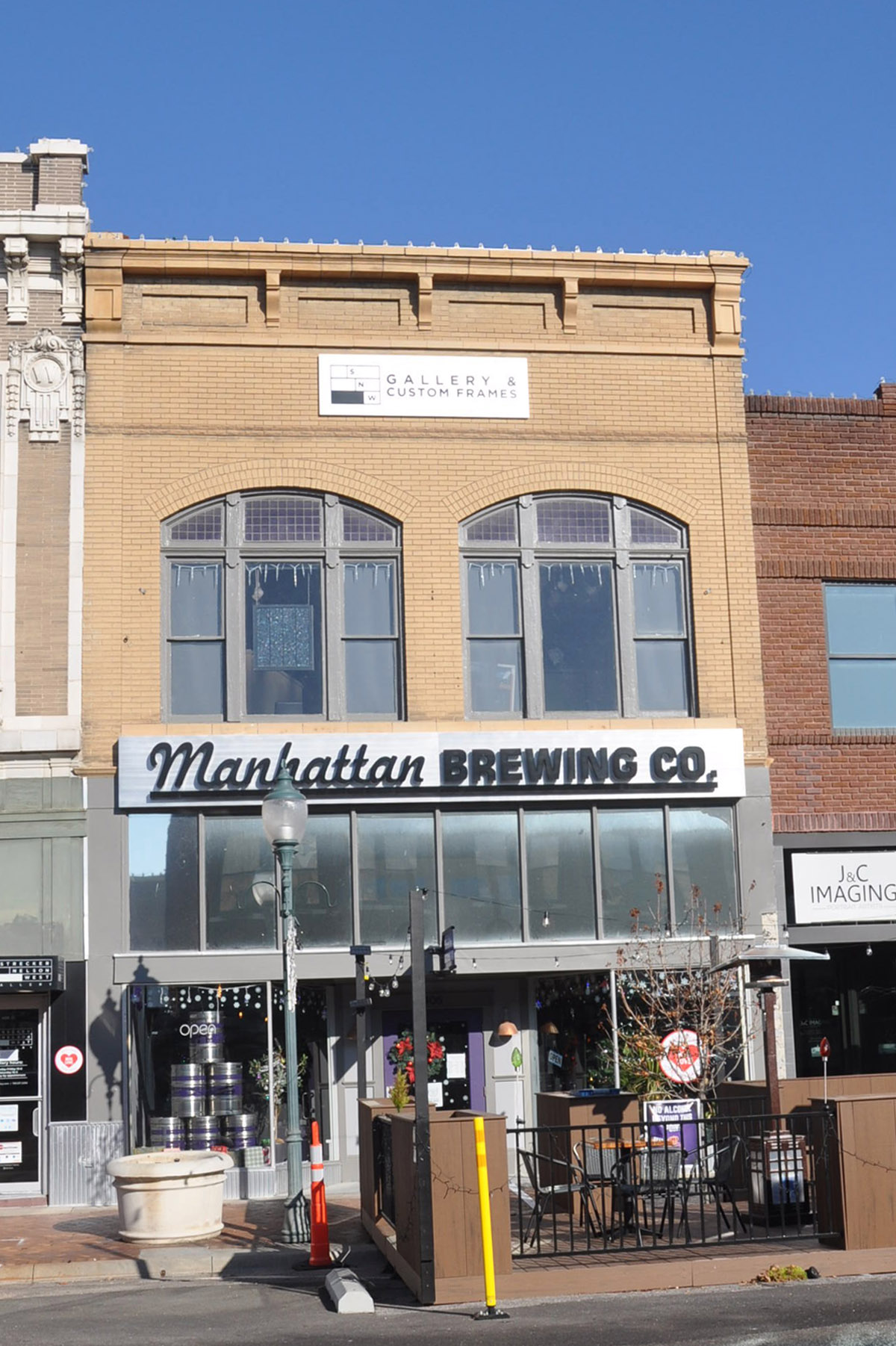
Smith Building 406 Poyntz Ave Manhattan Kansas

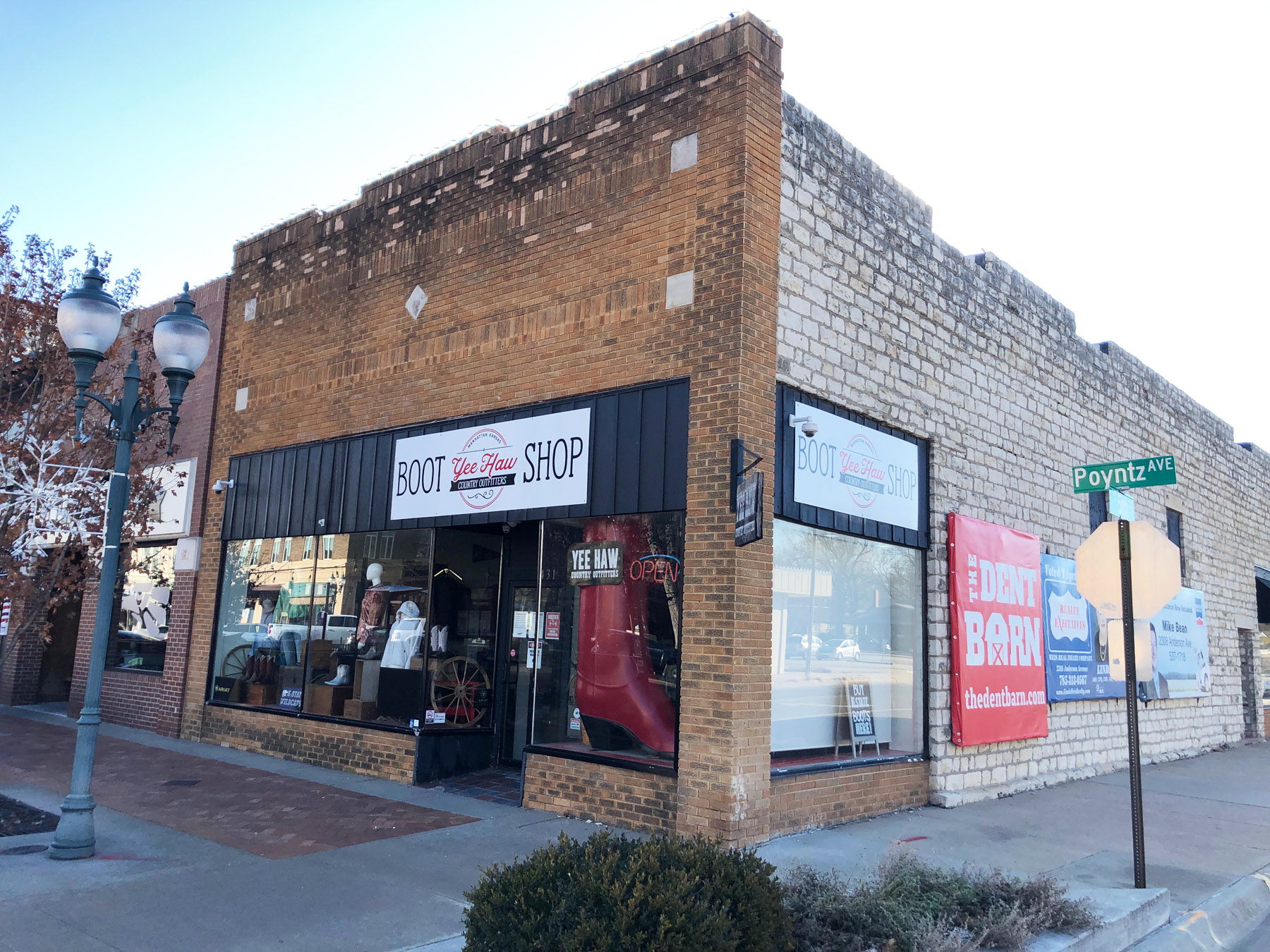
Manhattan Grange Building 431 Poyntz Ave Manhattan Kansas

The Downtown Manhattan Historic District in Manhattan, Kansas is a 25.8 acres (10.4 ha) historic district which was listed on the National Register of Historic Places in 2007. The district generally includes the blocks between Humboldt and Pierre Sts. from 3rd to 5th Sts.

The district includes 48 contributing buildings and 15 non-contributing buildings. Selected buildings are:

- Manhattan State Bank Building (1906), 400 Poyntz
- Wareham Hall (Formerly the Wareham Theater) (1910), 408-412 Poyntz

== Local designation and naming ==
The Downtown Manhattan Historic District was first designated as a Certified Local Historic District in 1982, nearly 25 years before its listing on the National Register of Historic Places in 2007. It encompasses just over six blocks of downtown Manhattan, Kansas, preserving a rich concentration of historic commercial and civic architecture.

In July 1855, the townsite of Manhattan was platted. The east–west street later developed as the district’s commercial core was named Poyntz Avenue, after Colonel Poyntz, an investor in the steamboat Hartford. The adjacent street to the south was named for Sam Houston, recognized as one of the area’s first white settlers.

== Contemporary use ==
The Downtown Manhattan Historic District remains a vibrant cultural and entertainment hub. Centered along Poyntz Avenue, the district features a variety of restaurants, breweries, cafés, and venues, anchoring downtown as a gathering place for both locals and visitors.

== Cultural events ==
Downtown regularly hosts community-oriented arts and cultural events—such as Third Thursdays and the Plein Air on Poyntz Art Walk—which bring together residents, artists, and businesses through public exhibitions and performances.

== Wareham Hall and community revitalization ==
The historic Wareham Theatre is undergoing redevelopment into Wareham Hall, a non-profit, multi‐purpose mid‐sized venue that will enable performances including concerts, theater, and comedy shows. The city supports this roughly $40 million project through philanthropy, tax incentives and historic tax credits, signaling a strategic investment in enhancing downtown’s cultural infrastructure.
