= St. John's Lutheran School =

- U.S. National Register of Historic Places
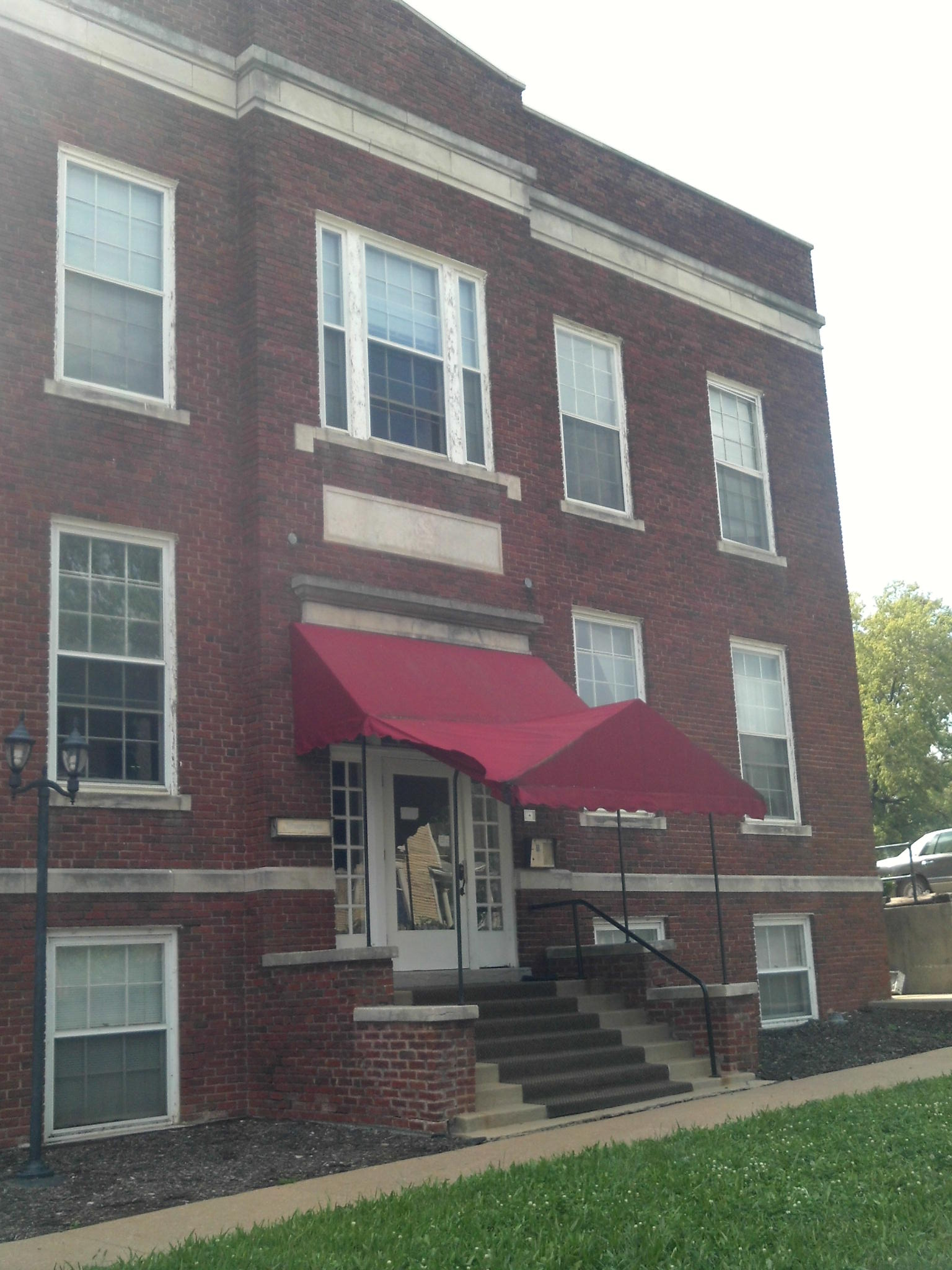
- St. John's Lutheran School in 2014

- Location within Kansas Location within the United States
- Location: 315 W. 4th St., Topeka, Kansas
- Coordinates: 39°3′19″N 95°40′32″W
- Area: Less than one acre
- Built: 1919–20
- Built by: Senne Construction Co.
- Architect: Frank C. Squires
- Architectural style: Eclectic Free Classicism
- NRHP reference No.: 85000014
- Added to NRHP: January 3, 1985

St. John's Lutheran School (also known as the Johannes Arms Apartments) is a historic Lutheran school building at 315 W. 4th Street in Topeka, Kansas, United States. It was built between 1919 and 1922 and added to the National Register of Historic Places in 1985. Until 1949 it was home to the present-day Topeka Lutheran School.

It was deemed "primarily significant as an exceptionally-intact example of the institutional architecture of Frank C. Squires, a prominent Topeka architect who practiced in the early decades of the twentieth century. Additionally, it is locally significant for its historical contributions to education in Topeka."
