= Howard National Bank =

Historic building in Howard, Kansas, USA

Coordinates: 37.4699°N 96.2633°W

Howard National Bank in 2026

Howard National Bank is a historic bank 1888 building in Howard, Kansas. The bank was organized in 1877 with George W. McKey as president. It is listed on the National Register of Historic Places. It is at 143-149 North Wabash.

Architect Charles W. Squires of Emporia, Kansas, designed the rusticated stone castle-like Richardsonian Romanesque building.

In 1888 George W. McKey was president. In 1907 Noyce Barber served as its president. State senator Ralph Perkins also served as its president.

The Elk County Preservation Society is working to preserve it.

== See also ==
- National Register of Historic Places listings in Kansas
