= Dodge City station =

Train station in Kansas

Dodge City, KS
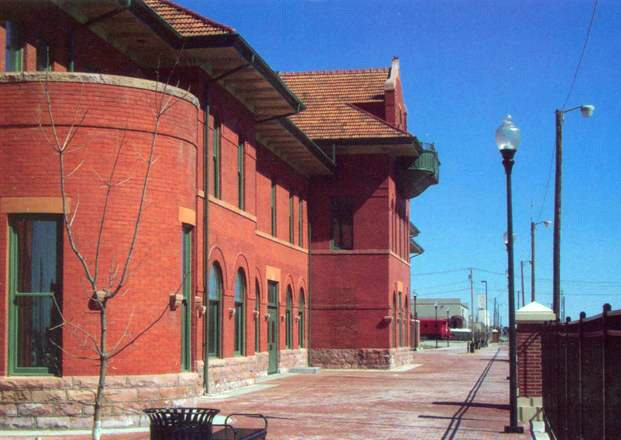
- Dodge City station in October 2008

General information
- Location: Central Avenue and East Wyatt Earp Street; Dodge City, Kansas
- Line: BNSF La Junta Subdivision
- Platforms: 1 side platform, 1 island platform
- Tracks: 2
- Connections: D-TRAN

Construction
- Parking: Yes

Other information
- Station code: Amtrak: DDG

History
- Rebuilt: 1896

Passengers
- FY 2025: 4,682 (Amtrak)

Services
Preceding station	Amtrak	Following station
Garden City toward Los Angeles	Southwest Chief	Hutchinson toward Chicago
Former services
Preceding station	Atchison, Topeka and Santa Fe Railway	Following station
Howell toward Los Angeles	Main Line	Wright toward Chicago
Montezuma toward Boise City	Boise City – Dodge City	Terminus
- Atchison, Topeka and Santa Fe Railway Depot
- U.S. National Register of Historic Places
- Location: Dodge City, Kansas, USA
- Coordinates: 37.7524°N 100.0163°W
- Built: 1896
- Architect: J.C. Holland; Fellows & Van Sant builders
- Architectural style: Romanesque
- NRHP reference No.: 00000791
- Added to NRHP: July 14, 2000
Location

Dodge City station is an Amtrak train station in Dodge City, Kansas, United States, served by the daily Southwest Chief.

== History ==
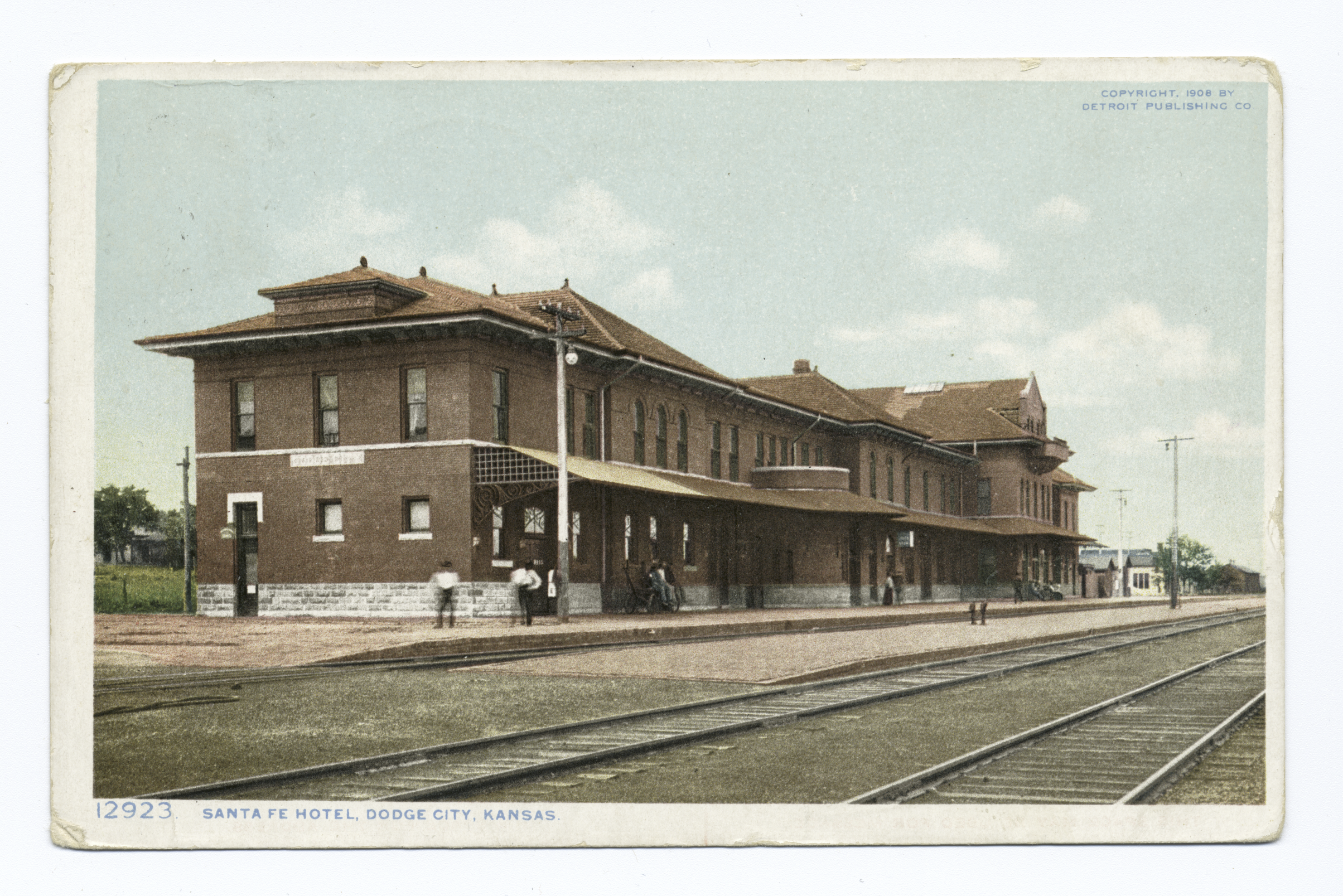
Circa-1909 postcard of the station

The original station structure was built by the Atchison, Topeka and Santa Fe Railway in 1896 to a design by architect James C. Holland and Company, a Topeka firm, in the Richardsonian Romanesque architectural style. Dodge City's importance as a division point on the railroad, with yards, a roundhouse and shops, and as the last significant rest stop for westbound passengers before a large undeveloped region, led the railroad to build a large structure with a Harvey House lunchroom and dining room.

The station was added to and remodeled several times in the style of the original structure. An addition was made between 1907 and 1909 to the first and second floors on the west end to add hotel rooms. An addition built between 1912 and 1914 to first and second floors of the east end added railway employee offices and sleeping spaces, and expanded the Harvey House lunchroom and dining room. The north facade was changed and a basement added for Harvey House food preparation and storage between 1924 and 1925. The station is of two stories with a three-story center section, constructed of stone, red-brick and terra cotta.

The station was added to the National Register of Historic Places in 2000 for its historical significance in the growth of Dodge City and its association with the Atchison, Topeka and Santa Fe, and for its architectural significance as the finest example of Romanesque design in Dodge City. The station has been renovated and restored, and is also used as a theater and for other recreational, cultural, and social uses.
