= Marion County Courthouse (Kansas) =

- U.S. National Register of Historic Places
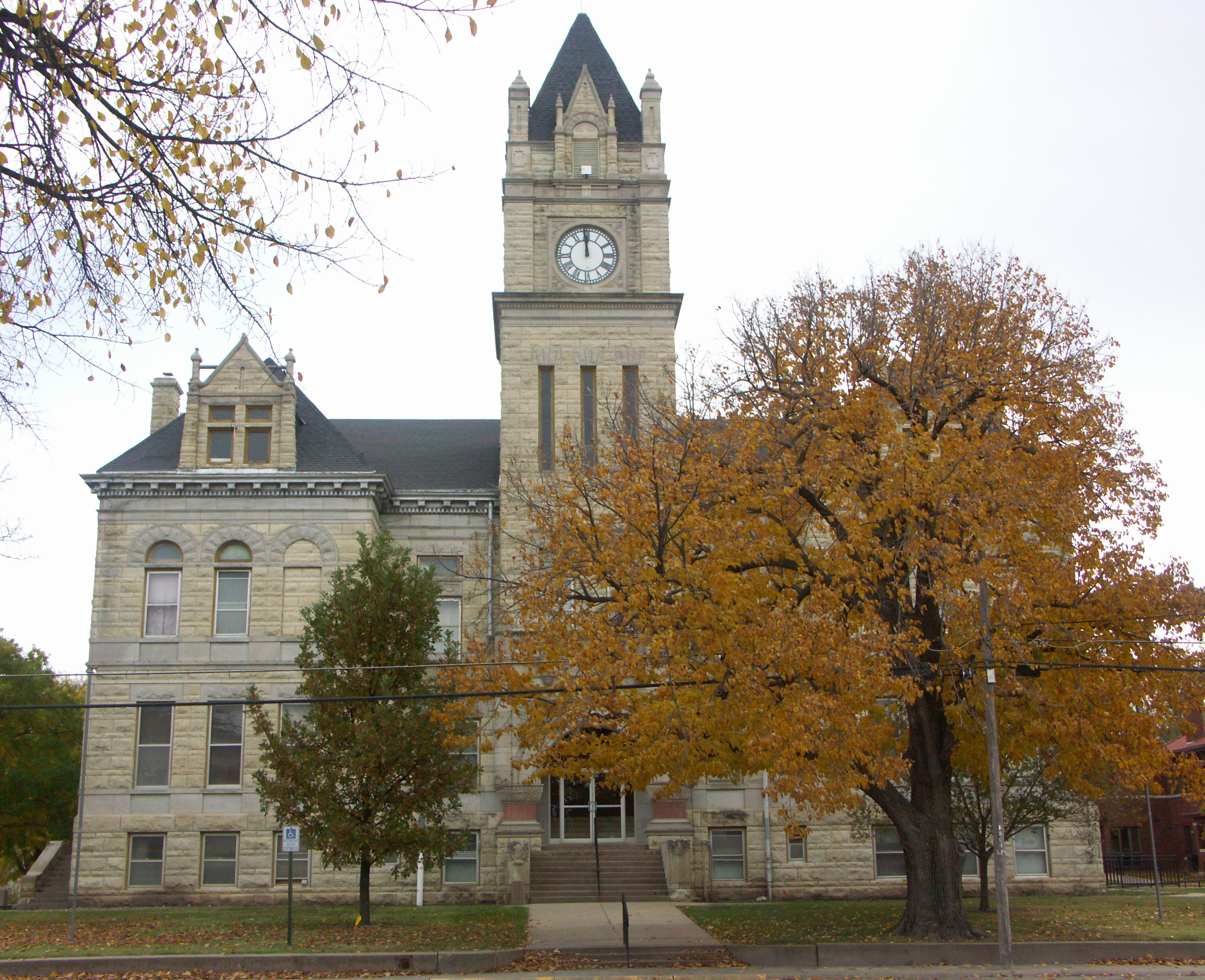
- Marion County Courthouse in Marion

- Location within Kansas Location within the United States
- Location: 3rd and Williams Sts., Marion, Kansas
- Coordinates: 38°20′50″N 97°1′9″W
- Area: 2 acres (0.81 ha)
- Built: 1906
- Architects: Holland, J.C.; Squires, Frank
- Architectural style: Romanesque, Richardsonian Romanesque
- NRHP reference No.: 76000828
- Added to NRHP: May 28, 1976

The Marion County Courthouse, located at 3rd and Williams Streets in Marion, Kansas, was built in 1906. It was listed on the National Register of Historic Places in 1976.

It was designed by J.C. Holland and Frank Squires in Richardsonian Romanesque style.
