= Burr Oak United Methodist Church =

Historic church in Kansas, United States

- U.S. National Register of Historic Places
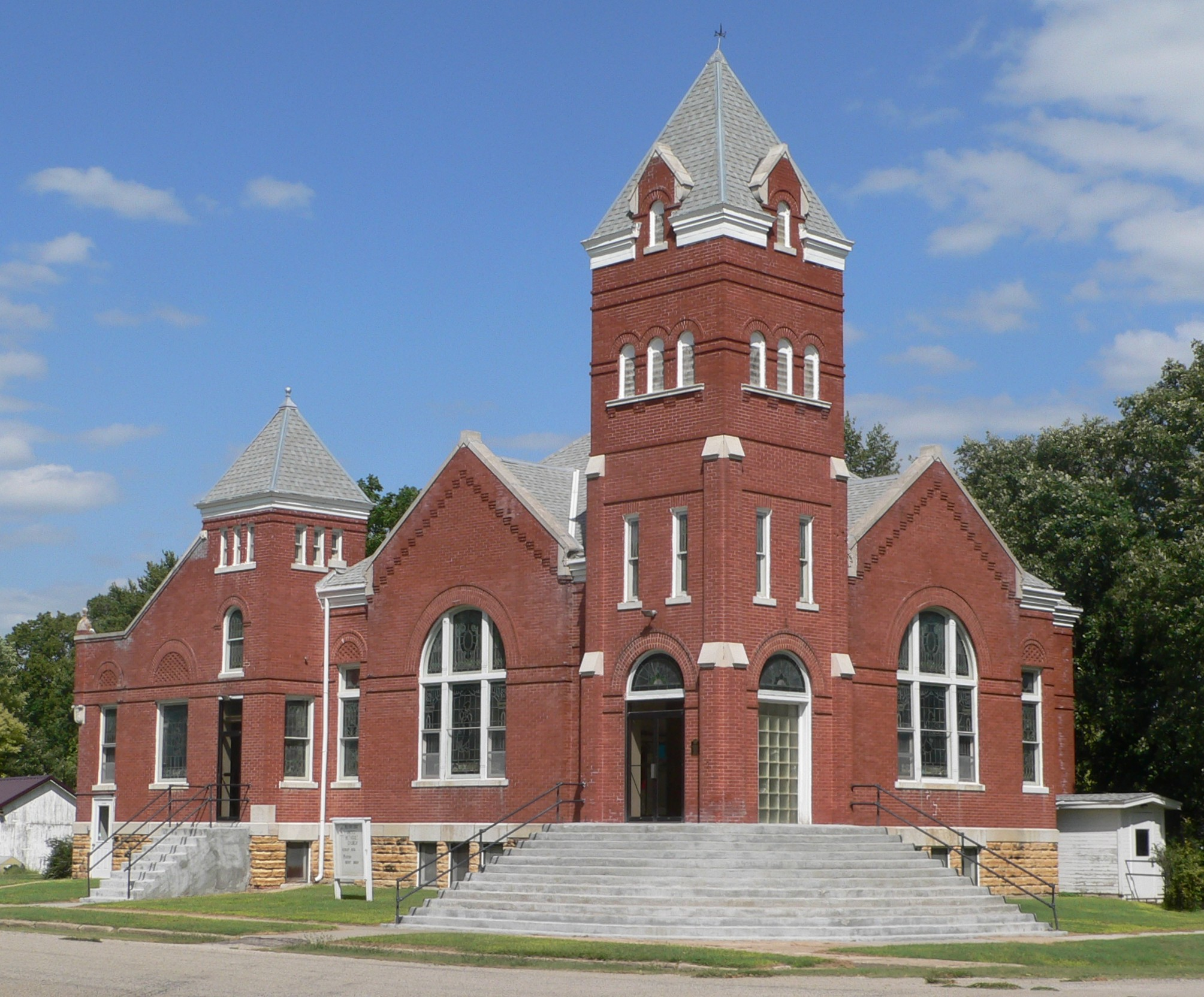
- View from the southwest

- Location within Kansas Location within the United States
- Location: NE corner Pennsylvania & Washington Sts., Burr Oak, Kansas
- Coordinates: 39°52′9″N 98°18′12.4″W
- Built: 1912
- Built by: M.E. Brady
- Architect: J.C. Holland
- Architectural style: Romanesque
- NRHP reference No.: 07001225
- Added to NRHP: November 28, 2007

The Burr Oak United Church is a church at the northeast corner of Pennsylvania and Washington Streets in Burr Oak, Kansas. It was built in 1912 and added to the National Register of Historic Places in 2007. It was a United Methodist Church until June 20, 2023, but left the denomination in anticipating of combining with other community churches.

It is a two-story, red brick and limestone structure with a hipped roof. It was deemed notable as "a late Victorian example of Richardson[ian] Romanesque architecture in a small Kansas town."
