= Rooks County Courthouse =

- U.S. National Register of Historic Places
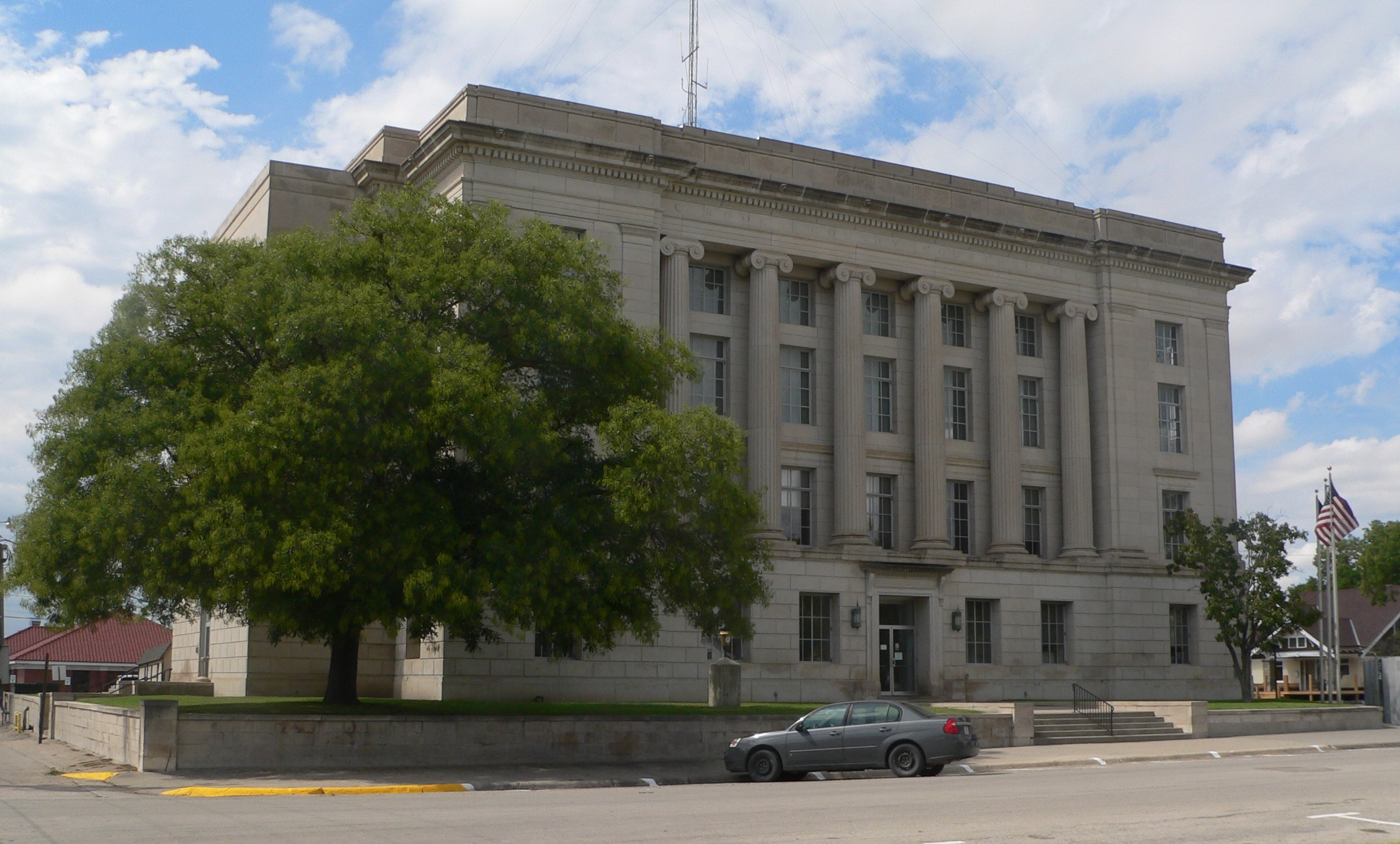
- Rooks County Courthouse in 2014

- Location within Kansas Location within the United States
- Location: 115 N. Walnut St., Stockton, Kansas
- Coordinates: 39°26′15″N 99°16′27″W
- Area: Less than one acre
- Built by: Cuthbert and Sons
- Architect: Frank C. Squires
- Architectural style: Classical Revival
- MPS: County Courthouses of Kansas MPS
- NRHP reference No.: 02000400
- Added to NRHP: April 26, 2002

Rooks County Courthouse is located at 115 N. Walnut St. in Stockton, Kansas, United States. It was listed on the National Register of Historic Places in 2002.

It was designed by architect Frank C. Squires and was built by Cuthbert and Sons. It is a four-story Classical Revival-style building which is 97 by 77 feet (30 m × 23 m) in plan and 45 feet (14 m) tall.
