= D-TRAN =

Provider of mass transportation in Ford County, Kansas

- Headquarters: 201 E Wyatt Earp Blvd.
- Locale: Dodge City, Kansas
- Service area: Ford County, Kansas
- Service type: Bus service, paratransit
- Routes: 3
- Stops: 55
- Hubs: Santa Fe Depot Transit Center; Walmart Midpoint Transfer
- Fleet: 5 buses
- Annual ridership: 31,292 (2024)
- Website: D-TRAN

D-TRAN is the primary provider of mass transportation in Dodge City, Kansas with three routes serving the region. As of 2019, the system provided 31,292 rides over 13,008 annual vehicle revenue hours with 5 buses and 3 paratransit vehicles.

== History ==
While dial-a-ride transit service was available in Dodge City previously, fixed-route public transit began on May 11, 2015, following the recommendations of a fixed route bus study.

== Service ==
D-TRAN operates three bus routes on a pulse system with all routes serving the Santa Fe Depot Transit Center on the hour and the Walmart Midpoint Transfer at 31 past the hour.

Hours of operation for the system are Monday through Friday from 6:00 A.M. to 7:00 P.M. There is no service on Saturdays and Sundays. Regular fares are $1.00.

=== Routes ===
- Blue Route
- Red Route
- Green Route

== Fixed route ridership ==
The ridership statistics shown here are of fixed route services only and do not include demand response services.

== See also ==
- List of bus transit systems in the United States
- Dodge City station
