= James C. Holland =

American architect

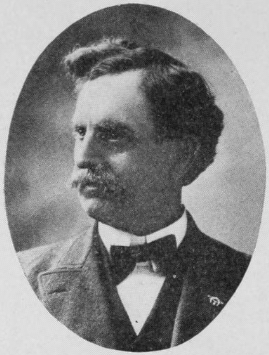
- Born: James Clinton Holland; April 2, 1853; Lima, Ohio
- Died: May 28, 1919 (aged 66); Topeka, Kansas
- Education: Ohio Northern University
- Occupation: Architect
- Spouse: Lizzie Baker (m. 1882)
- Children: 3

James Clinton Holland (1853–1919) was an architect in the U.S. state of Kansas.

The firm also operated as J. C. Holland and Son.

== Biography ==
James C. Holland was born April 2, 1853, in a log cabin in Lima, Ohio. He worked as an architect in Kansas for more than 30 years. He served as state architect for a period of time. In 1882, Holland married Lizzie Baker, with whom he had two sons and a daughter. In 1883-1884 he was chair of the architecture department of Ohio Northern University, his alma mater.

He died on May 28, 1919, in Topeka, Kansas.

Under various punctuations or spellings for his name, and/or with various partners, many of his works are listed on the National Register of Historic Places.

== Projects ==
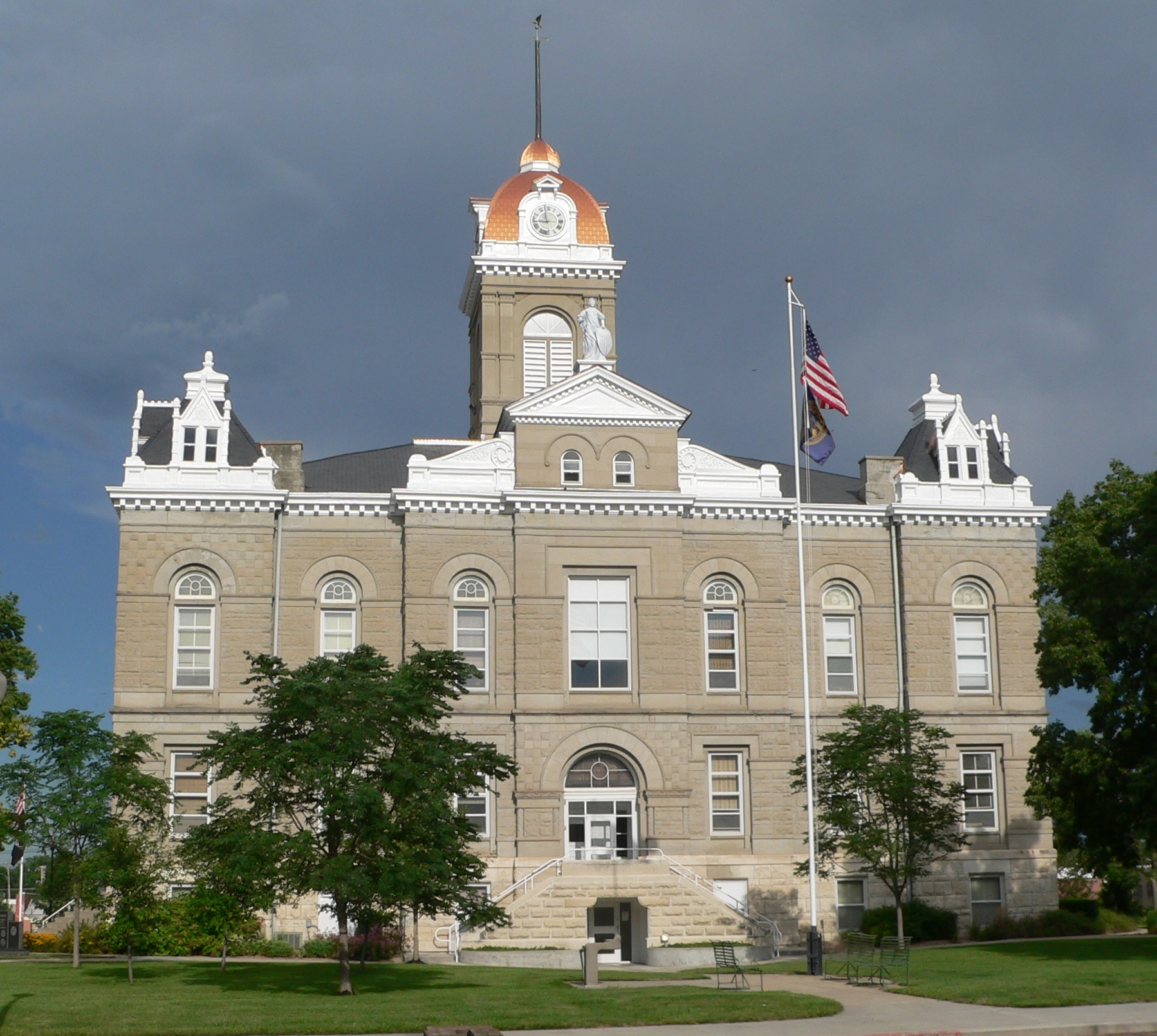
Jefferson County Courthouse

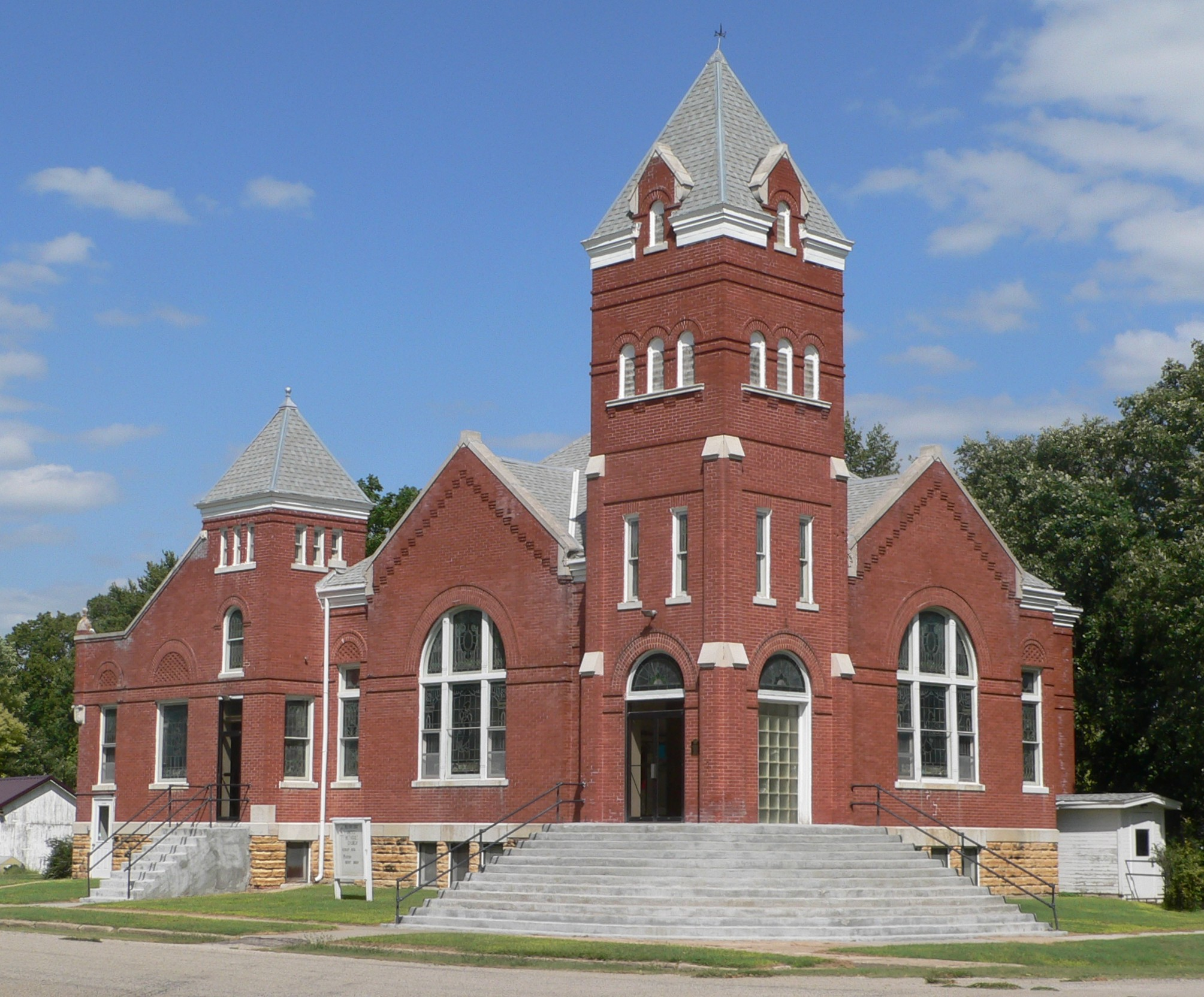
Burr Oak United Methodist Church

J. C. Holland's or the firm's works include (with attribution):

- Atchison, Topeka and Santa Fe Railway Depot, E. Wyatt Earp Blvd., Dodge City, KS (Holland, J. C.), NRHP-listed
- Burr Oak School, 776 Kansas, Burr Oak, KS (Holland, J. C.), NRHP-listed
- Burr Oak United Methodist Church, NE corner Pennsylvania & Washington Sts., Burr Oak, KS (Holland, J. C.), NRHP-listed
- Clay County Courthouse, 5th and Court Sts., Clay Center, KS (Holland, J. C.), NRHP-listed
- One or more works in Downtown Manhattan Historic District, generally including the blocks between Humboldt and Pierre Streets from 3rd to 5th Sts., Manhattan, KS (Holland, J. C.), NRHP-listed
- One or more works in Fairbury Commercial Historic District, roughly bounded by 6th, F, 3rd, and B Sts., and RR tracks, Fairbury, NE (Holland, J. C.), NRHP-listed
- Jefferson County Courthouse, Courthouse Sq., Fairbury, NE (Holland, J. C.), NRHP-listed
- Jewell County Jail, Jct. of Center and Madison, NE corner, Mankato, KS (Holland, James C.), NRHP-listed
- Marion County Courthouse, 3rd and Williams Sts., Marion, KS (Holland, J. C.), NRHP-listed
- Mitchell County Courthouse, Main St. and Hersey Ave., Beloit, KS (Holland, J. C.), NRHP-listed
- Ness County Bank, Main St. and Pennsylvania Ave., Ness City, KS (Holland & Hopkins), NRHP-listed
- Old Junction City High School, Adams and 6th Sts., Junction City, KS (Holland & Squires), NRHP-listed
- Osborne County Courthouse, 423 W. Main St., Osborne, KS (Holland, J. C. & Squires), NRHP-listed
- Rice County Courthouse, 101 W. Commercial St., Lyons, KS (J. C. Holland and Son), NRHP-listed
- Riley County Courthouse, 100 Courthouse Plaza, Manhattan, KS (Holland, J. C. & F. C. Squires), NRHP-listed
- Thomas County Courthouse, 300 N. Court, Colby, KS (Holland, J. C. & Squires, Frank), NRHP-listed
- Washington County Jail and Sheriff's Residence, 23 Commercial St., Washington, KS (Holland, James C.), NRHP-listed
