= Lincoln County Courthouse (Kansas) =

- U.S. National Register of Historic Places
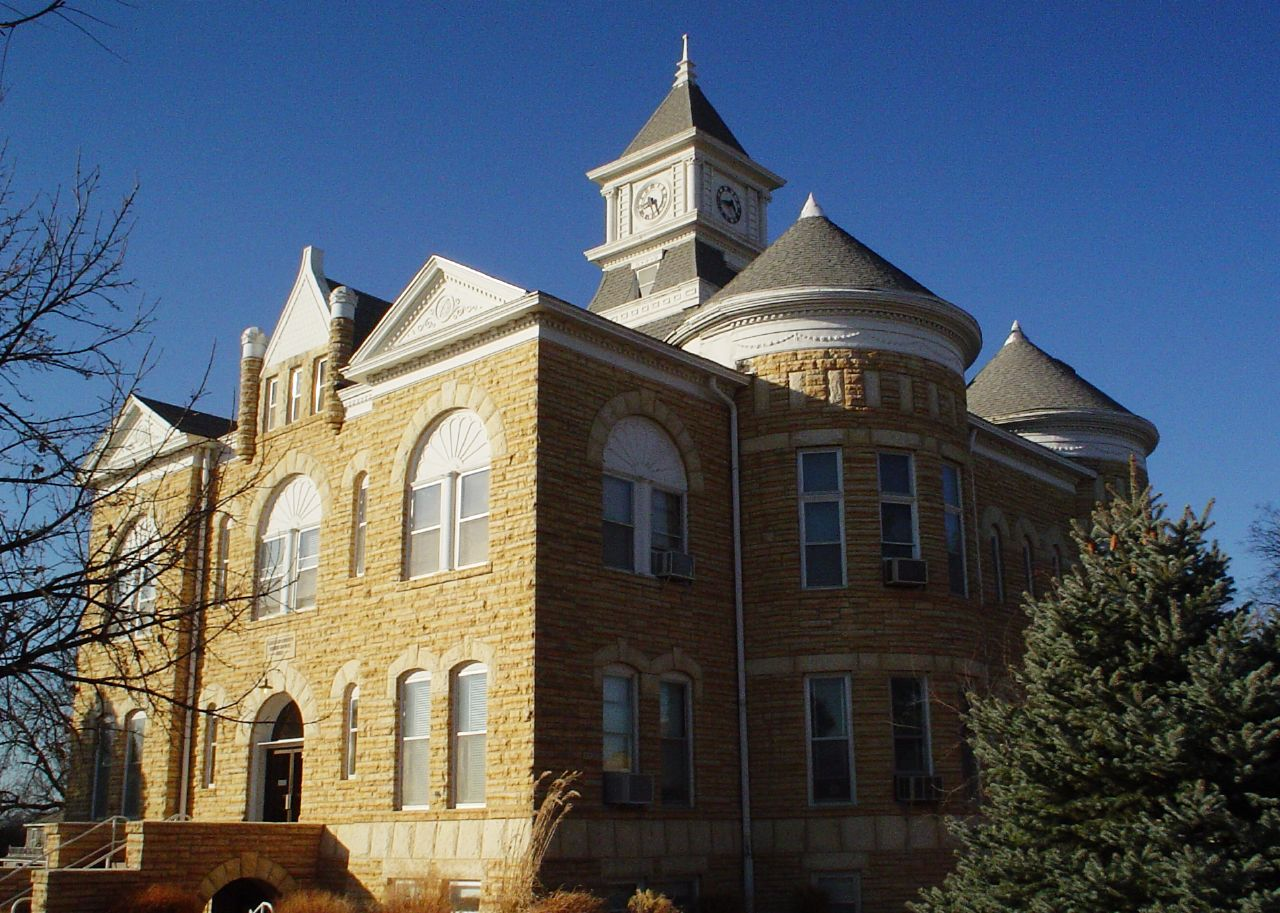
- The Lincoln County Courthouse in 2005

- Location within Kansas Location within the United States
- Location: 3rd and Lincoln Ave., Lincoln, Kansas
- Coordinates: 39°2′27″N 98°8′41″W
- Area: 1 acre (0.40 ha)
- Built: 1899
- Architects: Squires, C.W.
- Architectural style: Richardsonian Romanesque
- NRHP reference No.: 76000825
- Added to NRHP: July 13, 1976

The Lincoln County Courthouse in Lincoln in Lincoln County, Kansas, is located at 3rd and Lincoln Ave. It was built in 1899–1901. It was listed on the National Register of Historic Places in 1976.

It was built to replace an 1873 stone courthouse which was destroyed by a fire on the night of December 7, 1898.

It is a two-story Richardsonian Romanesque-style limestone building with a basement and has a central clock tower. It is 87 by 67 feet (27 m × 20 m) in plan.
