= Rice County Courthouse (Kansas) =

- U.S. National Register of Historic Places
- Location within Kansas Location within the United States
- Location: 101 W. Commercial St., Lyons, Kansas
- Coordinates: 38°20′50″N 98°12′13″W
- Area: Less than one acre
- Built by: Cuthbert and Son
- Architects: Holland, J.C., and Son
- Architectural style: Romanesque
- MPS: County Courthouses of Kansas MPS
- NRHP reference No.: 02000401
- Added to NRHP: April 26, 2002

The Rice County Courthouse of Lyons, Kansas, is located at 101 W. Commercial St. It was listed on the National Register of Historic Places in 2002.

Designed by architects J.C. Holland and Son, it is a four-story, Richardsonian Romanesque-style brick building which is 90 by 100 feet (27 m × 30 m) in plan. It has a hipped roof with dormers and a central clock tower.
