= Ralph Perkins (Kansas politician) =

Kansas state legislator

Ralph Perkins (December 12, 1893 – October 25, 1976) was a stockman, banker, and state legislator in Kansas.

A Republican who lived in Howard, Kansas, he represented Elk County in the Kansas House of Representatives in 1939 and 1941 and in the Kansas Senate from 1943–1952. In 1942 he succeeded N. B. Wall in the Kansas Senate.

He was a rancher. He served as president of Howard National Bank.

Lynn Perkins was his son.
