= Thomas County Courthouse (Kansas) =

- U.S. National Register of Historic Places
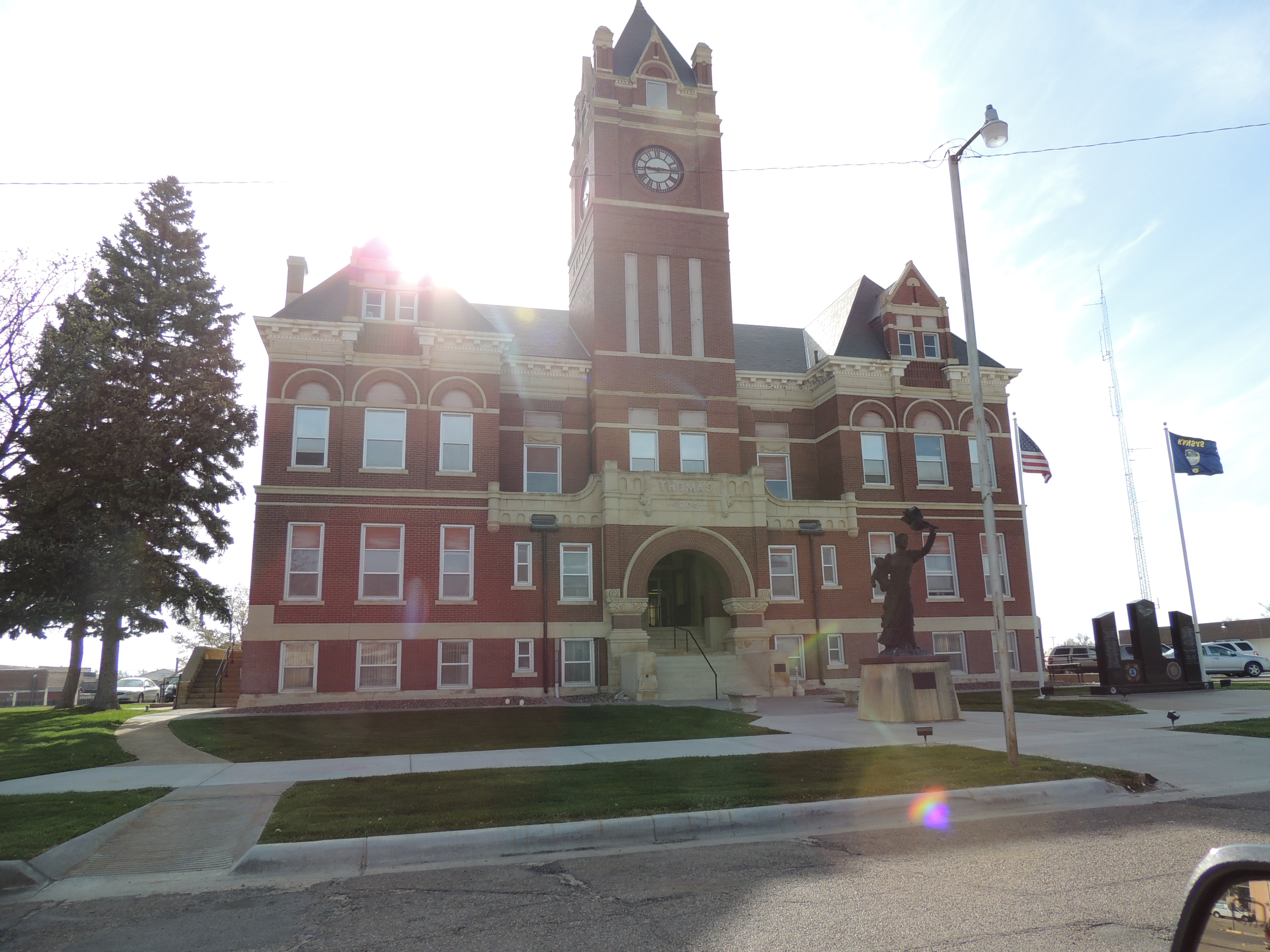

- Location within Kansas Location within the United States
- Interactive map showing the location of Thomas County Courthouse
- Location: 300 N. Court, Colby, Kansas
- Coordinates: 39°23′45″N 101°2′33″W
- Area: 2 acres (0.81 ha)
- Built: 1906–07
- Built by: Crosby, L. & Son
- Architect: Holland, J. C. & Squires, Frank
- Architectural style: Richardsonian Romanesque
- NRHP reference No.: 76000842
- Added to NRHP: November 21, 1976

The Thomas County Courthouse, located at 300 N. Court in Colby, is the seat of government of Thomas County, Kansas. The courthouse was built from 1906 to 1907 and replaced the county's original courthouse. Architect James C. Holland designed the courthouse in the Richardsonian Romanesque style. The front of the courthouse has a five-story clock tower with a Seth Thomas clock; the main entrance to the building is located in a Syrian arch at the bottom of the tower. A projecting wing is located on each side of the tower; the wings each have three windows on every story and a hipped roof with a dormer.

The courthouse was added to the National Register of Historic Places on November 21, 1976.

The statuary in front, Spirit of the Prairie, was added to celebrate the city's centenary (1985). It was sculpted by Charlie Norton of nearby Leoti, Kansas.
