= List of county courthouses in Kansas =

This is a list of Kansas county courthouses. Each of Kansas's 105 counties has a courthouse in a city that is the county seat where the county government resides.

Courthouse	Photo	County	Location	Built	Notes
Allen County Courthouse		Allen	Iola	1957–58	
Anderson County Courthouse		Anderson	Garnett	1901–02	NRHP-listed (refnum 72000483).
Atchison County Courthouse		Atchison	Atchison	1896–97	NRHP-listed (refnum 75000704).
Barber County Courthouse		Barber	Medicine Lodge	1955–56	
Barton County Courthouse		Barton	Great Bend	1917–18	
Bourbon County Courthouse		Bourbon	Fort Scott	1929–30	
Brown County Courthouse		Brown	Hiawatha	1925–26	
Butler County Courthouse		Butler	El Dorado	1908–09	NRHP-listed (refnum 2000390).
Chase County Courthouse		Chase	Cottonwood Falls	1871–73	KNRHP-listed (refnum 71000304). Oldest courthouse in Kansas still in operation.
Chautauqua County Courthouse		Chautauqua	Sedan	1917–18	
Cherokee County Courthouse		Cherokee	Columbus	1955–56	
Cheyenne County Courthouse		Cheyenne	St. Francis	1924–25	NRHP-listed (refnum 2000391).
Clark County Courthouse		Clark	Ashland	1950–51	
Clay County Courthouse		Clay	Clay Center	1900–01	NRHP-listed (refnum 73000746).
Cloud County Courthouse		Cloud	Concordia	1958–59	
Coffey County Courthouse		Coffey	Burlington	1963–64	
Comanche County Courthouse		Comanche	Coldwater	1927–28	NRHP-listed (refnum 2000395).
Cowley County Courthouse		Cowley	Winfield	1961–62	
Crawford County Courthouse		Crawford	Girard	1921–22	NRHP-listed (refnum 9000225).
Decatur County Courthouse		Decatur	Oberlin	1926–27	
Dickinson County Courthouse		Dickinson	Abilene	1955–56	
Doniphan County Courthouse		Doniphan	Troy	1905–06	NRHP-listed (refnum 74000826). Part of the Doniphan County Courthouse Square Historic District.
Douglas County Courthouse		Douglas	Lawrence	1903–04	NRHP-listed (refnum 75000708).
Edwards County Courthouse		Edwards	Kinsley	1928–29	
Elk County Courthouse		Elk	Howard	1907–08	NRHP-listed (refnum 9000227).
Ellis County Courthouse		Ellis	Hays	1940–42	
Ellsworth County Courthouse		Ellsworth	Ellsworth	1953–54	
Finney County Courthouse		Finney	Garden City	1928–29	
Ford County Courthouse		Ford	Dodge City	1912–13	
Franklin County Courthouse		Franklin	Ottawa	1892–93	NRHP-listed (refnum 72000502).
Geary County Courthouse		Geary	Junction City	1899–1900	
Gove County Courthouse		Gove	Gove City	1885–86 (renovated 1960 & 1974)	
Graham County Courthouse		Graham	Hill City	1957–58	
Grant County Courthouse		Grant	Ulysses	1930–31	NRHP-listed (refnum 2000396).
Gray County Courthouse		Gray	Cimarron	1927	
Greeley County Courthouse		Greeley	Tribune	1973–75	
Greenwood County Courthouse		Greenwood	Eureka	1955–56	
Hamilton County Courthouse		Hamilton	Syracuse	1938	
Harper County Courthouse		Harper	Anthony	1907–08	NRHP-listed (refnum 78001282).
Harvey County Courthouse		Harvey	Newton	1965–66	
Haskell County Courthouse		Haskell	Sublette	1977–78	
Hodgeman County Courthouse		Hodgeman	Jetmore	1929–30	NRHP-listed (refnum 2000429).
Jackson County Courthouse		Jackson	Holton	1920–21	
Jefferson County Courthouse		Jefferson	Oskaloosa	1961-62 (remodeled 1988)	
Jewell County Courthouse		Jewell	Mankato	1936–37	NRHP-listed (refnum 2000397).
Johnson County Courthouse		Johnson	Olathe	1951–52	
Kearny County Courthouse		Kearny	Lakin	1939	
Kingman County Courthouse		Kingman	Kingman	1907–08	NRHP-listed (refnum 85002128).
Kiowa County Courthouse		Kiowa	Greensburg	1913–14 (remodeled 2009)	
Labette County Courthouse		Labette	Oswego	1948–49	
Lane County Courthouse		Lane	Dighton	1930–31	
Leavenworth County Courthouse		Leavenworth	Leavenworth	1911–13	NRHP-listed (refnum 2000394).
Lincoln County Courthouse		Lincoln	Lincoln Center	1899–1901	NRHP-listed (refnum 76000825).
Linn County Courthouse		Linn	Mound City	1885–86	NRHP-listed (refnum 74000842).
Logan County Courthouse		Logan	Oakley	1887–88	
Lyon County Courthouse		Lyon	Emporia	2000–01	
Marion County Courthouse		Marion	Marion	1905–07	NRHP-listed (refnum 76000828).
Marshall County Courthouse		Marshall	Marysville	1891–92	NRHP-listed (refnum 74000843).
McPherson County Courthouse		McPherson	McPherson	1893–94	NRHP-listed (refnum 76002264).
Meade County Courthouse		Meade	Meade	1928	
Miami County Courthouse		Miami	Paola	1897–99	NRHP-listed (refnum 73000768).
Mitchell County Courthouse		Mitchell	Beloit	1901–02	NRHP-listed (refnum 77000591).
Montgomery County Courthouse		Montgomery	Independence	1886–87	
Morris County Courthouse		Morris	Council Grove	1968–69	
Morton County Courthouse		Morton	Elkhart	1963–64	
Nemeha County Courthouse		Nemeha	Seneca	1954–55	
Neosho County Courthouse		Neosho	Erie	1961–62	
Ness County Courthouse		Ness City	1917–18		
Norton County Courthouse		Norton	Norton	1929–30	
Osage County Courthouse		Osage	Lyndon	1922–23	
Osborne County Courthouse		Osborne	Osborne	1907–08	
Ottawa County Courthouse		Ottawa	Minneapolis	1956–57	
Pawnee County Courthouse		Pawnee	Larned	1917–19	
Phillips County Courthouse		Phillips	Phillipsburg	1912–13	
Pottawatomie County Courthouse		Phillips	Westmoreland	1884	
Pratt County Courthouse		Pratt	Pratt	1909–10	
Rawlins County Courthouse		Rawlins	Atwood	1906–07	
Reno County Courthouse		Reno	Hutchinson	1929–30	NRHP-listed (refnum 86003530).
Republic County Courthouse		Republic	Belleville	1938–39	NRHP-listed (refnum 2000393).
Rice County Courthouse		Rice	Lyons	1911–12	NRHP-listed (refnum 2000401).
Riley County Courthouse		Riley	Manhattan	1906–07	NRHP-listed (refnum 5001249).
Rooks County Courthouse		Rooks	Stockton	1921–24	NRHP-listed (refnum 2000400).
Rush County Courthouse		Rush	La Crosse	1888–89	NRHP-listed (refnum 72000524).
Russell County Courthouse		Russell	Russell	1902–04	
Saline County Courthouse		Saline	Salina	1968–69	
Scott County Courthouse		Scott	Scott City	1924–25	
Sedgwick County Courthouse		Sedgwick	Wichita	1956–58	
Seward County Courthouse		Seward	Liberal	1956–57	
Shawnee County Courthouse		Shawnee	Topeka	1963–64	
Sheridan County Courthouse		Sheridan	Hoxie	1917–18	
Sherman County Courthouse		Sherman	Goodland	1931–32	
Smith County Courthouse		Smith	Smith Center	1918–20	
Stafford County Courthouse		Stafford	St. John	1928–29	
Stanton County Courthouse		Stanton	Johnson City	1926–27	
Stevens County Courthouse		Stevens	Hugoton	1950–52	
Sumner County Courthouse		Sumner	Wellington	1951–52	
Thomas County Courthouse		Thomas	Colby	1906–07	NRHP-listed (refnum 76000842).
Trego County Courthouse		Trego	WaKeeney	1888–89	
Wabaunsee County Courthouse		Wabaunsee	Alma	1931–32	NRHP-listed (refnum 2000399).
Wallace County Courthouse		Wallace	Sharon Springs	1914–15	
Washington County Courthouse		Washington	Washington	1932–34	NRHP-listed (refnum 328).
Wichita County Courthouse		Wichita	Leoti	1916–17	
Wilson County Courthouse		Wilson	Fredonia	1960–61	
Woodson County Courthouse		Woodson	Yates Center	1899–1900	NRHP-listed (refnum 85002951).
Wyandotte County Courthouse		Wyandotte	Kansas City	1926–27	NRHP-listed (refnum 2000398).

== See also ==
- List of United States federal courthouses in Kansas
