= Sharon Springs Township, Kansas =

Township in Wallace County, Kansas, U.S.

Sharon Springs Township
- Township
- Location within Wallace County
- Coordinates: 38.942305°N 101.753965°W
- Country: United States
- State: Kansas
- County: Wallace

Area
  - Total: 341.522 sq mi (884.54 km^{2})
  - Land: 341.51 sq mi (884.5 km^{2})
  - Water: 0.012 sq mi (0.031 km^{2}) 0.003%

Population (2020)
  - Total: 925
  - Density: 2.71/sq mi (1.05/km^{2})
- Time zone: UTC-7 (MST)
  - Summer (DST): UTC-6 (MDT)
- Area code: 785
- GNIS feature ID: 485207

Sharon Springs Township is a township in Wallace County, Kansas, United States. As of the 2020 census, its population was 925.

== History ==
A former township of Wallace County, Vega Township, was dissolved in the 1890s and split between Sharon Springs Township and North Township, with the remainder becoming Stockholm Township. North Township would be annexed into Sharon Springs Township in 1981. Another township, Morton Township, would also be dissolved in 1981 and split between Sharon Springs Township and Weskan Township.

== Geography ==
Sharon Springs Township covers an area of 341.522 square miles (884.54 km^{2}), 0.003% of it water. The Smoky Hill River flows through it, as well as Rose Creek.

=== Communities ===
- Sharon Springs

=== Adjacent townships ===
Smoky Township, Sherman County
| McPherson Township, Sherman County | northwest | north |
| Weskan Township, Wallace County | west | self | east | Wallace Township, Wallace County |
| | | south | southeast | Harrison Township, Wallace County |
Tribune Township, Greeley County

== Transportation ==
=== Major highways ===
- US-40
- K-27

== Demographics ==
As of the 2020 census, the township had a population of 925, giving a population density of 2.71 people per square mile (1.05 people/km^{2}). The racial makeup of the township was 89.3% White, 0.4% Native American, 0.2% Black or African American, 0.1% Pacific Islander, 3.8% from some other race, and 6.2% from two or more races. Hispanics or Latinos of any race were 6.3% of the population.

The 2020–2024 American Community Survey estimated that the township contained 397 households and 465 housing units.
