= Barton County Courthouse (Kansas) =

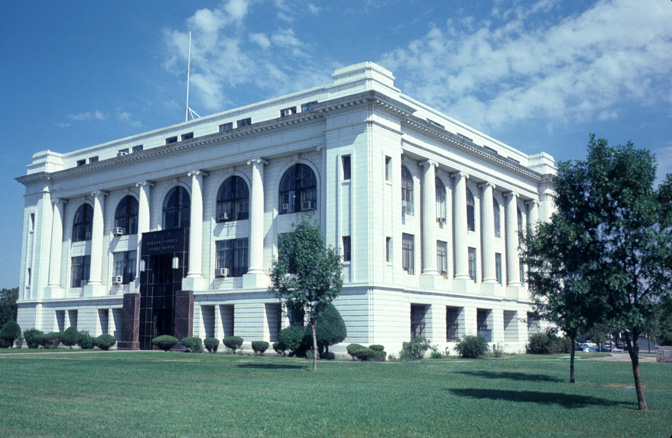

- Location within Kansas Location within the United States

General information
- Architectural style: Modern Classical Eclecticism
- Location: 1400 Main Street, Great Bend, Kansas
- Coordinates: 38°22′10″N 98°45′54″W
- Construction started: 1917
- Completed: 1918

Design and construction
- Architects: William Earl Hulse & Company
- Main contractor: Manhattan Construction Company

The Barton County Courthouse, located at 1400 Main Street in Great Bend, is the seat of government of Barton County, Kansas. Great Bend has been the county seat since 1867. The courthouse was built from 1917 to 1918 by contractors Manhattan Construction Company of Muskogee, Oklahoma.

Architect William Earl Hulse & Company of Hutchinson, Kansas designed the courthouse in the Modern Classical Eclecticism style. The courthouse is a four stories and faces west. It is constructed of white-colored brick and concrete. Ionic columns rise from the second story to the third story. Large arched windows are on the third story and small windows on the fourth story. The entrance is framed with black colored stone.

The first courthouse was designed by John G. Haskell and built in 1873 by John McDonald. The current courthouse is the second structure used as a courthouse.

William Earl Hulse & Company also designed courthouses in Brown County, Kiowa County, Osage County, Pawnee County, Reno County, Wallace County, and Wichita County.

== See also ==
- List of county courthouses in Kansas
