= Wallace Township, Kansas =

Township in Wallace County, Kansas, U.S.

Wallace Township
- Township
- Location within Wallace County
- Coordinates: 38.985471°N 101.577665°W
- Country: United States
- State: Kansas
- County: Wallace

Area
  - Total: 188.509 sq mi (488.24 km^{2})
  - Land: 188.486 sq mi (488.18 km^{2})
  - Water: 0.023 sq mi (0.060 km^{2}) 0.01%

Population (2020)
  - Total: 167
  - Density: 0.886/sq mi (0.342/km^{2})
- Time zone: UTC-7 (MST)
  - Summer (DST): UTC-6 (MDT)
- Area code: 785
- GNIS feature ID: 485214

Wallace Township is a township in Wallace County, Kansas, United States. As of the 2020 census, its population was 167.

== History ==
Wallace Township was home to a now-extinct town called Sexton. Sexton's post office was open from 1906 to 1915.

== Geography ==
Wallace Township covers an area of 188.509 square miles (488.24 km^{2}), 0.01% of it water. The Smoky Hill River flows through it, as well as Rose Creek.

=== Communities ===
- Wallace

=== Adjacent townships ===
Iowa Township, Sherman County
Smoky Township, Sherman County	northwest	north	northeast	McAllaster Township, Logan County
Sharon Springs Township, Wallace County	west	self
		south	southeast	Western Township, Logan County
Harrison Township, Wallace County

== Transportation ==
=== Major highways ===
- US-40

== Demographics ==
As of the 2020 census, the township had a population of 167, giving a population density of 0.886 people per square mile (0.342 people/km^{2}). The racial makeup of the township was 95.8% White, and 4.2% from two or more races. Hispanics or Latinos of any race were 1.2% of the population.

The 2020–2024 American Community Survey estimated that the township contained 41 households and 60 housing units.
