= Osage County Courthouse =

Osage County Courthouse may refer to:

- Osage County Courthouse (Kansas), Lyndon, Kansas
- Osage County Courthouse (Missouri), in Linn, Osage County, Missouri
- Osage County Courthouse (Oklahoma), Pawhuska, Oklahoma, listed on the National Register of Historic Places
