= Morris County Courthouse (Kansas) =

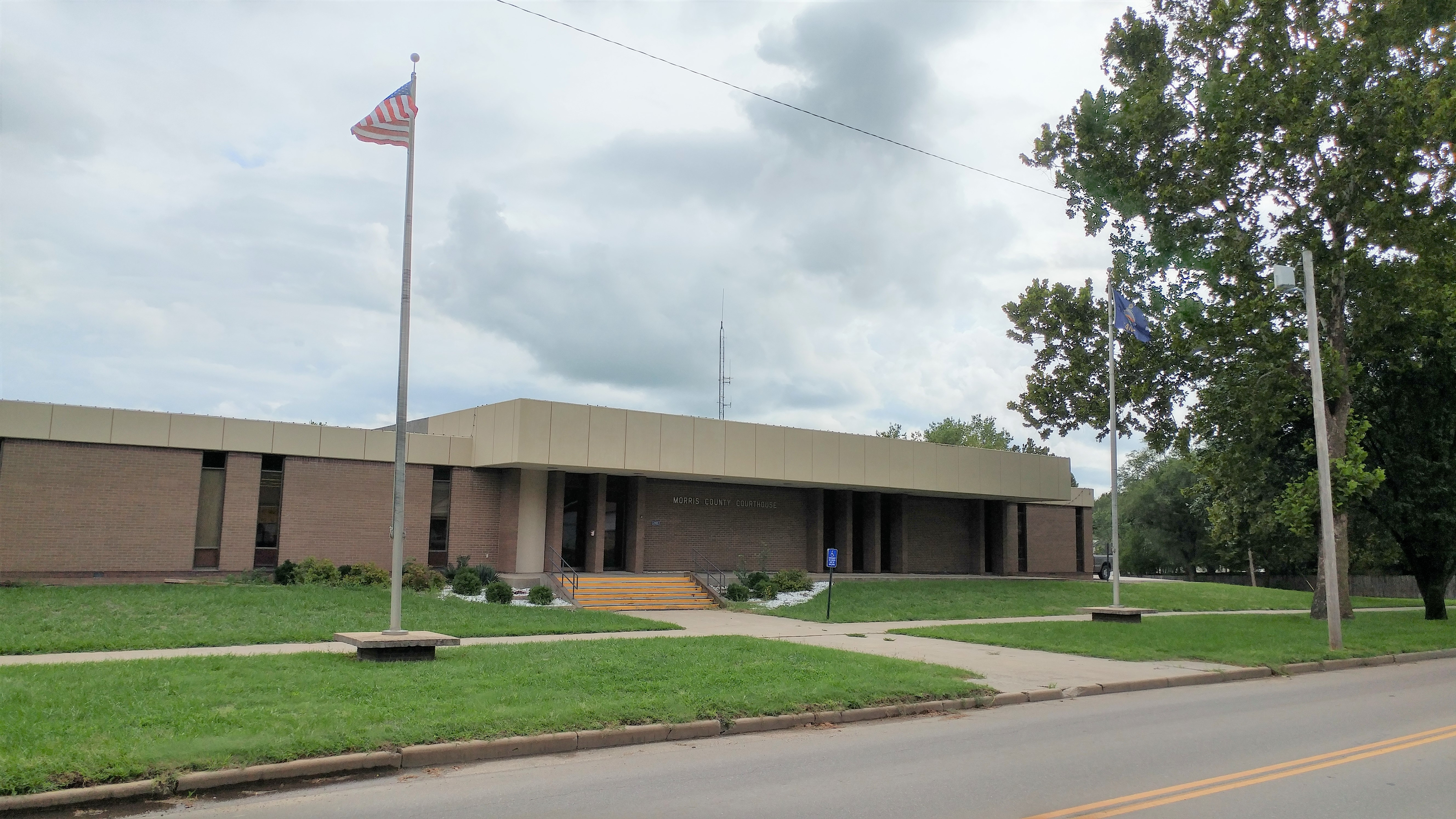

- Location within Kansas Location within the United States

General information
- Architectural style: Modern
- Location: 501 West Main Street, Council Grove, Kansas
- Coordinates: 38°39′33″N 96°29′42″W
- Construction started: 1968
- Completed: 1969

Design and construction
- Architects: Kiene & Bradley Architects
- Main contractor: Bradley Building Company of Kansas Inc.

The Morris County Courthouse, located at 501 West Main Street in Council Grove, is the seat of government of Morris County, Kansas. Council Grove has been the county seat since 1859. The courthouse was built from 1968 to 1969 by contractor Bradley Building Company of Kansas Inc..

Kiene & Bradley Architects of Topeka, Kansas designed the courthouse in the Modern style. The courthouse is located on spacious landscaped grounds at the city's center. It is two stories and faces west, with the entrance having a large concrete overhang. The east side of the building, a hill fall away exposing the two stories. It is constructed of brown-colored brick and concrete with a flat roof.

The first courthouse was a log cabin built by Seth Millington Hays in 1847, which was originally used as his residence and trading post on the Santa Fe Trail. The second courthouse was built in 1873 of native stone and had an addition constructed in 1902 by W. C. Squires. The second courthouse was razed to build the present courthouse.

Kiene & Bradley Architects also designed courthouses in Coffey County, Greeley County, Jefferson County, Logan County, Neosho County, and Wilson County.

== See also ==
- List of county courthouses in Kansas
