= Allen County Courthouse =

Allen County Courthouse may refer to:

- Allen County Courthouse (Indiana), Fort Wayne, Indiana
- Allen County Courthouse (Kansas), Iola, Kansas
- Allen County Courthouse (Ohio), Lima, Ohio

== See also ==
- Allen Parish Courthouse, Oberlin, Louisiana
