= Rush County Courthouse =

Rush County Courthouse may refer to:

- Rush County Courthouse (Indiana), Rushville, Indiana
- Rush County Courthouse (Kansas), La Crosse, Kansas
