= Dickinson County Courthouse =

Dickinson County Courthouse may refer to:

- Dickinson County Courthouse (Iowa), Spirit Lake, Iowa
- Dickinson County Courthouse (Kansas), Abilene, Kansas
- Dickinson County Courthouse and Jail, Iron Mountain, Michigan
