= Brown County Courthouse (Kansas) =

Historic courthouse in Hiawatha, Kansas, U.S.

- U.S. Historic district – Contributing property
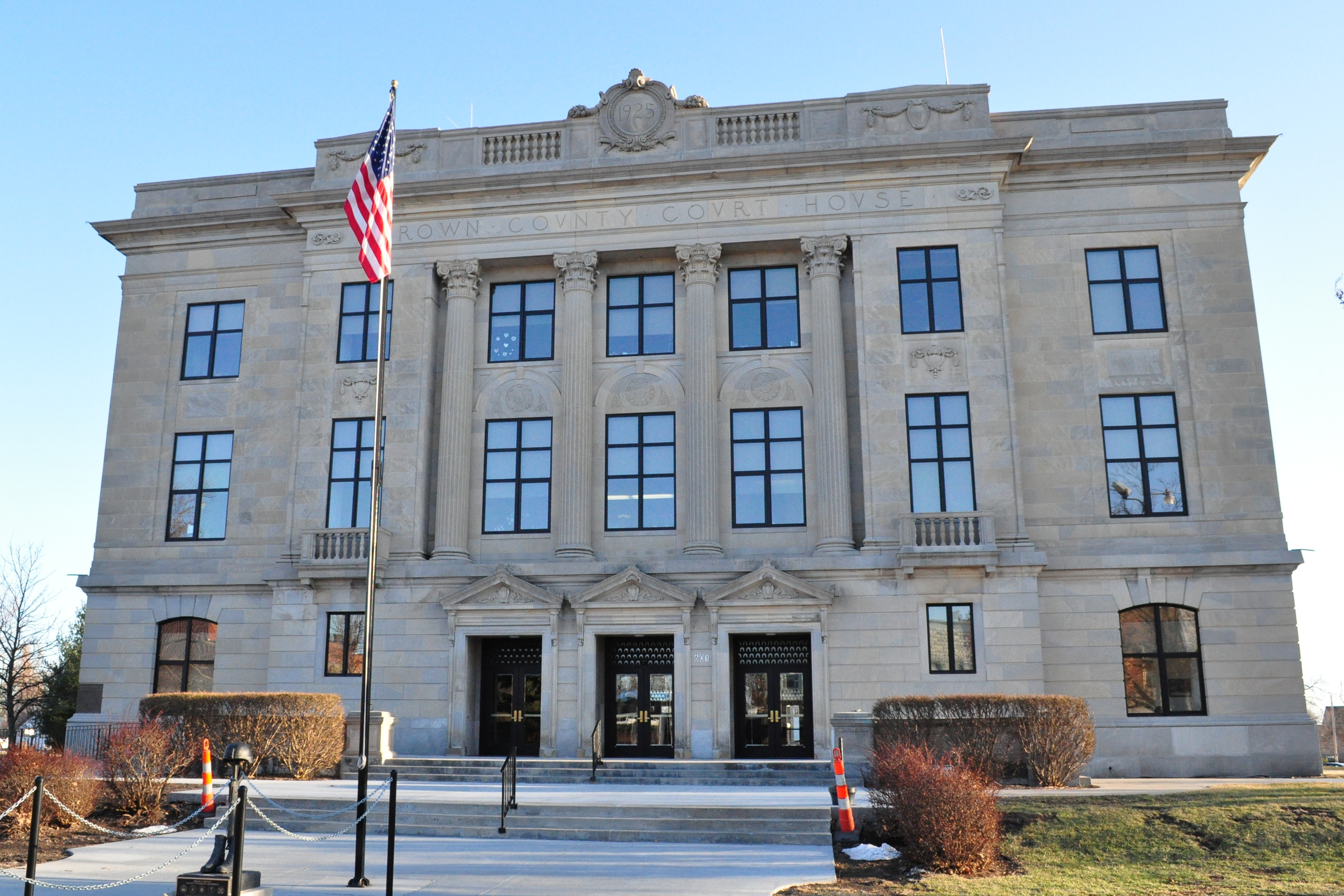

- Location within Kansas Location within the United States
- Interactive map showing the location of Brown County Courthouse
- Location: 601 Oregon Street, Hiawatha, Kansas
- Coordinates: 39°51′8″N 95°32′11″W
- Built: 1925-1926
- Built by: Harvey E. Wood
- Architect: William Earl Hulse & Company
- Architectural style: Neoclassical
- Part of: Hiawatha Courthouse Square Historic District (ID05001052)
- Designated CP: August 21, 2006

The Brown County Courthouse, located at 601 Oregon Street in Hiawatha, is the seat of government of Brown County, Kansas. Hiawatha has been the county seat since 1858. The courthouse was built from 1925 to 1926 by contractor Harvey E. Wood.

Architect William Earl Hulse & Company of Hutchinson, Kansas designed the courthouse in the Neoclassical style. The courthouse is three stories and faces north. It is constructed of limestone and concrete. It is located on spacious landscaped grounds in the center of the city. The north and south sides are nearly identical and both have entrances, with the north side having three. Four Corinthian columns rise from the second story to the third story. The courthouse is part of the Hiawatha Courthouse Square Historic District.

The current courthouse is the third structure used as a courthouse. The first courthouse was a frame, two-story structure built in 1858 at a cost of $2,000; it was demolished in 1880. The second courthouse was a two-story brick structure built in 1879 for $20,000 by James A. McGonigle and designed by Erasmus T. Carr.

William Earl Hulse & Company also designed the Barton County Courthouse, the Kiowa County Courthouse, the Osage County Courthouse, the Pawnee County Courthouse, the Reno County Courthouse, the Wallace County Courthouse, and the Wichita County Courthouse.

== See also ==
- List of county courthouses in Kansas
