= Cherokee County Courthouse =

Cherokee County Courthouse may refer to:

- Cherokee County Courthouse (Georgia), Canton, Georgia
- Cherokee County Courthouse (Iowa), Cherokee, Iowa
- Cherokee County Courthouse (Kansas), Baxter Springs, Kansas
- Cherokee County Courthouse (North Carolina), Murphy, North Carolina
