= Marshall County Courthouse =

Marshall County Courthouse or Marshall County Court House may refer to:

- Marshall County Courthouse (Indiana), Plymouth, Indiana
- Marshall County Courthouse (Iowa), Marshalltown, Iowa
- Marshall County Courthouse (Kansas), Marysville, Kansas
- Marshall County Courthouse (Mississippi), Holly Springs, Mississippi, a Mississippi Landmark
- Marshall County Courthouse (Oklahoma), Madill, Oklahoma
- Marshall County Courthouse (South Dakota), Britton, South Dakota
- Marshall County Courthouse, part of the Moundsville Commercial Historic District, Moundsville, West Virginia
