= Sharon Springs =

Sharon Springs may refer to a place in the United States:

- Sharon Springs, Kansas
- Sharon Springs, New York
- Sharon Springs, Georgia
