= Jefferson County Courthouse (Kansas) =

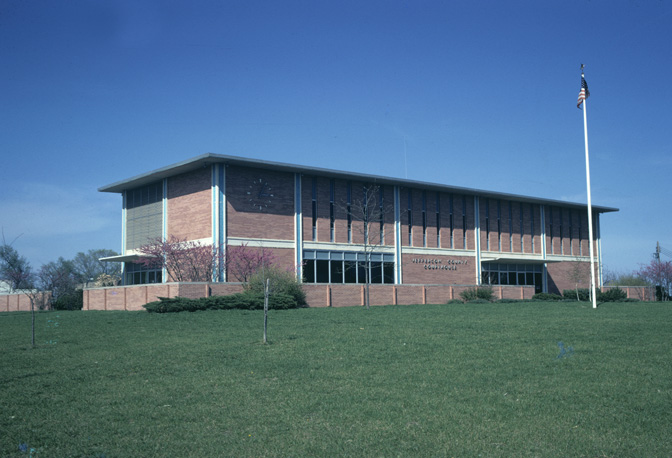

- Location within Kansas Location within the United States

General information
- Architectural style: Modern
- Location: 300 Jefferson Street, Oskaloosa, Kansas
- Coordinates: 39°12′57″N 95°18′49″W
- Construction started: 1961
- Completed: 1962

Design and construction
- Architects: Kiene & Bradley Architects
- Main contractor: J. A. Lundgren & Sons

The Jefferson County Courthouse, located at 300 Jefferson Street in Oskaloosa, is the seat of government of Jefferson County, Kansas. Oskaloosa has been the county seat since 1855. The courthouse was built from 1963 to 1964 by contractor J. A. Lundgren & Sons.

Kiene & Bradley Architects of Topeka, Kansas designed the courthouse in the Modern style. The courthouse is located on spacious landscaped grounds in the city's center. It is two stories and faces south. It is constructed of red-colored brick and concrete with a flat roof. The second story northwest corner of the building has a large, faceless clock. The building was remodeled in 1988 by Tefft & Donaldson Contractors; the architect was Ossmann & Associates of Topeka.

The first courthouse was built in 1868 by Graham & Swain and designed by E. D. Baldwin. It was extensively damaged by a F4 tornado on May 19, 1960, requiring the building to be razed and replaced.

Kiene & Bradley Architects also designed courthouses in Coffey County, Greeley County, Logan County, Morris County, Neosho County, and Wilson County.

== See also ==
- List of county courthouses in Kansas
