= Greeley County Courthouse (Kansas) =

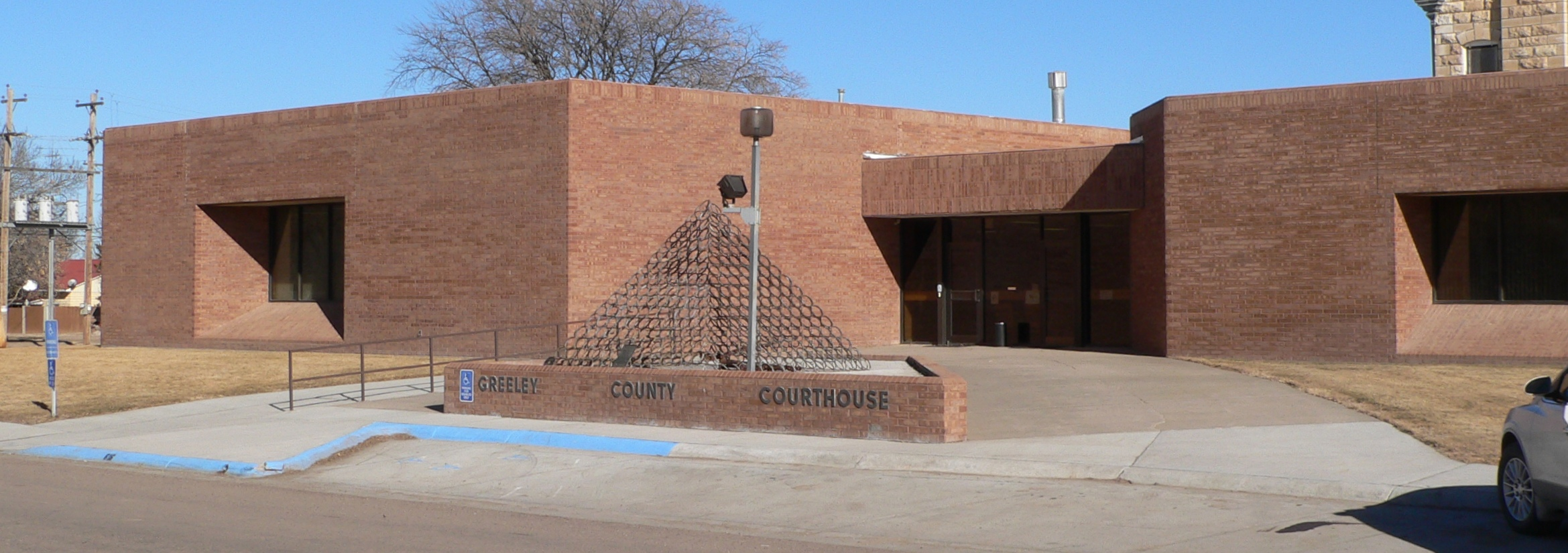

- Location within Kansas Location within the United States

General information
- Architectural style: Modern
- Location: 616 2nd Street, Tribune, Kansas
- Coordinates: 38°28′16″N 101°45′1″W
- Construction started: 1973
- Completed: 1975

Design and construction
- Architects: Kiene & Bradley Partnership
- Main contractor: Ewing Construction, Inc.

The Greeley County Courthouse, located at 616 2nd Street in Tribune, is the seat of government of Greeley County, Kansas. Tribune has been the county seat since 1888. The courthouse was built from 1973 to 1975 by contractor Ewing Construction, Inc..

Kiene & Bradley Partnership of Topeka, Kansas designed the courthouse in the Modern style. The courthouse is located on landscaped grounds at the city's center. It is one story and faces west and constructed of dark red-colored brick and concrete with a flat roof.

The first courthouse, known as the Old Greeley County Courthouse, is two stories and constructed of sandstone by Allen and Oleson and William Ruff, both of Ness City, Kansas. It was built 1889-90 and designed by William T. Heaps. The first courthouse is located on the east side of the present courthouse grounds and houses the Greeley County Historical Society Museum.

Kiene & Bradley Architects also designed courthouses in Coffey County, Jefferson County, Logan County, Morris County, Neosho County, and Wilson County.

== See also ==
- List of county courthouses in Kansas
