= Logan County Courthouse (Kansas) =

- Location within Kansas Location within the United States

General information
- Architectural style: Modern
- Location: 710 West 2nd Street, Oakley, Kansas
- Coordinates: 39°7′37″N 100°51′41″W
- Construction started: 1964
- Completed: 1965

Design and construction
- Architects: Kiene & Bradley Architects
- Main contractor: Busboom & Rauh

The Logan County Courthouse, located at 710 West 2nd Street in Oakley, is the seat of government of Logan County, Kansas. Oakley has been the county seat since 1963. The courthouse was built from 1964 to 1965 by contractor Busboom & Rauh of Salina, Kansas.

Kiene & Bradley Architects of Topeka, Kansas designed the courthouse in the Modern style. The courthouse is located on landscaped grounds on the city's west side. It is one story and faces south, with a two-story wing on the north side. It is constructed of red-colored brick and concrete with a flat roof.

The first courthouse—now known as the Old Logan County Courthouse—was built in Russell Springs from 1887 to 1888 by George D. Kerns and designed by Alfred Meyer in the American Romanesque Revival style. Russell Springs remained the county seat until 1963. The building now houses the Butterfield Trail Museum.

Kiene & Bradley Architects also designed courthouses in Coffey County, Greeley County, Jefferson County, Morris County, Neosho County, and Wilson County.

== See also ==
- List of county courthouses in Kansas
