= Neosho County Courthouse (Kansas) =

- Location within Kansas Location within the United States

General information
- Architectural style: Modern
- Location: 100 South Main Street, Erie, Kansas
- Coordinates: 37°34′4″N 95°14′33″W
- Construction started: 1961
- Completed: 1962

Design and construction
- Architects: Kiene & Bradley Architects
- Main contractor: Deill Constructing Company

The Neosho County Courthouse, located at 100 South Main Street in Erie, is the seat of government of Neosho County, Kansas. Erie has been the county seat since 1874. The courthouse was built from 1961 to 1962 by contractor Deill Constructing Company.

Kiene & Bradley Architects of Topeka, Kansas designed the courthouse in the Modern style. It is one story and faces west. It is constructed of cream-colored brick and glass with a peaked roof that extends from the entrance partially to the east; the remainder of the structure has a flat roof. The entrance is supported by six square columns and is partially enclosed in glass. A second entrance is on the north side of the building.

Erie was the first county seat from 1864 to 1868. The county seat was moved to Osage Mission in 1868, returned to Erie in 1874, and the first courthouse was constructed. The second courthouse was built in 1904 of brick and native stone with a central cupola surmounted by towers with four round windows each. It was constructed Dannelly & Halfin and designed by George P. Washburn & Son. The building was razed after the present structure was completed.

Kiene & Bradley Architects also designed courthouses in Coffey County, Greeley County, Jefferson County, Logan County, Morris County, and Wilson County.

== See also ==
- List of county courthouses in Kansas
