= Coffey County Courthouse (Kansas) =

- Location within Kansas Location within the United States

General information
- Architectural style: Modern
- Location: 110 South 6th Street, Burlington, Kansas
- Coordinates: 38°11′39″N 95°44′31″W
- Construction started: 1963
- Completed: 1964

Design and construction
- Architects: Kiene & Bradley Architects
- Main contractor: Cornelius & Associates

The Coffey County Courthouse, located at 110 South 6th Street in Burlington, is the seat of government of Coffey County, Kansas. Burlington has been the county seat since 1866. The courthouse was built from 1963 to 1964 by contractor Cornelius & Associates.

Kiene & Bradley Architects of Topeka, Kansas designed the courthouse in the Modern style. The courthouse is located on landscaped grounds in the city's center. It is one story and faces east. It is constructed of red-colored brick and concrete with a flat roof. The east entrance is a portico supported by five square columns. To the left of the entrance is a highly stylized sculpture of Lady Justice affixed to the wall.

The county seat was moved from LeRoy to Burlington in 1866 and the first courthouse was erected. The second courthouse was built in 1901 by Betts & Company and designed by J. C. Holland.

Kiene & Bradley Architects also designed courthouses in Greeley County, Jefferson County, Logan County, Morris County, Neosho County, and Wilson County.

== See also ==
- List of county courthouses in Kansas
