= Cloud County Courthouse (Kansas) =

County courthouse in Kansas, United States

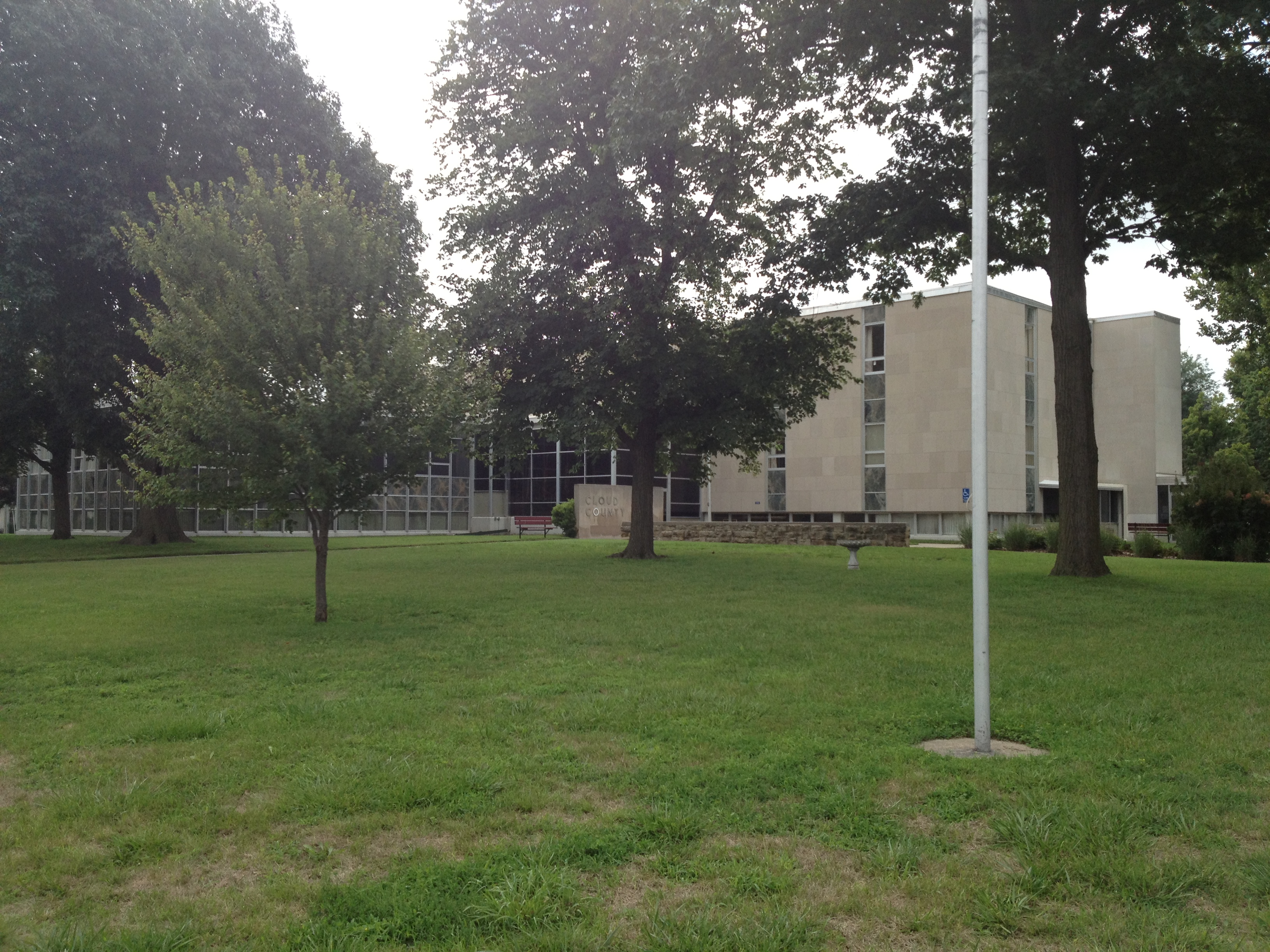

- Location within Kansas Location within the United States

General information
- Architectural style: Modern
- Location: 811 Washington Street, Concordia, Kansas
- Coordinates: 39°34′8″N 97°39′36″W
- Construction started: 1958
- Completed: 1959

Design and construction
- Architects: Williamson-Loebsack & Associates
- Main contractor: Rhode Construction Company

The Cloud County Courthouse, located at 811 Washington Street in Condordia, is the seat of the government of Cloud County, Kansas. Concordia has been the county seat since 1870. The courthouse was built from 1958 to 1959 by contractor Rhode Construction Company.

Architect Williamson-Loebsack & Associates of Topeka, Kansas designed the courthouse in the Modern style. The courthouse is located on spacious landscaped grounds in the city's center. It is three stories and faces west. It is constructed of gray limestone, glass, and concrete with a flat roof. The north section is two stories, constructed of glass, and has an entrance on the west side which serves as a foyer. On the east side of the courthouse is the old county jail.

The county was created on February 27, 1860, as Shirley County; the county seat was set at Clyde. It was moved to Rochester (now defunct) in 1866. The county was renamed Cloud County in 1867 with the county seat set at Concordia in 1870. The first courthouse was a three-story brick structure with an imposing central cupola, which was later removed. It was constructed by John S. Huntley and designed by W. R. Parson & Sons.

Williamson-Loebsack & Associates also designed courthouses in Greenwood County, Ottawa County, and Sumner County.

== See also ==
- List of county courthouses in Kansas
