= Cowley County Courthouse (Kansas) =

- Location within Kansas Location within the United States

General information
- Architectural style: Modern
- Location: 311 East 9th Avenue, Winfield, Kansas
- Coordinates: 37°14′23″N 96°59′38″W
- Construction started: 1961
- Completed: 1962

Design and construction
- Architects: Caton, Yadon & Potter; Stitzel & Thoma
- Main contractor: Law-Pollitt Construction Company

The Cowley County Courthouse, located at 311 East 9th Avenue in Winfield, is the seat of government of Cowley County, Kansas. Winfield has been the county seat since 1867. The courthouse was built from 1961 to 1962 by contractor Law-Pollitt Construction Company of Wichita, Kansas.

Caton, Yadon & Potter of Winfield and Stitzel & Thoma of Arkansas City, Kansas designed the courthouse in the Modern style. The courthouse is located on landscaped grounds on the city's west side. It is two stories and faces north. It is constructed of buff-colored brick and concrete with a flat roof. Adjoining the right side of the entrance is a large, two-story projection with a concrete map of the county showing the townships, cities, and rivers.

The first courthouse was constructed in 1873 by Steart & Simpson. It received an addition in 1885 constructed by Abe Smith and designed by Terry & Dumont. The second courthouse was built in 1901 by Manhattan Construction Company and designed by Patrick Henry Weathers of Jackson, Mississippi.

== See also ==
- List of county courthouses in Kansas
