= Bourbon County Courthouse (Kansas) =

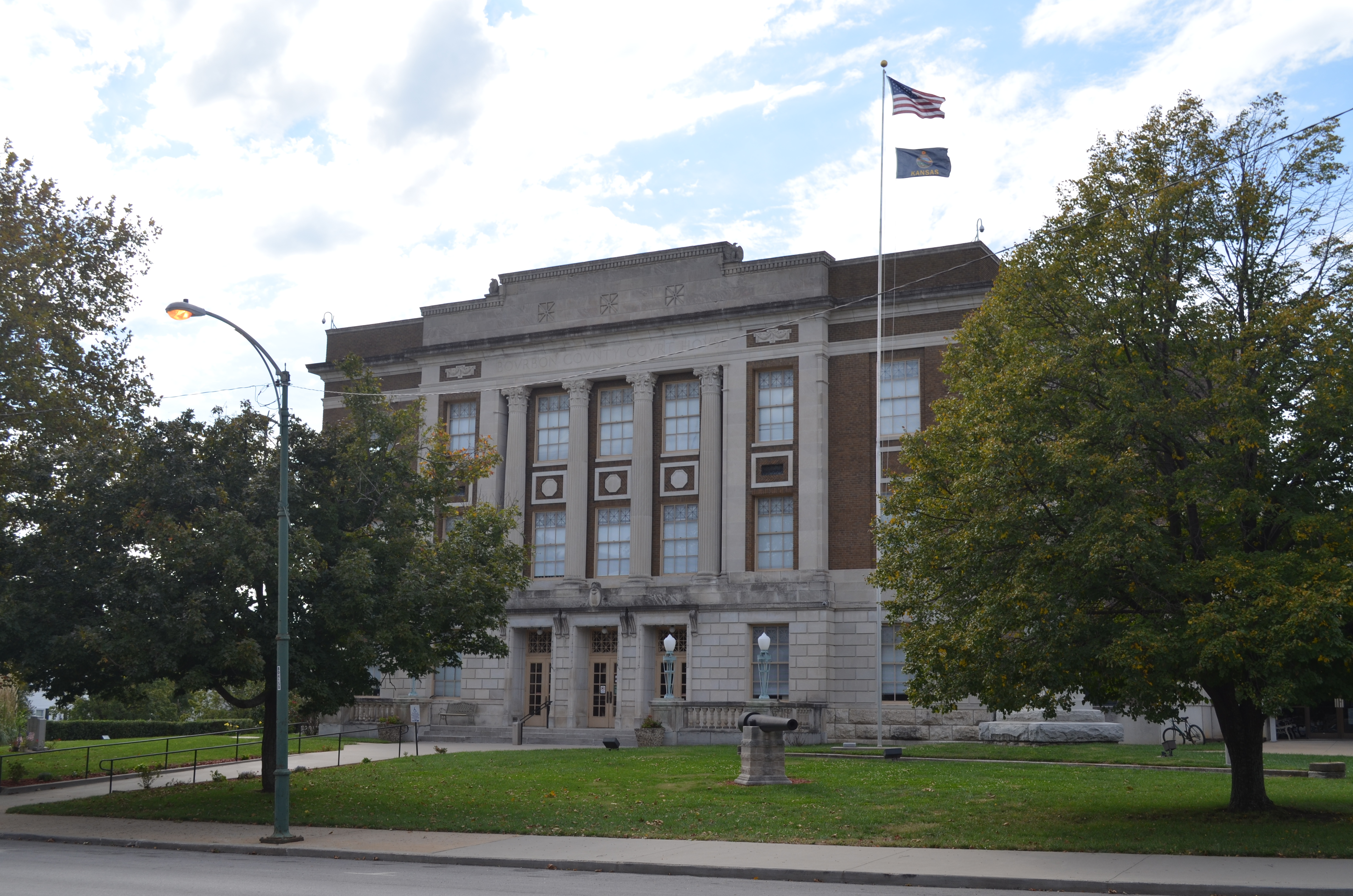

- Location within Kansas Location within the United States

General information
- Architectural style: Neoclassical
- Location: 210 South National Avenue, Fort Scott, Kansas
- Coordinates: 37°49′46″N 94°42′26″W
- Construction started: 1929
- Completed: 1930

Design and construction
- Architects: Cuthbert & Suehrk
- Main contractor: Thogmartin-Reid Construction Company

The Bourbon County Courthouse, located at 210 South National Avenue in Fort Scott, is the seat of government of Bourbon County, Kansas. Fort Scott has been the county seat since 1863; it served as the first county seat in 1855, followed by Marmaton. The courthouse was built from 1929 to 1930 by contractors Thogmartin-Reid Construction Company.

Architect Cuthbert & Suehrk of Topeka, Kansas designed the courthouse in the Neoclassical style. The courthouse is a three stories and faces east. It is constructed of brown-colored brick, stone, and concrete. Four Corinthian columns rise from the second story to the third story. The north side has a one-story annex that was originally constructed in 1971 as a jail.

The current courthouse is the third structure used as a courthouse. The first courthouse was the Fort Scott City Hall which was designed by Goodlander & Allison and built at a cost of $3,900; the courthouse occupied the second story. The second courthouse was designed by J. H. Gardner and built by James Thomson in 1887. It was destroyed by fire in 1929. Cuthbert & Suehrk also designed courthouses in Montgomery County and Norton County.

== See also ==
- List of county courthouses in Kansas
