= Barber County Courthouse (Kansas) =

- Location within Kansas Location within the United States

General information
- Architectural style: Modern
- Location: 120 East Washington Avenue, Medicine Lodge, Kansas
- Coordinates: 37°17′46″N 98°34′42″W
- Construction started: 1955
- Completed: 1956

Design and construction
- Architects: Brinkman & Hagan
- Main contractor: Frank E Blaser Construction Company of Wichita Inc.

The Barber County Courthouse, located at 125 East Washington Avenue in Medicine Lodge, is the seat of government of Barber County, Kansas. Medicine Lodge has been the county seat since 1867. The courthouse was built from 1955 to 1956 by contractors Frank E Blaser Construction Company of Wichita Inc.

Architect Brinkman & Hagan designed the courthouse in the Modern style. The courthouse is one story and faces south. It is constructed of red-colored brick and light-colored concrete with a flat roof.

The first courthouse was designed by Willis A. Ritchie and built in 1887. The current courthouse is the second structure used as a courthouse.

== See also ==
- List of county courthouses in Kansas
