= Allen County Courthouse (Kansas) =

- Location within Kansas Location within the United States

General information
- Architectural style: Modern
- Location: 1 North Washington Avenue, Iola, Kansas
- Coordinates: 37°55′17″N 95°24′19″W
- Construction started: 1957
- Completed: 1958

Design and construction
- Architects: Brink and Dunwoody
- Main contractor: Dondlinger & Sons Construction Company, Inc.

The Allen County Courthouse, located at 1 North Washington Avenue in Iola, is the seat of government of Allen County, Kansas. Iola has been the county seat since 1865. The courthouse was built from 1957 to 1958 by contractors Dondlinger & Sons Construction Company, Inc. of Iola at a total cost of $656,364.

Architect Brink and Dunwoody designed the courthouse in the Modern style. The courthouse is one story and faces west. It is constructed of red-colored brick and light-colored concrete. It is located on spacious landscaped grounds in the center of the city. The old courthouse clock (constructed in 1904) is situated on the courthouse lawn.

The first courthouse was purchased in 1866 and located in Iola; prior courthouses were located in Cofachique and Humboldt. The current courthouse is the fifth structure used as a courthouse.

== See also ==
- List of county courthouses in Kansas
