= Dickinson County Courthouse (Kansas) =

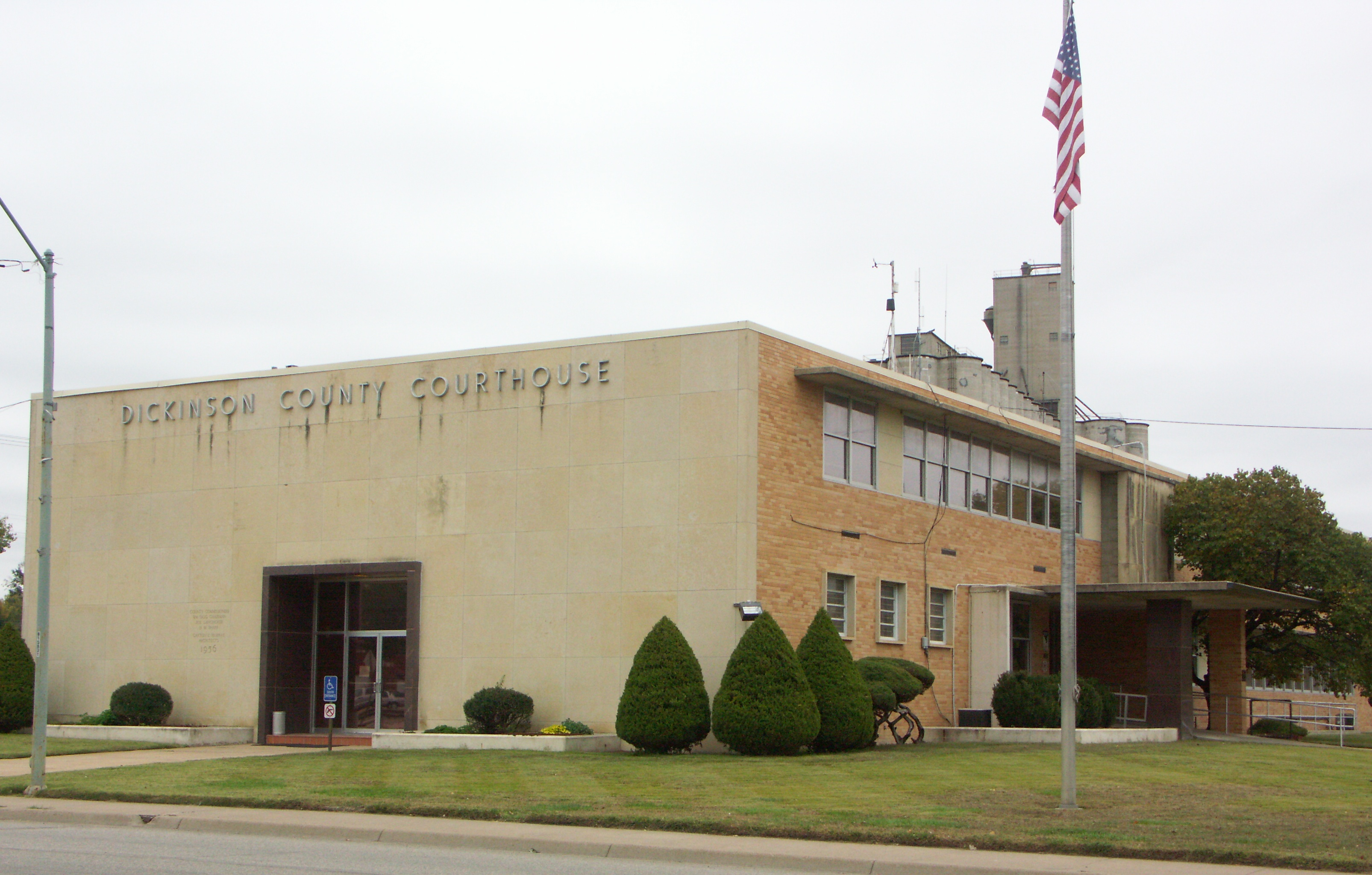

- Location within Kansas Location within the United States

General information
- Architectural style: Modern
- Location: 109 East 1st Street, Abilene, Kansas
- Coordinates: 38°54′57″N 97°12′47″W
- Construction started: 1955
- Completed: 1956

Design and construction
- Architects: Cayton and Murray
- Main contractor: Martin K. Eby Construction Company

The Dickinson County Courthouse, located at 109 East 1st Street in Abilene, is the seat of government of Dickinson County, Kansas. Abilene has been the county seat since 1857. The courthouse was built from 1955 to 1956 by contractor Martin K. Eby Construction Company of Wichita, Kansas.

Cayton and Murray designed the courthouse in the Modern style. The courthouse is located on spacious landscaped grounds south of city's center. It is two stories and faces south. It is constructed of buff-colored brick and concrete with a flat roof. The entrance has a flat concrete canopy supported by a brick column and a column clad in polished red granite.

The first courthouse was two stories and constructed of red-colored brick in 1885. An addition designed by H. M. Handley and built in 1904.

== See also ==
- List of county courthouses in Kansas
