= Wilson County Courthouse (Kansas) =

- Location within Kansas Location within the United States

General information
- Architectural style: Modern
- Location: 615 Madison Street, Fredonia, Kansas
- Coordinates: 37°32′2″N 95°49′38″W
- Construction started: 1960
- Completed: 1961

Design and construction
- Architects: Kiene & Bradley Architects
- Main contractor: Freeto Construction Company Inc.

The Wilson County Courthouse, located at 615 Madison Street in Fredonia, is the seat of government of Wilson County, Kansas. Fredonia has been the county seat since 1873. The courthouse was built from 1968 to 1969 by contractor Freeto Construction Company Inc. of Pittsburg, Kansas.

Kiene & Bradley Architects of Topeka, Kansas designed the courthouse in the Modern style. The courthouse is located on spacious landscaped grounds at the city's center. It is two stories and faces south, with the main entrance on the east side and second entrance on the west side. It is constructed of cream-colored brick, red/brown stackstone, and concrete with a flat roof. A memorial clock tower utilizing the original 1885 courthouse clock is located adjacent to the sidewalk on Monroe Street on the north side of the courthouse grounds.

The county seat was disputed from 1869 to 1873 with eight elections being held to determine in which city it would be located. The first courthouse was three stories, constructed of red brick and native stone by Gauth & Sedley in 1885 and designed by William R. Parson. It was razed to build the present courthouse.

Kiene & Bradley Architects also designed courthouses in Coffey County, Greeley County, Jefferson County, Logan County, and Neosho County.

== See also ==
- List of county courthouses in Kansas
