= Cherokee County Courthouse (Kansas) =

- Location within Kansas Location within the United States

General information
- Architectural style: Modern
- Location: 110 West Maple Street, Baxter Springs, Kansas
- Coordinates: 37°10′13″N 94°50′53″W
- Construction started: 1955
- Completed: 1956

Design and construction
- Architects: Glover and Newcomb
- Main contractor: Baumann Construction Company

The Cherokee County Courthouse, located at 110 West Maple Street in Columbus, is the seat of government of Cherokee County, Kansas. Columbus has been the county seat since 1868. The courthouse was built from 1955 to 1956 by contractor Baumann Construction Company.

Architect Glover and Newcomb of Topeka, Kansas designed the courthouse in the Modern style. The courthouse is three stories and faces north. It is constructed of yellow- and orange-colored brick, stone, and concrete with a flat roof. It is located on landscaped grounds in the center of the city. The front has a clock centered above the entrance approximately at the mid point between the first and second stories; northeast of the entrance, adjacent to the sidewalk is the clock from the 1888 courthouse.

The current courthouse is technically the fourth structure used as a courthouse. The first courthouse was a rented house on the public square. The first building erected as a courthouse was built in 1871. The second courthouse was built in 1888 by C. C. Wenzell and Schrage & Nicholas.

The first Cherokee County Courthouse was located at Pleasant View, Kansas (1855-1868) and the second county courthouse was located at Baxter Springs (1867-1868). The city of Baxter Springs erected a building in 1872 to be used as a courthouse, but it never served that purpose. It is still standing and named Johnson Library.

== See also ==
- List of county courthouses in Kansas
