= Marshall County Courthouse (Kansas) =

- U.S. National Register of Historic Places
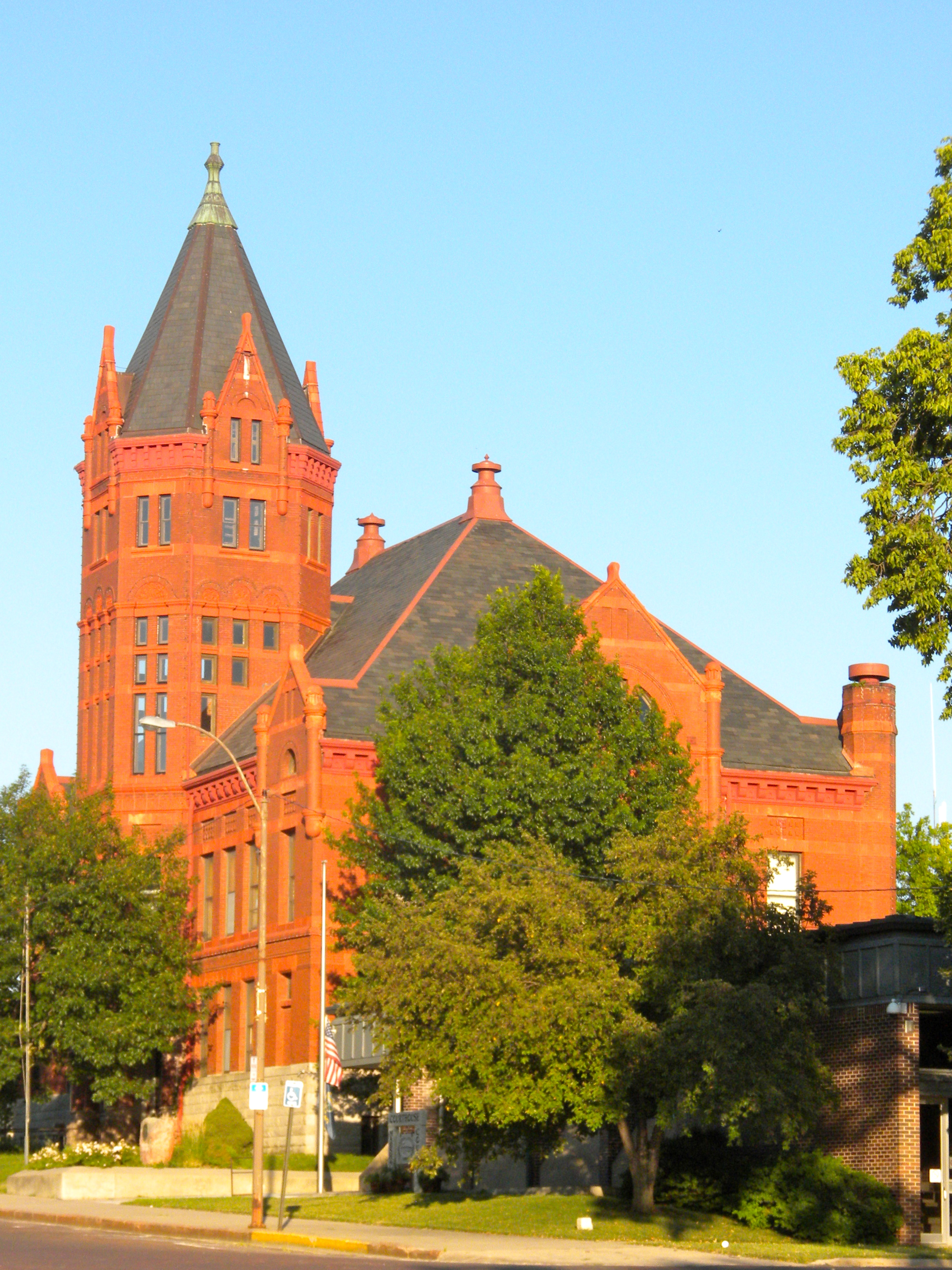

- Location within Kansas
- Location: 1207 Broadway, Marysville, Kansas
- Coordinates: 39°50′32″N 96°38′31″W
- Area: 1 acre (0.40 ha)
- Built: 1891-92
- Built by: Groves & Hackett
- Architect: Koch, H.C.
- Architectural style: Romanesque
- NRHP reference No.: 74000843
- Added to NRHP: November 5, 1974

The Marshall County Courthouse in Marysville, Kansas, located at 1207 Broadway, is a historic courthouse built in 1891–92. It was listed on the National Register of Historic Places in 1974.

It was designed by Milwaukee architect H.C. Koch and the building contractor was Groves & Hackett.

It replaced an 1873 courthouse which burned December 30, 1890 in a fire suspected to be arson.
