= Rush County Courthouse (Kansas) =

- U.S. National Register of Historic Places
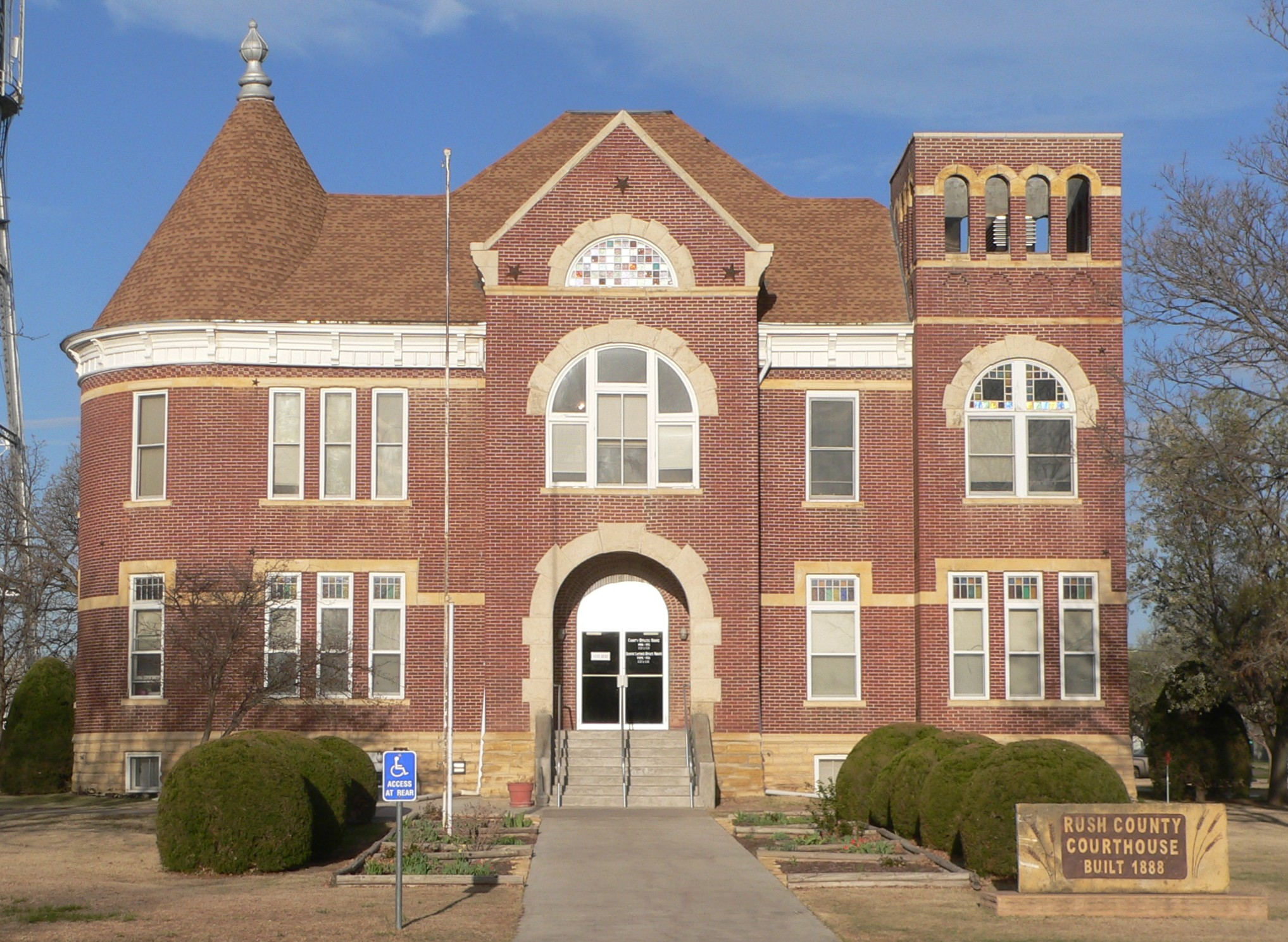
- The Rush County Courthouse in 2016

- Location within Kansas Location within the United States
- Location: 715 Elm St., La Crosse, Kansas
- Coordinates: 38°31′48″N 99°18′39″W
- Area: 2 acres (0.81 ha)
- Built: 1888
- Built by: Heaps, William, T.
- Architect: L.L. Levering
- Architectural style: Romanesque
- NRHP reference No.: 72000524
- Added to NRHP: April 13, 1972

The Rush County Courthouse in La Crosse, Kansas, was built in 1888. Located at 715 Elm St., it was listed on the National Register of Historic Places in 1972.

It serves Rush County, Kansas. It is a two-story brick building, with brick laid in common bond, on a full basement. It was funded by a $20,000 bond issue voted upon on July 10, 1888.
