= Harrison Township, Wallace County, Kansas =

Township in Wallace County, Kansas, U.S.

Harrison Township
- Township
- Location within Wallace County
- Coordinates: 38.76482°N 101.566693°W
- Country: United States
- State: Kansas
- County: Wallace

Area
  - Total: 81.157 sq mi (210.20 km^{2})
  - Land: 81.157 sq mi (210.20 km^{2})
  - Water: 0 sq mi (0 km^{2}) 0%

Population (2020)
  - Total: 91
  - Density: 1.1/sq mi (0.43/km^{2})
- Time zone: UTC-7 (MST)
  - Summer (DST): UTC-6 (MDT)
- Area code: 785
- GNIS feature ID: 471863

Harrison Township is a township in Wallace County, Kansas, United States. As of the 2020 census, its population was 91.

== History ==
Harrison Township was home to two now-extinct towns: Dinas and Ladder. Dinas was established in 1889 as Macon, changing to Dinas on May 28, 1901. It had a peak population of 27 in 1910 and its post office closed in 1917. Ladder had its post office opened in 1888 and was founded as Mell. The name changed to Ladder on November 19, 1895. The post office closed and reopened multiple times before being closed for good in 1924.

== Geography ==
Harrison Township covers an area of 81.157 square miles (210.20 km^{2}), all of it land.

=== Adjacent townships ===
Wallace Township, Wallace County
		north	northeast	Western Township, Logan County
Sharon Springs Township, Wallace County	west	self	east	Augustine Township, Logan County
Tribune Township, Greeley County	southwest		southeast	Leoti Township, Wichita County

== Demographics ==
As of the 2020 census, the township had a population of 91, giving a population density of 1.1 people per square mile (0.42 people/km^{2}). The racial makeup of the township was 92.3% White, 1.1% from some other race, and 6.6% from two or more races. Hispanics or Latinos of any race were 1.1% of the population.

The 2020–2024 American Community Survey estimated that the township contained 35 households and 35 housing units.
