= Sharon Springs, Kansas =

City in Wallace County, Kansas

- City and County seat
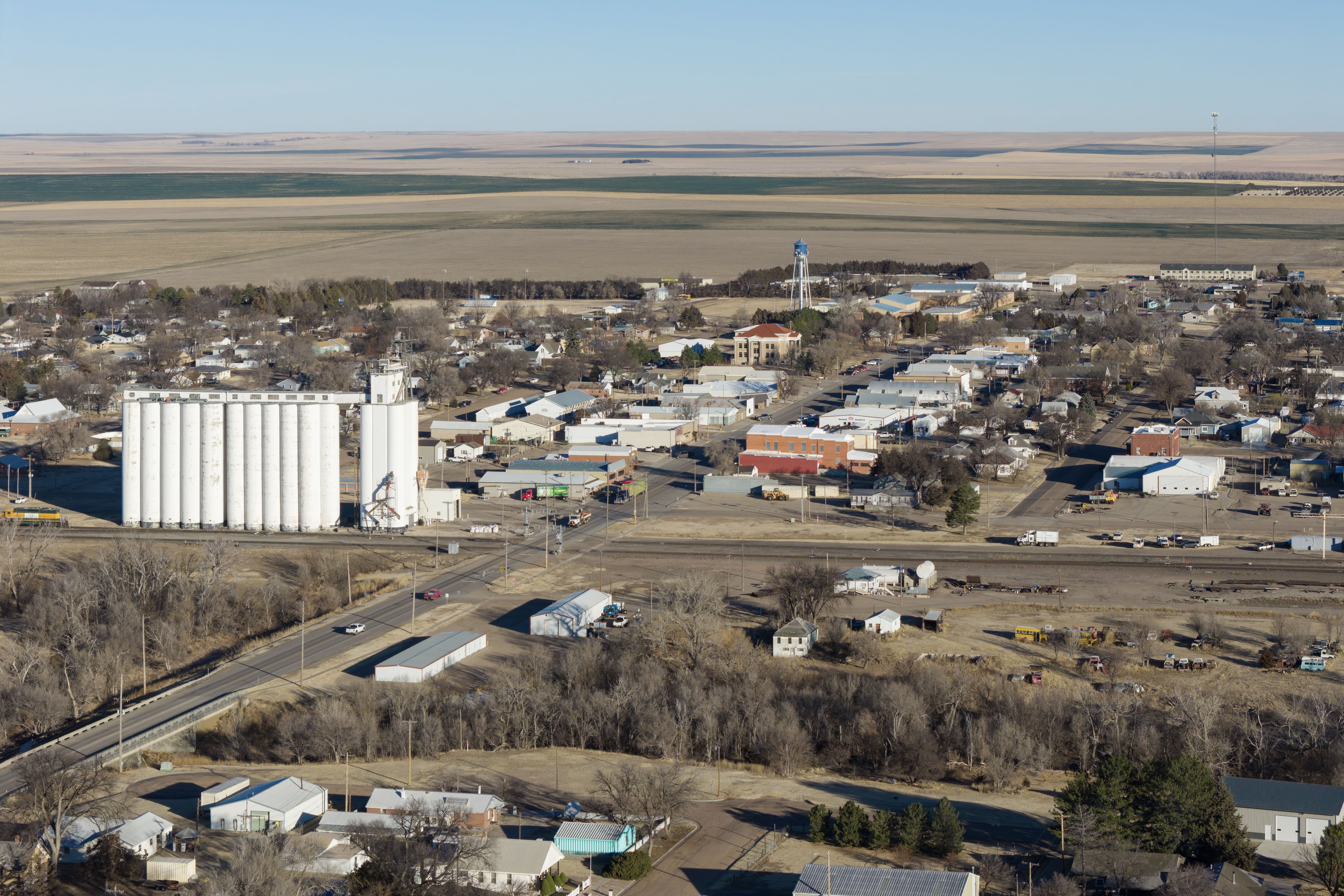
- Downtown (2026)

- Location within Wallace County and Kansas

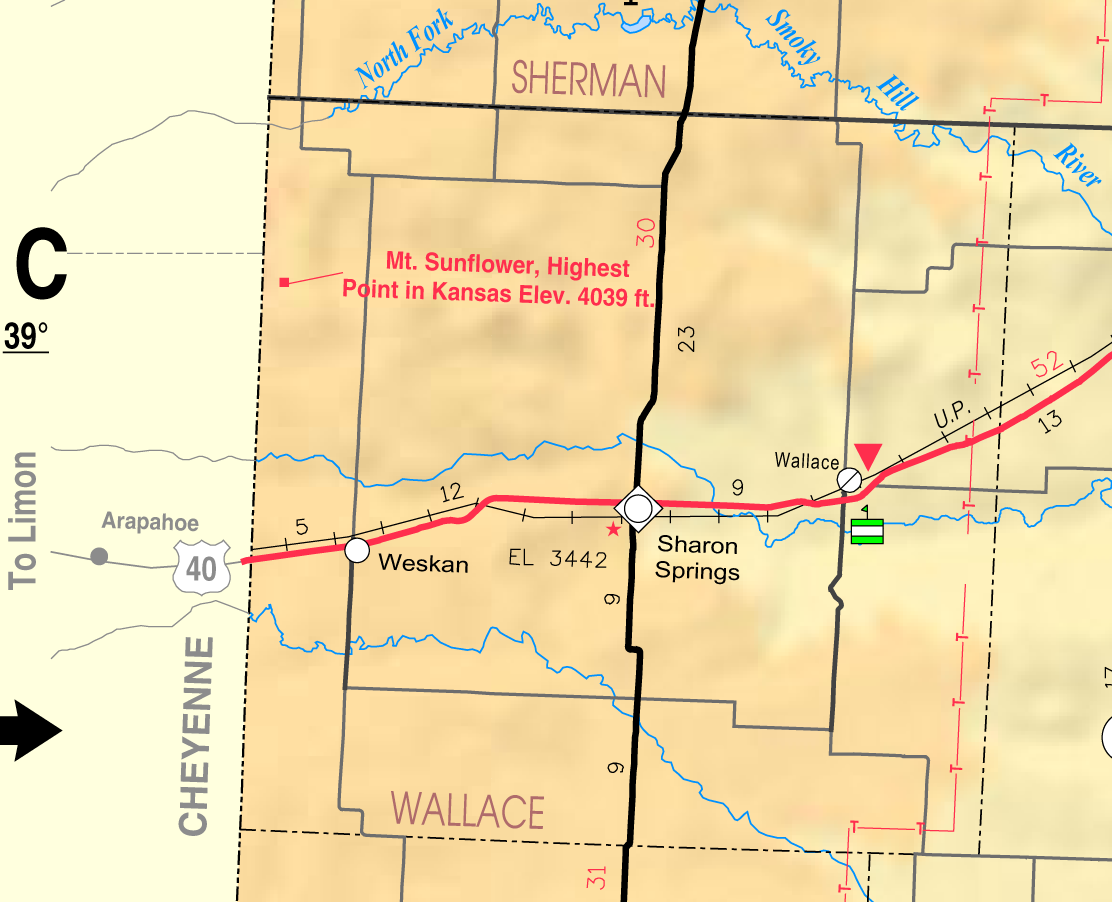
- KDOT map of Wallace County (legend)
- Coordinates: 38°53′40″N 101°45′04″W
- Country: United States
- State: Kansas
- County: Wallace
- Founded: 1868
- Incorporated: 1890
- Named for: Sharon Springs, New York

Area
  - Total: 0.90 sq mi (2.34 km^{2})
  - Land: 0.90 sq mi (2.34 km^{2})
  - Water: 0 sq mi (0.00 km^{2})
- Elevation: 3,442 ft (1,049 m)

Population (2020)
  - Total: 751
  - Density: 831/sq mi (321/km^{2})
- Time zone: UTC-7 (Mountain (MST))
  - Summer (DST): UTC-6 (MDT)
- ZIP Code: 67758
- Area code: 785
- FIPS code: 20-64375
- GNIS ID: 2395858

Sharon Springs is a city in and the county seat of Wallace County, Kansas, United States. As of the 2020 census, the population of the city was 751.

== History ==
Sharon Springs was originally called Eagle Tail station when it was founded in 1868. It was renamed Sharon Springs in 1886, after Sharon Springs, New York. Sharon Springs was incorporated as a city in 1890.

In 2013, the largest sinkhole in Kansas opened north of Sharon Springs. As of December 2013, the sinkhole was approximately 88 feet (27 m) deep and 243 feet (74 m) across.

On April 22, 2022, a high-end EF1 tornado caused severe damage to the city.

== Geography ==
According to the United States Census Bureau, the city has a total area of 0.91 square miles (2.36 km^{2}), all land.

=== Climate ===
According to the Köppen Climate Classification system, Sharon Springs has a semi-arid climate, abbreviated "BSk" on climate maps.

Climate data for Sharon Springs, Kansas, 1991–2020 normals, extremes 1893–present
Month	Jan	Feb	Mar	Apr	May	Jun	Jul	Aug	Sep	Oct	Nov	Dec	Year
Record high °F (°C)	85 (29)	82 (28)	90 (32)	98 (37)	103 (39)	112 (44)	109 (43)	110 (43)	106 (41)	100 (38)	92 (33)	82 (28)	112 (44)
Mean maximum °F (°C)	67.4 (19.7)	70.5 (21.4)	80.3 (26.8)	87.2 (30.7)	94.2 (34.6)	101.3 (38.5)	102.8 (39.3)	100.8 (38.2)	96.9 (36.1)	89.3 (31.8)	77.2 (25.1)	66.8 (19.3)	104.1 (40.1)
Mean daily maximum °F (°C)	43.7 (6.5)	46.1 (7.8)	56.5 (13.6)	64.9 (18.3)	74.5 (23.6)	86.3 (30.2)	91.2 (32.9)	88.4 (31.3)	80.9 (27.2)	67.8 (19.9)	54.2 (12.3)	44.1 (6.7)	66.6 (19.2)
Daily mean °F (°C)	30.5 (−0.8)	32.7 (0.4)	42.1 (5.6)	50.8 (10.4)	61.2 (16.2)	72.4 (22.4)	77.7 (25.4)	75.2 (24.0)	66.9 (19.4)	53.1 (11.7)	40.4 (4.7)	31.4 (−0.3)	52.9 (11.6)
Mean daily minimum °F (°C)	17.3 (−8.2)	19.4 (−7.0)	27.8 (−2.3)	36.7 (2.6)	47.9 (8.8)	58.6 (14.8)	64.1 (17.8)	62.0 (16.7)	52.9 (11.6)	38.4 (3.6)	26.5 (−3.1)	18.6 (−7.4)	39.2 (4.0)
Mean minimum °F (°C)	−0.6 (−18.1)	3.0 (−16.1)	10.4 (−12.0)	21.6 (−5.8)	33.1 (0.6)	46.0 (7.8)	55.2 (12.9)	52.6 (11.4)	38.7 (3.7)	22.1 (−5.5)	10.3 (−12.1)	1.6 (−16.9)	−5.7 (−20.9)
Record low °F (°C)	−20 (−29)	−23 (−31)	−18 (−28)	8 (−13)	21 (−6)	33 (1)	41 (5)	44 (7)	22 (−6)	6 (−14)	−8 (−22)	−22 (−30)	−23 (−31)
Average precipitation inches (mm)	0.40 (10)	0.59 (15)	0.95 (24)	1.80 (46)	2.58 (66)	2.77 (70)	3.86 (98)	2.96 (75)	1.57 (40)	1.27 (32)	0.65 (17)	0.45 (11)	19.85 (504)
Average snowfall inches (cm)	3.2 (8.1)	4.7 (12)	3.3 (8.4)	1.4 (3.6)	0.1 (0.25)	0.0 (0.0)	0.0 (0.0)	0.0 (0.0)	0.1 (0.25)	1.4 (3.6)	2.3 (5.8)	4.5 (11)	21.0 (53)
Average precipitation days (≥ 0.01 in)	2.3	2.4	3.3	4.9	6.6	6.3	7.0	6.6	3.3	3.8	2.8	2.3	51.6
Average snowy days (≥ 0.1 in)	1.6	1.9	1.3	0.5	0.0	0.0	0.0	0.0	0.0	0.3	1.1	1.9	8.6
Source 1: NOAA
Source 2: National Weather Service

== Demographics ==
Historical population
Census	Pop.	Note	%±
1890	178		—
1900	180		1.1%
1910	440		144.4%
1920	815		85.2%
1930	792		−2.8%
1940	760		−4.0%
1950	994		30.8%
1960	966		−2.8%
1970	1,012		4.8%
1980	982		−3.0%
1990	872		−11.2%
2000	835		−4.2%
2010	748		−10.4%
2020	751		0.4%
U.S. Decennial Census

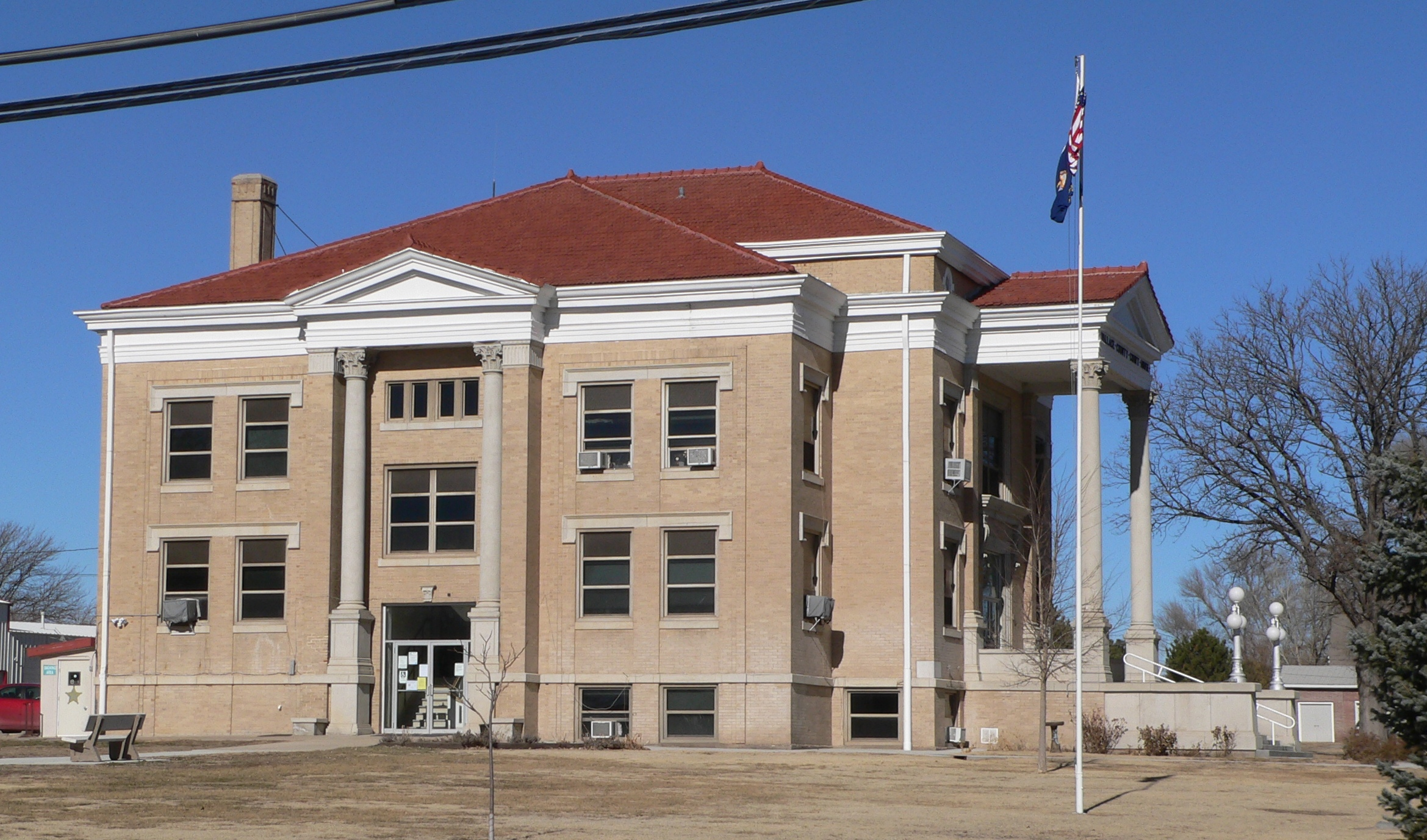
Wallace County Courthouse (2010)

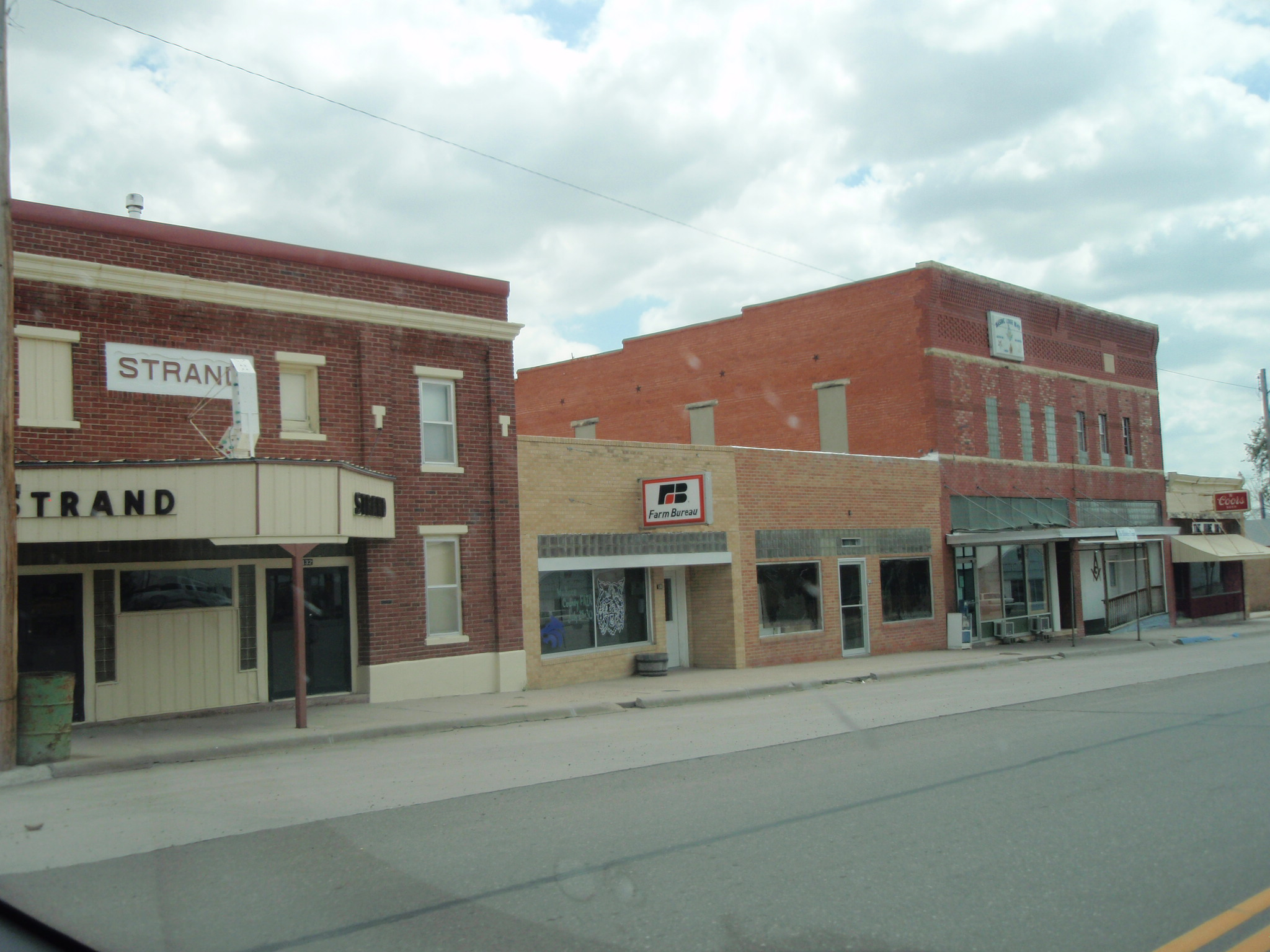
Sharon Springs Kansas Business District (2011)

=== 2010 census ===
As of the census of 2010, there were 748 people, 327 households, and 197 families residing in the city. The population density was 822.0 inhabitants per square mile (317.4/km^{2}). There were 407 housing units at an average density of 447.3 per square mile (172.7/km^{2}). The racial makeup of the city was 94.5% White, 0.1% African American, 0.4% Native American, 3.6% from other races, and 1.3% from two or more races. Hispanic or Latino of any race were 5.7% of the population.

There were 327 households, of which 27.2% had children under the age of 18 living with them, 51.7% were married couples living together, 6.1% had a female householder with no husband present, 2.4% had a male householder with no wife present, and 39.8% were non-families. 38.2% of all households were made up of individuals, and 22.3% had someone living alone who was 65 years of age or older. The average household size was 2.23 and the average family size was 2.99.

The median age in the city was 45.3 years. 25.5% of residents were under the age of 18; 4.9% were between the ages of 18 and 24; 19.2% were from 25 to 44; 25.4% were from 45 to 64; and 25% were 65 years of age or older. The gender makeup of the city was 48.8% male and 51.2% female.

=== 2000 census ===
As of the census of 2000, there were 835 people, 354 households, and 227 families residing in the city. The population density was 900.0 inhabitants per square mile (347.5/km^{2}). There were 408 housing units at an average density of 439.8 per square mile (169.8/km^{2}). The racial makeup of the city was 96.05% White, 0.24% African American, 0.48% Native American, 1.68% from other races, and 1.56% from two or more races. Hispanic or Latino of any race were 4.31% of the population.

There were 354 households, out of which 29.7% had children under the age of 18 living with them, 57.3% were married couples living together, 3.7% had a female householder with no husband present, and 35.6% were non-families. 33.9% of all households were made up of individuals, and 17.8% had someone living alone who was 65 years of age or older. The average household size was 2.29 and the average family size was 2.93.

In the city, the population was spread out, with 24.2% under the age of 18, 7.9% from 18 to 24, 22.5% from 25 to 44, 21.3% from 45 to 64, and 24.1% who were 65 years of age or older. The median age was 42 years. For every 100 females, there were 90.2 males. For every 100 females age 18 and over, there were 95.4 males.

The median income for a household in the city was $33,333, and the median income for a family was $43,684. Males had a median income of $27,500 versus $14,600 for females. The per capita income for the city was $17,656. About 4.3% of families and 7.3% of the population were below the poverty line, including 6.7% of those under age 18 and 10.8% of those age 65 or over.

== Education ==
The community is served by the Wallace County USD 241 public school district.

== Transportation ==
Sharon Springs is located on U.S. Route 40.
