= Osage County Courthouse (Kansas) =

- U.S. National Register of Historic Places
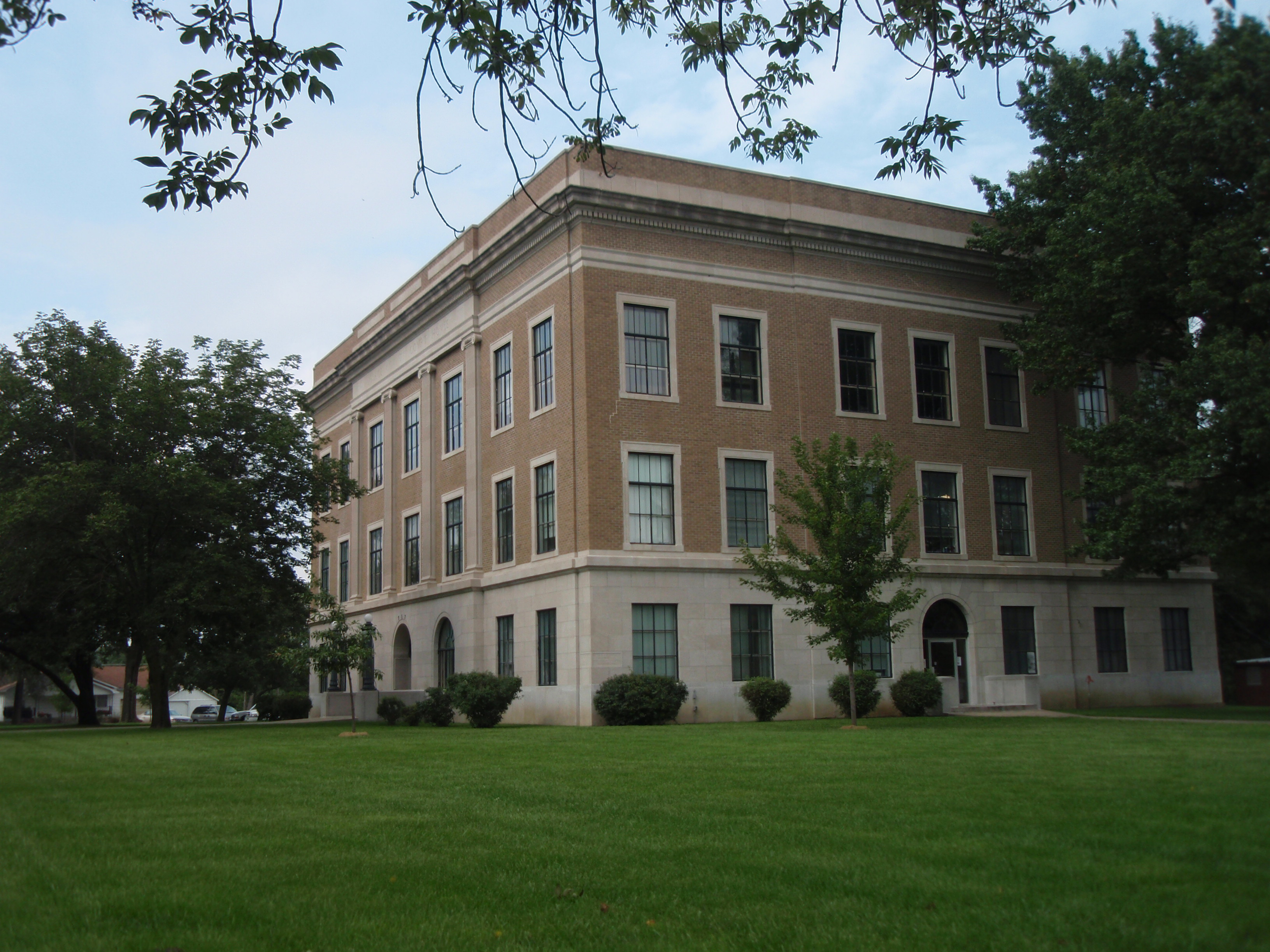
- The Osage County Courthouse in 2009

- Location within Kansas Location within the United States
- Location: 717 Topeka Ave., Lyndon, Kansas
- Coordinates: 38°36′37″N 95°41′0″W
- Area: 5.3 acres (2.1 ha)
- Built: 1923
- Architect: W.W. Hulse
- Architectural style: Late 19th And 20th Century Revivals
- MPS: County Courthouses of Kansas MPS
- NRHP reference No.: 07000320
- Added to NRHP: April 18, 2007

The Osage County Courthouse in Lyndon, Kansas, is a historic courthouse built in 1923. Located at 717 Topeka Avenue, it was listed on the National Register of Historic Places in 2007.

The courthouse is a three-story reinforced concrete building faced with tooled limestone on its first floor, and brick and clay tile above. It has frame floors and a frame/steel truss roof. It is about 100 by 83 feet (30 m × 25 m) in plan.

The listing included two contributing buildings (the courthouse and a jail building) and two non-contributing ones (another jail building and a shed). It also includes three contributing objects (a World War I memorial, a flag pole, a Korean War memorial) and two non-contributing objects (a 1969 Memorial and a Vietnam War memorial).
