= Wallace County, Kansas =

County in Kansas, United States

- County
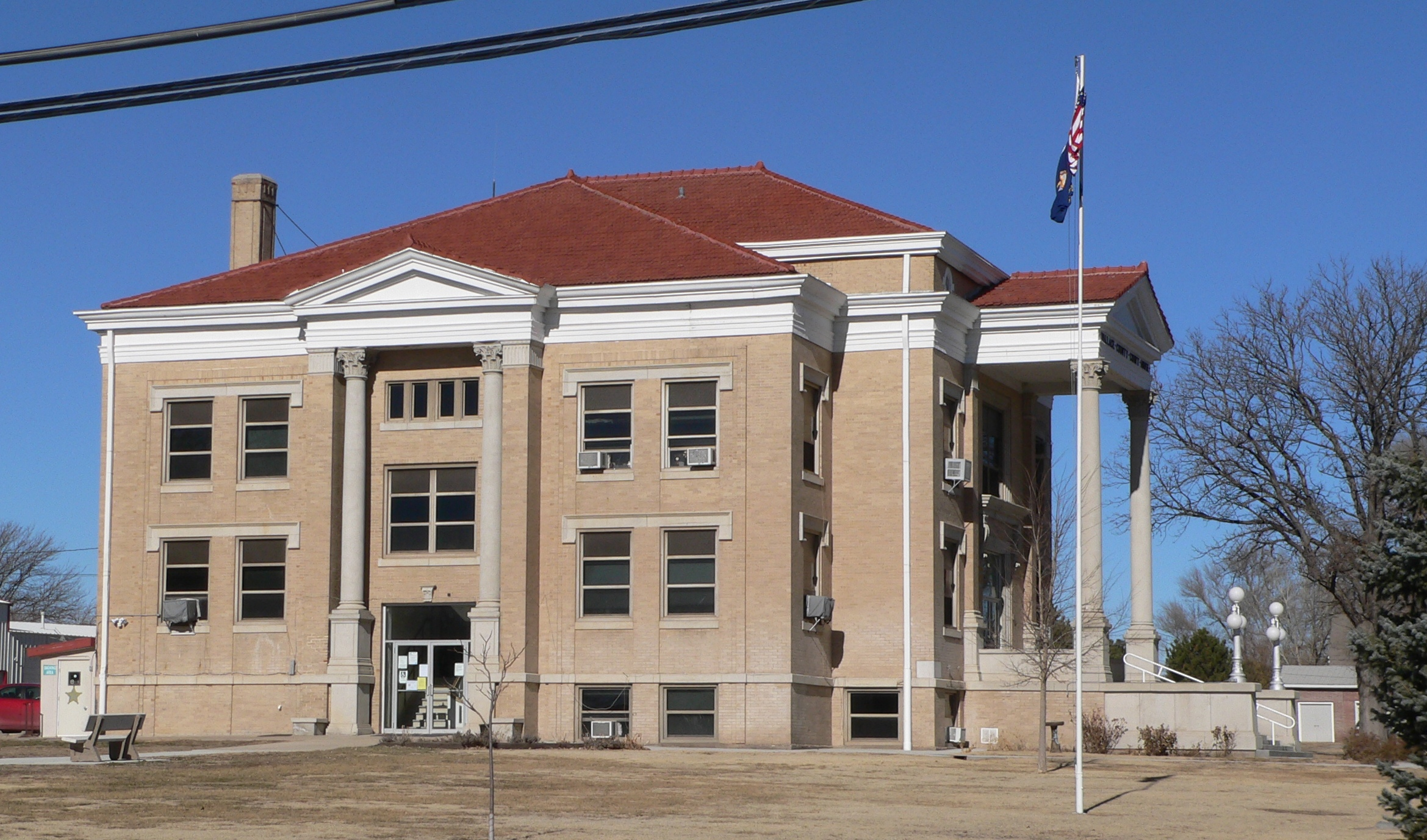
- Wallace County Courthouse in Sharon Springs (2010)

- Location within the U.S. state of Kansas
- Coordinates: 38°45′52″N 101°34′33″W
- Country: United States
- State: Kansas
- Founded: 1868
- Named for: W. H. L. Wallace
- Seat: Sharon Springs
- Largest city: Sharon Springs

Area
  - Total: 914 sq mi (2,370 km^{2})
  - Land: 914 sq mi (2,370 km^{2})
  - Water: 0.05 sq mi (0.13 km^{2}) 0.01%

Population (2020)
  - Total: 1,512
  - Estimate (2025): 1,441 ▼
  - Density: 1.7/sq mi (0.66/km^{2})
- Time zone: UTC−7 (Mountain)
  - Summer (DST): UTC−6 (MDT)
- Congressional district: 1st
- Website: wallacecountyks.gov

Wallace County is a county located in the U.S. state of Kansas. Its county seat is Sharon Springs. As of the 2020 census, the county population was 1,512, making it the second-least populous county in Kansas (Greeley County is the least). The county was created in 1868 and named in honor of Brigadier General W. H. L. Wallace, who had been mortally wounded in combat in the Battle of Shiloh. Wallace County is home to Mount Sunflower, the highest point in Kansas at 4,039 feet (1,231 meters). Mount Sunflower is located approximately 15 miles (24 km) north-northwest of Weskan, less than one mile (1.6 km) from the Colorado state line. It is one of four Kansas counties to use the Mountain Time Zone rather than the Central Time Zone like the remainder of Kansas.

== History ==
=== Early history ===
For many millennia, the Great Plains of North America was inhabited by nomadic Native Americans. From the 16th century to 18th century, the Kingdom of France claimed ownership of large parts of North America. In 1762, after the French and Indian War, France secretly ceded New France to Spain, per the Treaty of Fontainebleau.

=== 19th century ===
In 1802, Spain returned most of the land to France, but keeping title to about 7,500 square miles. In 1803, most of the land for modern day Kansas was acquired by the United States from France as part of the 828,000 square mile Louisiana Purchase for 2.83 cents per acre.

In 1854, the Kansas Territory was organized, then in 1861 Kansas became the 34th U.S. state. In 1868, Wallace County was established.

== Geography ==
According to the United States Census Bureau, the county has a total area of 914 square miles (2,370 km^{2}), of which 914 square miles (2,370 km^{2}) is land and 0.05 square miles (0.13 km^{2}) (0.01%) is water.

=== Adjacent counties ===
- Sherman County (north)
- Logan County (east/Central Time border)
- Wichita County (southeast/Central Time border)
- Greeley County (south)
- Cheyenne County, Colorado (west)
- Kit Carson County, Colorado (northwest)

== Demographics ==
Historical population
Census	Pop.	Note	%±
1870	538		—
1880	686		27.5%
1890	2,468		259.8%
1900	1,178		−52.3%
1910	2,759		134.2%
1920	2,424		−12.1%
1930	2,882		18.9%
1940	2,216		−23.1%
1950	2,508		13.2%
1960	2,069		−17.5%
1970	2,215		7.1%
1980	2,045		−7.7%
1990	1,821		−11.0%
2000	1,749		−4.0%
2010	1,485		−15.1%
2020	1,512		1.8%
2025 (est.)	1,441	▼	−4.7%
U.S. Decennial Census; 1790-1960 1900-1990; 1990-2000 2010-2020

=== 2020 census ===
As of the 2020 census, the county had a population of 1,512. The median age was 42.6 years. 25.7% of residents were under the age of 18 and 23.0% of residents were 65 years of age or older. For every 100 females there were 94.3 males, and for every 100 females age 18 and over there were 97.2 males age 18 and over.

The racial makeup of the county was 90.6% White, 0.2% Black or African American, 0.3% American Indian and Alaska Native, 0.0% Asian, 0.1% Native Hawaiian and Pacific Islander, 3.0% from some other race, and 5.7% from two or more races. Hispanic or Latino residents of any race comprised 5.3% of the population.

0.0% of residents lived in urban areas, while 100.0% lived in rural areas.

There were 608 households in the county, of which 27.8% had children under the age of 18 living with them and 21.5% had a female householder with no spouse or partner present. About 31.9% of all households were made up of individuals and 14.2% had someone living alone who was 65 years of age or older.

There were 740 housing units, of which 17.8% were vacant. Among occupied housing units, 75.8% were owner-occupied and 24.2% were renter-occupied. The homeowner vacancy rate was 1.5% and the rental vacancy rate was 19.6%.

=== 2000 census ===
As of the census of 2000, there were 1,749 people, 674 households, and 477 families residing in the county. The population density was 2 people per square mile (0.77 people/km^{2}). There were 791 housing units at an average density of 1 per square mile (0.39/km^{2}). The racial makeup of the county was 94.63% White, 0.63% Black or African American, 0.80% Native American, 0.17% Asian, 2.52% from other races, and 1.26% from two or more races. 4.80% of the population were Hispanic or Latino of any race.

There were 674 households, out of which 33.80% had children under the age of 18 living with them, 63.60% were married couples living together, 4.00% had a female householder with no husband present, and 29.20% were non-families. 27.60% of all households were made up of individuals, and 13.60% had someone living alone who was 65 years of age or older. The average household size was 2.56 and the average family size was 3.12.

In the county, the population was spread out, with 29.10% under the age of 18, 6.50% from 18 to 24, 23.60% from 25 to 44, 22.80% from 45 to 64, and 18.10% who were 65 years of age or older. The median age was 40 years. For every 100 females there were 99.00 males. For every 100 females age 18 and over, there were 99.40 males.

The median income for a household in the county was $33,000, and the median income for a family was $42,022. Males had a median income of $25,610 versus $18,333 for females. The per capita income for the county was $17,016. About 10.70% of families and 16.10% of the population were below the poverty line, including 24.50% of those under age 18 and 12.70% of those age 65 or over.

== Government ==
=== Presidential elections ===
Presidential election results

United States presidential election results for Wallace County, Kansas
Year	Republican		Democratic		Third party(ies)	
Year	No.	%	No.	%	No.	%
1888	412	65.71%	198	31.58%	17	2.71%
1892	377	55.93%	0	0.00%	297	44.07%
1896	181	59.34%	124	40.66%	0	0.00%
1900	212	66.25%	102	31.88%	6	1.88%
1904	278	83.99%	39	11.78%	14	4.23%
1908	350	59.32%	206	34.92%	34	5.76%
1912	81	15.17%	152	28.46%	301	56.37%
1916	381	39.48%	497	51.50%	87	9.02%
1920	632	70.38%	203	22.61%	63	7.02%
1924	603	53.70%	171	15.23%	349	31.08%
1928	738	66.19%	356	31.93%	21	1.88%
1932	561	40.27%	761	54.63%	71	5.10%
1936	658	56.68%	492	42.38%	11	0.95%
1940	756	67.08%	361	32.03%	10	0.89%
1944	720	70.80%	292	28.71%	5	0.49%
1948	637	58.23%	439	40.13%	18	1.65%
1952	945	78.82%	249	20.77%	5	0.42%
1956	684	72.69%	251	26.67%	6	0.64%
1960	727	68.20%	339	31.80%	0	0.00%
1964	516	50.69%	496	48.72%	6	0.59%
1968	608	61.54%	235	23.79%	145	14.68%
1972	782	73.22%	214	20.04%	72	6.74%
1976	600	52.77%	486	42.74%	51	4.49%
1980	811	78.28%	167	16.12%	58	5.60%
1984	838	82.97%	152	15.05%	20	1.98%
1988	655	69.61%	257	27.31%	29	3.08%
1992	679	63.70%	164	15.38%	223	20.92%
1996	738	76.24%	160	16.53%	70	7.23%
2000	737	85.60%	103	11.96%	21	2.44%
2004	742	84.70%	112	12.79%	22	2.51%
2008	690	85.82%	96	11.94%	18	2.24%
2012	719	90.10%	68	8.52%	11	1.38%
2016	721	90.35%	46	5.76%	31	3.88%
2020	770	93.33%	44	5.33%	11	1.33%
2024	686	91.71%	52	6.95%	10	1.34%

Wallace has long been one of the most overwhelmingly Republican of all the state's counties. Only two Democratic presidential nominees have ever won Wallace County – Woodrow Wilson in 1916 and Franklin D. Roosevelt in 1932. Since 1944 only three Democratic presidential candidates have won 31 percent of Wallace County's vote – Harry S. Truman in 1948, Lyndon Johnson in 1964 and Jimmy Carter in 1976 – whilst since 1980 only Michael Dukakis during the drought-affected 1988 election has obtained so much as seventeen percent for the Democratic Party. Indeed, in the 2016 election Hillary Clinton recorded less than six percent of the county's vote, whilst the last seven Republican nominees have all exceeded 80 percent. In the 2012, 2016, 2020, and 2024 elections, Wallace was the only county in Kansas to give over 90% of the vote to the Republican nominee, namely Mitt Romney followed by Donald Trump.

=== Laws ===
Although the Kansas Constitution was amended in 1986 to allow the sale of alcoholic liquor by the individual drink with the approval of voters, Wallace County has remained a prohibition, or "dry", county, the only such county remaining in the state as of March 2023.

== Education ==
=== Unified school districts ===
- Wallace County USD 241
- Weskan USD 242

== Communities ==
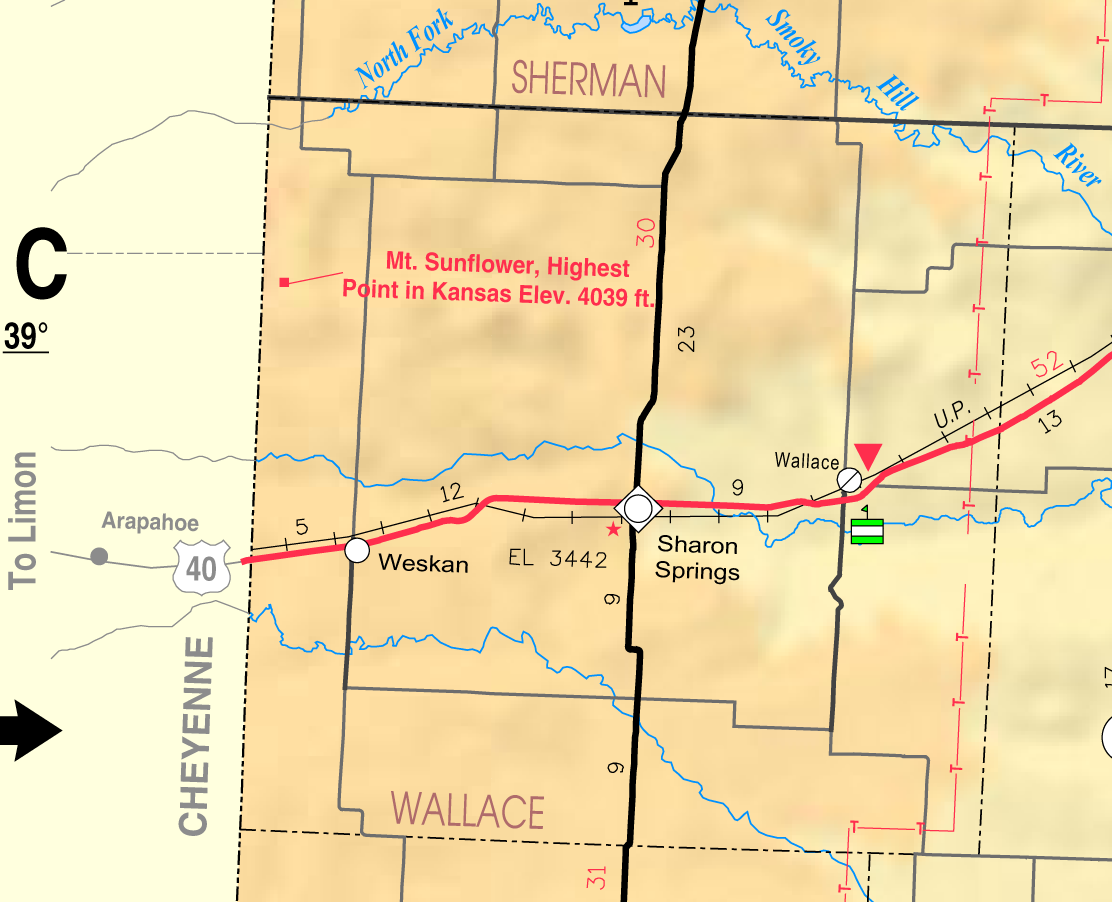
2005 map of Wallace County (legend)

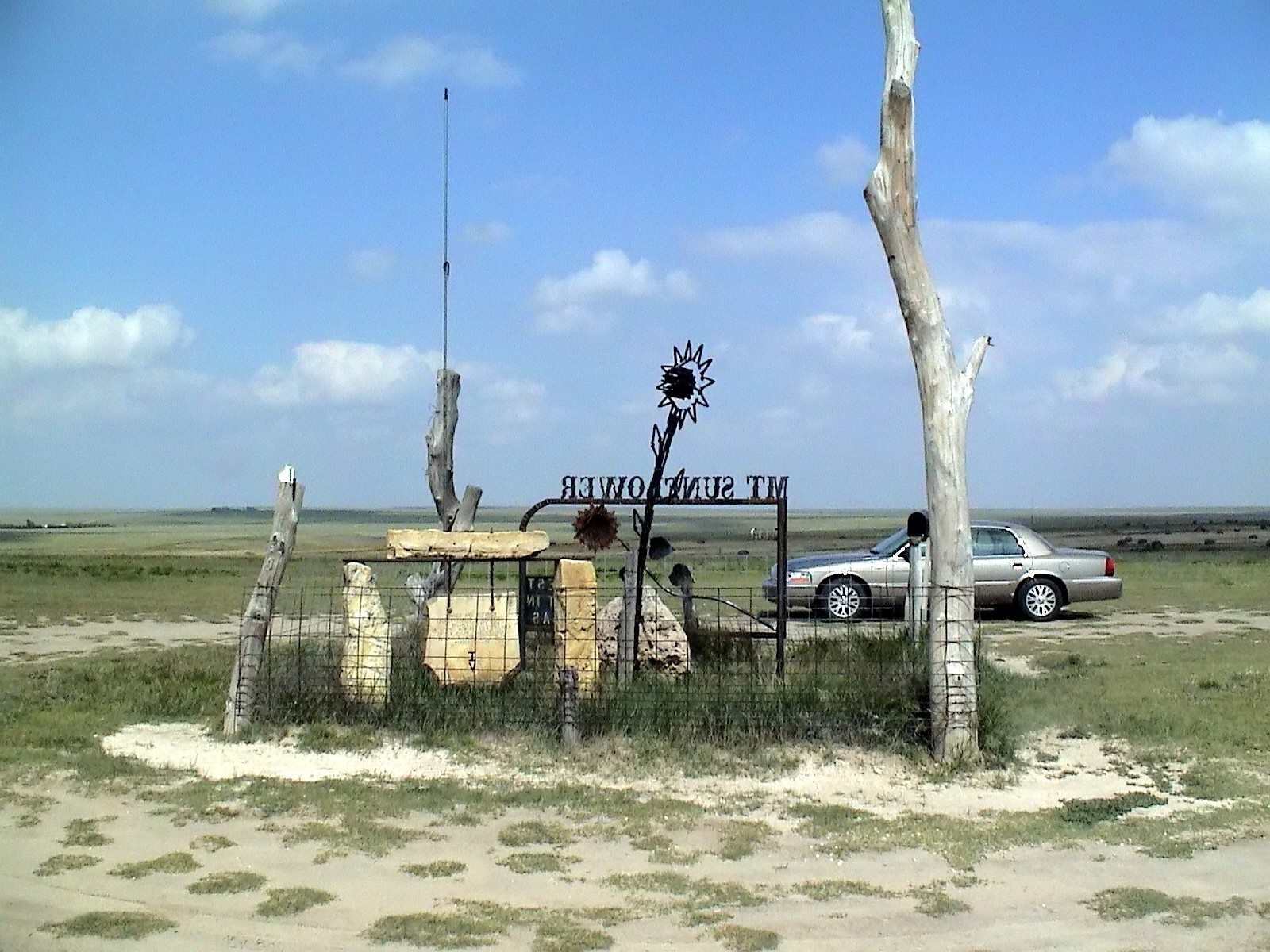
"Mount Sunflower," the highest point in Kansas, is located in Wallace County

List of townships / incorporated cities / unincorporated communities / extinct former communities within Wallace County.
† means a community is designated a Census-Designated Place (CDP) by the United States Census Bureau.

=== Cities ===
- Sharon Springs (county seat)
- Wallace

=== Unincorporated communities ===
- Weskan†

=== Townships ===
Wallace County is divided into four townships. None of the cities within the county are considered governmentally independent, and all figures for the townships include those of the cities. In the following table, the population center is the largest city (or cities) included in that township's population total, if it is of a significant size.

Sources: 2000 U.S. Gazetteer from the U.S. Census Bureau.
Township	FIPS	Population center	Population	Population density /km^{2} (/sq mi)	Land area km^{2} (sq mi)	Water area km^{2} (sq mi)	Water %	Geographic coordinates
Harrison	30450		85	0 (1)	210 (81)	0 (0)	0%	38°45′53″N 101°34′34″W
Sharon Springs	64400	Sharon Springs	1,096	1 (3)	885 (342)	0 (0)	0%	38°54′12″N 101°45′3″W
Wallace	74775	Wallace	175	0 (1)	488 (188)	0 (0)	0.01%	38°58′15″N 101°33′35″W
Weskan	76700	Weskan	393	1 (1)	784 (303)	0 (0)	0.01%	38°53′8″N 101°56′10″W

== See also ==
- National Register of Historic Places listings in Wallace County, Kansas
