= Benjamin F. Goss =

American politician

Benjamin Franklin Goss (April 24, 1823 – July 6, 1893) was an American farmer, printer and merchant from Pewaukee, Wisconsin, who served two terms in the Wisconsin State Assembly from Waukesha County: one in 1855 as a Whig, and the other in 1893 as a Democrat. In the interim, he had spent some time in Illinois, Iowa, and Kansas, and served as an officer in the American Civil War. In his later years, his greatest fame was as an amateur ornithologist.

== Early life ==
Goss was born April 24, 1823, in Lancaster, New Hampshire, received a public school and academic education, and learned the printer's trade. He worked as a printer until he moved with his family to Wisconsin Territory in 1841, and eventually purchased and farmed 160 acres of land near the east end of Pewaukee Lake. On January 21, 1851, he was married in Pewaukee to Abby B. Bradley, a native of Cayuga County, New York; they had one child, Clara F. Goss.

In 1854, he was elected to the State Assembly from the north-east district of Waukesha County for the session of 1855 as a Whig, to succeed fellow Whig Chauncey Purple.

== Leaving Wisconsin ==
After the 1855 Assembly session ended (Goss was succeeded in the next session by Democrat James Weaver of Lisbon), he moved to Freeport, Illinois, to join his brother N. S. Goss in operating a large grocery store for about one year; he then moved to Waverly, Iowa, and went into the real estate business for about two years, after which he moved on to Neosho Falls, Kansas, where he (along with his brother N. S. Goss and two others) formed a company, purchased several hundred acres of land, platted Neosho Falls, built a dam, erected mills, and made other improvements. He continued doing business at Neosho Falls until October, 1861, when (the American Civil War being under way) he organized a company of cavalry of which he was elected captain; the company became Company F of the 9th Regiment Kansas Volunteer Cavalry. Company F was in the battles of Cane Hill and Prairie Grove and many smaller engagements. For a large part of their service time they were stationed on the frontier, serving as scouts. They were mustered out of the service in January, 1865, "Goss having served as its captain, participating in every march, movement, etc., his command was in". Shortly after his return from the army, he sold his interests in Neosho Falls.

== Return to Wisconsin ==
In 1866, he returned to Pewaukee and became a prosperous and successful merchant, also holding various offices in the Village of Pewaukee. In 1892, he was again elected to the Assembly from the second Waukesha County district (Towns of Delafleld, Eagle, Genesee, Merton, Mukwonago, Ottawa, Oconomowoc, Summit, Lisbon and Pewaukee; and the city of Oconomowoc) as a Democrat with 1,968 votes, thus by four votes unseating Republican incumbent Omar L. Rosenkrans, who received 1,964 votes; Prohibitionist George McKerrow drew 129 votes. He was assigned to the standing committees on roads and bridges, and on ways and means. He died at his home in Pewaukee on July 6, 1893. (He was succeeded in the Assembly by Republican Caleb C. Harris.)

== Birds and nature ==
From an early age, Goss was an avid amateur naturalist, beginning at the age of 18 a correspondence with fellow enthusiasts (including Louis Agassiz and experts at the Smithsonian Institution) which lasted for many years. He was an avid birder and amateur ornithologist (as was his brother N. S. Goss); they traveled widely throughout the U.S., and gathered a collection that represented 720 species of birds. The collection (including what was described as "one of the most important private collections in the West") was donated mostly to the Milwaukee Public Museum, of which Goss was honorary curator of ornithology and zoology. At his death, he was called "one of the foremost ornithologists of this country".
