= Woodson County, Kansas =

County in Kansas, United States

- County
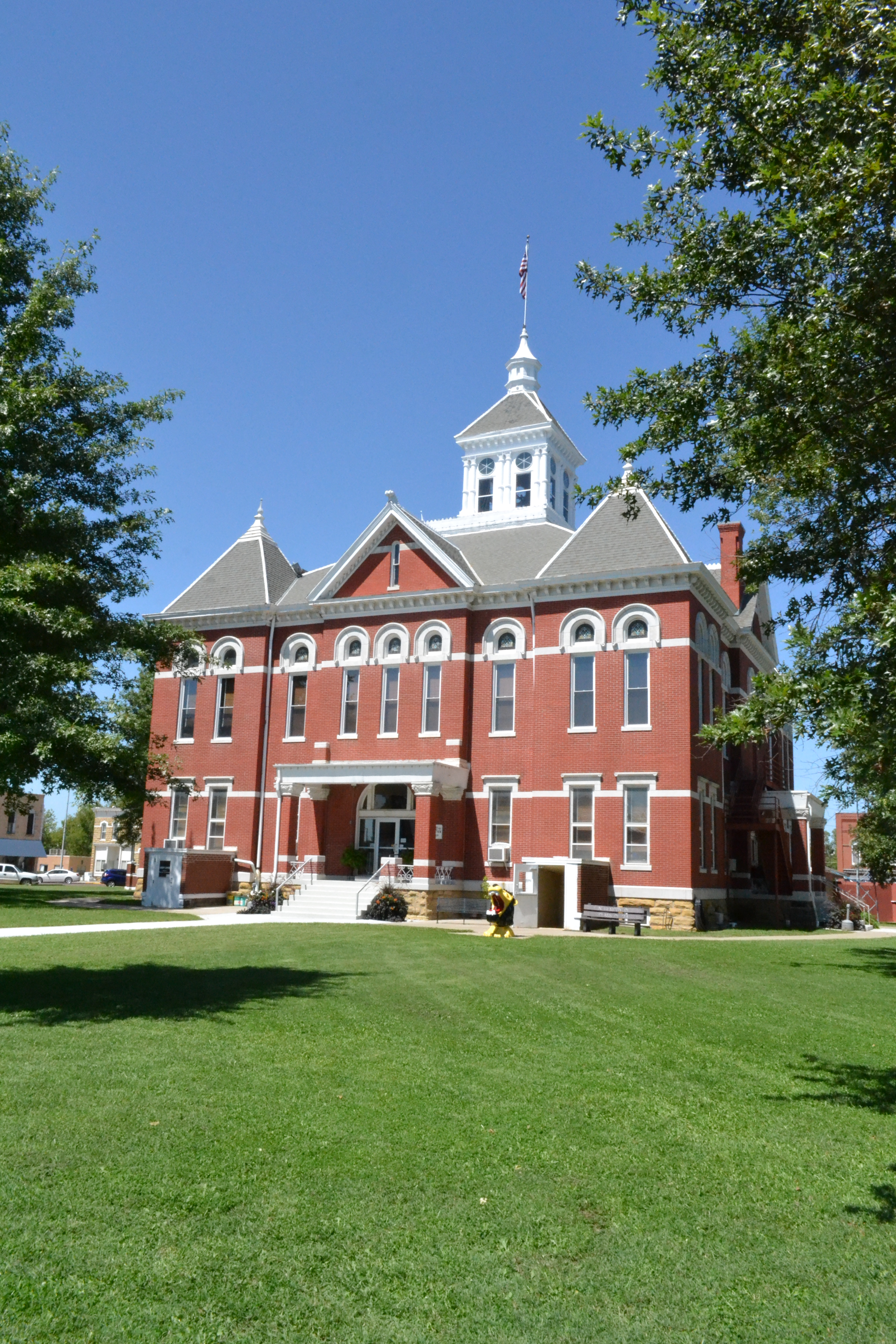
- Woodson County Courthouse in Yates Center

- Location within the U.S. state of Kansas
- Coordinates: 37°50′34″N 95°43′28″W
- Country: United States
- State: Kansas
- Founded: 1855
- Named for: Daniel Woodson
- Seat: Yates Center
- Largest city: Yates Center

Area
  - Total: 505 sq mi (1,310 km^{2})
  - Land: 498 sq mi (1,290 km^{2})
  - Water: 7.4 sq mi (19 km^{2}) 1.5%

Population (2020)
  - Total: 3,115
  - Estimate (2025): 3,118 ▲
  - Density: 6.3/sq mi (2.4/km^{2})
- Time zone: UTC−6 (Central)
  - Summer (DST): UTC−5 (CDT)
- Congressional district: 2nd
- Website: ks482.cichosting.com/main/

Woodson County is a county located in the U.S. state of Kansas. Its county seat is Yates Center. As of the 2020 census, the county population was 3,115. The county was named after Daniel Woodson, a five-time acting governor of the Kansas Territory.

== History ==
=== Early history ===
For many millennia, the Great Plains of North America was inhabited by nomadic Native Americans. From the 16th century to 18th century, the Kingdom of France claimed ownership of large parts of North America. In 1762, after the French and Indian War, France secretly ceded New France to Spain, per the Treaty of Fontainebleau.

=== 19th century ===
In 1802, Spain returned most of the land to France, but keeping title to about 7,500 square miles. In 1803, most of the land for modern day Kansas was acquired by the United States from France as part of the 828,000 square mile Louisiana Purchase for 2.83 cents per acre.

In 1854, the Kansas Territory was organized, then in 1861 Kansas became the 34th U.S. state. In 1855, Woodson County was established. Fort Belmont was used during the Civil War and had received refugees from the Trail of Blood on Ice. Opothleyahola is buried in an unmarked grave next to his daughter who died at the fort.

== Geography ==
According to the U.S. Census Bureau, the county has a total area of 505 square miles (1,310 km^{2}), of which 498 square miles (1,290 km^{2}) is land and 7.4 square miles (19 km^{2}) (1.5%) is water.

=== Adjacent counties ===
- Coffey County (north)
- Anderson County (northeast)
- Allen County (east)
- Neosho County (southeast)
- Wilson County (south)
- Greenwood County (west)

== Demographics ==
Historical population
Census	Pop.	Note	%±
1860	1,488		—
1870	3,827		157.2%
1880	6,535		70.8%
1890	9,021		38.0%
1900	10,022		11.1%
1910	9,450		−5.7%
1920	8,984		−4.9%
1930	8,526		−5.1%
1940	8,014		−6.0%
1950	6,711		−16.3%
1960	5,423		−19.2%
1970	4,789		−11.7%
1980	4,600		−3.9%
1990	4,116		−10.5%
2000	3,788		−8.0%
2010	3,309		−12.6%
2020	3,115		−5.9%
2025 (est.)	3,118	▲	0.1%
U.S. Decennial Census; 1790-1960 1900-1990; 1990-2000 2010-2020

=== 2020 census ===
As of the 2020 census, the county had a population of 3,115. The median age was 46.2 years. 21.3% of residents were under the age of 18 and 24.0% of residents were 65 years of age or older. For every 100 females there were 104.5 males, and for every 100 females age 18 and over there were 104.7 males age 18 and over.

The racial makeup of the county was 92.8% White, 0.3% Black or African American, 1.0% American Indian and Alaska Native, 0.0% Asian, 0.0% Native Hawaiian and Pacific Islander, 0.5% from some other race, and 5.5% from two or more races. Hispanic or Latino residents of any race comprised 2.3% of the population.

0.0% of residents lived in urban areas, while 100.0% lived in rural areas.

There were 1,355 households in the county, of which 26.1% had children under the age of 18 living with them and 21.1% had a female householder with no spouse or partner present. About 31.6% of all households were made up of individuals and 14.9% had someone living alone who was 65 years of age or older.

There were 1,828 housing units, of which 25.9% were vacant. Among occupied housing units, 79.3% were owner-occupied and 20.7% were renter-occupied. The homeowner vacancy rate was 2.2% and the rental vacancy rate was 16.8%.

=== 2000 census ===
As of the census of 2000, there were 3,788 people, 1,642 households, and 1,052 families residing in the county. The population density was 8 people per square mile (3.1 people/km^{2}). There were 2,076 housing units at an average density of 4 per square mile (1.5/km^{2}). The racial makeup of the county was 96.96% White, 0.82% Black or African American, 0.87% Native American, 0.05% Asian, 0.24% from other races, and 1.06% from two or more races. 1.37% of the population were Hispanic or Latino of any race.

There were 1,642 households, out of which 25.80% had children under the age of 18 living with them, 53.80% were married couples living together, 7.40% had a female householder with no husband present, and 35.90% were non-families. 33.30% of all households were made up of individuals, and 19.40% had someone living alone who was 65 years of age or older. The average household size was 2.24 and the average family size was 2.83.

In the county, the population was spread out, with 21.70% under the age of 18, 7.40% from 18 to 24, 22.10% from 25 to 44, 23.90% from 45 to 64, and 24.80% who were 65 years of age or older. The median age was 44 years. For every 100 females there were 96.80 males. For every 100 females age 18 and over, there were 96.80 males.

The median income for a household in the county was $25,335, and the median income for a family was $31,369. Males had a median income of $23,950 versus $16,135 for females. The per capita income for the county was $14,283. About 10.20% of families and 13.20% of the population were below the poverty line, including 17.20% of those under age 18 and 13.20% of those age 65 or over.

== Government ==
=== Presidential elections ===
Presidential election results

United States presidential election results for Woodson County, Kansas
Year	Republican		Democratic		Third party(ies)	
Year	No.	%	No.	%	No.	%
1888	1,149	51.97%	595	26.91%	467	21.12%
1892	1,071	50.16%	0	0.00%	1,064	49.84%
1896	1,288	51.56%	1,189	47.60%	21	0.84%
1900	1,418	55.54%	1,115	43.67%	20	0.78%
1904	1,490	63.57%	657	28.03%	197	8.40%
1908	1,252	53.23%	1,047	44.52%	53	2.25%
1912	694	29.14%	900	37.78%	788	33.08%
1916	1,861	48.21%	1,794	46.48%	205	5.31%
1920	2,253	68.71%	944	28.79%	82	2.50%
1924	2,412	63.17%	1,026	26.87%	380	9.95%
1928	2,885	76.59%	855	22.70%	27	0.72%
1932	1,842	45.17%	2,119	51.96%	117	2.87%
1936	2,374	55.49%	1,884	44.04%	20	0.47%
1940	2,637	64.87%	1,398	34.39%	30	0.74%
1944	2,308	69.56%	999	30.11%	11	0.33%
1948	1,997	62.58%	1,145	35.88%	49	1.54%
1952	2,594	76.29%	786	23.12%	20	0.59%
1956	2,171	70.88%	870	28.40%	22	0.72%
1960	1,853	67.36%	888	32.28%	10	0.36%
1964	1,279	52.61%	1,128	46.40%	24	0.99%
1968	1,450	62.63%	639	27.60%	226	9.76%
1972	1,592	72.59%	550	25.08%	51	2.33%
1976	1,104	54.09%	904	44.29%	33	1.62%
1980	1,435	65.56%	646	29.51%	108	4.93%
1984	1,408	69.36%	596	29.36%	26	1.28%
1988	1,062	57.50%	761	41.20%	24	1.30%
1992	662	35.48%	590	31.62%	614	32.90%
1996	953	52.02%	598	32.64%	281	15.34%
2000	974	61.07%	521	32.66%	100	6.27%
2004	1,204	68.29%	530	30.06%	29	1.64%
2008	1,055	65.98%	512	32.02%	32	2.00%
2012	1,035	71.53%	380	26.26%	32	2.21%
2016	1,082	74.98%	273	18.92%	88	6.10%
2020	1,228	79.43%	294	19.02%	24	1.55%
2024	1,205	80.01%	282	18.73%	19	1.26%

In presidential elections, as is the case with other rural areas of Kansas, Woodson County votes predominantly Republican. The only Democrat to win a majority in the county was Franklin D. Roosevelt in 1932, although Woodrow Wilson won a plurality in 1912. In contrast, Charles Evans Hughes in 1916 and George H. W. Bush in 1992 are the only Republican winners of the county who only managed to win a plurality of its votes.

== Education ==
=== Unified school districts ===
School districts with territory in the county include:

- Woodson USD 366 - Offices in the county
- Altoona–Midway USD 387
- Eureka USD 389
- Fredonia USD 484
- Humboldt USD 258
- Leroy-Gridley USD 245
- Madison-Virgil USD 386

== Communities ==
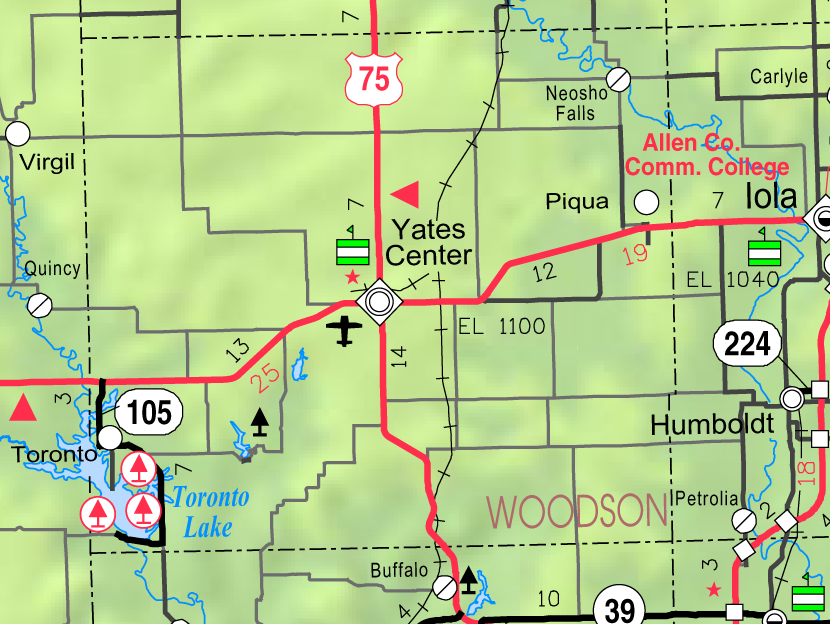
2005 map of Woodson County (map legend)

List of townships / incorporated cities / unincorporated communities / extinct former communities within Woodson County.

=== Cities ===
- Yates Center (county seat)
- Toronto
- Neosho Falls

=== Unincorporated communities ===
† means a community is designated a Census-Designated Place (CDP) by the United States Census Bureau.

- Cookville
- Durand
- Piqua†
- Vernon

=== Ghost towns ===
- Defiance - located six miles east of Yates Center, its population moved to Yates Center after it was selected as the permanent county seat in 1876
- Kalida - located two miles south of Yates Center, its population moved to Yates Center after it was selected as the permanent county seat in 1876

=== Townships ===
Woodson County is divided into six townships. The city of Yates Center is considered governmentally independent and is excluded from the census figures for the townships. In the following table, the population center is the largest city (or cities) included in that township's population total, if it is of a significant size.

Sources: 2000 U.S. Gazetteer from the U.S. Census Bureau.
Township	FIPS	Population center	Population	Population density /km^{2} (/sq mi)	Land area km^{2} (sq mi)	Water area km^{2} (sq mi)	Water %	Geographic coordinates
Center	12250		594	1 (4)	410 (158)	1 (0)	0.23%	37°50′35″N 95°43′29″W
Liberty	40375		200	1 (2)	223 (86)	1 (0)	0.26%	37°59′18″N 95°43′47″W
Neosho Falls	49850		537	3 (7)	196 (76)	1 (0)	0.38%	37°57′30″N 95°33′54″W
North	51025		71	0 (1)	167 (64)	0 (0)	0.11%	37°59′50″N 95°53′19″W
Perry	55475		103	1 (2)	127 (49)	0 (0)	0.08%	37°46′18″N 95°35′24″W
Toronto	71075		684	4 (11)	167 (64)	10 (4)	5.40%	37°47′52″N 95°55′37″W

== See also ==
- National Register of Historic Places listings in Woodson County, Kansas
