= Sister Coletta =

Sister Mary Coletta Massoth
- Born: Florence Johanna Massoth; May 25, 1919; Piqua, Kansas, U.S.
- Died: January 13, 1983 (aged 63)
- Resting place: Oklahoma City
- Known for: Contributions to healthcare in Oklahoma

Sister Coletta (May 25, 1919 – January 13, 1983) was an American religious sister known for her contributions to healthcare in Oklahoma.

== Biography ==
Florence Johanna Massoth was born on May 25, 1919, in Piqua, Kansas, to William Joseph Massoth and Christina Kipp. She and her three siblings were raised Catholic and her sister Loretta became Sister Mary Leonilla of the Sisters of Mercy while her brother became a Benedictine Order priest. Massoth joined the Sisters of Mercy when she was 20 and adopted the name Sister Mary Coletta Massoth. She then graduated from St. John's Hospital School of Nursing in 1950, earned a bachelor's degree from Incarnate Word College, and attended the Catholic University of America for her master's degree studies in 1955.

Sister Coletta started her career at Mercy Hospital in Oklahoma City and quickly was promoted to the director of its nursing school. After returning from her master's degree studies, she was promoted to the director of nursing services. In 1962, she moved to the St. Edward's School of Nursing in Fort Smith, Arkansas. In 1966, she returned to Oklahoma to oversee construction of a new Mercy Health Center and she administered the new center from its opening in June 1974 until 1978. She died on January 13, 1983, and is buried in Oklahoma City.

The Coletta Building in Oklahoma City is named in her honor.
