= Cookville, Kansas =

Unincorporated community in Woodson County, Kansas, United States

Coordinates: 37°49′13″N 95°35′32″W

Cookville is an unincorporated community in Woodson County, Kansas, United States.

== History ==
A post office was opened in Cookville in 1879, and remained in operation until it was discontinued in 1904.

== Education ==
The community is served by Woodson USD 366 public school district.
