= Piqua, Kansas =

Unincorporated community in Woodson County, Kansas, United States

- CDP
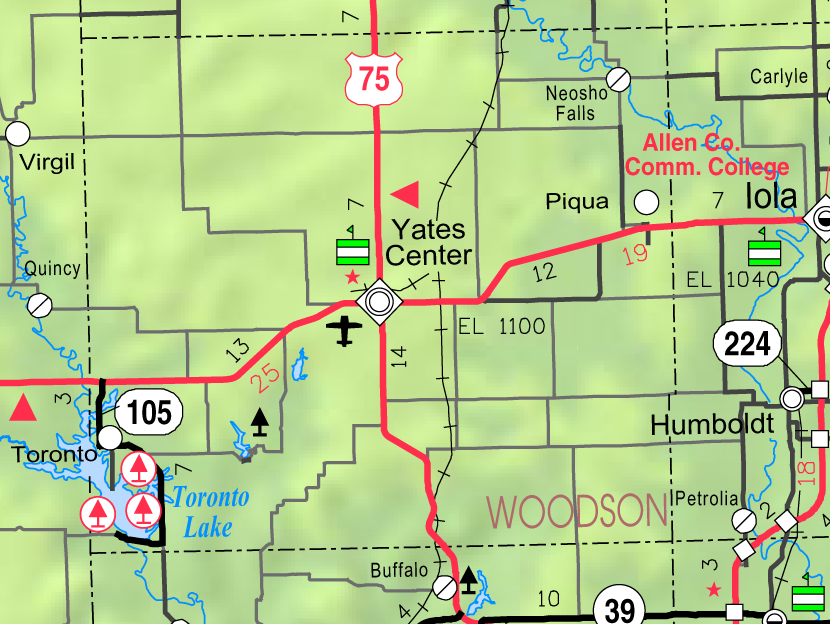
- KDOT map of Woodson County (legend)

- Location within Kansas Location within the United States
- Coordinates: 37°55′19″N 95°32′15″W
- Country: United States
- State: Kansas
- County: Woodson
- Founded: 1882
- Named for: Piqua, Ohio

Area
  - Total: 4.007 sq mi (10.38 km^{2})
  - Land: 3.968 sq mi (10.28 km^{2})
  - Water: 0.039 sq mi (0.10 km^{2})
- Elevation: 1,034 ft (315 m)

Population (2020)
  - Total: 90
  - Density: 23/sq mi (8.8/km^{2})
- Time zone: UTC-6 (CST)
  - Summer (DST): UTC-5 (CDT)
- Area code: 620
- FIPS code: 20-56000
- GNIS ID: 2629168

Piqua is a census-designated place (CDP) in Woodson County, Kansas, United States. As of the 2020 census, the population was 90.

== History ==
Piqua had its start in the year 1882 by the building of the railroads through the territory, and is situated at the junction of the Missouri Pacific Railroad and the Missouri-Kansas-Texas Railroad. It was named after the city of Piqua, Ohio. The first post office in Piqua was established in March 1882.

== Geography ==
Piqua is located on U.S. Route 54 and is east of U.S. Route 75. Piqua is located between the cities of Yates Center and Iola.

== Demographics ==
Historical population
Census	Pop.	Note	%±
2010	107		—
2020	90		−15.9%
U.S. Decennial Census

The 2020 United States census counted 90 people, 41 households, and 19 families in Piqua. The population density was 22.7 per square mile (8.8/km^{2}). There were 43 housing units at an average density of 10.8 per square mile (4.2/km^{2}). The racial makeup was 91.11% (82) white or European American (90.0% non-Hispanic white), 0.0% (0) black or African-American, 0.0% (0) Native American or Alaska Native, 0.0% (0) Asian, 0.0% (0) Pacific Islander or Native Hawaiian, 0.0% (0) from other races, and 8.89% (8) from two or more races. Hispanic or Latino of any race was 5.56% (5) of the population.

Of the 41 households, 14.6% had children under the age of 18; 31.7% were married couples living together; 34.1% had a female householder with no spouse or partner present. 46.3% of households consisted of individuals and 24.4% had someone living alone who was 65 years of age or older. The average household size was 4.5 and the average family size was 4.5. The percent of those with a bachelor's degree or higher was estimated to be 15.6% of the population.

21.1% of the population was under the age of 18, 4.4% from 18 to 24, 17.8% from 25 to 44, 24.4% from 45 to 64, and 32.2% who were 65 years of age or older. The median age was 53.0 years. For every 100 females, there were 95.7 males. For every 100 females ages 18 and older, there were 97.2 males.

== Education ==
The community is served by Woodson USD 366 public school district.

== Notable people ==
- Buster Keaton (1895–1966), acclaimed actor and film director. He was born in Piqua while his mother was traveling.
- Fred Kipp, Major league baseball pitcher between 1957 and 1960 with the Dodgers and Yankees.
