= Durand, Kansas =

Unincorporated community in Woodson County, Kansas, United States

- Unincorporated community
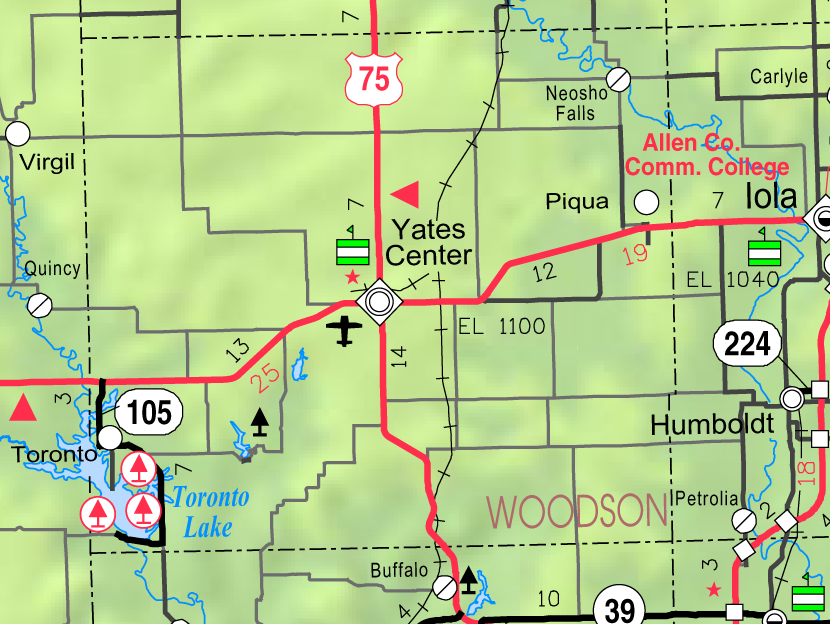
- KDOT map of Woodson County (legend)

- Location within Kansas Location within the United States
- Coordinates: 37°53′23″N 95°41′35″W
- Country: United States
- State: Kansas
- County: Woodson
- Elevation: 994 ft (303 m)
- Time zone: UTC-6 (CST)
  - Summer (DST): UTC-5 (CDT)
- Area code: 620
- FIPS code: 20-19025
- GNIS ID: 484687

Durand is an unincorporated community in Woodson County, Kansas, United States.

== Education ==
The community is served by Woodson USD 366 public school district.
