= Fred Kipp =

American baseball player (born 1931)

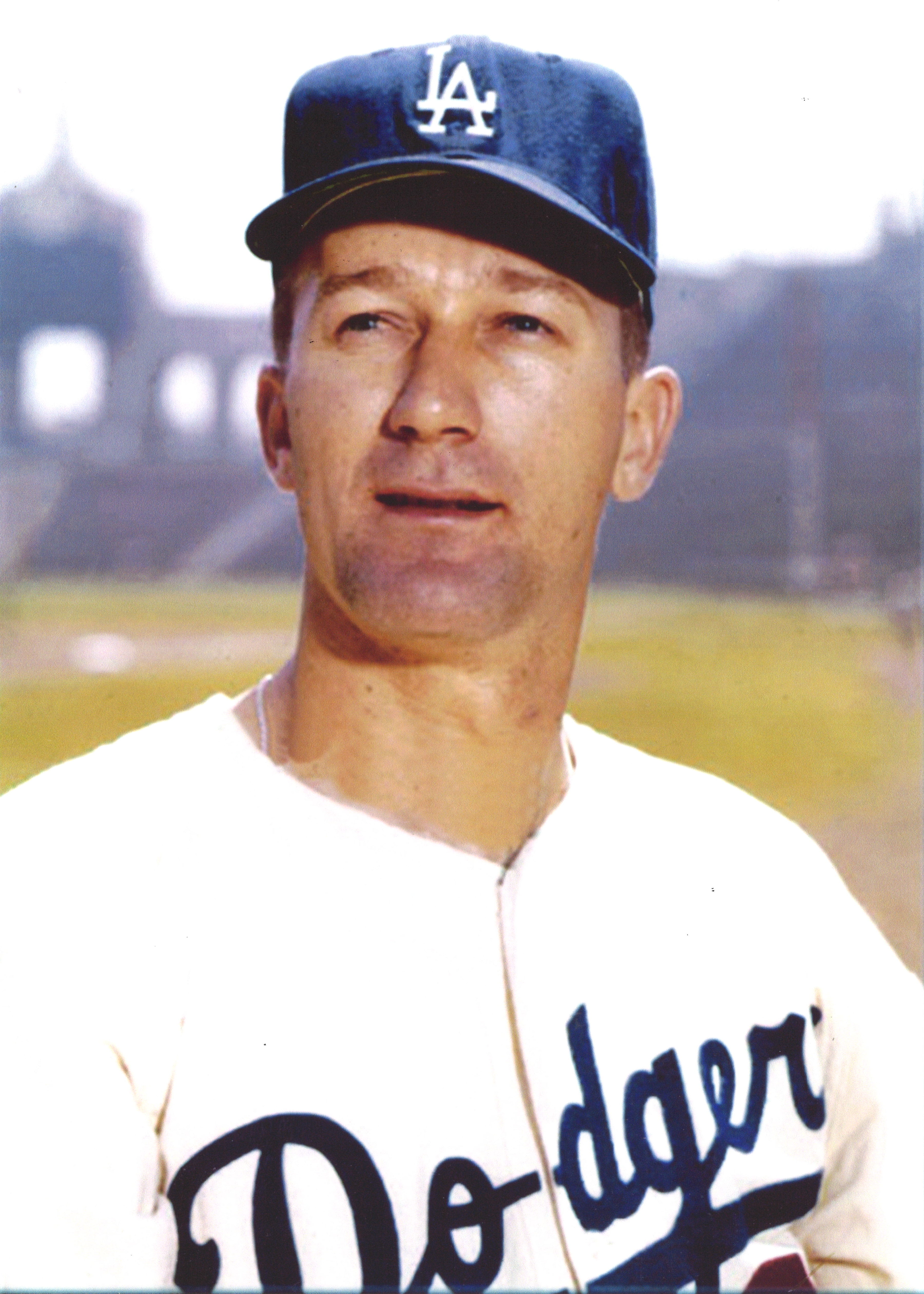
- Kipp in 1958
- Pitcher
- Born: October 1, 1931 (age 93); Piqua, Kansas, U.S.
- Batted: Left Threw: Left

MLB debut
- September 10, 1957, for the Brooklyn Dodgers

Last MLB appearance
- May 8, 1960, for the New York Yankees

MLB statistics
- Win–loss record: 6–7
- Earned run average: 5.08
- Strikeouts: 64
- Stats at Baseball Reference

Teams
- Brooklyn / Los Angeles Dodgers (1957–1959); New York Yankees (1960)

Fred Leo Kipp (born October 1, 1931) played professional baseball for the Brooklyn / Los Angeles Dodgers and New York Yankees. He is the last living player to play for both the Brooklyn Dodgers and the New York Yankees.

== Overview ==
Kipp played semi-pro and professional baseball from 1950 to 1964 and signed on with the Brooklyn Dodgers in 1953. That year, he pitched for the Ashville Tourists in the Tri-State League and lead the league with a 2.24 ERA. After military service from 1953 to 1955, he pitched for the Goodland Tigers and the Mobile Bears. He pitched exhibition games for the Dodgers during spring training in 1956 and spent the season with the Montreal Royals where he won Rookie of the Year with a 20 win season and was an All-Star. He joined the Dodgers on September 1 for the pennant race. He pitched batting practice in the 1956 World Series and joined the Boys of Summer on the 1956 Dodger Goodwill Tour of Japan.

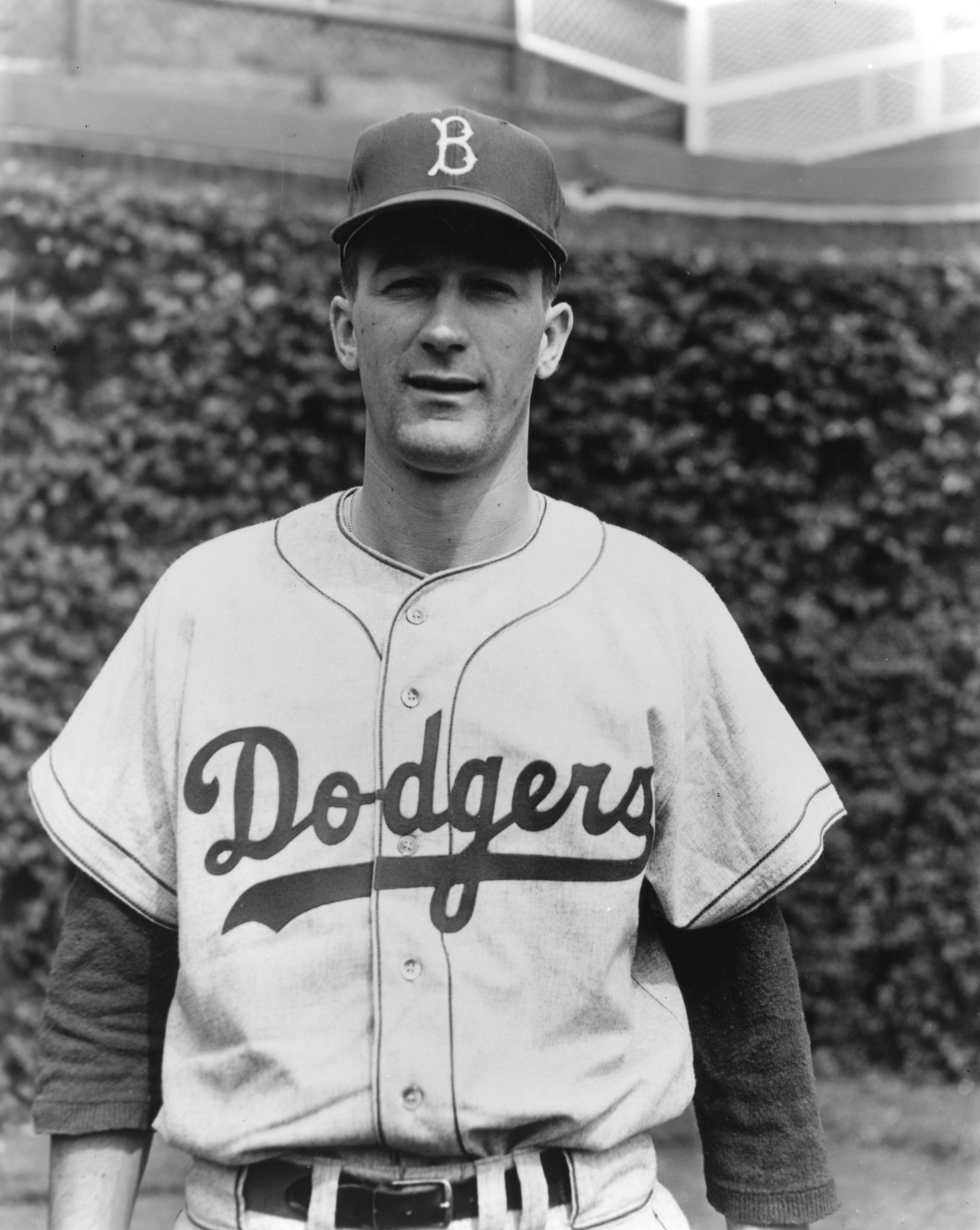
Fred Kipp in 1957 with the Brooklyn Dodgers

In 1957, Kipp pitched his first game with the Bums against the Chicago Cubs at Wrigley Field on September 10. After playing winter ball for the Escogido Leones in the Dominican Republic over the 1957-1958 winter, he pitched for the new Los Angeles Dodgers for the whole season of 1958. He pitched in 40 games as a starter and reliever and ended the season with a 6–6 record. He faced 443 batters that year and struck out 58.

In 1959, he pitched for the St. Paul Saints and threw 5 shutouts and made the All-Star team. He pitched two games for the Dodgers during the pennant race at the end of the season. In 1960, he was traded to the New York Yankees and pitched four games before he was sent to the Richmond Virginians. Kipp was the ace reliever for the Virginians and pitched in 150 games over the next three years. He retired from professional baseball in 1962 to raise a family of six.

=== Early years ===
Fred was born in the small, 100-person town of Piqua, Kansas on October 1, 1931. Piqua is famous for being the birthplace of Buster Keaton. Kipp was the third child of Chuck and Ida Kipp and has an older brother Tom and an older sister Donna. He played baseball in the summer and basketball in the winter. He was a standout athlete and became the star of the Iola High basketball team. After World War II ended, the Piqua town baseball team resumed playing and Fred was 14 when he started pitching for the Piqua town against other local farming towns. He struck out men twice his age and got known for his knuckleball. When he was 18, Kipp hitchhiked to a New York Giants tryout in Cassville, Missouri. He was offered a position but decided to go to college instead.

=== College 1949-1953 ===
The famous basketball coach Tex Winters recruited Fred to Kansas State University with a basketball scholarship. He transferred to Kansas State Teachers College (Emporia) after one semester so that he could play basketball and baseball. He threw a no-hitter his Freshman year at Washburn University and then started playing on the Emporia Rangers town team in the summer of 1950. Besides playing better teams from Ft. Riley, Wichita and Topeka, he played the barnstorming Kansas City Monarchs. In the summers of 1951 and 1952, he played for the Chamberlain Chiefs in South Dakota and the Superior Knights in Nebraska.

=== 1953 – Minor Leagues ===
With an invitation to try out for the Dodgers, Kipp took a 40-hour train ride to Vero Beach, Florida over Easter break from college in 1953. He went to spring training as a free agent and joined the Dodger organization. After graduating from Emporia, he started pitching for the Miami Sunsox in the Florida International League. He pitched poorly in Miami and didn't last a month before he was transferred to the Asheville Tourists in North Carolina. Once in the cool mountain air, he got hot. Fred found his groove and lead the league with a 2.24 ERA and earned a 15–5 record. The season went well but he got drafted into the army at the end of the season.

=== 1953-55 – The Army ===
The Korean War was winding down when Fred entered basic training at Camp Rucker in Alabama. Many baseball players were drafted into the military at which generals would handpick the players for their divisional teams. Fred began pitching for the 136th Bearcats and won 10 straight games. Fred pitched against the St. Louis Cardinal “Vinegar Bend” Mizell – whom he would later play against in the majors – and many other major leaguers.

=== 1955 – Kearney, Goodland and Mobile ===
After getting out of the military to go to graduate school at the University of Northern Colorado at Greeley, Kipp was quickly back pitching for the Kearney Irishmen in the Nebraska International League. When Billy Martin of New York Yankee fame heard that Fred was pitching in the Great Plains, he found Fred and convinced him to play for the Goodland Tigers. Billy was in military duty in Ft. Carson and managed the Goodland team. Fred pitched well and lead the Tigers to some victories before Clay Bryant, the coach of the Mobile Bears, recruited Fred to the Southern Association. Fred ended up playing on three teams that summer and worked his way up to better teams.

The Mobile Bears were a AA farm team for the Dodgers and Kipp started playing with 7 weeks left in the season. He ended the season with a 4–2 record and lead the team into the playoffs. He beat the Birmingham Barons twice in the playoffs to win the league playoffs and earn the right to play in the Dixie Series against the winners of the Texas League. The Bears faced the Shreveport Sports in the Dixie Series and beat them in four straight games.

After the winning season, Clay Bryant convinced Fred to play winter ball in Caracas, Venezuela. The opportunity to make $1,000/month was a big pay raise, so he went but things didn't go well in Venezuela and he soon returned to the States after just one month.

== 1956 – Montreal and Brooklyn ==
Spring training at Dodgertown went so well for Fred that he soon started pitching exhibition games with the World Champion Brooklyn Dodgers. Competition was obviously much harder in the big leagues and he faced many greats that spring from Ted Williams to Mickey Mantle. Behind Fred were the Boys of Summer – Jackie Robinson, Pee Wee Reese, Gil Hodges, Duke Snider and all the rest. He was throwing to Roy Campanella and relieving the greats like Carl Erskine.

Kipp didn't make the final cut and went to the AAA Montreal Royals for the season. The Royals and St. Paul Saints were the two top Dodger farm teams and Kipp lead the pitching staff of the Royals that year with a 20-7 record. He pitched 254 innings and got 127 strikeouts and won Rookie of the Year in the International League. Other greats in the league that year were Satchel Paige, Lynn Lovenguth, Billy Shantz, Norm Sherry, and Eddie Lopat.

Kipp joined the Dodgers on September 1 when the rosters opened up. The Dodgers were in a three-way pennant race with the Milwaukee Braves and Cincinnati Redlegs. While not getting on the field, Kipp watched the games from the dugout and the bull pen. The Dodgers prevailed in the Pennant race but Kipp was ineligible for the World Series against their nemesis – the New York Yankees. Kipp pitched batting practice for the Dodgers and saw Don Larsen's perfect game. The Dodgers lost game 7 at Ebbets Field and this would be the last World Series for the Bums who would move to Los Angeles in 1958.

=== 1956 – Dodgers Goodwill Tour of Japan ===
The day after losing game 7 of the 1956 World Series, the team started their journey to Japan where they would play 19 games. 51 players, coaches, wives and friends of the Dodgers got on the plane that day and ended up flying 9,254 miles in 29 hours. With stops in LA, Maui, Honolulu, and Wake Island, they arrived in Tokyo with much fanfare. The Dodgers played many All Star Japanese teams and professional teams from Sapporo to Hiroshima.

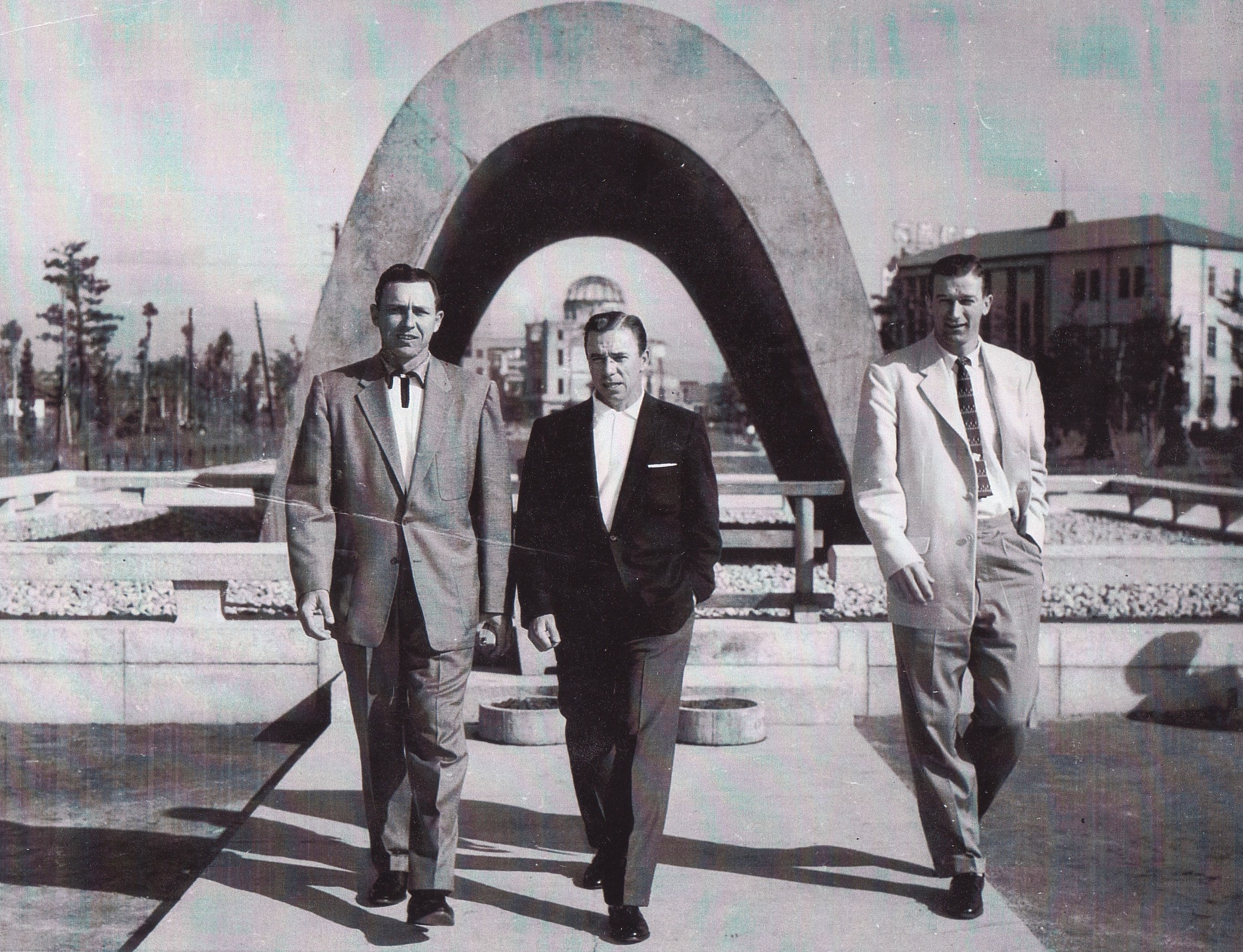
Fred Kipp, Gil Hodges and Pee Wee Reese Tour Hiroshima, Japan.

While Kipp hadn't even pitched a regular season game for the Dodgers yet, he pitched more than any other pitcher on the Japan tour. Kipp brought a pitch to Japan that they had not seen before – his knuckle ball. The Japanese third baseman Atsushi Hadoka said, “Kipp is a hard pitcher to get to. I couldn’t hit any of his inside balls. They cut the corner sharp. They were puzzlers and I still don’t know if they were a knuckleball or a palm ball.” Japanese players called Kipp a “knuckleball artist”. Kipp ended up pitching complete games and struck out 26 batters in 43 innings.

=== 1957 – Montreal and a Cup of Coffee ===
Spring training went well for Kipp in Vero Beach and he again pitched some exhibition games against the Yankees where he faced Mickey Mantle in a rematch of the 1956 World Series. Kipp stayed with the team through the first couple weeks of the season, but was sent back to Montreal on April 27 before he made it to the mound. In Montreal, his sophomore year ended with an 8–17 record with 10 complete games and 99 strikeouts.

Throughout the season, there were rumors that he would be called up to the Dodgers, but he didn't get called up until the Dodgers could expand their roster in September. Kipp got his cup of coffee on September 10 at Wrigley Field against the Chicago Cubs. He pitched 4 innings in his debut, but gave up 6 hits and 4 runs. He stayed with the Brooklyn Dodgers until the very end and was at the final game at Ebbets Field on September 24, 1957.

=== 1957-1960 – Winter Leagues in the Dominican Republic ===
After the 1957 season, Kipp decided to play winter ball in the Dominican Republic. He played for the Escogido Lions (Leones del Escogido) in the capital that was named Ciudad Trujillo at the time – later renamed Santo Domingo. Kipp became their pitching ace and was the first in the league to win 10 games in the 1957–58 season. He helped the Lions win the championship in the 1957–58 and 1959–60 seasons.

Kipp pitched alongside the young Juan Marichal and the Alou brothers. Kipp played with Juan before he pitched in the minor leagues and saw him grow into the dominant pitcher who won more games in the 1960s than any other player. He also saw the Alou brothers grow from teenagers to stars in the Majors. Ozzie Virgil, the first Dominican to reach the majors, was on the team with Kipp as well. These Dominican players were trailblazers that inspired generations of Dominican players who make up over 10% of the major league baseball players in 2016.

The Dominican teams were a mixture of expatriates and local talent. The Lions had many American players who were mainly from the Brooklyn/Los Angeles Dodgers and the New York/San Francisco Giants. From the Dodgers, Kipp's teammates were Norm Sherry, Ron Negray, Frank Howard, Stan Williams and Rudy Hernandez. From the Giants organization, he played with Willie McCovey, Willie Kirkland, and Bill White.

== 1958 – Full Time Dodger ==
Kipp became a regular pitcher for the Dodgers in their first year in Los Angeles. Pitching in the Los Angeles Coliseum was a challenge for left handers like Kipp because of the short, left field that was only 251’ down the foul line. Kipp got his first start on Friday April 25 in front of a record setting 60,000 fans who came out to see Stan “The Man” Musial in his first appearance in Los Angeles. In Kipp's first at bat, he nearly hit a home run off the China Wall – the 42’ tall screen that was erected to stop home runs in left field. Kipp struck out 5 batters and allowed three runs into the 8th inning. Kipp got his first win despite Musial hitting 4 for 4 that night. Musial was thrown out at home twice and that could have made the difference in the game since the Dodgers won 5–3.

Kipp pitched in 40 games that year and pitched 102 innings. He started 9 games and relieved in 31 others and ended up with a 6–6 record while the Dodgers were 71-83 – their first losing season since 1944. His wins were a mixture of threes. Three wins at night and three wins during the day. Three wins at home and three wins away. One of the wins came after Kipp only threw a single pitch. Against their arch rival Giants on Labor Day, Kipp pitched all the way to the bottom of the 9th inning with two outs and faced one last batter. On the 140th pitch, Giants catcher Bob Schmidt hit a home run to tie the game and send it into extra innings. Kipp won the Silver Slugger award for being the pitcher with the best batting average of .250 that year.

=== 1959 – St. Paul Saints and Dodger Pennant Race ===
Kipp spent the 1959 season with the St. Paul Saints in the new American Association that consisted of 10 teams. Kipp was the workhorse in the rotation and started 30 games and pitched 213 innings. He struck out 125 batters and won a spot on the All Star team. He went 14-11 and was called up to the Dodgers on September 6 when the Dodgers were in a three-way pennant race with the Giants and Braves. Kipp pitched in two games during the pennant race and helped the Dodgers into a three-game playoff against the Braves. The Dodgers won the playoff and the World Series against the Chicago White Sox.

== 1960 – New York Yankees and Richmond Virginians ==
During Spring Training, Kipp asked to be traded instead of going down to St. Paul. Kipp was traded to the Yankees for outfielders Gordon Windhorn and Dick Sanders. Kipp traded his Dodger Blue uniform in for pinstripes and joined the Dodger's long-time nemesis in the World Series. The Yankees were the powerhouse team that had been to the World Series in 10 of the previous 12 years and won 8 of them. Kipp joined Mickey Mantle, Yogi Bera, Whitey Ford, Ralph Terry and many other stars. Roger Maris joined the team with Kipp that year and was MVP of the league in his first year with the Yankees. Kipp pitched four games for the Yankees before he was sent to the Richmond Virginians farm team.

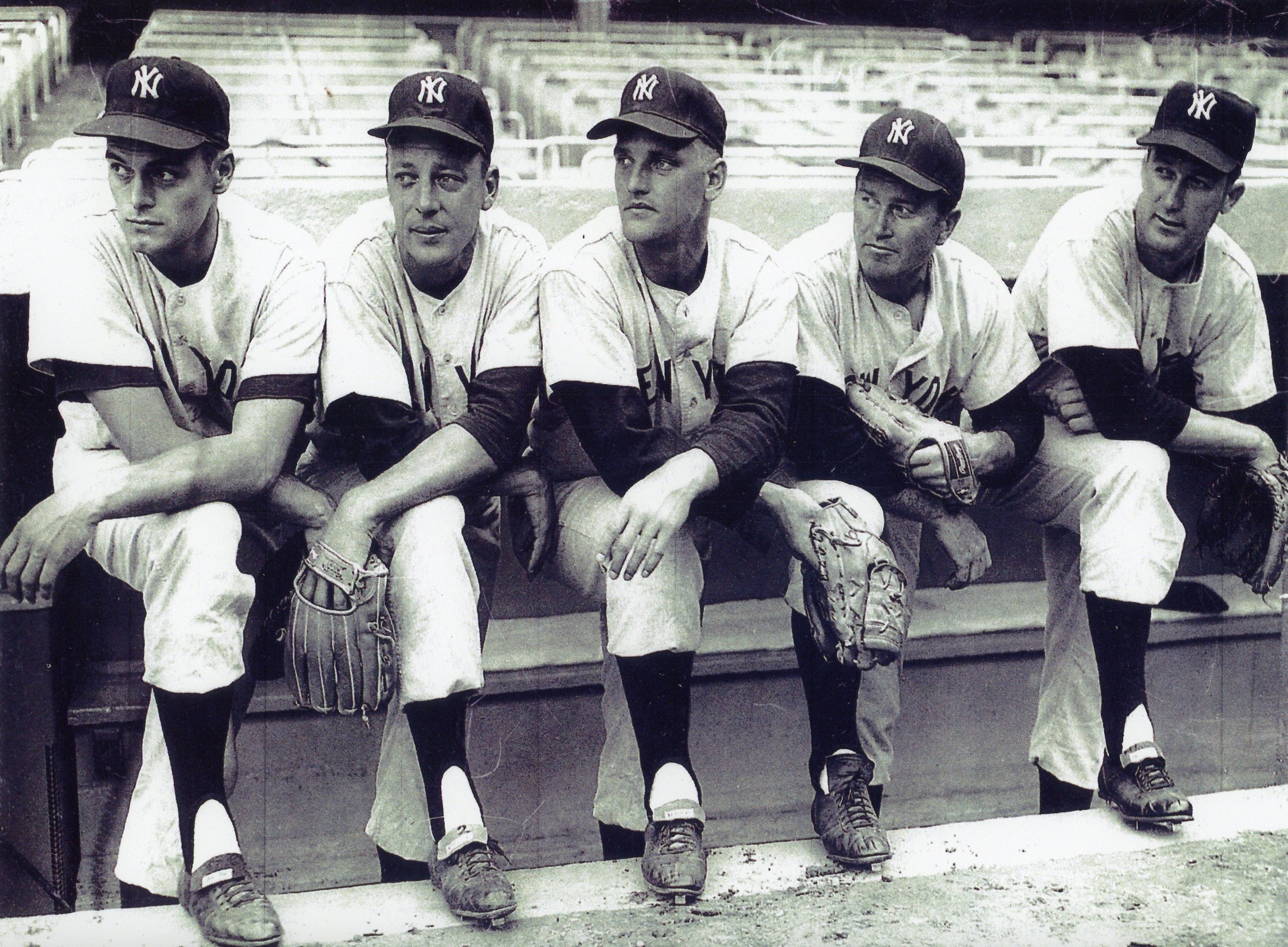
This picture shows the new players for the New York Yankees in 1960.

The Virginians were in the International League and Kipp was soon playing against the Montreal Royals and the Havana Sugar Kings. In 1959, Fidel Castro had overthrown the Cuban government and many soldiers went to the game. Kipp reported that teenagers patrolled the streets with AK47s and shotguns at the baseball games when the Sugar Kings made a good play. When a Rochester Red Wings player Frank Verdi, standing in as the third base coach, was struck in the head with a stray bullet that year, the International League decided to move the Havana Sugar Kings to the US where they became the Jersey City Jerseys.

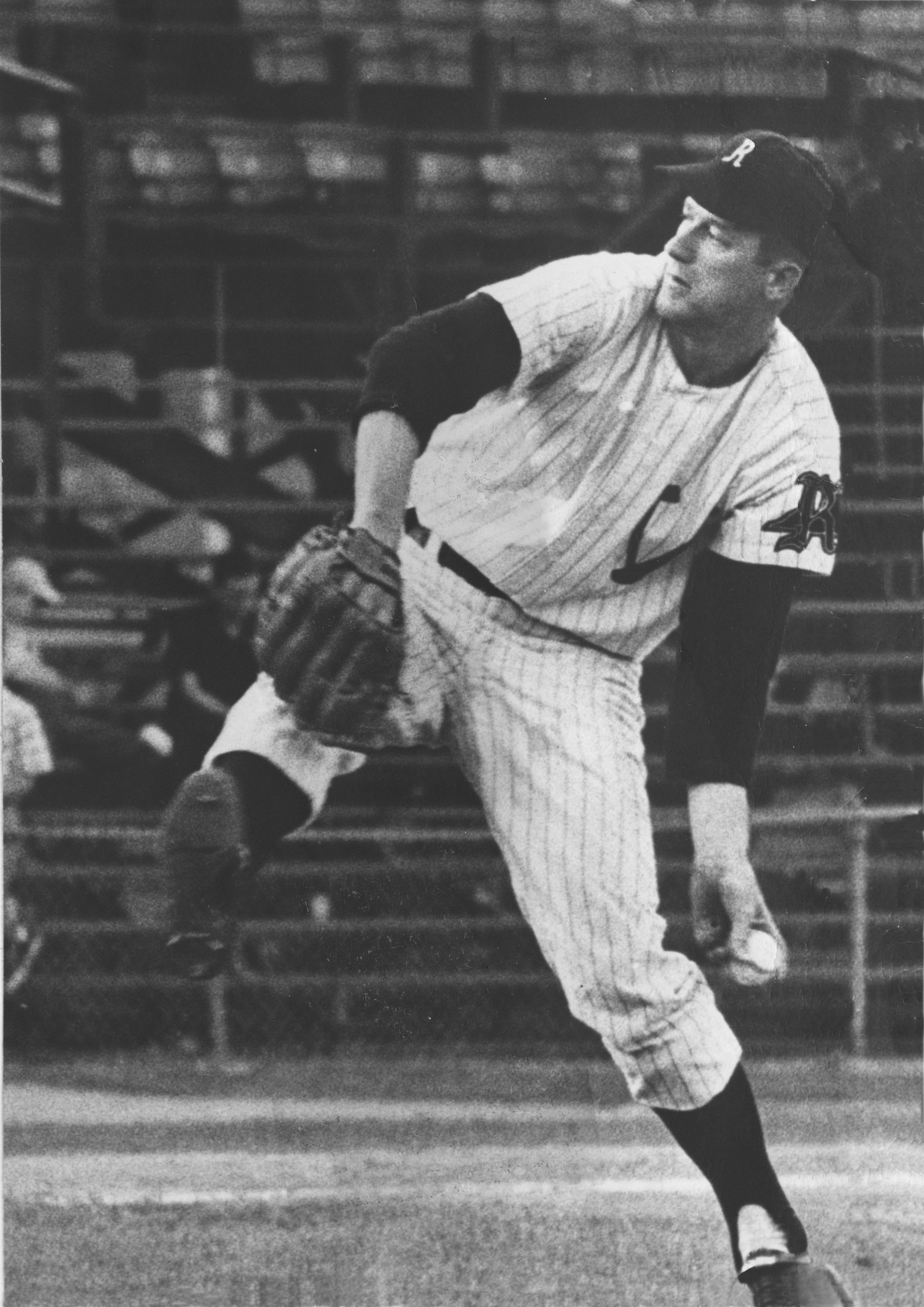
Fred Kipp pitching in Richmond.

Kipp became the relieving ace in Richmond and pitched in 47 games in 1960, 50 games in 1961 and 53 games in 1962. He started 17 games in 1961, but was a full-time reliever the other two years. In the winter of 1960-1961, he stayed in Kansas City and became engaged to Susan Kokoruda after a few months of dating. They married in the fall of 1961 and honeymooned in Puerto Rico where Kipp played winter ball for the Ponce Leones. Kipp turned 30 and only stayed a month in the Puerto Rican winter leagues before returning to Kansas City. During the 1962 season, his first son Chris was born and the writing was on the wall. Making a living in the minor leagues and raising a family were not compatible. With little chance of getting back to the Major Leagues, Kipp retired from professional baseball at the end of the 1962 season.
