= Vernon, Kansas =

Unincorporated community in Woodson County, Kansas, United States

Coordinates: 37°58′50″N 95°39′25″W

Vernon is an unincorporated community in Woodson County, Kansas, United States.

== History ==
A post office was opened in Vernon in 1887, and remained in operation until it was discontinued in 1953.

== Education ==
The community is served by Woodson USD 366 public school district.
