= Neosho Falls, Kansas =

City in Woodson County, Kansas, United States

- City
- Location within Woodson County and Kansas

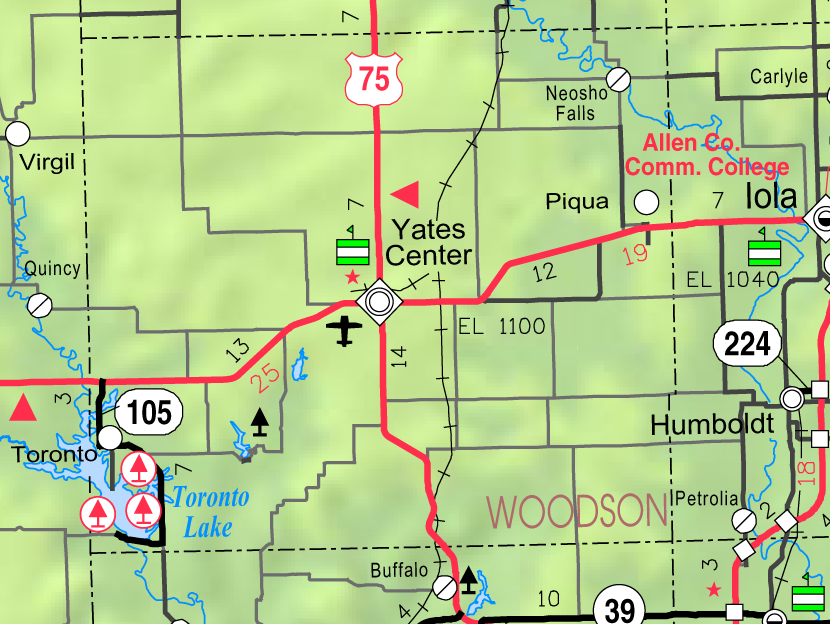
- KDOT map of Woodson County (legend)
- Coordinates: 38°0′21″N 95°33′20″W
- Country: United States
- State: Kansas
- County: Woodson
- Founded: 1857
- Incorporated: 1892
- Named for: Falls on Neosho River

Area
  - Total: 0.53 sq mi (1.38 km^{2})
  - Land: 0.51 sq mi (1.31 km^{2})
  - Water: 0.023 sq mi (0.06 km^{2})
- Elevation: 971 ft (296 m)

Population (2020)
  - Total: 134
  - Density: 265/sq mi (102/km^{2})
- Time zone: UTC-6 (CST)
  - Summer (DST): UTC-5 (CDT)
- ZIP Code: 66758
- Area code: 620
- FIPS code: 20-49825
- GNIS ID: 2395173

Neosho Falls is a city in Woodson County, Kansas, United States. As of the 2020 census, the population of the city was 134.

== History ==
Neosho Falls was founded in 1857, making it the oldest town and first county seat in Woodson County. It was named from the Neosho River, on which it is situated. The first post office in Neosho Falls was established in May 1857.

Neosho Falls was originally platted and extensively improved by a company led by Benjamin F. Goss and his brother N. S. Goss, who would later organize a company of cavalry in the area to fight for the Union in the Civil War.

The town was largely destroyed and abandoned when the Neosho River overflowed during the Great Flood of 1951.

== Geography ==
According to the United States Census Bureau, the city has a total area of 0.57 square miles (1.48 km^{2}), of which 0.54 square miles (1.40 km^{2}) is land and 0.03 square miles (0.08 km^{2}) is water.

== Demographics ==
Historical population
Census	Pop.	Note	%±
1870	532		—
1880	552		3.8%
1890	606		9.8%
1900	763		25.9%
1910	571		−25.2%
1920	628		10.0%
1930	462		−26.4%
1940	452		−2.2%
1950	355		−21.5%
1960	222		−37.5%
1970	184		−17.1%
1980	157		−14.7%
1990	157		0.0%
2000	179		14.0%
2010	141		−21.2%
2020	134		−5.0%
U.S. Decennial Census

=== 2020 census ===
The 2020 United States census counted 134 people, 57 households, and 34 families in Neosho Falls. The population density was 264.3 per square mile (102.0/km^{2}). There were 74 housing units at an average density of 146.0 per square mile (56.4/km^{2}). The racial makeup was 89.55% (120) white or European American (88.06% non-Hispanic white), 0.0% (0) black or African-American, 2.24% (3) Native American or Alaska Native, 0.0% (0) Asian, 0.0% (0) Pacific Islander or Native Hawaiian, 0.0% (0) from other races, and 8.21% (11) from two or more races. Hispanic or Latino of any race was 2.24% (3) of the population.

Of the 57 households, 29.8% had children under the age of 18; 42.1% were married couples living together; 8.8% had a female householder with no spouse or partner present. 33.3% of households consisted of individuals and 14.0% had someone living alone who was 65 years of age or older. The average household size was 2.2 and the average family size was 3.0. The percent of those with a bachelor's degree or higher was estimated to be 0.7% of the population.

26.1% of the population was under the age of 18, 6.0% from 18 to 24, 22.4% from 25 to 44, 29.9% from 45 to 64, and 15.7% who were 65 years of age or older. The median age was 39.3 years. For every 100 females, there were 91.4 males. For every 100 females ages 18 and older, there were 80.0 males.

The 2016–2020 5-year American Community Survey estimates show that the median household income was $41,250 (with a margin of error of +/- $19,739) and the median family income was $46,250 (+/- $2,103). Males had a median income of $26,750 (+/- $6,844) versus $18,393 (+/- $5,073) for females. The median income for those above 16 years old was $20,938 (+/- $1,912). Approximately, 17.2% of families and 19.5% of the population were below the poverty line, including 27.8% of those under the age of 18 and 0.0% of those ages 65 or over.

=== 2010 census ===
the 2010 census, there were 141 people, 59 households, and 38 families residing in the city. The population density was 261.1 inhabitants per square mile (100.8/km^{2}). There were 84 housing units at an average density of 155.6 per square mile (60.1/km^{2}). The racial makeup of the city was 132 White individuals (93.6%), 8 Hispanic or Latino individuals (5.7%), and one Native American individual (0.7%).

There were 59 households, of which 22 (37.3%) had children under the age of 18 living with them, 24 (40.7%) were married couples living together, 6 (10.2%) had a female householder with no husband present, 8 (13.6%) had a male householder with no wife present, and 21 (35.6%) were non-families. 19 households (32.2%) were made up of individuals, and 8 (13.6%) had someone living alone who was 65 years of age or older. The average household size was 2.39 and the average family size was 2.89.

The median age in the city was 40.2 years. 40 residents (28.4%) were under the age of 18; 10 (7.2%) were between the ages of 18 and 24; 29 (20.6%) were from 25 to 44; 36 (25.6%) were from 45 to 64; and 26 (18.4%) were 65 years of age or older. The gender makeup of the city was 51.1% male and 48.9% female.

=== 2000 census ===
As of the census of 2000, there were 179 people, 76 households, and 45 families residing in the city. The population density was 328.1 inhabitants per square mile (126.7/km^{2}). There were 90 housing units at an average density of 164.9 per square mile (63.7/km^{2}). The racial makeup of the city was 96.65% White, 2.79% Native American, and 0.56% from two or more races. Hispanic or Latino of any race were 2.23% of the population.

There were 76 households, out of which 28.9% had children under the age of 18 living with them, 47.4% were married couples living together, 10.5% had a female householder with no husband present, and 39.5% were non-families. 38.2% of all households were made up of individuals, and 18.4% had someone living alone who was 65 years of age or older. The average household size was 2.36 and the average family size was 3.13.

In the city, the population was spread out, with 30.7% under the age of 18, 3.9% from 18 to 24, 21.8% from 25 to 44, 28.5% from 45 to 64, and 15.1% who were 65 years of age or older. The median age was 39 years. For every 100 females, there were 103.4 males. For every 100 females age 18 and over, there were 100.0 males.

The median income for a household in the city was $27,188, and the median income for a family was $33,000. Males had a median income of $29,250 versus $14,583 for females. The per capita income for the city was $9,543. About 18.8% of families and 24.8% of the population were below the poverty line, including 34.4% of those under the age of eighteen and 21.7% of those 65 or over.

== Education ==
The community is served by Woodson USD 366 public school district.

== Notable people ==
- Benjamin Goss, Wisconsin legislator
- James Swan, Wisconsin legislator

== In popular culture ==
The story of the town having been destroyed by the Great Flood of 1951, was fictionalized in the 1988 album In the Spirit of Things by the rock band Kansas. According to author Dan Fitzgerald, Rich Williams was inspired to create this concept album based on the true stories of the book Ghost Towns of Kansas, Volume II (1979), specifically the chapter on Neosho Falls.

== See also ==
- Southeast Kansas
- Lists of floods in the United States
