= Ottawa, Wisconsin =

- Town
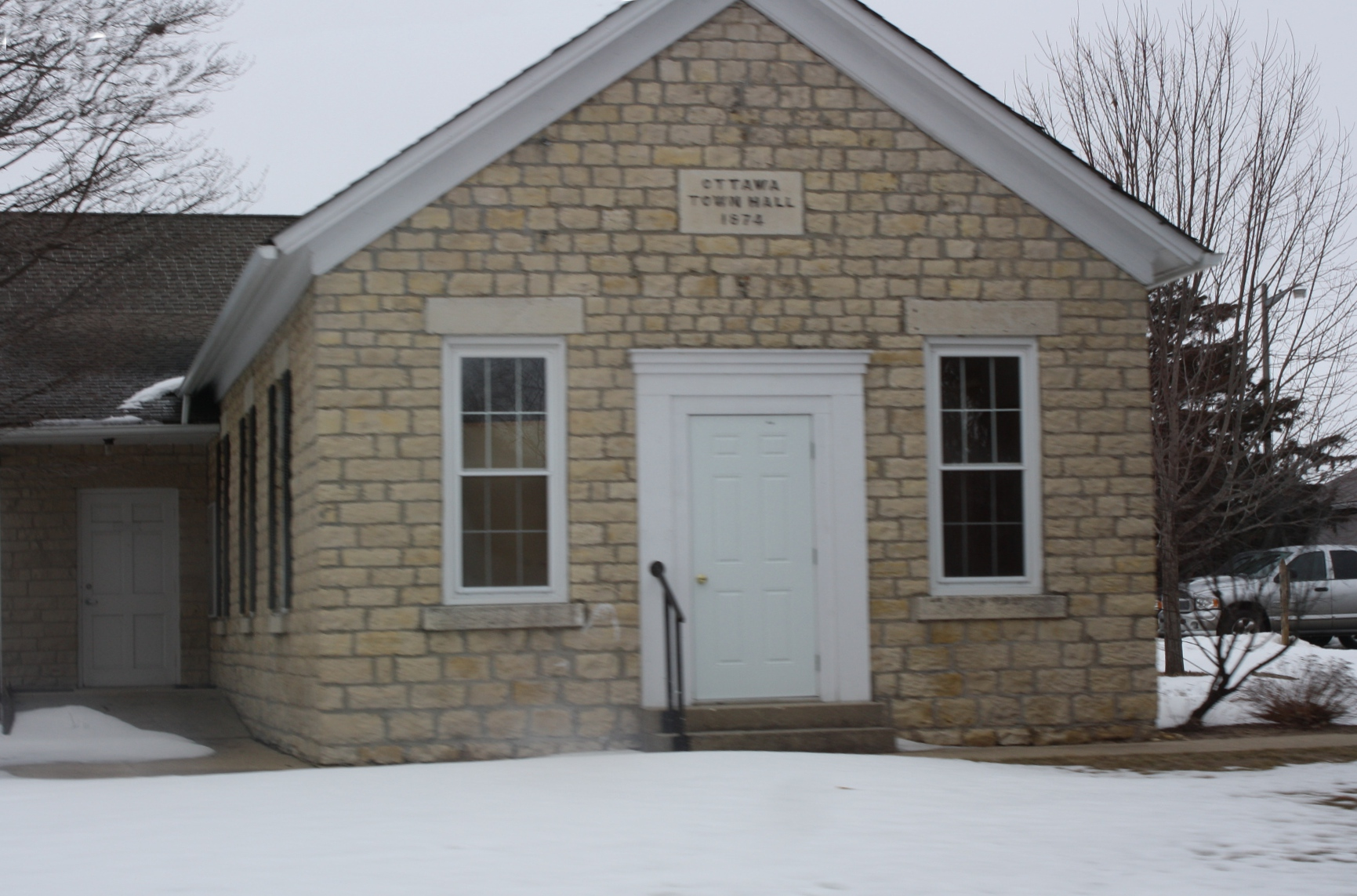
- Town hall

- Location in Waukesha County and the state of Wisconsin.
- Coordinates: 42°58′25″N 88°27′44″W
- Country: United States
- State: Wisconsin
- County: Waukesha

Area
  - Total: 34.9 sq mi (90.4 km^{2})
  - Land: 34.3 sq mi (88.9 km^{2})
  - Water: 0.62 sq mi (1.6 km^{2})
- Elevation: 856 ft (261 m)

Population (2020)
  - Total: 3,646
  - Density: 110/sq mi (42.3/km^{2})
- Time zone: UTC-6 (Central (CST))
  - Summer (DST): UTC-5 (CDT)
- ZIP Code: 53066, 53118
- Area code: 262
- FIPS code: 55-60700
- GNIS feature ID: 1583880
- Website: https://www.tn.ottawa.wi.gov/

Ottawa is a town in Waukesha County, Wisconsin, United States. The population was 3,646 at the 2020 census.

== History ==
The town is named after the Ottawa, a Native American tribe.

== Geography ==
According to the United States Census Bureau, the town has a total area of 34.9 square miles (90.4 km^{2}), of which 34.3 square miles (88.9 km^{2}) is land and 0.6 square mile (1.6 km^{2}) (1.75%) is water.

== Demographics ==
Historical population
Census	Pop.	Note	%±
1980	2,795		—
1990	2,988		6.9%
2000	3,758		25.8%
2010	3,859		2.7%
2020	3,646		−5.5%

As of the census of 2000, there were 3,758 people, 1,375 households, and 1,112 families residing in the town. The population density was 109.5 people per square mile (42.3/km^{2}). There were 1,436 housing units at an average density of 41.8 per square mile (16.2/km^{2}). The racial makeup of the town was 98.06% White, 0.27% African American, 0.40% Native American, 0.24% Asian, 0.37% from other races, and 0.67% from two or more races. Hispanic or Latino of any race were 0.72% of the population.

There were 1,375 households, out of which 36.3% had children under the age of 18 living with them, 74.0% were married couples living together, 3.9% had a female householder with no husband present, and 19.1% were non-families. 16.2% of all households were made up of individuals, and 9.2% had someone living alone who was 65 years of age or older. The average household size was 2.73 and the average family size was 3.06.

In the town, the population was spread out, with 26.4% under the age of 18, 5.8% from 18 to 24, 26.6% from 25 to 44, 29.7% from 45 to 64, and 11.4% who were 65 years of age or older. The median age was 41 years. For every 100 females, there were 100.1 males. For every 100 females age 18 and over, there were 99.8 males.

The median income for a household in the town was $69,493, and the median income for a family was $71,850. Males had a median income of $51,886 versus $35,825 for females. The per capita income for the town was $30,977. About 0.7% of families and 1.7% of the population were below the poverty line, including 0.2% of those under age 18 and 1.0% of those age 65 or over.

== October 2019 tornado ==
On October 1, 2019, a tornado passed through the Town of Ottawa. The tornado was rated EF1 on the Enhanced Fujita scale, with winds estimated at 100 mph. Its path covered 13 miles (20.9 km) and was 100 yards (91.4 m) wide, leaving downed trees and snapped power lines along its path. Damage to property was limited, the most severe being a shed's roof being torn off and thrown a quarter-mile away. No injuries or casualties occurred as a result of the storm.

== Notable people ==
- Caleb C. Harris, physician and politician, lived in the town
