= Woodson USD 366 =

Public school district in Yates Center, Kansas

Address
- 101 W. Butler St. Yates Center, Kansas, 66783; United States
- Coordinates: 37.8825°N 95.7324°W

District information
- Type: Public
- Grades: K to 12
- Schools: 2

Other information
- Website: usd366.net

Woodson USD 366 is a public unified school district headquartered in Yates Center, Kansas, United States. The district includes the communities of Yates Center, Neosho Falls, Piqua, Cookville, Durand, Vernon, and nearby rural areas.

== Schools ==
The school district operates the following schools:

- Yates Center High School.
- Yates Center Elementary School (which includes elementary school and middle school).

== See also ==
- Kansas State Department of Education
- Kansas State High School Activities Association
- List of high schools in Kansas
- List of unified school districts in Kansas
