= Yates Center, Kansas =

City in Woodson County, Kansas, United States

- City and County seat
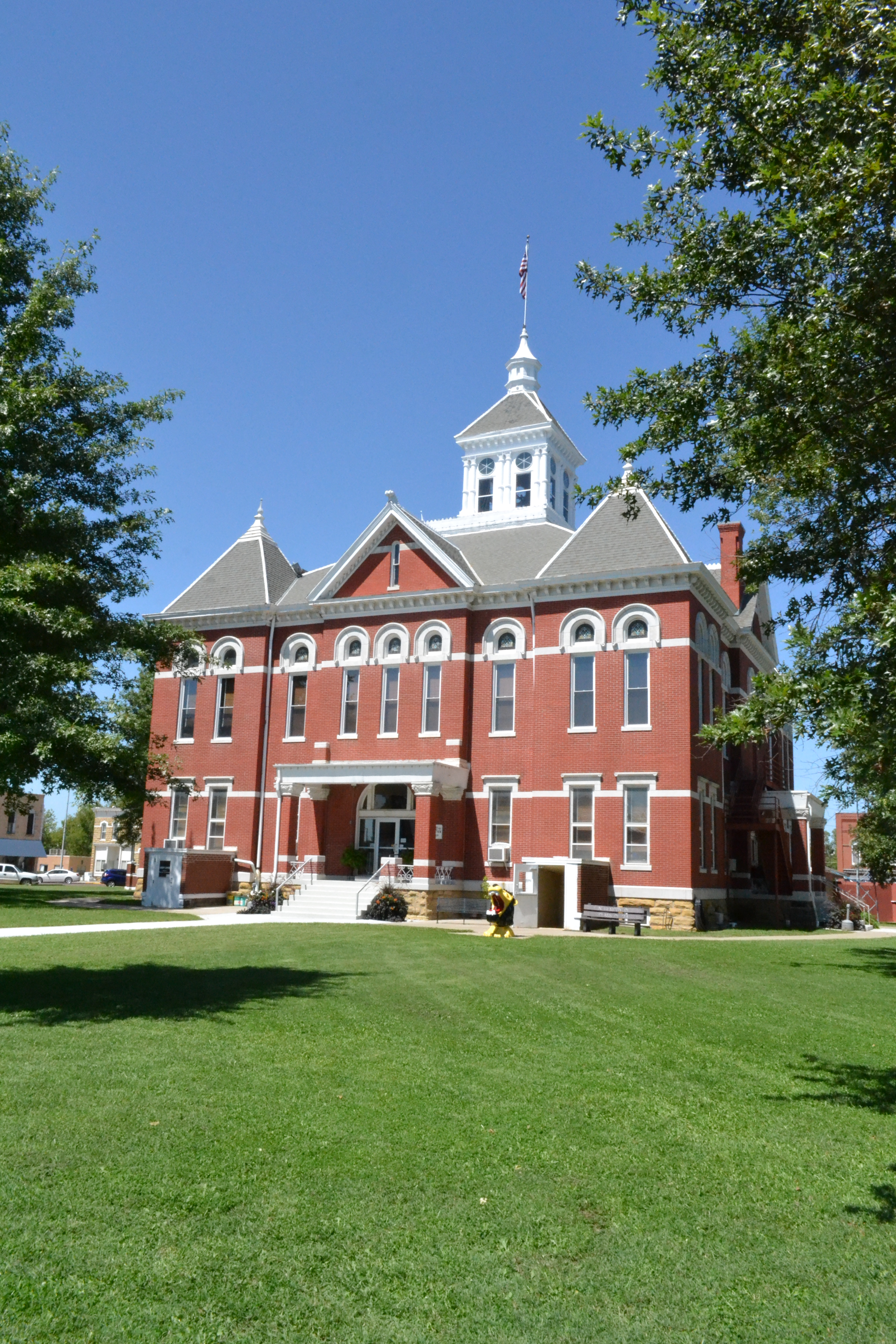
- Woodson County Courthouse (2017)

- Location within Woodson County and Kansas

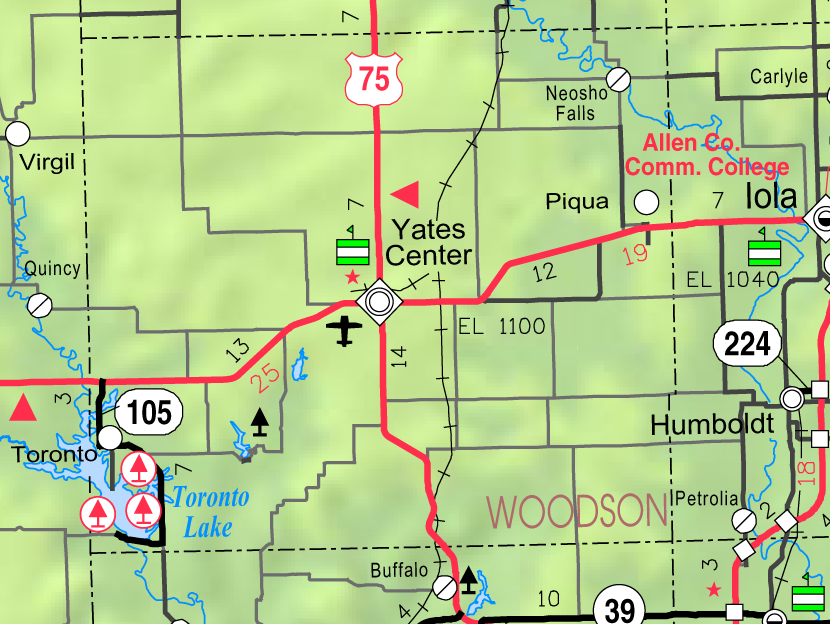
- KDOT map of Woodson County (legend)
- Coordinates: 37°52′58″N 95°43′56″W
- Country: United States
- State: Kansas
- County: Woodson
- Founded: 1875
- Incorporated: 1884

Government
  - Mayor: Justin Weston

Area
  - Total: 3.09 sq mi (8.01 km^{2})
  - Land: 2.66 sq mi (6.89 km^{2})
  - Water: 0.43 sq mi (1.12 km^{2})
- Elevation: 1,093 ft (333 m)

Population (2020)
  - Total: 1,352
  - Density: 508/sq mi (196/km^{2})
- Time zone: UTC-6 (CST)
  - Summer (DST): UTC-5 (CDT)
- ZIP Code: 66783
- Area code: 620
- FIPS code: 20-80700
- GNIS ID: 485664
- Website: cityofyatescenter.com

Yates Center is a city in and the county seat of Woodson County, Kansas, United States. As of the 2020 census, the population of the city was 1,352.

== History ==
Yates Center was founded in August 1875. It was named for Abner Yates, the original owner of the town site, who donated an entire block around the courthouse, land for the churches, a city park, and a lot each for the first two children born in the town. Yates Center is the only town in Kansas to be selected as a county seat before there was a house or inhabitant within its boundaries.

Over thirty buildings in downtown Yates Center, centering on Courthouse Square, are included in the Yates Center Courthouse Square Historic District.

== Geography ==
According to the United States Census Bureau, the city has a total area of 3.05 square miles (7.90 km^{2}), of which 2.61 square miles (6.76 km^{2}) is land and 0.44 square miles (1.14 km^{2}) is water.

=== Climate ===
The climate in this area is characterized by hot, humid summers and generally mild to cool winters. According to the Köppen climate classification system, Yates Center has a humid subtropical climate, abbreviated "Cfa" on climate maps.

Climate data for Yates Center, Kansas, 1991–2020 normals, extremes 1893–present
Month	Jan	Feb	Mar	Apr	May	Jun	Jul	Aug	Sep	Oct	Nov	Dec	Year
Record high °F (°C)	77 (25)	87 (31)	95 (35)	96 (36)	102 (39)	108 (42)	111 (44)	111 (44)	108 (42)	98 (37)	93 (34)	79 (26)	111 (44)
Mean maximum °F (°C)	66.6 (19.2)	71.0 (21.7)	79.3 (26.3)	83.8 (28.8)	87.7 (30.9)	92.8 (33.8)	98.4 (36.9)	98.8 (37.1)	94.3 (34.6)	85.9 (29.9)	74.8 (23.8)	66.9 (19.4)	100.2 (37.9)
Mean daily maximum °F (°C)	42.0 (5.6)	47.4 (8.6)	57.3 (14.1)	66.9 (19.4)	75.2 (24.0)	84.6 (29.2)	89.3 (31.8)	88.8 (31.6)	81.2 (27.3)	69.6 (20.9)	56.8 (13.8)	45.1 (7.3)	67.0 (19.5)
Daily mean °F (°C)	31.3 (−0.4)	35.8 (2.1)	45.2 (7.3)	55.0 (12.8)	64.8 (18.2)	74.2 (23.4)	78.8 (26.0)	77.6 (25.3)	69.5 (20.8)	57.8 (14.3)	45.4 (7.4)	34.9 (1.6)	55.9 (13.2)
Mean daily minimum °F (°C)	20.6 (−6.3)	24.2 (−4.3)	33.1 (0.6)	43.2 (6.2)	54.5 (12.5)	63.9 (17.7)	68.3 (20.2)	66.3 (19.1)	57.9 (14.4)	46.0 (7.8)	33.9 (1.1)	24.6 (−4.1)	44.7 (7.1)
Mean minimum °F (°C)	3.0 (−16.1)	7.9 (−13.4)	15.9 (−8.9)	27.9 (−2.3)	40.7 (4.8)	54.1 (12.3)	59.3 (15.2)	56.4 (13.6)	44.3 (6.8)	29.9 (−1.2)	18.3 (−7.6)	8.0 (−13.3)	−0.6 (−18.1)
Record low °F (°C)	−21 (−29)	−28 (−33)	−4 (−20)	8 (−13)	24 (−4)	39 (4)	45 (7)	44 (7)	28 (−2)	13 (−11)	−1 (−18)	−20 (−29)	−28 (−33)
Average precipitation inches (mm)	1.07 (27)	1.63 (41)	2.67 (68)	4.12 (105)	5.89 (150)	5.47 (139)	5.04 (128)	3.75 (95)	4.37 (111)	3.73 (95)	2.26 (57)	1.81 (46)	41.81 (1,062)
Average snowfall inches (cm)	3.1 (7.9)	1.8 (4.6)	1.0 (2.5)	0.0 (0.0)	0.0 (0.0)	0.0 (0.0)	0.0 (0.0)	0.0 (0.0)	0.0 (0.0)	0.2 (0.51)	0.6 (1.5)	2.3 (5.8)	9.0 (23)
Average precipitation days (≥ 0.01 in)	4.2	4.9	6.7	8.5	10.0	8.2	7.6	7.3	6.7	6.9	5.4	4.8	81.2
Average snowy days (≥ 0.1 in)	2.0	1.0	0.6	0.0	0.0	0.0	0.0	0.0	0.0	0.1	0.4	1.4	5.5
Source 1: NOAA
Source 2: National Weather Service

== Demographics ==
Historical population
Census	Pop.	Note	%±
1880	350		—
1890	1,305		272.9%
1900	1,634		25.2%
1910	2,024		23.9%
1920	2,306		13.9%
1930	2,013		−12.7%
1940	2,176		8.1%
1950	2,178		0.1%
1960	2,080		−4.5%
1970	1,967		−5.4%
1980	1,998		1.6%
1990	1,815		−9.2%
2000	1,599		−11.9%
2010	1,417		−11.4%
2020	1,352		−4.6%
U.S. Decennial Census

=== 2010 census ===
As of the census of 2010, there were 1,417 people, 664 households, and 347 families living in the city. The population density was 542.9 inhabitants per square mile (209.6/km^{2}). There were 821 housing units at an average density of 314.6 per square mile (121.5/km^{2}). The racial makeup of the city was 95.3% White, 0.4% African American, 1.1% Native American, 0.1% Asian, 0.5% from other races, and 2.7% from two or more races. Hispanic or Latino of any race were 1.6% of the population.

There were 664 households, of which 22.6% had children under the age of 18 living with them, 39.5% were married couples living together, 9.5% had a female householder with no husband present, 3.3% had a male householder with no wife present, and 47.7% were non-families. 41.9% of all households were made up of individuals, and 20.5% had someone living alone who was 65 years of age or older. The average household size was 2.08 and the average family size was 2.84.

The median age in the city was 45.1 years. 21.2% of residents were under the age of 18; 6.8% were between the ages of 18 and 24; 21.9% were from 25 to 44; 28% were from 45 to 64; and 22.2% were 65 years of age or older. The gender makeup of the city was 46.9% male and 53.1% female.

=== 2000 census ===
As of the census of 2000, there were 1,599 people, 716 households, and 435 families living in the city. The population density was 553.9 inhabitants per square mile (213.9/km^{2}). There were 844 housing units at an average density of 292.3 per square mile (112.9/km^{2}). The racial makeup of the city was 98.37% White, 0.19% African American, 0.69% Native American, and 0.75% from two or more races. Hispanic or Latino of any race were 1.50% of the population.

There were 716 households, out of which 26.3% had children under the age of 18 living with them, 47.3% were married couples living together, 10.5% had a female householder with no husband present, and 39.2% were non-families. 37.6% of all households were made up of individuals, and 23.2% had someone living alone who was 65 years of age or older. The average household size was 2.17 and the average family size was 2.86.

In the city, the population was spread out, with 21.8% under the age of 18, 8.7% from 18 to 24, 21.3% from 25 to 44, 20.3% from 45 to 64, and 28.0% who were 65 years of age or older. The median age was 44 years. For every 100 females, there were 81.1 males. For every 100 females age 18 and over, there were 79.0 males.

The median income for a household in the city was $23,920, and the median income for a family was $34,018. Males had a median income of $25,250 versus $17,054 for females. The per capita income for the city was $14,180. About 9.0% of families and 12.3% of the population were below the poverty line, including 11.2% of those under age 18 and 18.5% of those age 65 or over.

== Education ==
The community is served by Woodson USD 366 public school district.

== Gallery ==
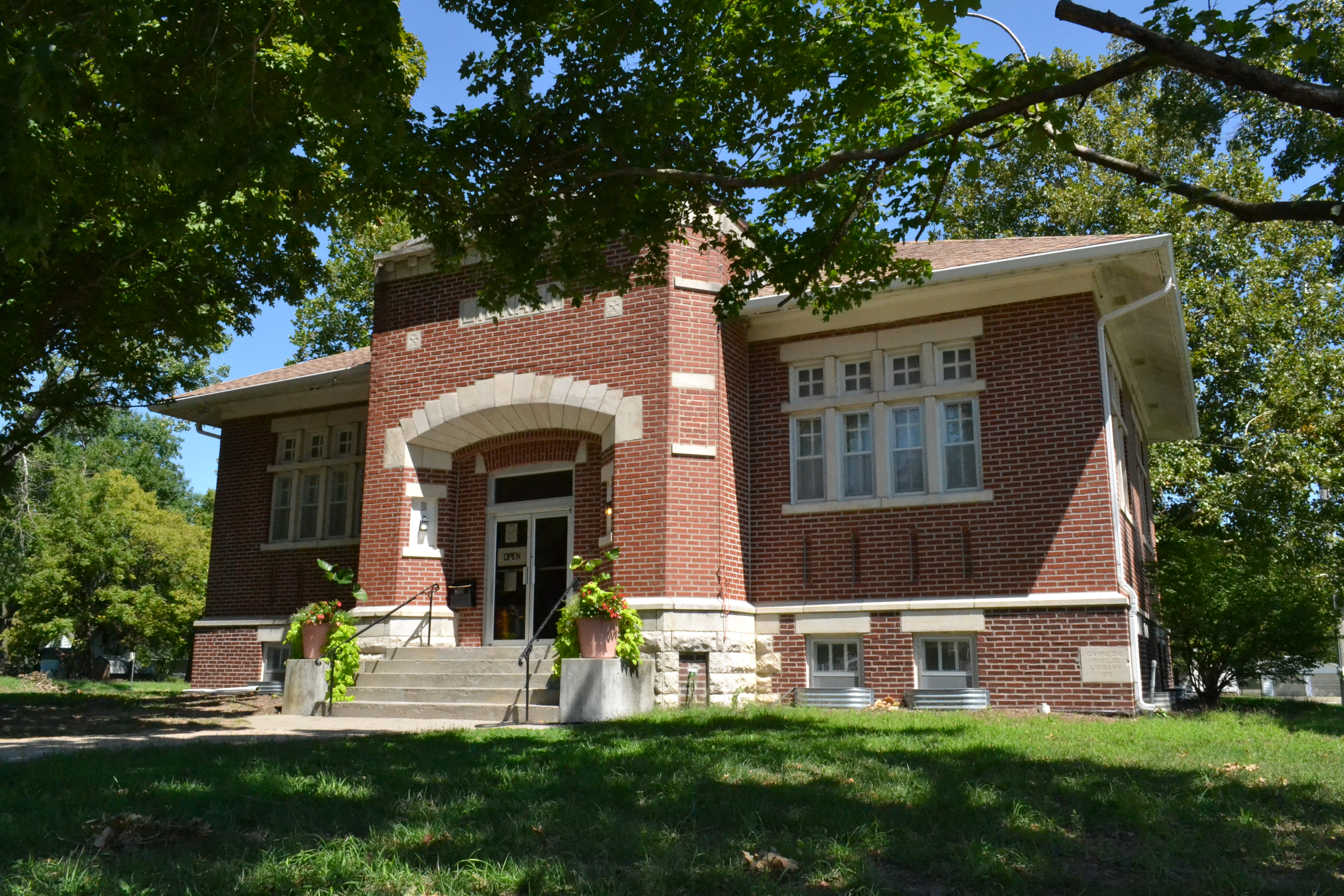
1912 Yates Center Carnegie Library

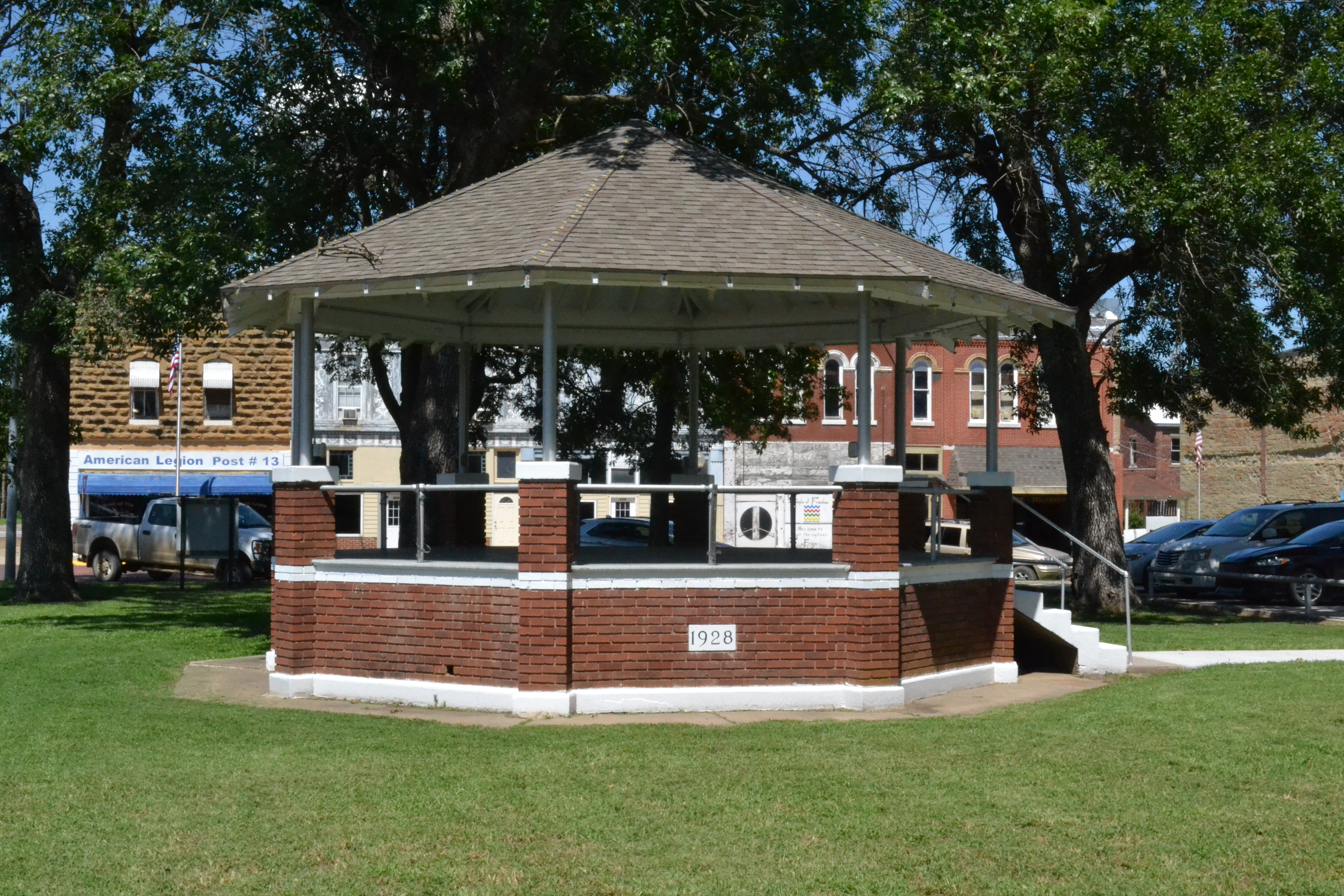
1928 Bandstand

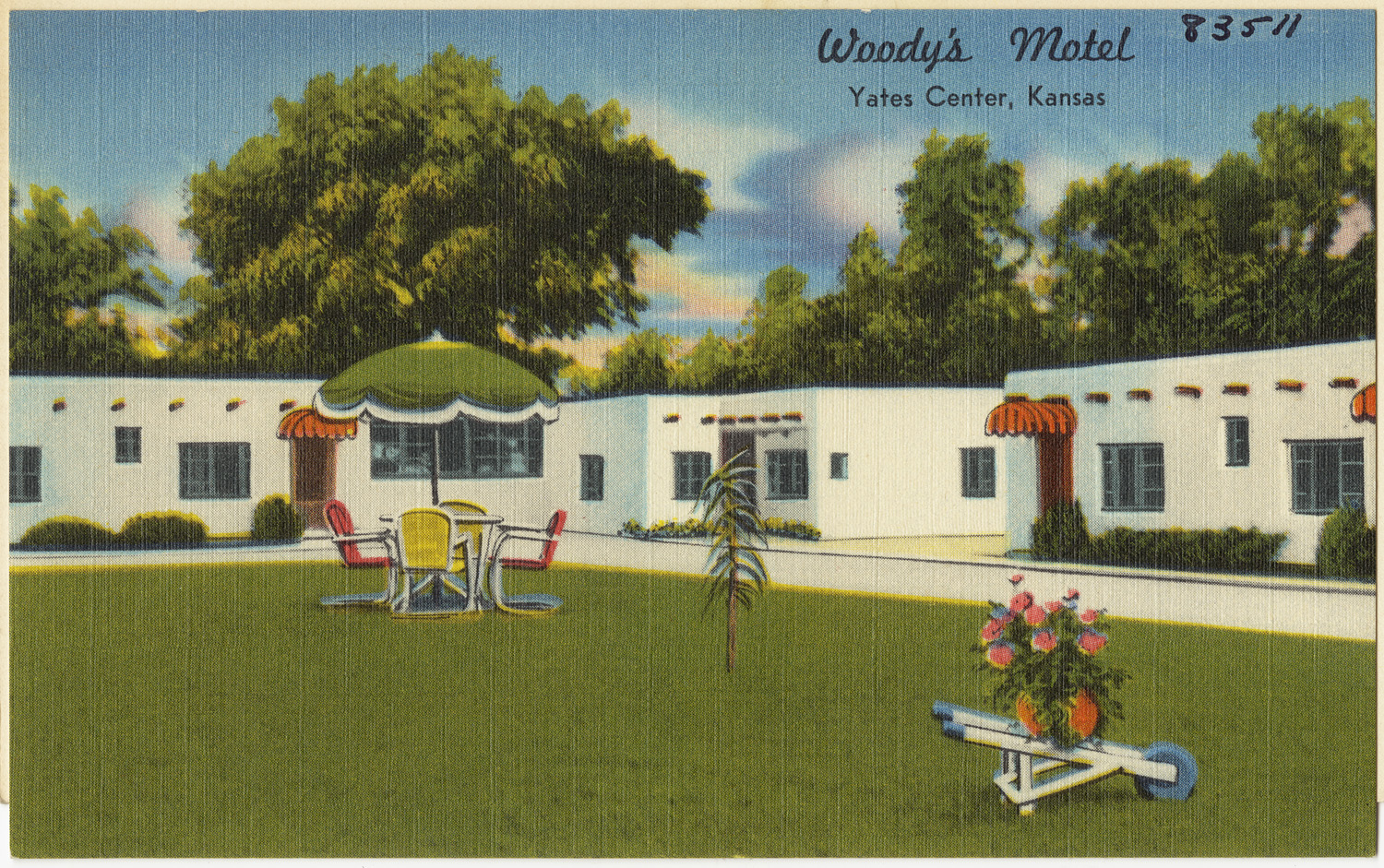
1930s postcard featuring Woody's Motel
