= Caleb C. Harris =

American politician

Caleb C. Harris (September 22, 1836 – September 24, 1904) was an American farmer, physician, and politician.

Born in the township of Springfield, Erie County, Pennsylvania, Harris moved with his parents to Walworth County, Wisconsin, in 1849. In 1857, Harris took part in an expedition against the Sioux tribe in Spirit Lake, Iowa. In 1867, Harris moved to the town of Ottawa, Waukesha County, Wisconsin, where he owned a dairy farm and practiced medicine. Harris served on the Waukesha County Board of Supervisors and was a Republican. In 1895, Harris served in the Wisconsin State Assembly. Harris died at his home in Ottawa, Wisconsin, from peritonitis for which he had surgery.
