= Iola's fort =

Fort in Kansas, US

- Iola, Kansas

Site information
- Type: local militia fort; Civil War Army post
- Controlled by: Iola's militia and various Army units

Location
- Coordinates: 37.9218°N 95.4028°W

Site history
- Built: ca. 1859
- In use: ca. 1859 - 1865
- Materials: stone, earth

Garrison information
- Past commanders: built by Davis Parsons; commanded by various Army officers
- Garrison: various Army units

Iola, Kansas, was founded in 1859, and soon after a two-story stone building was built on the southwest corner of Jefferson and Madison streets. Davis Parsons, one of the first town settlers, built this building, which was to serve as a rallying point and defense headquarters in the event the town was threatened by Bushwhackers or Indians. The local Indians proved reasonably peaceful and no Bushwhackers threatened the area. The stone building was not truly fortified until the Civil War began.

The building was transformed into a blockhouse when the War began and the threats of attacks by Confederate guerrillas grew. The entire block on which the fort stood was fortified. A trench lined with an earthen embankment was constructed on the perimeter of the block.

The fort served as a recruiting station and the Army kept troops in Iola through most of the Civil War. These troops used the blockhouse for their barracks. At times up to 400 men were stationed in Iola. While nearby Humboldt, Kansas, was raided twice in fall 1861, Iola was never attacked by Confederates.

After the War's end, the earthworks were leveled to make way for new building lots. The fort itself was used as a hotel for many years. In 1880 the building was demolished to make way for a new building. The outlines of the earthworks were still visible then. In 1907 a new bank building in turn was erected on the fort site and in 1931 a plaque commemorating the old fort was placed on the side of the bank.
