= Flint Hills Trail =

Recreational trail in Kansas, US

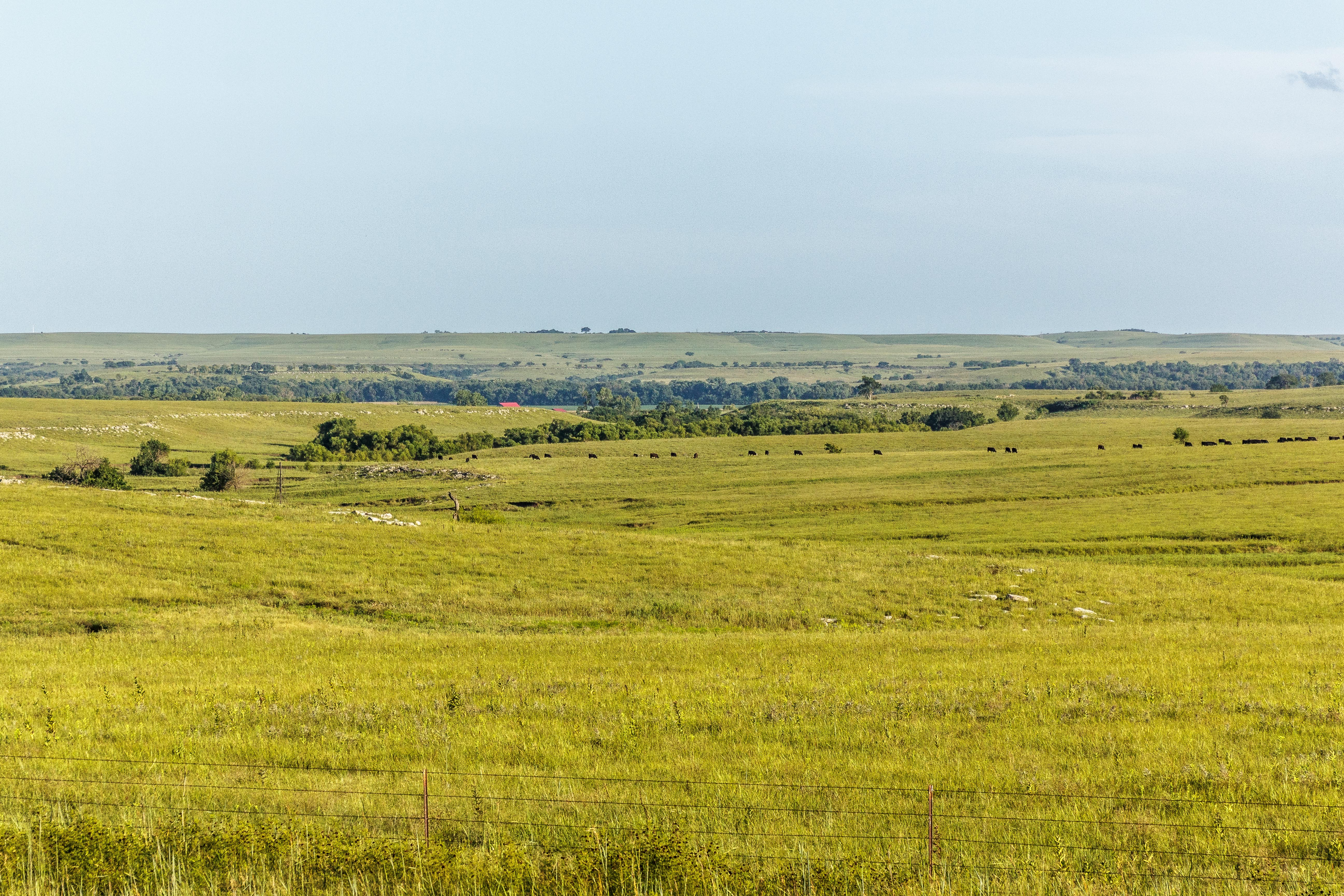
The Flint Hills

Rolling hills with forested valleys characterize the Flint Hills.

The Flint Hills Trail is a hiking, biking, and equestrian trail in the Flint Hills region of eastern Kansas. The trail is 91 miles (146 km) long and reaches from the town of Osawatomie in the east (38.4918°N 94.9659°W) to Council Grove in the west (38.6598°N 96.4783°W). A planned extension from Council Grove to Herington would make its length 118 miles (190 km).

== History ==
The Flint Hills Trail follows the route of the Missouri Pacific Railroad, built in the 1880s. The railroad ceased operations in the 1980s. The Rails-to-Trails Conservancy (RTC) acquired the railroad corridor in 1995 and transferred the ownership to the Kansas branch of the RTC. Volunteers and private contributions built 60 miles (97 km) of the trail. The Kansas Department of Wildlife and Parks designated the trail as a state park in 2018 and named it the Flint Hills Trail State Park. The Department of Wildlife and Parks will complete the trail.

The Flint Hills Trail is the longest trail in Kansas and the eighth longest rail-trail in the U.S. It is part of the coast-to-cost American Discovery Trail. In 2025 the RTC elected the Flint Hill Trails State Park as a member of its Hall of Fame.

== Description ==
The Flint Hills are a distinct ecoregion in eastern Kansas and northern Oklahoma (where they are called the Osage Hills). They feature the tallgrass prairie. Only about 4 percent of tallgrass prairies survive in the United States. Most have been converted into growing crops. The Flint Hills is the largest remaining example of the tallgrass prairie. Much of it has not been converted to cropland because of its undulating landscape and the rock underlying its shallow soils. Cattle ranching is the main economic activity of the Flint Hills, although petroleum is found, especially in Oklahoma.

The trails begins in the town of Osawatomie (home of abolitionist John Brown), and follows the Marais des Cygnes River (Marshland of Swans) through farmland for 19 miles (31 km) to the town of Ottawa. Near Ottawa, the Prairie Spirit Trail, 53 miles (85 km) long, splits off and goes south. Another 11 miles (18 km) further, the trail passes near Pomana State Park and lake, a popular camping spot. Osage is 51 miles (82 km) from the beginning of the trail. The trail then passes through or near several hamlets before reaching Council Grove, Kansas, 91 miles from the start. Council Grove is known as a prominent stopping place on the Santa Fe Trail and the former residence of the Kaw or Kanza Indians. Council Grove has a park dedicated to the Kaw.

The trail passes mostly through farmland at its beginning and ends near the center of the tallgrass prairie. There are numerous on-off spots along the route and parking, food, and lodging in the towns near the trail. Most of the trail has a surface of crushed rock, but a few miles have a dirt surface. The trail is under construction for the 27 miles (43 km) from Council Grove to Herington and is not open for the public.
