= Humboldt High School (Kansas) =

Location
- 1020 New York Street; Humboldt, Kansas 66748; United States; 37.810633°N 95.433308°W

Information
- School type: Public, High School
- Established: 1922
- School board
- School district: Humboldt USD 258
- CEEB code: 171415
- Principal: John Johnson
- Staff: 12.40 (FTE)
- Grades: 9 to 12
- Enrollment: 183 (2023–2024)
- Student to teacher ratio: 14.76
- Colors: Orange and Black
- Athletics conference: Tri-Valley League
- Mascot: Cub
- Newspaper: Cub Tracks
- Website: www.usd258.net/page/high-school

Humboldt High School is a high school (grades 9-12) in Humboldt, Kansas, United States, and operated by Humboldt USD 258 school district. As of the 2014–2015 school year, Humboldt High School has an enrollment of 182 students and has a student-teacher ratio of 91:9.

== Academics ==
Humboldt High School operates on an 7:55 am to 3:25 pm schedule, which includes eight periods. Classes follow traditional scheduling. Although there are eight available periods, students may only take a maximum of seven classes. Students attend the same classes Monday through Friday.

== Extracurricular activities ==
The extracurricular activities offered at Humboldt High School are small and fairly limited due to the school's small size. The Cubs are classified as a 3A school. Throughout its history, Humboldt has won two state championships.

=== Athletics ===
The Humboldt Cubs compete in the Tri-Valley League. Humboldt High School offers several sports including football, basketball, baseball, track, volleyball, cross-country, cheerleading, and many more. Due to the small school population, many students are multi-sport athletes.

==== Basketball ====
The Cubs boys' basketball team won the state championship in 1969 under Coach Don Walburn.

==== Football ====
The Cubs football team was named Tri-Valley League Champions in 2006 and 2007. Humboldt won the Tri-Valley League championship in football in 1968 as well and went undefeated.

==== Boys' Golf ====
The boys' golf team won the 2002 state championship at Turkey Creek Golf Course in Burrton, Kansas.

==== State championships ====
State Championships
Season	Sport	Number of Championships	Year
Winter	Basketball	1	1969
Spring	Golf, Boys	3	1976 (2-Man), 1979 (2-Man), 2002
Spring	Track & Field, Girls	1	1979
Total		5	

=== Non-athletic activities ===
==== Scholar's Bowl ====
The Cubs Scholar's Bowl team won four straight TVL titles from 1998 to 2001, and was the State runner-up in 2001, losing the lead on the last question of the championship round.

==== Journalism ====
Humboldt High School's Journalism Department has won 30 Kansas Scholastic Press Association regional journalism championships and 14 state championships (1975, 1979, 1986, 1989, 1990, 1991, 1992, 1995, 1997, 1998, 2000, 2001, 2008, 2009), and has retired two separate traveling trophies by winning three-straight championships in a row twice. Journalism students at HHS have won 61 individual state championships. The school newspaper Cub Tracks has been continually published since 1973. It was inducted into the National Scholastic Press Association's Hall of Fame at that association's Fall Convention in 2000, and won 3rd place in the National Best of Show competition at that same event. Since the All-Kansas Competition began in 1991, Cub Tracks has won a top rating 14 times. The Cub yearbook has also won numerous top ratings from the KSPA.

== Notable alumni ==
- George Sweatt, former baseball player for the Kansas City Monarchs and the Chicago American Giants, the only player in the league to play in all of the first four Negro League World Series while with those two teams

== See also ==
- List of high schools in Kansas
- List of unified school districts in Kansas
