= Humboldt, Kansas =

City in Allen County, Kansas

- City
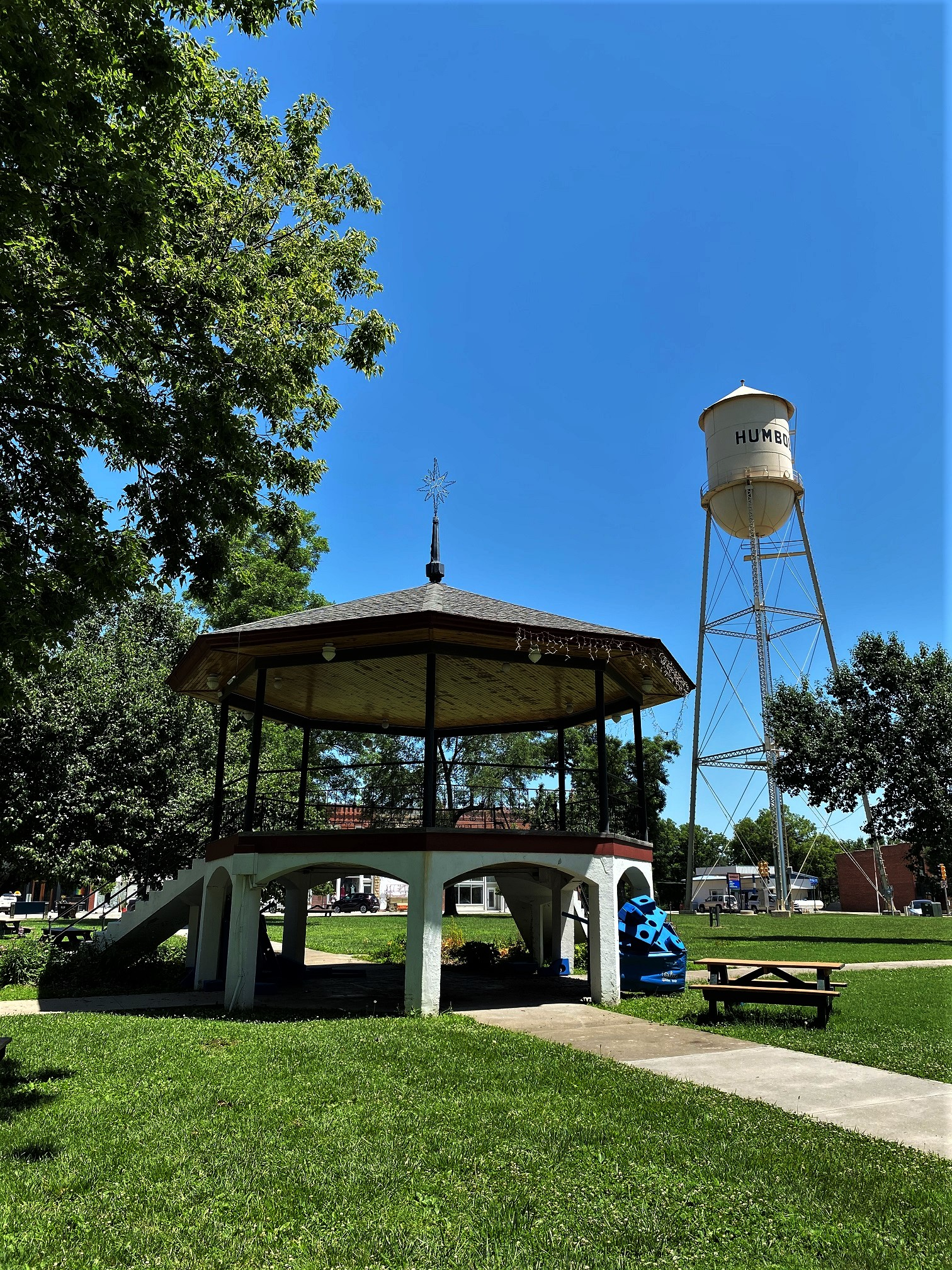
- City Square Park Bandstand and City Water Tower (2021)

- Logo

- Location within Allen County and Kansas

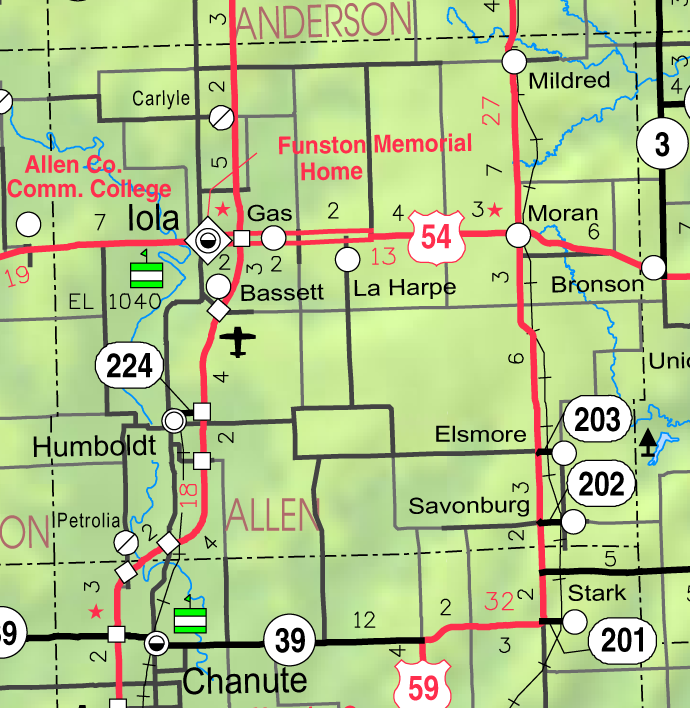
- KDOT map of Allen County (legend)
- Coordinates: 37°48′45″N 95°26′11″W
- Country: United States
- State: Kansas
- County: Allen
- Founded: 1857
- Incorporated: 1878
- Named for: Baron von Humboldt

Area
  - Total: 1.50 sq mi (3.89 km^{2})
  - Land: 1.49 sq mi (3.87 km^{2})
  - Water: 0.0077 sq mi (0.02 km^{2}) 0.69%
- Elevation: 974 ft (297 m)

Population (2020)
  - Total: 1,847
  - Density: 1,240/sq mi (477/km^{2})
- Time zone: UTC-6 (CST)
  - Summer (DST): UTC-5 (CDT)
- ZIP Code: 66748
- Area code: 620
- FIPS code: 20-33450
- GNIS ID: 485596
- Website: humboldtkansas.com

Humboldt is a city in Allen County, Kansas, United States. It is situated along the Neosho River. As of the 2020 census, the population of the city was 1,847.

== History ==
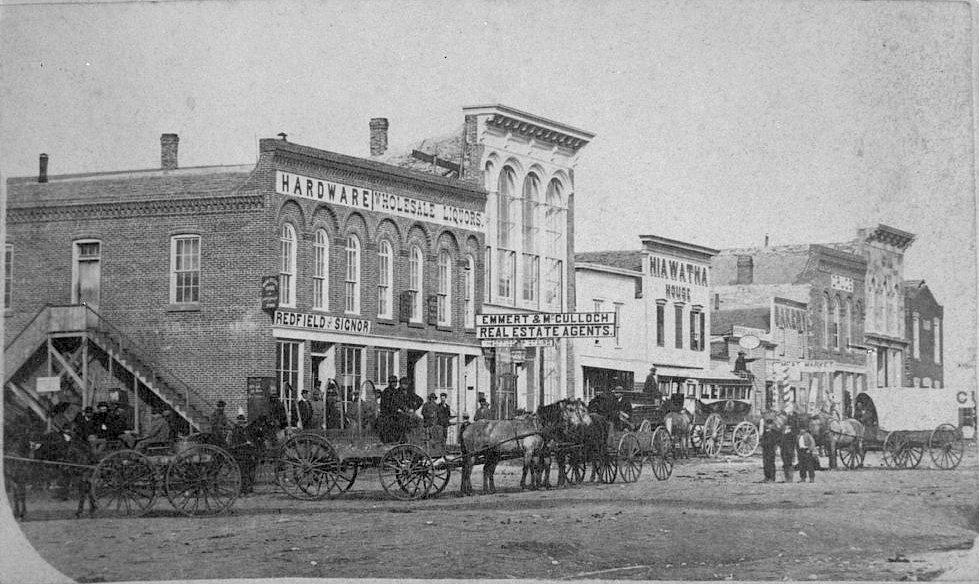
Humboldt, c. 1865–1875

=== 19th century ===
Humboldt, originally an American settlement named after Baron von Humboldt, was founded in 1857. Germans migrating from Hartford, Connecticut, began organizing a colony during the winter of 1856–57. They arrived in Lawrence, Kansas, in March 1857, and at the townsite on May 10, 1857. Orlin Thurston, a young attorney, moved to Humboldt during the summer of 1857 and put up a steam sawmill; he began sawing wood and building houses on the prairie side of town. The first frame building was erected by J.A. Coffey; and in May 1858, W.C. O'Brien opened the first gristmill in the county. The United Brethren Denomination erected the first church in 1859.

In 1861 Humboldt was attacked by a collection of border ruffians and Osages led by John Allen Mathews out of Oswego, Kansas who took several recently freed African-Americans back into captivity. The Humboldt Home Guard joined with the Kansas 6th Cavalry under James G. Blunt to counter-attack. In a battle on September. 18, 1861 Mathews was killed at Chetopa, Kansas.

The city was organized as a village in 1866 and incorporated as a city of the second class by the act of February 28, 1870. In October 1870 the Leavenworth, Lawrence & Galveston railway was run through Humboldt; the railway was operated during the 20th century as part of the Atchison, Topeka and Santa Fe Railway and is currently operated by the South Kansas and Oklahoma Railroad.

Humboldt was the Allen county seat for seven years, from 1858 until 1865, when Iola became the seat. Humboldt won two contentious legislative elections to become the seat in 1858 and 1860, but another election in 1865 at the end of the American Civil War resulted in the re-location of the county seat to Iola. The legitimacy of this election was questioned by Humboldt residents due to low turnout arising from soldiers fighting the War. Some residents claim that the county seat was "stolen". Iola effectively secured the seat by donating 100 lots to the county to aid in the construction of public buildings and subsequently raising funds to build a courthouse. However, Humboldt was also guilty of shady practices. Lieut. Col. Charles W. Blair, the commander of Fort Scott, temporarily replaced the commander of the post at Humboldt, Maj. Henry C. Haas, to keep the soldiers there from illegally voting in the county seat election. Blair claimed none of the troops were legal voters in Humboldt. The Humboldt newspaper, however, denied the troops had been involved in any wrongdoing. County seat wars of this sort were common in Kansas and the American West.

=== Civil War fortifications ===
Humboldt was very much involved in the American Civil War. The town was raided September 1, 1861, by Confederate raiders, who took much property and kidnapped eight free blacks, who may have been placed into slavery. Several persons may have been wounded by gunfire, but no one was killed. Many of the raiders were hunted down and one of the leaders, Col. John Allen Mathews, was killed.

Actions were taken to prevent Humboldt coming under further attack. Two home guard companies were organized in the Humboldt area. These militia units sought to protect the town and to scout as far south as the Kansas-Indian Territory border to prevent Confederates from coming too close to town. Some of the militia were involved with the pursuit of the September raiders. Two Humboldt area structures, O'Brien's Mill and W. W. Curdy dry goods store, were fortified.

Humboldt fell victim to another raid on October 14, 1861, 1 1/2 months after the first raid. The second raid caught the town totally off guard and the 100 home guards surrendered when they discovered they could not protect the town from the 330 raiders. O'Brien's Mill and most of the town was burned. The W. W. Curdy store apparently was spared, but it played no further role in Humboldt's defenses. It was said the second raid was at least in part revenge for the killing of Mathews and for the actions of U.S. Senator James H. Lane and his brigade's sacking and destruction of Osceola, Missouri.

After the second raid the threats to Humboldt's safety were taken very seriously. At times the town had local militia units operating and most of the rest of the Civil War the town had Army troops stationed there. Sometimes the military post there was called Post Humboldt. A blockhouse was partially constructed at 514 S. 3rd Street. This was used by the local militia as its headquarters and as a recruiting office.

Other points in town were used by the military. The German settlers in town built a church on Bridge Street, in the east part of town. This was used as the post's quartermaster store and was run by a sergeant. On the west side of town, a number of cabins were built on the east side of the Neosho River. This was sometimes called Log Town, but was more commonly known as Camp Hunter. When the ranks swelled beyond the capacity of the cabins, tents were pitched at the camp. Of the places used by the military, home guards and militia, today only the German church stands and it was converted into a private residence in the 1950s. The geographic coordinates of the various points are:

- O'Brien's Mill (approx. location) – 37°49′44″N 95°27′38″W
- Camp Hunter – 37°48′19″N 95°26′51″W
- German church – 37°48′41″N 95°25′57″W
- W. W. Curdy dry goods store (approx. location) – 37°48′40″N 95°26′15″W
- Blockhouse – 37°48′22″N 95°26′27″W

In October 1864, the area was threatened by a huge raid through Missouri and eastern Kansas. The Confederate raiders were commanded by Maj. Gen. Sterling Price and most of the troops and militia went to meet the threat further east. Also, in the same time period Maj. Haas, in command of the troops, and Maj. Watson Stewart, in command of the militia had differences of opinion as to the extent of the jurisdiction of Haas. Haas wanted control of the militia and Stewart contested this. The militia maintained its independence, but not until Haas managed to arrest one of the militia's officers.

The post at Humboldt was manned by troops at least through June 1865. It probably lasted into July and very possibly into August. When troops abandoned the town, the use of the military buildings came to an end, as well.

== Geography ==
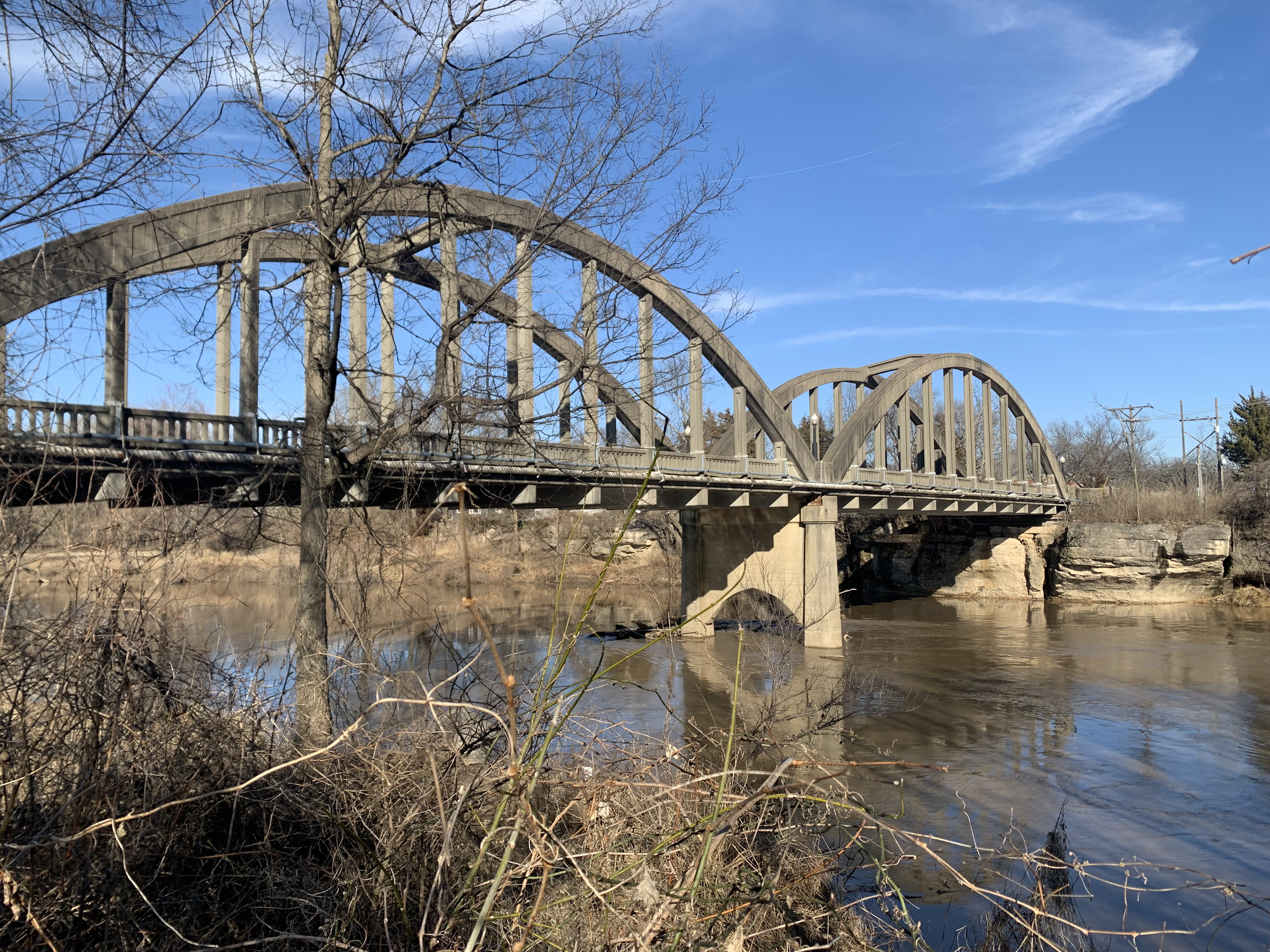
Neosho River at Bridge Street in Humboldt (2026)

According to the United States Census Bureau, the city has a total area of 1.45 square miles (3.76 km^{2}), of which 1.44 square miles (3.73 km^{2}) is land and 0.01 square miles (0.03 km^{2}) is water.

Humboldt is situated along the east bank of the Neosho River, midway between Iola (to the north) and Chanute (to the south, in Neosho County) along Old 169 Highway.

=== Climate ===
The climate in this area is characterized by hot, humid summers and generally mild to cool winters. According to the Köppen climate classification system, Humboldt has a humid subtropical climate, abbreviated "Cfa" on climate maps.

Climate data for Humboldt, Kansas (1991–2020)
Month	Jan	Feb	Mar	Apr	May	Jun	Jul	Aug	Sep	Oct	Nov	Dec	Year
Mean daily maximum °F (°C)	42.2 (5.7)	47.3 (8.5)	57.4 (14.1)	66.8 (19.3)	75.3 (24.1)	84.7 (29.3)	89.6 (32.0)	88.7 (31.5)	81.1 (27.3)	69.9 (21.1)	56.6 (13.7)	45.4 (7.4)	67.1 (19.5)
Daily mean °F (°C)	31.8 (−0.1)	36.3 (2.4)	45.7 (7.6)	55.1 (12.8)	65.0 (18.3)	74.7 (23.7)	79.3 (26.3)	77.7 (25.4)	69.5 (20.8)	57.9 (14.4)	45.6 (7.6)	35.3 (1.8)	56.2 (13.4)
Mean daily minimum °F (°C)	21.4 (−5.9)	25.3 (−3.7)	34.0 (1.1)	43.4 (6.3)	54.7 (12.6)	64.6 (18.1)	69.1 (20.6)	66.7 (19.3)	57.9 (14.4)	46.0 (7.8)	34.6 (1.4)	25.2 (−3.8)	45.2 (7.4)
Average precipitation inches (mm)	1.30 (33)	1.63 (41)	2.83 (72)	4.18 (106)	5.83 (148)	5.33 (135)	4.77 (121)	4.38 (111)	4.34 (110)	3.45 (88)	2.41 (61)	1.85 (47)	42.3 (1,073)
Average snowfall inches (cm)	3.5 (8.9)	1.4 (3.6)	1.0 (2.5)	0.0 (0.0)	0.0 (0.0)	0.0 (0.0)	0.0 (0.0)	0.0 (0.0)	0.0 (0.0)	0.0 (0.0)	0.4 (1.0)	3.0 (7.6)	9.3 (23.6)
Source: NOAA

== Demographics ==
Historical population
Census	Pop.	Note	%±
1870	1,202		—
1880	1,542		28.3%
1890	1,361		−11.7%
1900	1,402		3.0%
1910	2,548		81.7%
1920	2,525		−0.9%
1930	2,558		1.3%
1940	2,290		−10.5%
1950	2,308		0.8%
1960	2,285		−1.0%
1970	2,249		−1.6%
1980	2,230		−0.8%
1990	2,178		−2.3%
2000	1,999		−8.2%
2010	1,953		−2.3%
2020	1,847		−5.4%
U.S. Decennial Census

=== 2020 census ===
As of the 2020 census, Humboldt had a population of 1,847, including 796 households and 508 families. The population density was 1,209.6 per square mile (467.0/km^{2}). There were 903 housing units at an average density of 591.4 per square mile (228.3/km^{2}).

The median age was 41.9 years. 23.3% of residents were under the age of 18, 8.2% were from 18 to 24, 22.1% were from 25 to 44, 25.0% were from 45 to 64, and 21.5% were 65 years of age or older. For every 100 females there were 89.4 males, and for every 100 females age 18 and over there were 89.2 males age 18 and over. 0.0% of residents lived in urban areas, while 100.0% lived in rural areas.

There were 796 households, of which 28.8% had children under the age of 18 living in them. Of all households, 42.7% were married-couple households, 18.7% were households with a male householder and no spouse or partner present, and 29.1% were households with a female householder and no spouse or partner present. About 30.6% of all households were made up of individuals, and 16.4% had someone living alone who was 65 years of age or older.

There were 903 housing units, of which 11.8% were vacant. The homeowner vacancy rate was 2.0% and the rental vacancy rate was 12.9%.

Racial composition as of the 2020 census
Race	Number	Percent
White	1,632	88.4%
Black or African American	30	1.6%
American Indian and Alaska Native	25	1.4%
Asian	2	0.1%
Native Hawaiian and Other Pacific Islander	0	0.0%
Some other race	32	1.7%
Two or more races	126	6.8%
Hispanic or Latino (of any race)	112	6.1%

Non-Hispanic White residents were 86.25% of the population.

=== Demographic estimates ===
The 2016–2020 5-year American Community Survey estimates reported an average household size of 2.5 and an average family size of 3.2. The percent of those with a bachelor's degree or higher was estimated to be 15.8% of the population.

=== Income and poverty ===
The 2016–2020 5-year American Community Survey estimates show that the median household income was $42,169 (with a margin of error of +/- $7,041) and the median family income was $54,514 (+/- $11,090). Males had a median income of $30,438 (+/- $5,565) versus $24,113 (+/- $1,303) for females. The median income for those above 16 years old was $24,681 (+/- $4,424). Approximately, 16.9% of families and 17.4% of the population were below the poverty line, including 26.2% of those under the age of 18 and 14.6% of those ages 65 or over.

=== 2010 census ===
As of the census of 2010, there were 1,953 people, 829 households, and 511 families residing in the city. The population density was 1,356.3 inhabitants per square mile (523.7/km^{2}). There were 923 housing units at an average density of 641.0 per square mile (247.5/km^{2}). The racial makeup of the city was 94.0% White, 1.4% African American, 0.6% Native American, 0.1% Pacific Islander, 2.0% from other races, and 2.0% from two or more races. Hispanic or Latino of any race were 5.1% of the population.

There were 829 households, of which 30.6% had children under the age of 18 living with them, 46.2% were married couples living together, 10.0% had a female householder with no husband present, 5.4% had a male householder with no wife present, and 38.4% were non-families. 34.0% of all households were made up of individuals, and 17.6% had someone living alone who was 65 years of age or older. The average household size was 2.33 and the average family size was 2.97.

The median age in the city was 40.7 years. 25.2% of residents were under the age of 18; 6.9% were between the ages of 18 and 24; 23.6% were from 25 to 44; 26.5% were from 45 to 64; and 18% were 65 years of age or older. The gender makeup of the city was 46.8% male and 53.2% female.

== Events ==
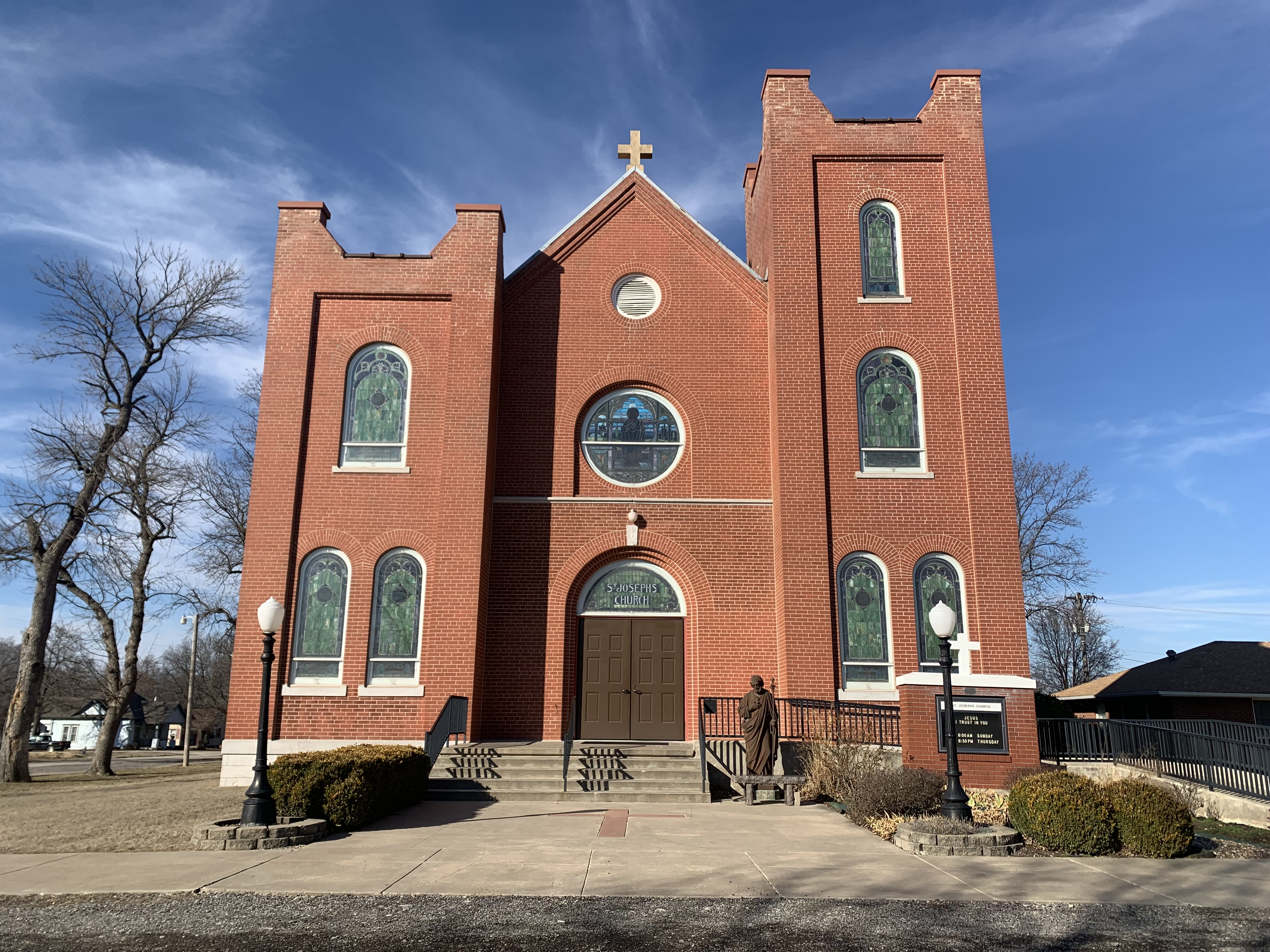
St Joseph's Church in Humboldt (2026)

Humboldt is the location of the Biblesta parade. Local churches, businesses, and organizations create floats for the parade based on Bible stories. Other festivities during Biblesta generally include a music concert and bean feed.

== Education ==
The community is served by Humboldt USD 258 public school district, with three schools, serves 498 students.

- Humboldt High School, grades 9–12
- Humboldt Middle School, grades 6–8
- Humboldt Elementary School, grades K–5

== Infrastructure ==
The old highway passes through the center of town, while the current U.S. Route 169 passes by approximately one mile to the east.

Rail service to Tulsa, Oklahoma and other points is available in Humboldt; the South Kansas and Oklahoma Railroad line ends at Hawaii Road on the city's east side.

Allen County Airport is located only a few miles to the northeast.

The nearest intercity bus stops are located in Gas and Chanute. Service is provided by Jefferson Lines on a route from Minneapolis to Tulsa.

== Notable people ==
- Walter Johnson, Hall of Fame pitcher who won 417 games for the Washington Senators
- George Sweatt, player with the Kansas City Monarchs

== See also ==
- Great Flood of 1951
