= City Square Park Bandstand =

Public structure in Kansas, U.S.

- U.S. National Register of Historic Places
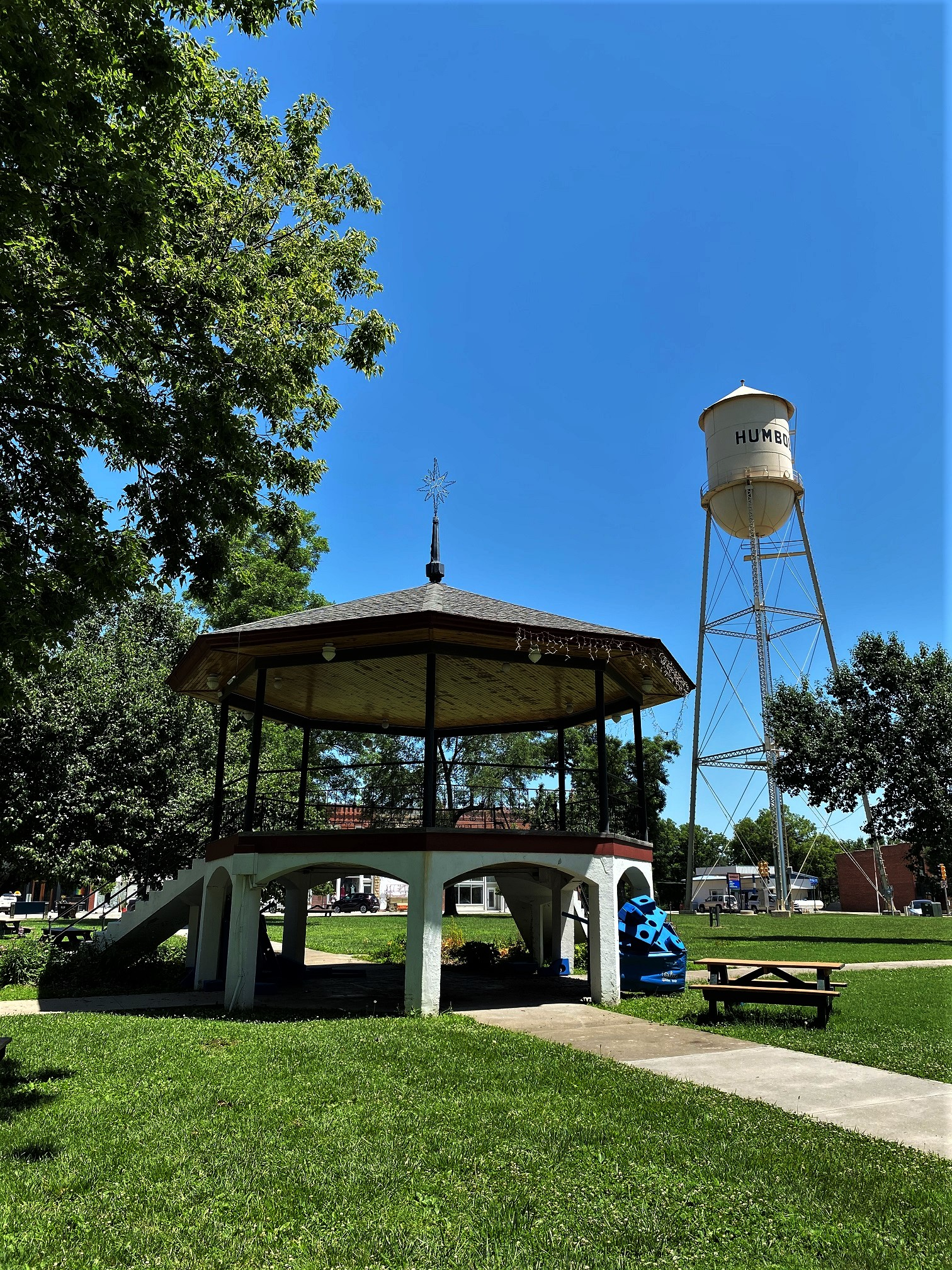
- The City Square Park Bandstand in 2021

- Location within Kansas Location within the United States
- Location: 100 S. 9th St. Humboldt, Kansas
- Coordinates: 37°48′39″N 95°26′10″W
- Area: Less than one acre
- Built: 1907
- Built by: John Nessel
- Architect: Charles M. Smith
- NRHP reference No.: 13001036
- Added to NRHP: January 8, 2014

The City Square Park Bandstand, at 100 S. 9th St. in Humboldt, Kansas, was built in 1907. It was listed on the National Register of Historic Places in 2014.

It is an octagonal bandstand with an asphalt roof and a spire, located at the center of City Square Park, a one-block park. Charles M. Smith designed the bandstand and John Nessel contracted to build it.
