= Iola, Kansas =

City in Allen County, Kansas

- City and County seat
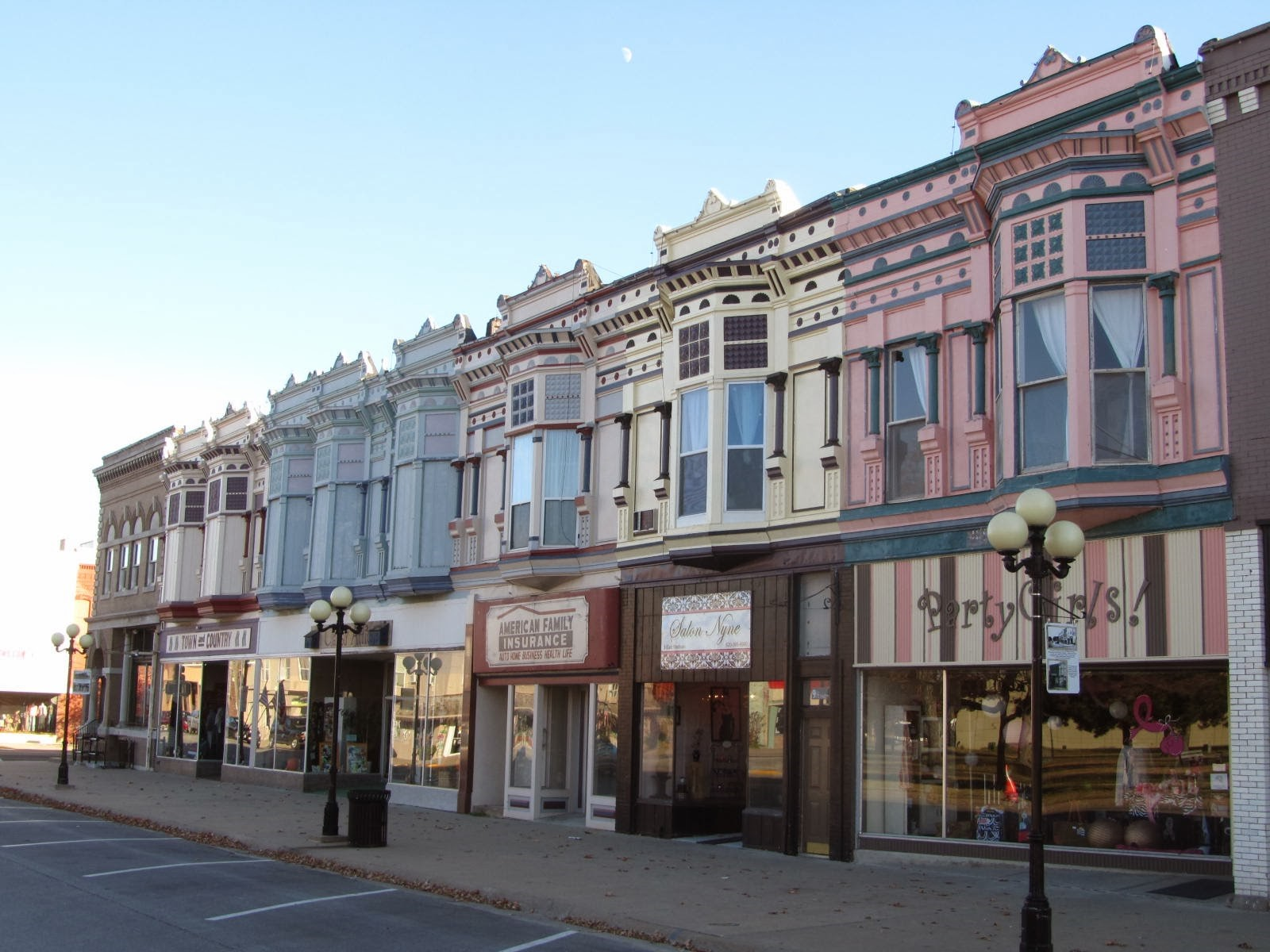
- South side of the downtown square (2017)

- Flag Logo

- Location within Allen County and Kansas

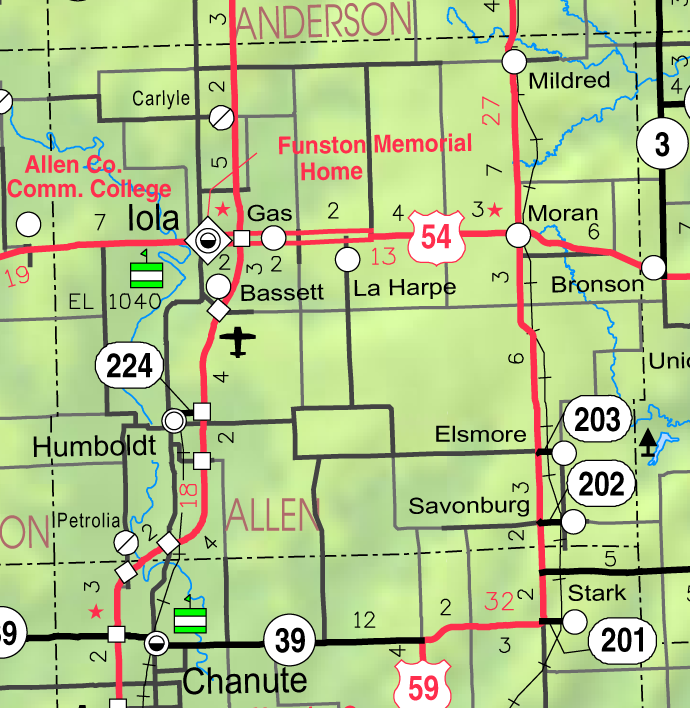
- KDOT map of Allen County (legend)
- Coordinates: 37°55′39″N 95°24′02″W
- Country: United States
- State: Kansas
- County: Allen
- Founded: 1859
- Incorporated: 1870
- Named for: Iola Colborn

Government
  - Type: Mayor–Council

Area
  - Total: 4.74 sq mi (12.27 km^{2})
  - Land: 4.46 sq mi (11.56 km^{2})
  - Water: 0.27 sq mi (0.71 km^{2})
- Elevation: 968 ft (295 m)

Population (2020)
  - Total: 5,396
  - Density: 1,209/sq mi (466.8/km^{2})
- Time zone: UTC-6 (CST)
  - Summer (DST): UTC-5 (CDT)
- ZIP Code: 66749
- Area code: 620
- FIPS code: 20-34300
- GNIS ID: 485599
- Website: CityOfIola.com

Iola (/aɪˈoʊlə/) is a city in and the county seat of Allen County, Kansas, United States. The city is situated along the Neosho River in southeast Kansas. As of the 2020 census, the population of the city was 5,396. It is named in honor of Iola Colborn, the wife of Josiah Colborn, one of the town's founders.

== History ==
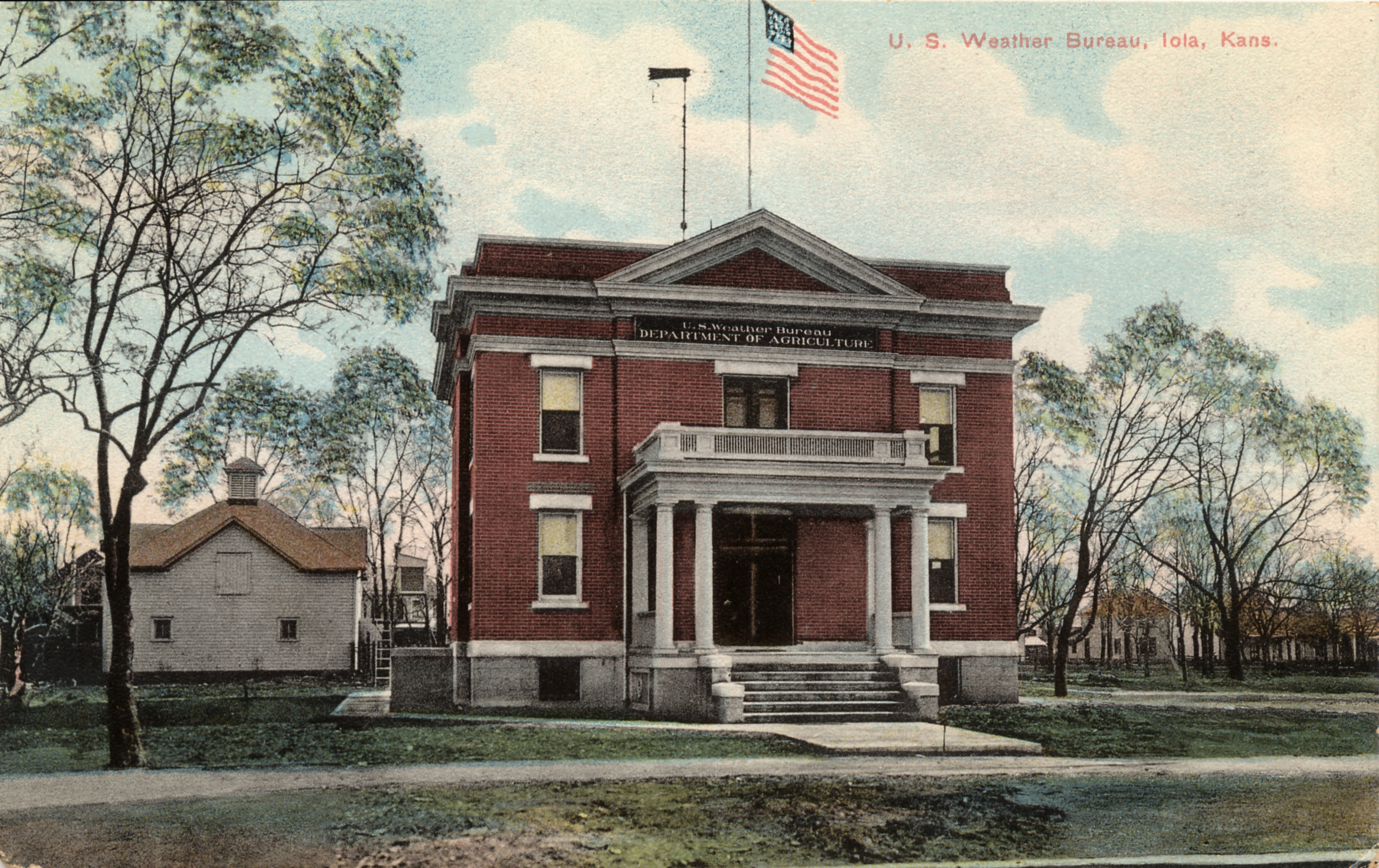
U.S. Weather Bureau (circa 1900)

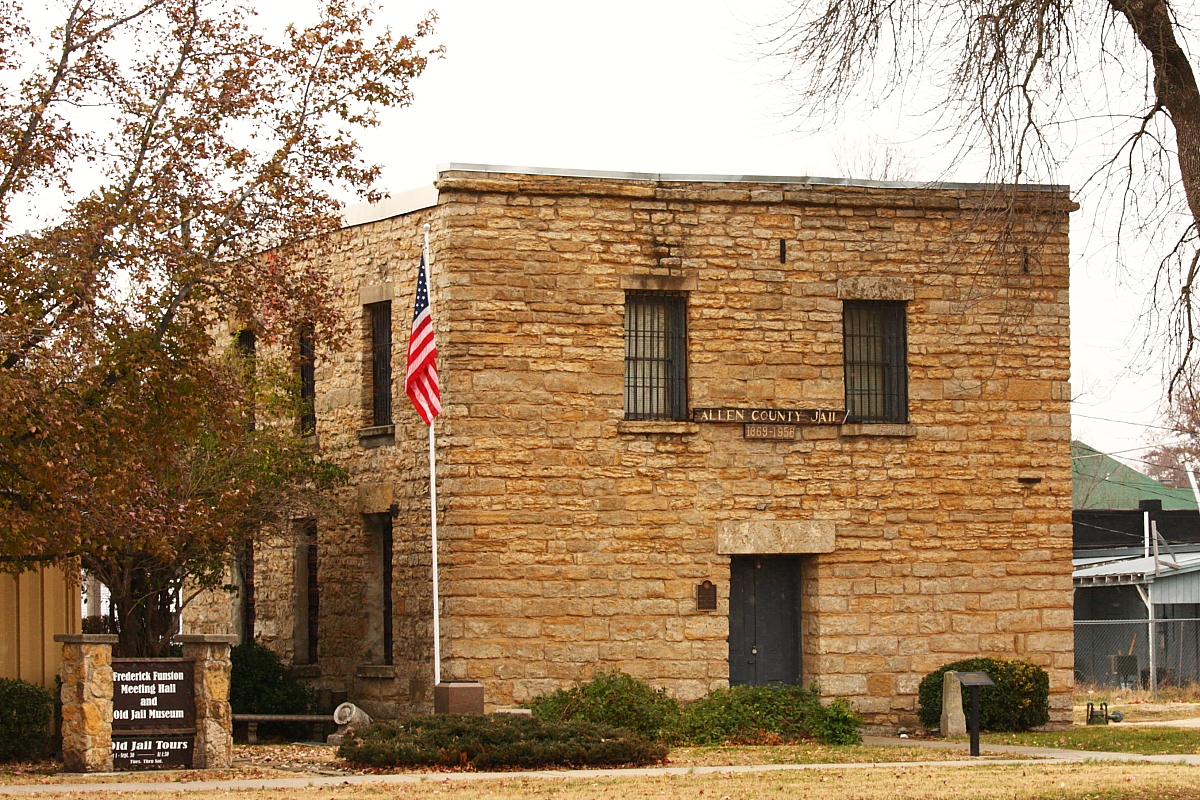
Former Allen County Jail (2008)

The history of Iola began in 1859. After the location of the county seat at Humboldt, by the legislature of 1858, there was a great deal of dissatisfaction among the residents of the central and northern parts of the county, and a number of citizens selected the present site of Iola, with the intention of ultimately securing the county seat. On January 1, 1859, a large meeting was held at the Deer Creek schoolhouse. The meeting decided to organize a town company, which was immediately done. A constitution was then adopted, and officers were elected. The officers of the company after due consideration of different points selected a site for the proposed town, about two miles (3 km) north of Cofachique, at the confluence of Elm Creek and the Neosho River. The site was owned in part by J.F. Colborn and W.H. Cochrane. The claims on two quarter-sections were bought, and were soon after surveyed into lots.

The town company worked to get the town started. A meeting was held to choose a name. Several were proposed, and the choice was determined by ballot. The name Iola, the Christian name of J.F. Colborn's wife, was proposed. As a result of the vote, this name was chosen. Meetings of the company were held every week during the first year, and efforts made to induce settlement. By the close of the year a number of lots had been disposed of, several buildings erected, and other improvements made, as all who bought lots were required to make some improvements at once. The residents of Cofachique, despairing of making their town a success, joined with Iola, and most of them moved to the new site, all working together in the endeavor to secure the location of the county seat at once.

The first building on the town site was a small log cabin owned by D.B. Bayne. Late in 1859, he built a frame house addition to it. The first building erected after the town was surveyed was a dwelling completed early in June, 1859, by J.F. Colborn, who had lived on the claim of which the town site formed a part, since 1857. On the completion of the house, Colborn and his family moved into it, thus being the first settlers in the town of Iola. The first birth in Iola was that of Luella E. Colborn.

About 1859 a stone building was built to become the town's headquarters in the event of troubles with Indians or Bushwhackers. When the Civil War erupted in 1861, the building and the block on which it stood were fortified, becoming Iola's fort. The fort served both the local militia and Army troops throughout the War.

During 1859, two stores were established by Aaron Case and James Faulkner, who had moved their buildings and goods from the old town of Cofachique, and the first hotel was opened. The post office for the neighborhood had previously been at Cofachique, and Aaron Case was Postmaster, but in October 1859, the office was removed to Iola, Case still being Postmaster, though James Faulkner attended to it, as his deputy, until he was appointed to the office a short time after. In 1860, a number of buildings were erected, and the population increased to about 150. Two more stores were opened—a dry goods store, by D.B. Bayne, and a grocery, by J.M. Cowan.

On March 26, 1860, an election was held on the re-location of the county seat, but the majority of votes were cast to keep the county seat in Humboldt. People were still dissatisfied, and for several years thereafter the county seat question entered largely into every political campaign. Much strife and bitterness of feeling was thus engendered between the two sections of the county, and harsh accusations and recriminations were the order of the day. After a number of years of strife, an election was again ordered, to take place on May 19, 1865. Having secured a majority of the votes, Iola was declared the county seat, and the records and county offices removed there at once, since which time it has remained.

City improvements in 1860 were nearly all made in the spring and early summer. In the latter part of the year the effects of the drought were so badly felt, in addition to failing to secure the county seat, that business became very dull, and for a time all of the citizens were much discouraged. In 1861 the war broke out, and as nearly every able-bodied man in Iola, as well as the county, had entered the army there was no chance for improvement; and until the close of the war, in 1865, the town grew to be no larger than it was in 1860. In 1865, after the return of the citizens from the army at the close of the war, the town began to improve steadily, and so continued until the year 1870, at which time (in March) it was incorporated as a city of the third class (bounded by State Street on the west, Irwin Street on the south, Cottonwood Street on the east, and Brooks Street (now Carpenter Street) on the north), and having secured the Leavenworth, Lawrence and Galveston Railroad, rapid strides were made for the next two years in the improvement of the town. Several manufacturing establishments were in project, and some of them were built.

Among other heavy institutions at that time, was the King Bridge Manufacturing Company, which located the Bridge shops at Iola, in 1871. For some time large numbers of men were employed, and good business was done. But with the monetary panic of 1873, the value of bonds so depreciated that the company failed, and removed its machinery. They received bonds in payment, generally, for their bridges and work, and for this reason the "crash" ruined them. The buildings and several acres of land on which they were located were sold at a Sheriff's sale for $1,100, being purchased by several citizens of Iola. The early journal of the city disappeared during the trouble with the King Iron Bridge Company, relative to the payment of the city bonds voted to that company, which caused some trouble regarding the legality of some of the ordinances and acts said to have been enacted by the first City Council. During the period 1873 to 1876, business in all branches was very poor, and little improvement in the town was made.

The Allen County Courant was the first newspaper published int Iola, and was established January 5, 1867, by W.H. Johnson. On July 27, 1868, Messrs. Talcott & Acers purchased it, and the name of the paper was changed to the Neosho Valley Register. In the following years the ownership of the paper changed five times and it was briefly renamed Kansas State Register between August 24 and December 10, 1870. On January 1, 1875, W.G. Allison & H.W. Perkins took charge and changed the paper's name to the Iola Register. The paper remained Republican under each of these different names and proprietorships.

When the county seat was located at Iola, the town company donated 100 lots to the county, to aid in the construction of public buildings. In July, 1866, bonds were voted to help raise the necessary funds, and not long after a building was purchased from George J. Eldridge, and used for county offices and all court house purposes. In 1877, a new court house, built of stone, was purchased for $1,800, and the old one was sold to the school district to use for a schoolhouse, for $500. The school was kept in two buildings, one the large two-story stone structure erected in 1868, and having an imposing appearance with its twin towers. The other building was a two-story frame, and situated just south of the stone schoolhouse.

The Allen County Jail, a strong stone structure, was built at a cost of $10,000, in county bonds, which were voted in August, 1868. The next year, the building was erected by White & Hays, at a contract price of $8,400.

In November, 1871, a tax of $5,000 was voted, to purchase and fit up a poor-farm. On February 12, 1872, a tract of land comprising 175 acres (0.71 km^{2}) was purchased of David Funkhouser, for $26 per acre, and J. W. Driscoll was appointed keeper of the poor-farm.

An economic boom from natural gas (discovered December 25, 1893) began around 1895 and resulted in a surge in population and industry. In 1910, the population had reached 9,032.

== Geography ==
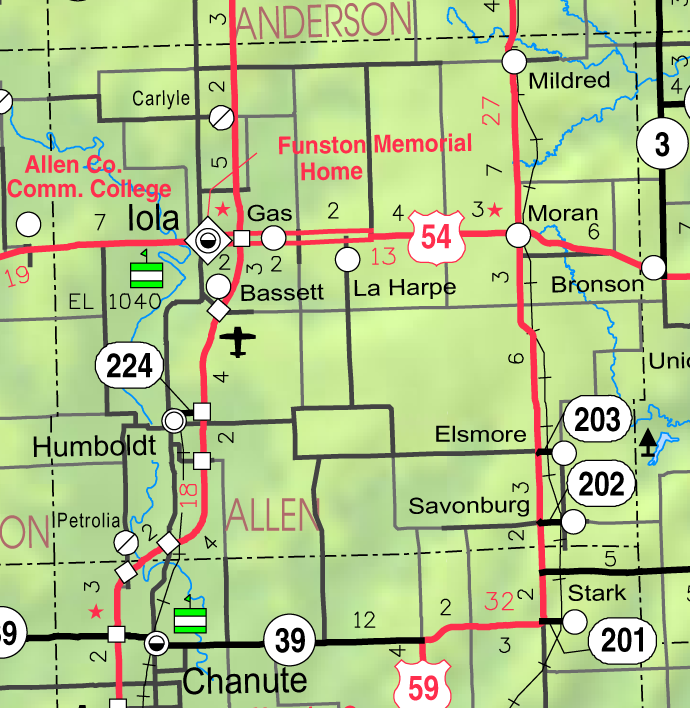
Map of Allen County

Iola is situated along the eastern bank of the Neosho River between Deer Creek, to the north, and Rock Creek, to the south, with Coon Creek flowing through the city. Important natural gas fields are in the vicinity. U.S. Route 54 passes through Iola along Madison Street and interchanges with U.S. Route 169, which passes by the east side of the city. The smaller cities of Gas and La Harpe are a few miles to the east along US-54. The tiny city of Bassett lies adjacent to Iola's southern border, and the city of Humboldt is approximately 7 miles (11 km) to the south along US-169.

According to the United States Census Bureau, the city has a total area of 4.81 square miles (12.46 km^{2}), of which 4.54 square miles (11.76 km^{2}) is land and 0.27 square miles (0.70 km^{2}) is water.

=== Climate ===
The climate in this area is characterized by hot, humid summers and generally mild to cool winters. According to the Köppen Climate Classification system, Iola has a humid subtropical climate, abbreviated "Cfa" on climate maps.

Climate data for Iola, Kansas, 1991–2020 normals, extremes 1959–present
Month	Jan	Feb	Mar	Apr	May	Jun	Jul	Aug	Sep	Oct	Nov	Dec	Year
Record high °F (°C)	74 (23)	84 (29)	88 (31)	95 (35)	96 (36)	106 (41)	109 (43)	108 (42)	105 (41)	96 (36)	83 (28)	78 (26)	109 (43)
Mean maximum °F (°C)	65.3 (18.5)	70.6 (21.4)	78.6 (25.9)	83.5 (28.6)	88.0 (31.1)	93.0 (33.9)	97.9 (36.6)	97.8 (36.6)	93.5 (34.2)	86.1 (30.1)	74.1 (23.4)	65.9 (18.8)	99.3 (37.4)
Mean daily maximum °F (°C)	41.4 (5.2)	46.8 (8.2)	56.9 (13.8)	66.5 (19.2)	74.9 (23.8)	84.1 (28.9)	88.5 (31.4)	87.8 (31.0)	80.3 (26.8)	69.3 (20.7)	56.0 (13.3)	44.3 (6.8)	66.4 (19.1)
Daily mean °F (°C)	30.9 (−0.6)	35.7 (2.1)	45.5 (7.5)	55.6 (13.1)	65.2 (18.4)	74.6 (23.7)	78.9 (26.1)	77.3 (25.2)	69.3 (20.7)	57.8 (14.3)	45.3 (7.4)	34.4 (1.3)	55.9 (13.3)
Mean daily minimum °F (°C)	20.3 (−6.5)	24.7 (−4.1)	34.2 (1.2)	44.7 (7.1)	55.5 (13.1)	65.1 (18.4)	69.2 (20.7)	66.8 (19.3)	58.3 (14.6)	46.3 (7.9)	34.5 (1.4)	24.4 (−4.2)	45.3 (7.4)
Mean minimum °F (°C)	2.4 (−16.4)	7.7 (−13.5)	16.5 (−8.6)	28.8 (−1.8)	40.4 (4.7)	53.1 (11.7)	59.3 (15.2)	55.8 (13.2)	42.5 (5.8)	29.4 (−1.4)	18.9 (−7.3)	7.3 (−13.7)	−1.7 (−18.7)
Record low °F (°C)	−16 (−27)	−24 (−31)	−1 (−18)	19 (−7)	28 (−2)	45 (7)	50 (10)	45 (7)	30 (−1)	18 (−8)	3 (−16)	−19 (−28)	−24 (−31)
Average precipitation inches (mm)	1.27 (32)	1.56 (40)	2.63 (67)	4.42 (112)	5.81 (148)	5.36 (136)	4.72 (120)	4.04 (103)	4.35 (110)	3.64 (92)	2.43 (62)	1.81 (46)	42.04 (1,068)
Average snowfall inches (cm)	2.7 (6.9)	1.1 (2.8)	1.0 (2.5)	0.0 (0.0)	0.0 (0.0)	0.0 (0.0)	0.0 (0.0)	0.0 (0.0)	0.0 (0.0)	0.0 (0.0)	0.2 (0.51)	2.4 (6.1)	7.4 (18.81)
Average precipitation days (≥ 0.01 in)	5.1	5.4	7.7	9.1	10.6	8.9	8.1	7.1	7.2	7.6	6.3	5.4	88.5
Average snowy days (≥ 0.1 in)	1.9	1.0	0.5	0.0	0.0	0.0	0.0	0.0	0.0	0.0	0.2	1.1	4.7
Source 1: NOAA
Source 2: National Weather Service

== Demographics ==
Historical population
Census	Pop.	Note	%±
1880	1,096		—
1890	1,706		55.7%
1900	5,791		239.4%
1910	9,032		56.0%
1920	8,513		−5.7%
1930	7,160		−15.9%
1940	7,244		1.2%
1950	7,094		−2.1%
1960	6,885		−2.9%
1970	6,493		−5.7%
1980	6,938		6.9%
1990	6,351		−8.5%
2000	6,302		−0.8%
2010	5,704		−9.5%
2020	5,396		−5.4%
2023 (est.)	5,318		−1.4%
U.S. Decennial Census; Kansas Population Data; 2010-2020

=== 2020 census ===
As of the 2020 census, Iola had a population of 5,396, with 2,291 households and 1,254 families. The population density was 1,208.5 per square mile (466.6/km^{2}). There were 2,679 housing units at an average density of 600.0 per square mile (231.7/km^{2}).

Of the 2,291 households, 26.6% had children under the age of 18 living in them. About 35.7% were married-couple households, 22.6% were households with a male householder and no spouse or partner present, and 33.2% were households with a female householder and no spouse or partner present. About 38.1% of all households were made up of individuals, and 17.4% had someone living alone who was 65 years of age or older. The average household size was 2.3 and the average family size was 2.9.

The median age was 37.7 years. 21.0% of residents were under age 18, 13.4% were from 18 to 24, 23.4% were from 25 to 44, 22.4% were from 45 to 64, and 19.8% were age 65 or older. For every 100 females, there were 94.9 males; for every 100 females age 18 and over, there were 91.9 males.

Of housing units, 14.5% were vacant. The homeowner vacancy rate was 3.5% and the rental vacancy rate was 12.2%. 97.8% of residents lived in urban areas, while 2.2% lived in rural areas.

Racial composition as of the 2020 census
Race	Number	Percent
White	4,681	86.7%
Black or African American	138	2.6%
American Indian and Alaska Native	75	1.4%
Asian	36	0.7%
Native Hawaiian and Other Pacific Islander	0	0.0%
Some other race	90	1.7%
Two or more races	376	7.0%
Hispanic or Latino (of any race)	270	5.0%

The non-Hispanic White share of the population was 84.71%.

Educational attainment

The 2016–2020 5-year American Community Survey estimates show that 13.6% of the population had a bachelor's degree or higher.

Income and poverty

The 2016–2020 5-year American Community Survey estimates show that the median household income was $39,107 (with a margin of error of +/- $5,420) and the median family income was $51,190 (+/- $4,565). Males had a median income of $29,063 (+/- $5,824) versus $21,881 (+/- $1,940) for females. The median income for those above 16 years old was $24,072 (+/- $4,959). Approximately, 16.7% of families and 20.8% of the population were below the poverty line, including 36.0% of those under the age of 18 and 3.1% of those ages 65 or over.

=== 2010 census ===
As of the census of 2010, there were 5,704 people, 2,357 households, and 1,418 families residing in the city. The population density was 1,256.4 inhabitants per square mile (485.1/km^{2}). There were 2,636 housing units at an average density of 580.6 per square mile (224.2/km^{2}). The racial makeup of the city was 91.4% White, 3.3% African American, 0.8% Native American, 0.6% Asian, 0.8% from other races, and 3.2% from two or more races. Hispanic or Latino of any race were 3.1% of the population.

There were 2,357 households, of which 30.3% had children under the age of 18 living with them, 40.1% were married couples living together, 13.9% had a female householder with no husband present, 6.2% had a male householder with no wife present, and 39.8% were non-families. 33.6% of all households were made up of individuals, and 14.6% had someone living alone who was 65 years of age or older. The average household size was 2.28 and the average family size was 2.86.

The median age in the city was 36 years. 23.6% of residents were under the age of 18; 12.8% were between the ages of 18 and 24; 22.8% were from 25 to 44; 23.5% were from 45 to 64; and 17.2% were 65 years of age or older. The gender makeup of the city was 47.9% male and 52.1% female.

== Culture ==
Iola hosts its annual Farm City Days in mid-October, a celebration which involves a parade and carnival. The origins of this event go back to 1971 when Stanley Dreher, Gary Parker, and Leon Catron began an effort to bring townspeople out to the farm. The purpose of the event is to show appreciation to its farm-town qualities.

== Education ==
=== Primary and secondary ===
The community is served by Iola USD 257 public school district, home of the 2006 Kansas 4A Girls State Basketball Champions.

=== Colleges and universities ===
- Allen Community College

== Transportation ==
Bus service is provided northward towards Kansas City, Missouri and southward towards Tulsa, Oklahoma by Jefferson Lines (subcontractor of Greyhound Lines).

Allen County Airport is three miles south of the city. Domestic bus and rail service have been discontinued over the years.

== Media ==
Newspapers

- Iola Register is published weekdays and Saturday. Its journalistic style is unusual among small-town newspapers for focusing on accountability.

Radio Stations

- KIKS 101.5 FM and KIOL 1370 AM are 24 hour radio stations.

== Notable people ==
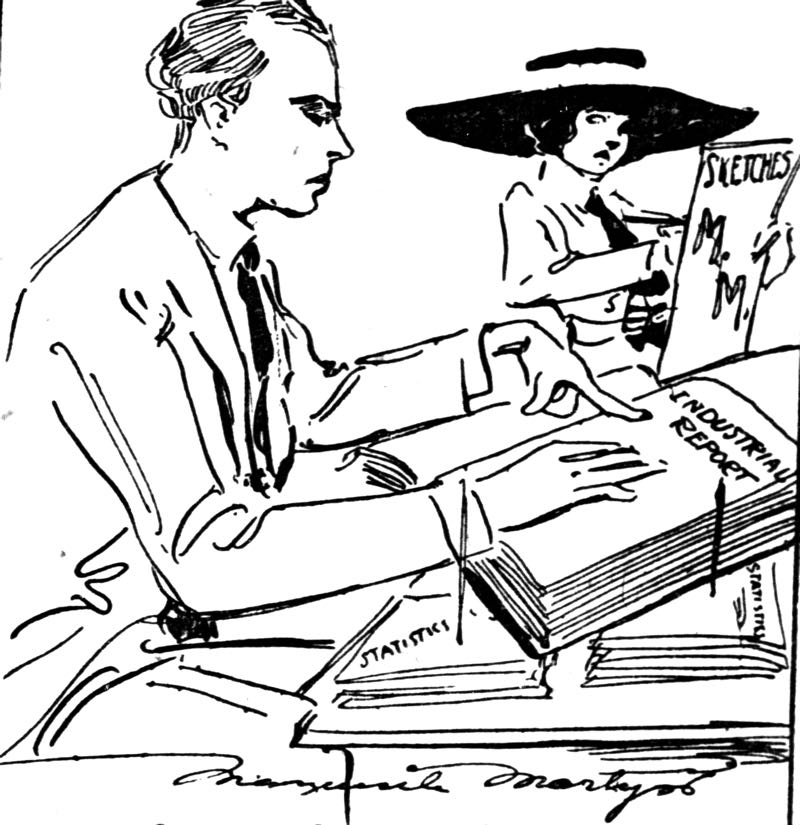
Guilford Glynn, Iola city commissioner as sketched by Marguerite Martyn, at right (1911)

- Johnny Adams, jockey and racehorse trainer, born in Carlisle, Arkansas but raised in Iola
- D. D. Crabb, rancher and Arizona State Senator
- Dean Hargrove, television producer, writer, and director, specializes in creating mystery series
- Vicki Lasseter, February 1981 Playboy Playmate of the Month
- Lila Leeds, actress, born in Iola
- Lillian Hoxie Picken, educator and textbook editor
- William Newbury, mayor of Iola in the first half of 1870, and later mayor of Portland, Oregon
- Randy Stuart, actress
- David Toland, secretary of the Kansas Department of Commerce and Lieutenant Governor of Kansas
- J. Roger Beatty, research fellow for the B. F. Goodrich company.

== See also ==
- National Register of Historic Places listings in Allen County, Kansas
- Iola High School
- Iola Gasbags
- Frederick Funston
- Great Flood of 1951
- Lehigh Portland State Park
- Prairie Spirit Trail. The southern terminus of the 53 miles (85 km) long hiking and biking trail is in Iola.
