= Prairie Spirit Trail =

Recreational trail in Kansas, US

Coordinates: 38°37′22″N 95°14′07″W

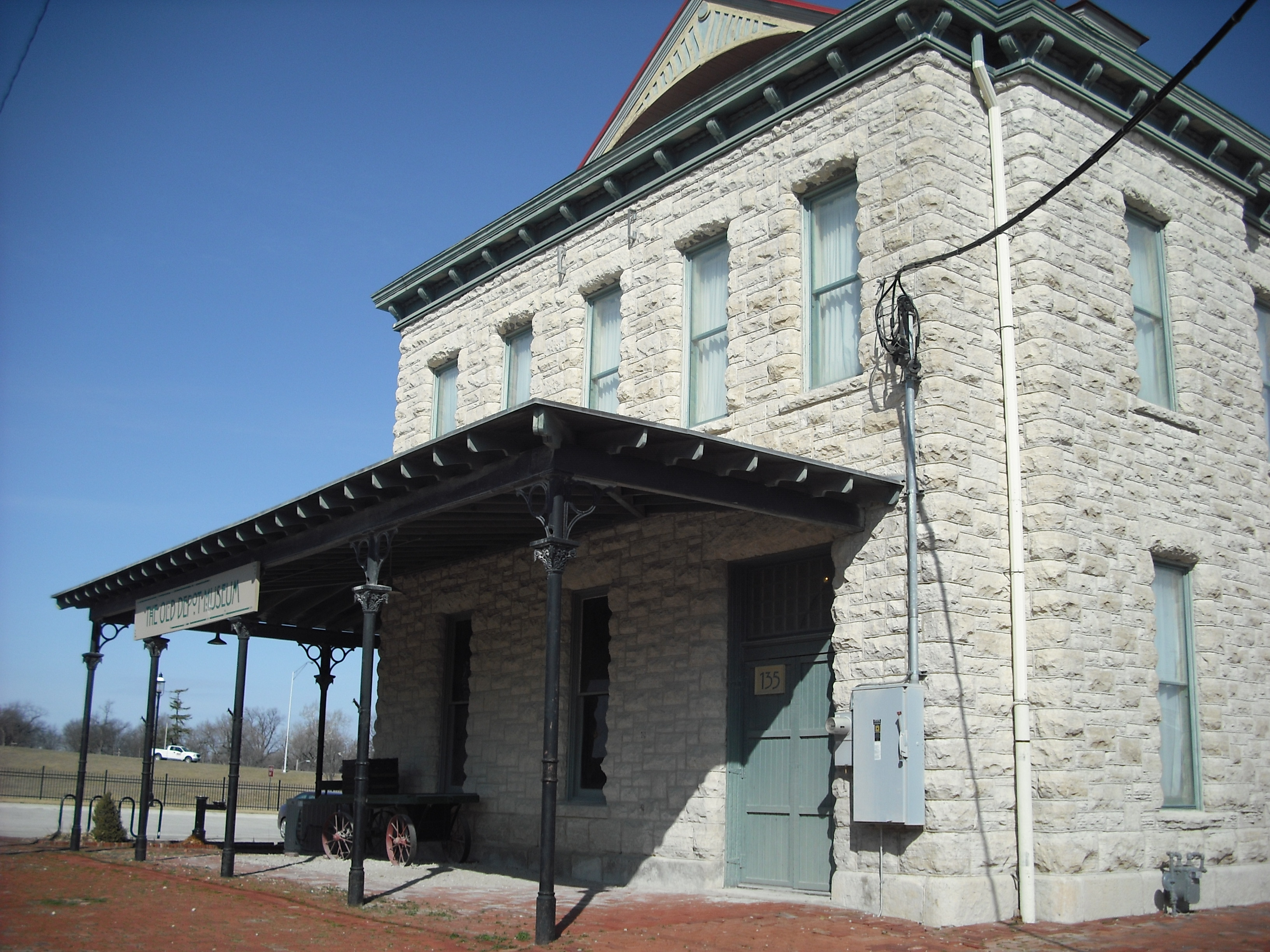
The Old Depot Museum in Ottawa is the northern terminus of the Prairie Spirit Trail.

The Prairie Spirit Trail is a hiking and biking trail and greenway in eastern Kansas. The trail is 53 miles (85 km) long and reaches from the town of Ottawa in the north to Iola in the south. It connects to the Flint Hills Trail in Ottawa. Motorized vehicles, horses, and hunting are banned on the trail which is open daily from sunrise to sunset.

== History ==
The Prairie Spirit Trail follows the former Santa Fe Railroad line from Ottawa to Iola, Kansas. The railroad was finished in 1871 and operated until the mid 1970s. In 1992 the Kansas Department of Wildlife, Parks, and Tourism acquired the former railroad line. The Trail was constructed in sections, finished in 2008, and named the Prairie Spirit Trail State Park. A citizens group, the Friends of the Prairie Spirit Trail, sponsors events and raises funds to improve the trail. In 2020, the U.S. Department of the Interior designated the Prairie Spirit Trail as a National Historic Trail. The Park office is located in Garnett.

== Description ==
The trail runs mostly through flat farming country flanked by fields of maize, wheat, and soybeans. Some parts are shaded by oak, cedar, and walnut forests or pass through pastures and native prairies. Turkey, white tail deer, and coyotes may be encountered along the trail. The Prairie Spirit Trail is multi-use and wheelchair-accessible. It is eight feet wide and surfaced with crushed limestone in rural areas and paved with asphalt in the three towns of Ottawa, Garnett, and Iola. Parking, picnic areas, restrooms, and drinking fountains are provided at many locations along the trail.

In addition to its intersection with the 91 miles (146 km) long Flint Hills Trail in Ottawa, the Maple Leaf Trail is planned to extend 15 miles (24 km) north from Ottawa to Baldwin City. Extending south from Iola is the 7 miles (11 km) long Southwind trail.
