= Osawatomie =

Osawatomie may refer to:

- Political positions of Theodore Roosevelt#New Nationalism and judicial review, Speech on August 31, 1910 at Osawatomie, Kansas, when Theodore Roosevelt announced his "New Nationalism"
- Osawatomie, Kansas
- Osawatomie High School
- Battle of Osawatomie, engagement in Bleeding Kansas struggle
- Osawatomie Brown, an 1859 play by Kate Edwards about John Brown.
- John "Osawatomie" Brown, the abolitionist.
- Osawatomie (periodical)
