= Osawatomie Brown =

1859 play by Kate Edwards

Osawatomie Brown is an 1859 play by Kate Edwards, about John Brown's attack on slave owners in Kansas, and its sequel, his raid on Harper's Ferry. The play premiered just two weeks after Brown's execution.
