= Allen County Airport =

- IATA: none; ICAO: none; FAA LID: K88

Summary
- Airport type: Public
- Owner: Allen County
- Serves: Iola, Kansas
- Elevation AMSL: 1,015 ft (309 m)
- Coordinates: 37°52′06″N 095°23′13″W
- Website: www.iola.com/k88.html
- Interactive map of Allen County Airport

Runways
Direction	Length		Surface
Direction	ft	m	Surface
1/19	5,500	1,676	Concrete

Statistics (2008)
- Aircraft operations: 16,502
- Based aircraft: 11
- Source: Federal Aviation Administration

Allen County Airport (FAA LID: K88) is a county-owned public-use airport located three nautical miles (6 km) southeast of the central business district of Iola, in Allen County, Kansas, United States.

== Facilities and aircraft ==
Allen County Airport covers an area of 340 acres (140 ha) at an elevation of 1,015 feet (309 m) above mean sea level. It has one runway designated 1/19 with a concrete surface measuring is 5,500 by 100 feet (1,676 x 30 m).

For the 12-month period ending July 25, 2008, the airport had 16,502 aircraft operations, an average of 45 per day: 97% general aviation, 3% air taxi, <1% scheduled commercial and <1% military. At that time there were 11 aircraft based at this airport: 82% single-engine and 18% multi-engine.

== See also ==
- List of airports in Kansas
