= List of Lustron houses =

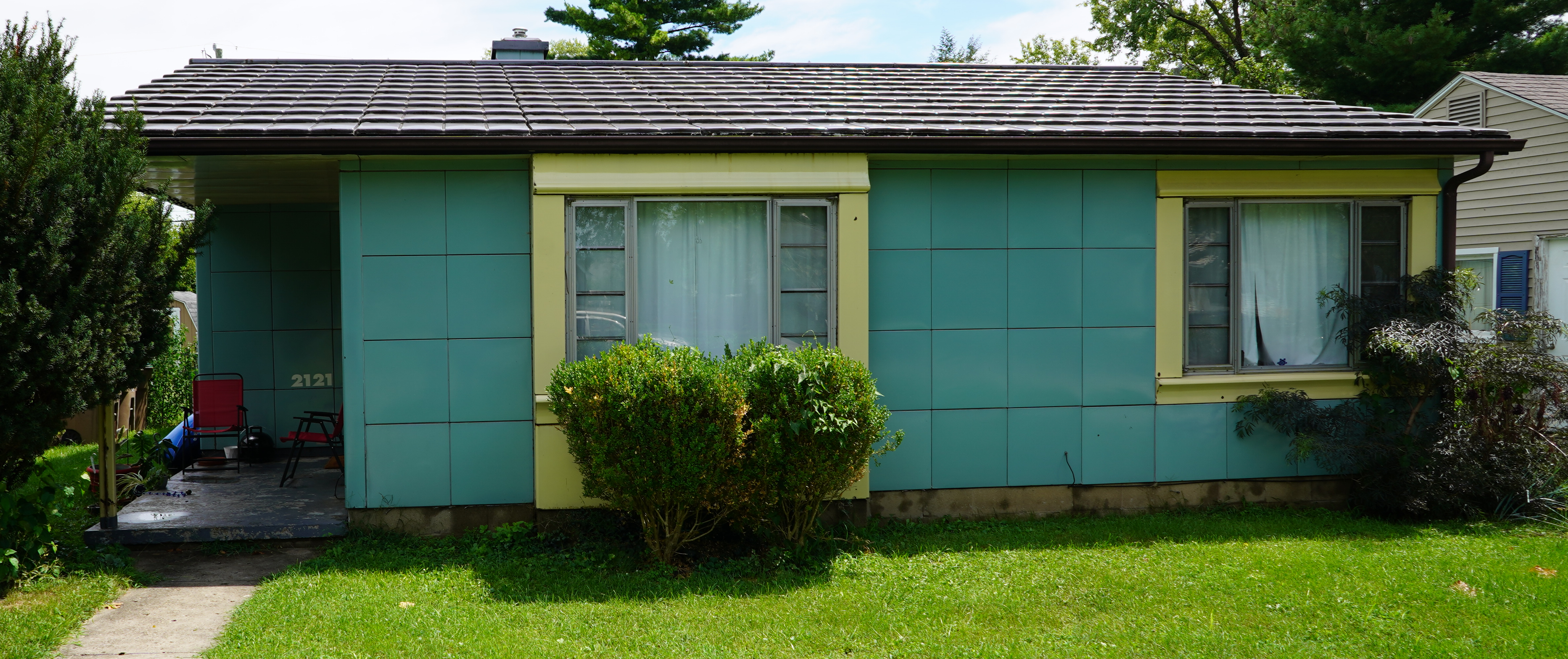
Evans Lustron House in Columbus, Indiana

This is a list of notable Lustron houses. A Lustron house is a home built using enameled metal. There were about 2500 prefabricated homes built in this manner.

Numerous Lustron houses have been listed on the National Register of Historic Places.

== Lustron houses ==
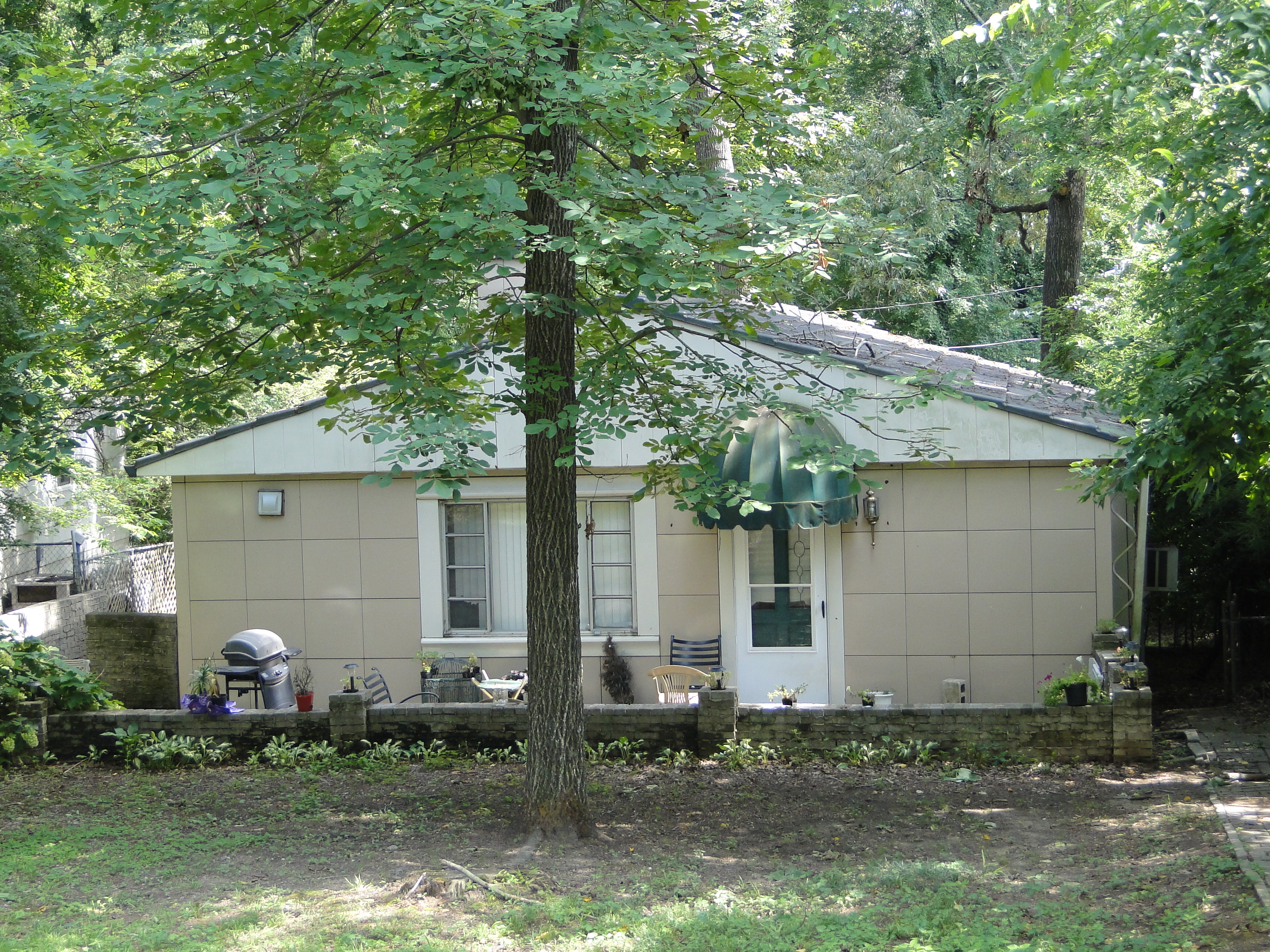
Bernice L. Wright Lustron House, Birmingham, Alabama

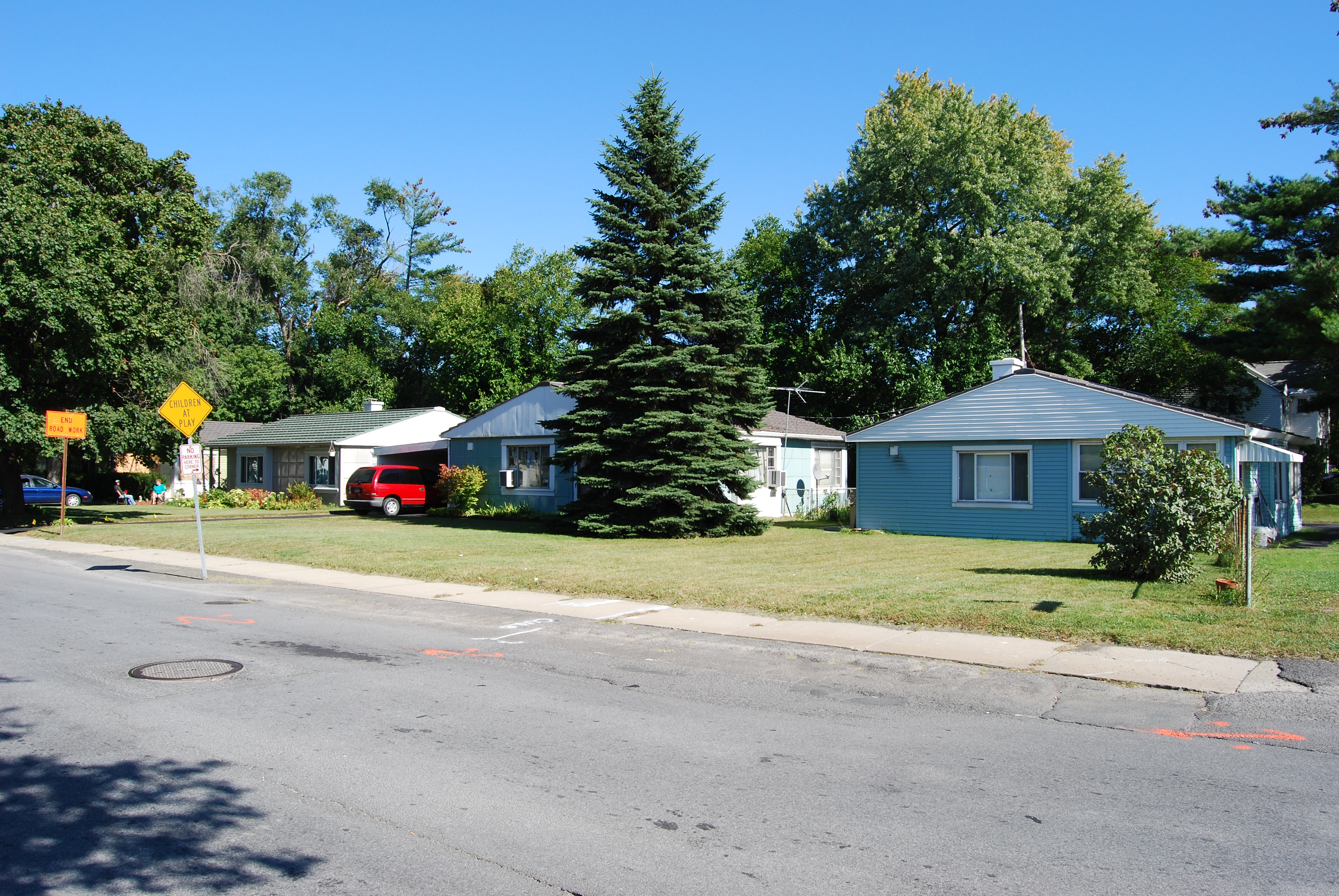
Lustron houses on Jermain Street in Albany, New York (not pictured, there is a fourth Lustron home on the opposite side of the street.)

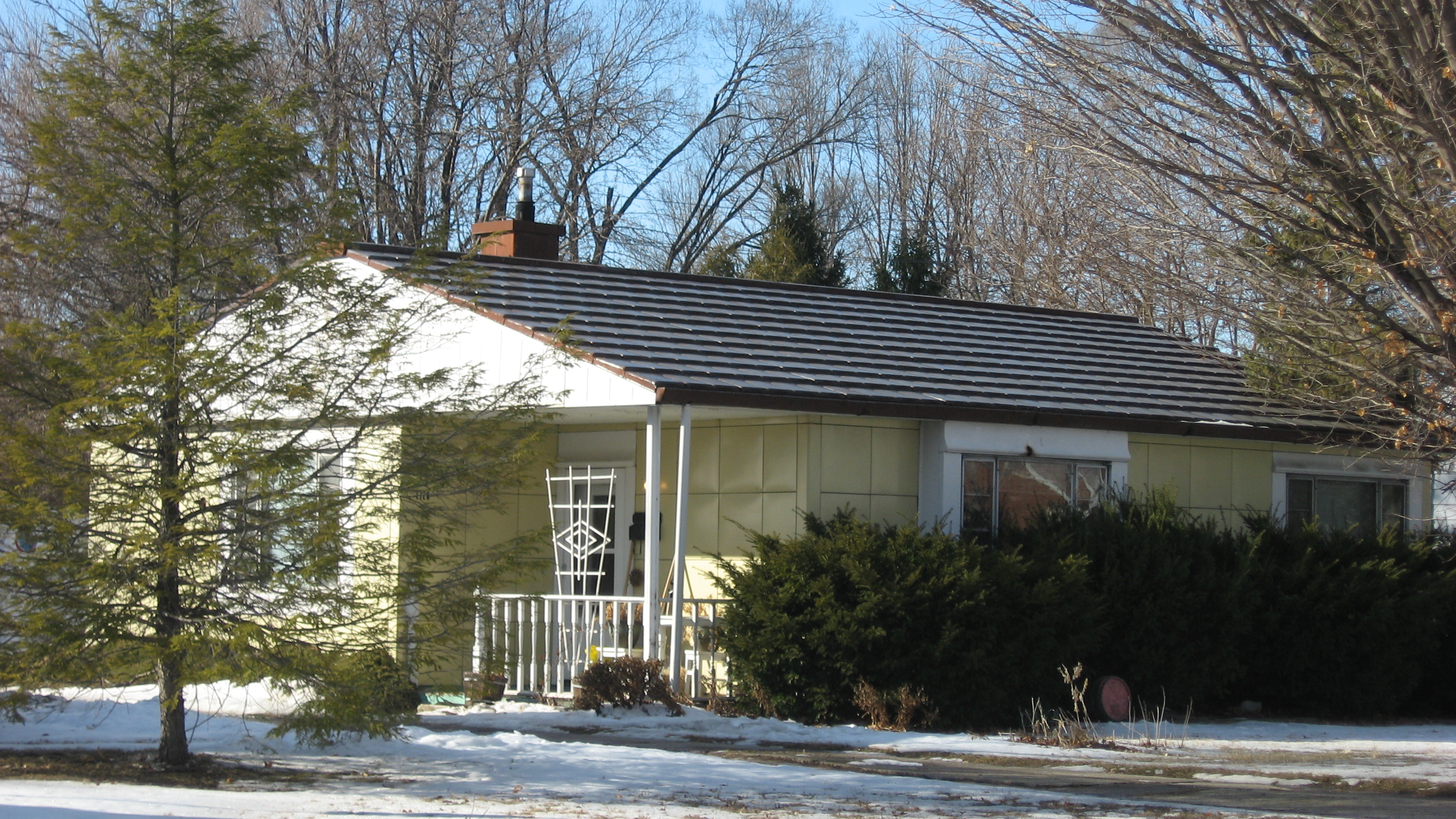
Roy and Iris Corbin Lustron House, Indianapolis, Indiana

Notable surviving Lustron houses include:

=== Alabama ===
- Lustron House on Columbiana Road, Birmingham, Alabama, listed on the National Register of Historic Places (NRHP) in Jefferson County (now demolished)
- E. H. Darby Lustron House, Florence, Alabama, NRHP-listed in Lauderdale County
- John D. and Katherine Gleissner Lustron House, Birmingham, Alabama, NRHP-listed in Jefferson County (now demolished)
- Doit W. McClellan Lustron House, Jackson, Alabama, NRHP-listed in Clarke County
- J. P. McKee Lustron House, Jackson, Alabama, NRHP-listed in Clarke County
- E. L. Newman Lustron House, Sheffield, Alabama, NRHP-listed in Colbert County
- William Bowen Lustron House, Florence, Alabama, NRHP-listed in Lauderdale County
- Bernice L. Wright Lustron House, Birmingham, Alabama, NRHP-listed in Jefferson County (now demolished)
- Margaret Quayle Lustron House, Tuscaloosa, Alabama, NRHP-listed in Tuscaloosa County

=== Arkansas ===
- Lustron House, 1302 S. Tyler, Little Rock
- Lustron House, 216 Richmond Drive, Helena-West Helena
- Mabel Vallea Lustron House, 706 Skyline Drive, North Little Rock

=== Florida ===
- Alfred and Olive Thorpe Lustron House, Fort Lauderdale, Florida, listed on the NRHP in Broward County
- Lustron House - 1011 E Crenshaw Street, Tampa, Florida
- Jack and Opalle Besser Lustron House (#1687), 1956 Rose Street, Sarasota, Florida
- Lustron House - 2201 15th Ave W, Bradenton, Florida

=== Georgia ===
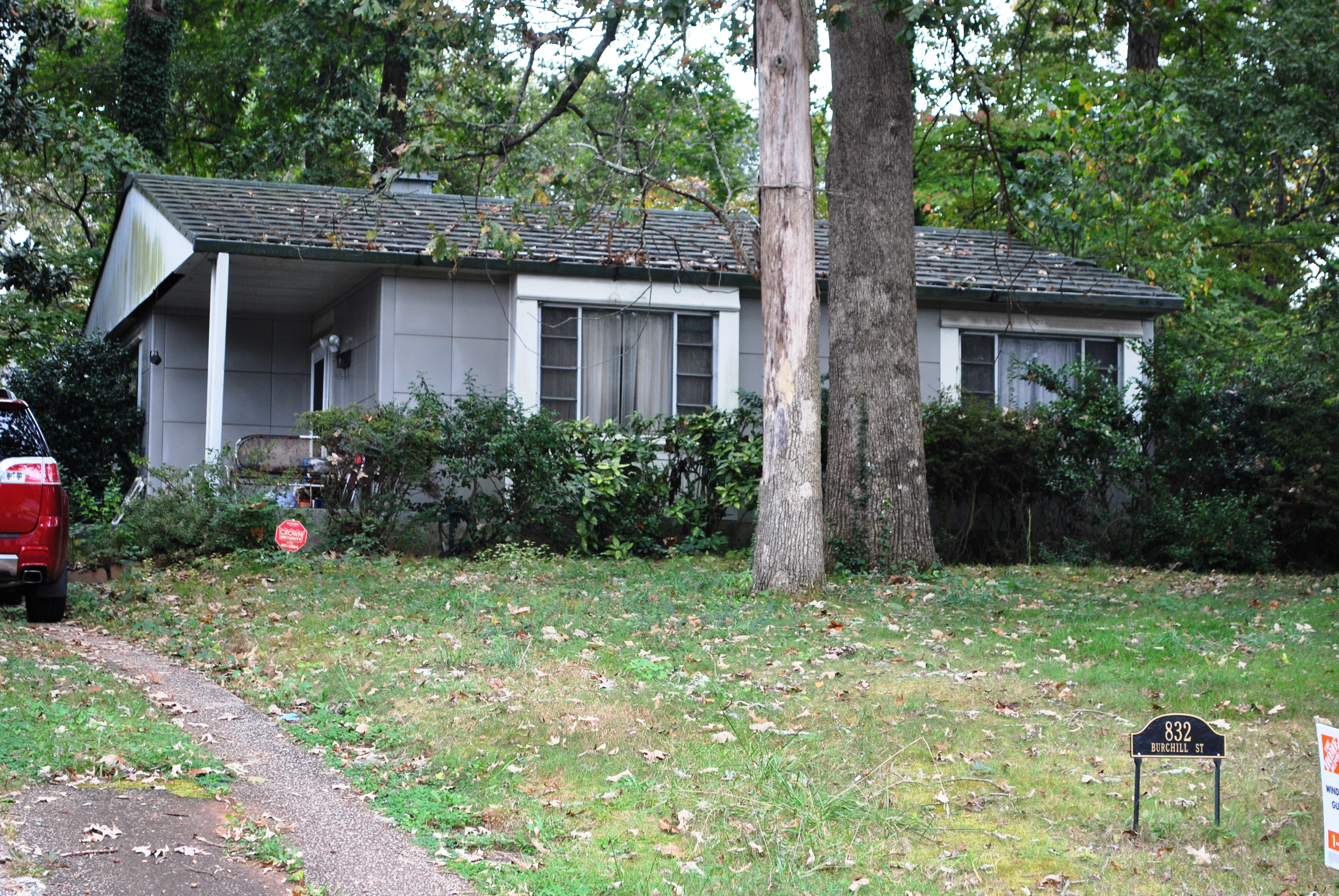
Jack and Helen Adams Lustron House, Atlanta, Georgia

- Thomas and Rae Epting Lustron House, Atlanta, Georgia, listed on the NRHP in Fulton County
- William and Ruth Knight Lustron House, Atlanta, Georgia, listed on the NRHP in Fulton County
- Jack and Helen Adams Lustron House, Atlanta, Georgia, listed on the NRHP in Fulton County
- Lustron House at 1200 Fifth Avenue, Albany, Georgia, listed on the NRHP in Dougherty County
- Lustron House at 3498 McKenzie Drive, Macon, Georgia, listed on the NRHP in Bibb County
- Lustron House at 547 Oak Avenue, Americus, Georgia, listed on the NRHP in Sumter County
- Lustron House at 711 Ninth Avenue, Albany, Georgia, listed on the NRHP in Dougherty County
- Russell and Nelle Pines Lustron House, Decatur, Georgia, once listed on the NRHP in DeKalb County
- Neville and Helen Farmer Lustron House, Decatur, Georgia, listed on the NRHP in DeKalb County

=== Illinois ===
Algonquin

- Lustron House, 1603 N. River Rd, Algonquin, IL (with garage)

Arlington Heights

- Lustron House, 836 N Dunton Ave., [Arlington Heights, Illinois] (Since torn down)

Aurora

- Lustron Houses, Rosedale Ave in Aurora, IL, at 119, 34, 32, 16 Rosedale Avenue.
- Lustron Houses, 1608 and 1702 W. Galena Blvd, Aurora IL
- Lustron House, 700 S. Union St, Aurora IL

Bedford Park

- Lustron House, 7710 W. 66th Street, Bedford Park, IL

Belleville

- Lustron House, 7825 W. Main St, Belleville, IL (Westchester Deluxe model)
- Lustron House, 600 N. 74th St, Belleville, IL

Belvidere

- Lustron House, 1039 Maple Avenue, Belvidere, IL
- Lustron House, 420 E. Madison Street, Belvidere, IL
- Lustron House, 415 N. State Street, Belvidere, IL
- Lustron House, 518 W. Boone Street, Belvidere, IL

Bloomington

- Lustron House, 1039 3 Oakland Court, Bloomington, IL

Brookfield

- Lustron House, 3201 Madison Ave., Brookfield IL

Champaign-Urbana

- Lustron House, Model 02, Serial number 01391, 1011 W Hill St., Champaign, IL
- Lustron House, 1213 W Daniel St., Champaign, IL
- Lustron House, 1201 W Green St., Champaign, IL
- Lustron House, 1109 W Clark St., Champaign, IL
- Lustron House, 504 S Lincoln, Ave., Urbana, IL, original house with an addition of two bedrooms and another bathroom
- Lustron House, 110 S Glover St., Urbana, IL
- Lustron House, 302 Elwood Dr., Champaign IL

Danville

- Lustron House, 1657 N Gilbert St., Danville, IL
- Lustron House, 211 Dodge Ave, Danville, IL

Des Plaines

- Lustron House, 2040 Laura Ln, Des Plaines, IL

Geneva

- Lustron House, 432 Austin Ave., Geneva, IL

German Valley

- Lustron House, 44 Stephenson St, German Valley, IL

Havana

- Lustron House, 626 E. Laurel Avenue, Havana, IL

Highland

- Lustron House, 717 Poplar St, Highland, IL
- Lustron House, 1423 Laurel St. Highland, IL

Jacksonville

- Lustron House, SW Corner North Laurel Dr and Hardin Ave, Jacksonville, IL (with garage)

Leland

- Lustron House, Model 03, 230 N. Cedar Street, Leland, IL

Lincolnshire

- Stonegate Circle in Lincolnshire, IL is a largely intact neighborhood of Lustron homes.

Litchfield

- Lustron House, 310 N. Montgomery, Litchfield, IL

Lombard

- Lustron House, 39 S. Westmore-Meyers Rd, Lombard, IL
- Lustron House, 305 E. Morningside Ave, Lombard, IL
- Lustron House, 454 S. Edgewood Ave, Lombard, IL
- Lustron House, 504 S. Edgewood Ave, Lombard, IL (updated with composite roof, vinyl siding, and new windows)
- Lustron House, 1127 E Division St, Lombard, IL
- Lustron House, 257 East Madison St, Lombard, IL
- Lustron House, 321 East Madison St, Lombard, IL
- Lustron House, 243 North Garfield St, Lombard, IL
- Lustron House, 247 North Garfield St, Lombard, IL

Macomb

- Lustron House, 537 S. Dudley St, Macomb, IL
- Lustron House, 309 S. Edwards, Macomb, IL

McHenry

- Lustron House, 2423 Mogra Dr., McHenry, IL

Mendota

- Lustron House, 1007 Michigan Ave, Mendota, IL

Palatine

- Lustron House, 129 S Hale St, Palatine, IL (the one next door has been torn down)
- Lustron House, 221 S Bothwell St, Palatine, IL
- Lustron House, 253 S Bothwell St, Palatine, IL
- Lustron House, 325 S Hale St, Palatine, IL (now demolished)

Peotone

- Lustron House, 216 N. Second St, Peotone, IL

Princeton

- Lustron House, 1029 S Fifth St., Princeton, IL
- Lustron House, S. Chestnut St., Princeton, IL
- Lustron House, E. Thompson St., Princeton, IL

Rockford

- Lustron Home, 3516 Carolina Ave. Rockford, IL
- Lustron House, 2024 Kilburn Ave, Rockford, IL
- Lustron House, 2021 Kilburn Ave, Rockford, IL
- Lustron House, 1620 26th St, Rockford, IL
- Lustron House, 2028 Idaho Pkwy, Rockford, IL (with garage) Maize Yellow
- Lustron House, 1908 Ohio Pkwy, Rockford, IL (with garage)
- Lustron House, 1625 Oregon Ave, Rockford, IL (with garage)
- Lustron House, 1905 Oregon Ave., Rockford, IL (homes exterior has been redone in brick and interior has been altered)
- Lustron House, 3208 West Gate Pkwy, Rockford, IL (with garage)

Salem

- Lustron House, 400 block of Indiana Ave, Salem, IL

Skokie

- Lustron House, 8557 Central Park Ave., Skokie, IL

Springfield

- Lustron House, 2424 S. Pasfield, Springfield, IL
- Lustron House, 2327 S. Pasfield, Springfield, IL
- Lustron House, 2517 S. State St, Springfield, IL

Sycamore

- Lustron House, 942 Dekalb Ave., Sycamore, IL

West Chicago

- Lustron House, 109 E. York Ave., West Chicago, IL

Wilmette

- Lustron House, 2545 Lake Avenue, Wilmette, IL

Yorkville

- Lustron House, South Main Street at West Dolph Street, Yorkville, IL

=== Indiana ===
- Lustron House, 3121 N National Rd, Columbus, IN
- Lustron House, 115 E Commerce Street, Brownstown, IN
- Lustron House, 729 Lake Front Drive, Beverly Shores, La Porte County, IN
- Lustron House, Beverly Shores, Porter County, IN (previously at 103 Lake Front Drive, Beverly Shores).
- Lustron House, 104 State Park Road, Beverly Shores, Porter County, IN
- Lustron House, 115 DeWolfe St, Michigan City, La Porte County, IN
- Lustron House, 222 N Carroll Ave, Michigan City, La Porte County, IN
- Lustron House, Stephens Street, Chesterton, Porter County, IN (previously at 204 Lake Front Drive, Beverly Shores, Porter County, IN)
- Norris and Harriet Coambs Lustron House, Chesterton, Indiana, listed on the NRHP in Porter, Indiana
- Roy and Iris Corbin Lustron House, Indianapolis, Indiana, listed on the NRHP in Marion County
- Lustron House, 707 Ohio Ave., Auburn, IN, DeKalb County
- Lustron House, 909 N. Van Buren St., Auburn, IN, DeKalb County
- Lustron House, 208 Oak St., Wilkinson, IN, Hancock County
- Lustron House, 18689 Lane St. Crown Point, IN.
- Lustron House, 1319 US-30 Schererville, IN (torn down around 2020.)
- Lustron House, 7423 Woodmar Ave. Hammond.
- Lustron House, 2047 169th St. Hammond.
- Lustron House, 114 N. Indiana St. Remington.
- Lustron House, 504 Willow St. Rising Sun.
- Lustron House, 168 SW 13th St. Richmond.
- Lustron House, 3228 Avon Lane Richmond.
- Lustron House, 3240 Berwyn Lane Richmond.
- Lustron House, 4601 South Washington St., Marion, Grant County, IN
- Lustron House, 318 East 7th St., Marion, Grant County, IN
- Lustron House (with wood framed addition), 1320 North Wabash Ave., Marion, Grant County, IN
- Lustron House, 909 West Sixth St., Marion, Grant County, IN
- Lustron House, 3501 South Galletin St., Marion, Grant County, IN
- Lustron House, 4105 Webster St, Fort Wayne, Allen County, IN
- Lustron House, 316 West Fleming Ave., Fort Wayne, Allen County, IN
- Lustron House, 3214 Parnell Ave., Fort Wayne, Allen County, IN
- Lustron House, 1447 Michigan Rd, Madison
- Lustron House, 5638 Indianaola Ave, Indianapolis
- Lustron House, 216 S 10th Ave, Beech Grove
- Lustron House, 1029 N. Hawthorne Lane, Indianapolis Winchester Deluxe 02, two car garage.
- Evans Lustron House, 2121 Pennsylvania Street, Columbus, Bartholomew County. National Register of Historic Places listings in Bartholomew County, Indiana|listed on the NRHP in Columbus, Indiana
- Lustron House, Leland Ave, Indianapolis, IN 46218
- Lustron House, 5070 W 11th St, Speedway, IN 46224
- Lustron House, 1908 Kessler Blvd. East Drive, Indianapolis, IN 46220
- Lustron House, 1920 Kessler Blvd, South Bend, IN 46616
- Lustron House, 6466 Central Ave, Indianapolis, IN 46220
- Lustron House, 6321 Central Ave, Indianapolis, IN 46220
- Lustron House, 6212 Central Ave, Indianapolis, IN 46220
- Lustron House, 6435 River View, Indianapolis, IN
- Lustron House, 6546 Paradise Lane, Indianapolis, IN 46236 (Oaklandon/Lawrence)
- Lustron House, 1627 S Mulberry St, Muncie, IN 47302

Lustron House, 49 Maple St, Danville, IN 46122

- Lustron House, 431 N Broadway St, Peru, IN 46970
- Lustron House, 1729 W 11th St, Anderson, IN 46016. Madison County

=== Iowa ===
- Lustron House - 2048 Avalon Rd, Dubuque, Iowa
- Lustron House - 501 Court St, Bellevue, Iowa
- Lustron House - moved to 245 Penn St, Carlisle, Iowa
- Lustron Home No. 02102 - 2009 Williams Blvd. SW, Cedar Rapids, Iowa NRHP-listed in Linn County.
- Lustron House - 433 Dunreath Drive NE Cedar Rapids, Iowa
- Lustron House - 708 11th Ave, Coralville, Iowa
- Lustron House - 3706 53rd St, Des Moines, Iowa
- Lustron House - 4343 Chamberlain, Des Moines, Iowa
- Lustron House - 927 N 3rd St, Fort Dodge, Iowa
- Lustron House - 1460 South Grandview Ave, Dubuque, Iowa
- Lustron House - 514 Cooper Pl, Dubuque, Iowa
- Lustron House - 209 NE Jacob St, Grimes, Iowa
- Lustron House - 508 Federal St. South, Hampton, Iowa
- Lustron House - 609 West Salem St, Indianola, Iowa
- Lustron House - 13796 Highway 65/69, Indianola, Iowa
- Glenn and Nell Kurtz Lustron Home and Garage - 2017 Washington Ave, Iowa Falls, Iowa, NRHP-listed in Hardin County.
- Lustron House - 627 D St, Iowa City, Iowa
- Lustron House - 705 Clark St, Iowa City, Iowa
- Lustron House - 805 Melrose Ave, Iowa City, Iowa
- Lustron House - 1815 E. Court St. Iowa City, Iowa
- Lustron House - Minnesota St, Meservey, Iowa
- Lustron House - 903 Elm Ave, Norwalk, Iowa
- Lustron House - 102 E. Main St, Ossian, Iowa
- Lustron House - 1356 Main St, Pella, Iowa
- Lustron House - 400 East St, Tipton, Iowa
- Lustron House - 2020 W. 3rd St., Waterloo, Iowa
- Lustron House - 222 Kenilworth Rd, Waterloo, Iowa
- Lustron House - 249 Kenilworth Rd, Waterloo, Iowa
- Lustron House - 225 Cornwall Ave, Waterloo, Iowa
- Lustron House No. 02437 - 1440 63rd Street, Windsor Heights, Iowa NRHP-listed in Polk County
- Lustron House - 2826 38th St, Des Moines, Iowa
- Lustron House - 5827 Kingman Ave, Des Moines, Iowa
- Lustron House - 1623 Pine St, Burlington, Iowa
- Lustron House - 1737 Pine St, Burlington, Iowa
- Lustron House - 1809 Mason Rd, Burlington, Iowa
- Lustron House - 2223 S Main St, Burlington, Iowa
- Lustron House - 2608 Sunnyside Ave, Burlington, Iowa
- Lustron House - 299 Washington St, Lake City, Iowa
- Lustron House with Garage - 1669 Beaver Ave, Des Moines, Iowa
- Lustron House with Garage - 1703 Beaver Ave, Des Moines, Iowa
- Harold and Lucille Jones Lustron House - 415 S. Main St., Sigourney, Iowa
- Lustron House - 306 South Brown Ave, Graettinger, Iowa
- Lustron House - 1832 Avenue D, Fort Madison, Iowa

=== Kansas ===
- Berger House - 208 NE 12th St., Abilene, Kansas, listed on the NRHP in Dickinson County, KS
- Stein House - 420 Cedar St., Ashland, Kansas, listed on the NRHP in Clark County, KS
- Lustron House - 804 4th Ave., Dodge City, Kansas
- Lustron House - 617 Lincoln Street, Emporia, Kansas
- Lustron House - 405 N. 4th St., Garden City, Kansas
- Lustron House - 407 East Laurel, Garden City, Kansas
- Abel House - 2601 Paseo Dr., Great Bend, Kansas, listed on the NRHP in Barton County, KS
- Nagel House - 1411 Wilson St., Great Bend, Kansas, listed on the NRHP in Barton County, KS
- Lustron House - 1307 Coolidge St., Great Bend, Kansas
- Lustron House - 1310 Coolidge St., Great Bend, Kansas
- Lustron House - 1301 Harding St., Great Bend, Kansas
- Lustron House - 3410 Broadway, Great Bend, Kansas
- Weeks Lustron House - Barton County Historical Society, Great Bend, Kansas
- Drees House - 100 E 19th St., Hays, Kansas, listed on the NRHP in Ellis County, KS
- Lustron House - 103 W 20th St., Hays, Kansas
- Lustron House - 308 E 20th St., Hays, Kansas
- Gallagher House - 310 E 20th St., Hays, Kansaslisted on the NRHP in Ellis County, KS
- Lustron House - 400 E 20th St., Hays, Kansas
- McFadden House - 315 W 5th St., Holton, Kansas, listed on the NRHP in Jackson County, KS
- Lustron House - 21 E 27th Ave., Hutchinson, Kansas
- Lustron House - 1124 Toles Ave., Larned, Kansas
- Lustron House - 612 Mann Ave., Larned, Kansas
- Lustron House - 505 W 5th St., Larned, Kansas
- Ooten House - 507 W 15th St., Larned, Kansas, listed on the NRHP in Pawnee County, KS
- Lustron House - 721 Martin Ave., Larned, Kansas
- Patterson House - 841 W 8th St., Larned, Kansas, listed on the NRHP in Pawnee County, KS
- Lustron House - 823 Starks Dr., Larned, Kansas
- Lustron House - 1421 State St., Larned, Kansas
- Lustron House - 740 Thornton St., Leavenworth, Kansas
- Lustron House - 223 North Iowa, Ness City, Kansas
- Coleman House - 408 Mead St., Newton, Kansas, listed on the NRHP in Harvey County, KS
- Mann House 614 Oakdale, Russell, Kansas, listed on the NRHP in Russell County, KS
- Woelk House 615 Sunset, Russell, Kansas, listed on the NRHP in Russell County, KS
- Grimes House - 214 Park St., Smith Center, Kansas, listed on the NRHP in Smith County, KS
- Martyn House - 216 Park St., Smith Center, Kansas, listed on the NRHP in Smith County, KS
- Lustron House - 3505 SW 10th St., Topeka, Kansas
- Stradal House - 409 N. 13th St., Wakeeney, Kansas, listed on the NRHP in Trego County, KS
- Weinhold House - 2315 Ave C, Wilson, Kansas, listed on the NRHP in Ellsworth County, KS
- Lustron House - 4621 Lloyd St., Kansas City, Kansas

=== Kentucky ===
Kentucky boasts some 37 remaining examples of Lustron houses. These homes were said to "provide new and richer experiences for the whole family, where mother has far more hours, youngsters have far fewer worries, and far more leisure for dad."

http://www.lustronpreservation.org/lustron-library

- Lustron House - 956 Collins Ln, Frankfort, Kentucky. A Westchester Deluxe model in Dove Grey color.
- Lustron House - 493 Park St W, Guthrie, Kentucky.
- Stewart House - 827 S. Green St, Henderson, Kentucky. Listed on the NRHP in Henderson County.
- Lustron House - 2423 West Cumberland Avenue, Middlesboro, Kentucky Google Map - Near Corner of South 24th Street
- Lustron House - 2428 West Cumberland Avenue, Middlesboro, Kentucky Google Map - Corner of North 25th Street
- Lustron House - 1920 Winston Avenue, Louisville, Kentucky
- Lustron House - 1922 Winston Avenue, Louisville, Kentucky
- Lustron House - 1911 Gladstone Avenue, Louisville, Kentucky
- Lustron House - 2827 Eleanor Avenue, Louisville, Kentucky
- Lustron House - 113 E. Adair St, Owenton, Kentucky. (Replaced at some point between April 2023 and November 2024)
- Lustron House - 17 Lyndale Road, Edgewood, Kentucky

=== Louisiana ===
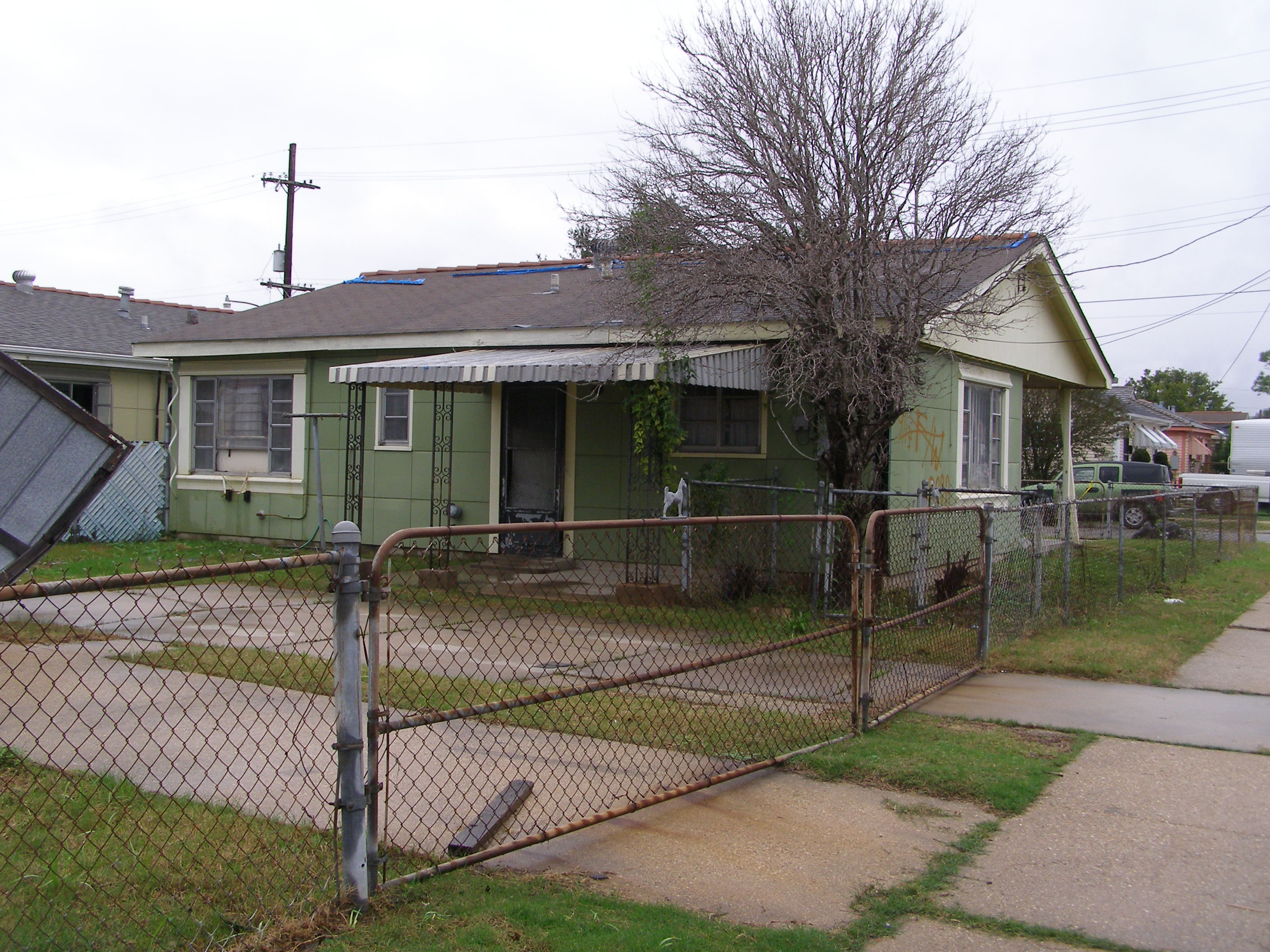
Lustron house in Hollygrove, New Orleans with post-Hurricane Katrina search & rescue marking. The exterior has since been painted over.

- Lustron House - 110 Hudson, Pineville, Louisiana
- Lustron House - Huber Park section of Lake Charles, Louisiana

==== New Orleans ====
Over a dozen Lustron houses known to have been constructed in New Orleans, about half still existed as of February 2019, some in substantially altered condition. All documented Lustron houses erected in New Orleans were Winchester models. A possibly unique "double bungalow" constructed of two Lustron houses joined together is located at 9412-14 Stroelitz Street.

- Lustron House - 128 Central Park Place, New Orleans, Louisiana
- Lustron House - 3700 Cherry Street, New Orleans, Louisiana
- Lustron House - 3704 Cherry Street, New Orleans, Louisiana
- Lustron House - 3629 Livingston Street, New Orleans, Louisiana - stuccoed over in late 2000's
- Lustron House - 3635 Livingston Street, New Orleans, Louisiana
- Lustron House - 9412-14 Stroelitz Street, New Orleans, Louisiana - Double constructed of two joined Lustron Houses
- Julius Reese Residence - 4940 St. Roch Avenue, New Orleans, Louisiana
- Lustron House - 41 Wren Street, New Orleans, Louisiana - demolished late 2019

=== Maryland ===
- Lustron House - 4811 Harvard Road, College Park, MD 20740
- Lustron House - 5819 Black Hawk Drive, Forest Heights, MD 20745
- Lustron House - 5618 Woodland Drive, Forest Heights, MD 20745

=== Massachusetts ===
- Lustron House - 692 Salem St, Groveland, Massachusetts
- Lustron House - 22 Payson Rd, Brookline, Massachusetts
- Lustron House - 59 Chellman St, West Roxbury, Massachusetts (heavily damaged by fire on September 29, 2018, now demolished)
- Lustron House - 4 North St. Greenfield, Massachusetts
- Lustron House - 316 S Mountain Rd, Pittsfield, Massachusetts
- Lustron House - 42 Rhode Island Ave, Pittsfield, Massachusetts
- Lustron House - 21 Perrine Ave, Pittsfield, Massachusetts
- Lustron House - 40 New Lenox Rd, Lenox, Massachusetts
- Lustron House - 8 Gilmore Ave, Great Barrington, Massachusetts

=== Michigan ===
- Lustron House - 654 Ashland Street, Detroit, MI 48215
- Lustron House - 903 E Michigan Ave, Paw Paw, MI 49079
- Lustron House - 304 Center Street, Dowagiac, MI 49047
- Lustron House - 305 Courtland Street, Dowagiac, MI 49047
- Lustron House - 2262 Lake Dr SE, East Grand Rapids, MI 49506
- Lustron House - 1849 Philadelphia Ave SE, Grand Rapids, MI 49507
- Lustron House - 255 Bedford Rd. N., Battle Creek, Michigan
- Lustron House - 147 Chesnut Street, Battle Creek, Michigan
- Lustron House - 3060 Lakewood Drive, Ann Arbor, Michigan
- Lustron House - 605 Linda Vista, Ann Arbor, Michigan
- Lustron Houses - 1121, 1125, 1129 Bydding, Ann Arbor, Michigan
- Lustron House - 1711 Chandler, Ann Arbor, Michigan
- Lustron House - 800 Starwick, Ann Arbor, Michigan
- Lustron House - 1910 Longshore, Ann Arbor, Michigan
- Lustron House - 1200 S Seventh, Ann Arbor, Michigan
- Lustron House - 2524 Martin Ave. SE, Grand Rapids, Michigan
- Lustron House - 1009 Clover, Kalamazoo, Michigan (Newport Model 023)
- Lustron House - 1421 Olmstead Road, Kalamazoo, Michigan
- Lustron House - 2022 Lakeway, Kalamazoo, Michigan
- Lustron House - 23420 Oneida St. Oak Park, Michigan
- Lustron House - 23440 Oneida St. Oak Park, Michigan
- Lustron House - 2764 Oakwood N.E. Grand Rapids, Michigan

=== Minnesota ===
- Lustron House - 1007 6th Ave SW, Austin, Minnesota 55912
- Lustron House - 4900 Cedar Ave, Minneapolis, Minnesota 55417
- Lustron House - 4916 Cedar Ave, Minneapolis, Minnesota 55417
- Lustron House - 2436 Mt View Ave, Minneapolis, Minnesota 55405
- Lustron House - 5009 Nicollet Ave, Minneapolis, Minnesota 55419
- Lustron House - 5014 Nicollet Ave, Minneapolis, Minnesota 55419
- Lustron House - 5021 Nicollet Ave, Minneapolis, Minnesota 55419
- Lustron House - 5027 Nicollet Ave, Minneapolis, Minnesota 55419
- Lustron House - 5047 Nicollet Ave, Minneapolis, Minnesota 55419
- Lustron House - 5055 Nicollet Ave, Minneapolis, Minnesota 55419
- Lustron House - 5217 S 31st Ave, Minneapolis, Minnesota 55417
- Lustron House - 118 Iowa St, Minnesota City, Minnesota 55959
- Lustron House - 3959 Yates Ave N, Robbinsdale, Minnesota 55422
- Lustron House - 733 13th Ave NE, Rochester, Minnesota 55906
- Lustron House - 2820 Roosevelt St NE, St Anthony, Minnesota 55418
- Lustron House - 1270 10th Ave N, St Cloud, Minnesota 56303
- Lustron House - 312 2nd St SW, Wadena, Minnesota 56482
- Lustron House - 718 Mankato Ave, Winona, Minnesota 55987

=== Missouri ===
There are a number of Lustron houses located in Brentwood. Many of them are original and many of them have been sided, have additions, or have had the windows replaced with vinyl. There are also 3 in St. Charles, Missouri that are all owned by the same owner, and one next to I-70 in Wentzville. There is also one in Velda Village Missouri and two in St. Louis City on McDonald in the Tower Grove South neighborhood, No. 00804.

There are also 5 Lustron homes in the Kansas City area near 85th and Wornall Road. One of them was the display model and residence of the local sales representative. Local legend says that the salesman came home one day and told his wife that he no longer had a job because the company was bankrupt, but they still had their house.

In Kansas City there are at least 10 or more. This includes the Kansas City suburbs. In south Kansas City there are at least 6 in a mile radius. Three together on one street. Two are found north of Kansas City in Cameron.

- Lustron House - 2401 Annalee Ave., Brentwood, Missouri
- Lustron House - 407 W Spring St, Boonville, Missouri
- Lustron House - 409 West 3rd St., Cameron, Missouri
- Lustron House - 528 South Walnut St., Cameron, Missouri
- Lustron House - 149 Ozark Drive, Crystal City, MO 63019
- Lustron House - 930 Lindsay Lane, Florissant, Missouri
- Lustron House - W 16th St. & HWY 100 Hermann, Missouri
- Lustron House - 3534 Oak Ridge Drive, Joplin, Missouri
- Lustron House - 1270 South Salt Pond Avenue; Marshall, Missouri
- Lustron House - 1271 South Salt Pond Avenue; Marshall, Missouri
- Lustron House - 1060 South Redman Avenue; Marshall, Missouri
- Lustron House - State Highway E, St. Francois Township, Missouri 37°29'36.5"N 90°26'28.1"W
- Lustron House - 4848 Germania Ave. St. Louis, MO 63116
- Lustron House - 208 W Old Watson Rd., Webster Groves, Missouri
- Lustron House - 101 Eldridge Ave., Webster Groves, Missouri
- Lustron House - 121 Eldridge Ave., Webster Groves, Missouri
- Lustron House - 124 Eldridge Ave., Webster Groves, Missouri
- Lustron House - 125 Eldridge Ave., Webster Groves, Missouri
- Lustron House - 324 Hazel Ave., Webster Groves, Missouri
- Lustron House - 330 Hazel Ave., Webster Groves, Missouri
- Lustron House - 505 Ridge Ave., Webster Groves, Missouri
- Lustron House - 441 S. Maple Ave., Webster Groves, Missouri
- Lustron House - 1950 W Pearce Blvd, Wentzville, MO 63385
- Lustron House - 8432 Jarboe St., Kansas City, Missouri
- Lustron House - 8436 Jarboe St., Kansas City, Missouri
- Lustron House - 2 E. Porte Cimi Pas St., Kansas City, Missouri
- Lustron House - 8 E. Porte Cimi Pas St., Kansas City, Missouri
- Lustron House - 14 E. Porte Cimi Pas St., Kansas City, Missouri
- Lustron House - 1317 4th St., Platte City, Missouri
- Lustron house - 227 E. Franklin st, Pacific Missouri

=== Nebraska ===
- Lustron House - 3211 17th Street, Columbus, Nebraska
- Lustron House - 1054 East 12th Street, Fremont, Nebraska
- Lustron House - 1802 North Park Avenue, Fremont, Nebraska
- Lustron House - 912 North Baltimore Avenue, Hastings, Nebraska
- Lustron House - 202 Washington Street, Venango, Nebraska
- Lustron House - 611 St. James Avenue, Wynot, Nebraska
- Lustron House - 2025 NW Radial Hwy, Omaha, Nebraska
- Lustron House - 1305 Norris Avenue, McCook, Nebraska

=== New Jersey ===
- Harold Hess Lustron House, Closter Borough, New Jersey, listed on the NRHP in Bergen County
- William A. Wittmer Lustron House, Alpine Borough, New Jersey, listed on the NRHP in Bergen County
- 1300 Ocean Avenue, Seabright, New Jersey, at northeast corner of Angler's Marina property. No other information known. Monmouth County
- 4 Laurie Road, Landing, New Jersey 07850
- 35 Vail Road, Landing, New Jersey 07850
- 246 Queen St Woodbury, NJ 08096 [Info Source; Personal Observation-Frederick R. Giebel, IFA, ASA]
- 111 Tomlin Station Rd Gibbstown, NJ 08027 [Info Source; Personal Observation-Frederick R. Giebel, IFA, ASA]

=== New York ===
- Lustron Houses of Jermain Street Historic District, Albany, New York, listed on the NRHP in Albany County
- Bishop Family Lustron House, Schenectady, New York, listed on the NRHP in Schenectady County
- Lustron House, 23 Hurst Ave, Chautauqua NY 14722 (a contributing structure to the historic district of Chautauqua Institution )
- Lustron House, 4 Droms Rd Ext, Glenville, NY 12302
- Lustron House, 35 Phillips Road, Rensselaer, NY, 12144 (tan)
- Lustron House, 6 Lake Shore Dr, Rensselaer, NY 12144 (blue)
- Bullins Family Lustron House, (Westchester Deluxe 3 bedroom), 9 Sanborn Ave, Plattsburgh, NY 12901 (home of Jeffrey Bullins, author)
- Lustron House (Westchester Deluxe 3 bedroom), 601 Clay St, Vestal NY 13850
- Lustron House (Westchester Standard 2 bedroom), 2448 Vestal Parkway E, Vestal NY 13850
- Lustron House (Newport 2 bedroom), 2452 Vestal Parkway E, Vestal NY 13850
- Lustron House 201 Brookland Drive, Syracuse, NY 13208
- Lustron House of Roxford Road South, Syracuse, New York
- Lustron House (Westchester Standard 2 bedroom), 270 Osborne Road, Loudonville, NY 12211
- Lustron House 266 Osborne Rd., Loudonville, NY 12211
- Lustron House 268 Osborne Rd, Loudonville, NY 12211 Heavily modified.
- Lustron House, 1 Charming Lane, Loudonville, NY 12211
- Lustron House, 2 Charming Lane, Loudonville, NY 12211
- Lustron House, 249 Hackett Blvd, Albany, NY (re-sided, addition)
- Lustron House, 355 South Main Ave, Albany, NY (tan, Lustron Garage)
- Lustron House, 557 Falconer St, Jamestown, NY (light blue)
- Lustron House, 226 Hall Ave, Jamestown, NY (light blue)
- Lustron house (Westchester Deluxe) 26 Palmer Avenue in Ballston Lake, NY (tan)
- Lustron House, 62 Church St (Route 50), Ballston Spa, NY (tan, altered windows)
- Lustron house (Westchester Deluxe), 10 Pond Meadow Road, Croton on Hudson, NY 10520
- Lustron House, 121 Manor Dr, Syracuse, New York
- Lustron House, Westchester 2 bedroom, Dove grey. 111 Halcyon Hill, Ithaca, NY 14850.

Visual I.D.

- Lustron House, 37 Park St, Port Crane, NY 13833, light gray pictures on Zillow
- Lustron House, Westchester 2 model on basement, 20 Henrietta Blvd, Amsterdam, NY (tan)
- Lustron House, Westchester 2 model, 110 Evelyn Ave, Amsterdam, NY (Light Blue)
- Lustron House, Westchester 3 model + G-2 Garage and Breezeway, 23 Dartmouth, Amsterdam, NY (Destroyed by fire) (Light Gray)
- Lustron House, Westchester 2 model, 207 Northampton Road, Amsterdam, NY (tan)
- Lustron House, Blue, 15 Blue Barns Rd., Rexford, NY
- Lustron House, 3 bedroom, 1 bath, blue, 1951, 2 car garage, 4605 Meadowbrook Rd. Niagara Falls, NY 14305
- Lustron House, 2 bedroom, 1 bath, grey, 1944, 1 car garage, 230 N Water St. Lewiston, NY 14092
- Lustron House, 2 bedroom, 1 bath, grey/green, 1949, 26 Slater Drive, Glenville NY 12302
- Lustron House, Westchester deluxe model, 3381 North Boston Rd., Eden, New York

=== North Carolina ===
- Lustron Houses of North Carolina, NC Modernist Society (numerous NC examples shown on this page)
- Thirsty Skull Brewing - Pittsboro Taproom, Lustron House, Westchester 2 model, 684 West Street, Pittsboro, NC (tan)
- Lustron House, Westchester Deluxe 2 model, 1404 Virginia Avenue, Durham, NC 27705
- Lustron House, Westchester Deluxe 2 model, 2302 Lawndale Dr, Greensboro NC
- Lustron House, Westchester Deluxe 2 model, 1321 Sunset Ave, Rocky Mount, NC (tan), with Lustron shed
- Lustron House, Westchester 2 model, 918 Eastern Ave, Rocky Mount, NC (Maize Yellow)
- Lustron House, 1821 Ebert Road, Winston-Salem NC
- Lustron House, 314 Haywood st, Raleigh, NC
- Lustron House, 1300 E 4th st, Greenville, NC
- Bruce A. and June L. Elmore Lustron House - 70 Hampden Rd., Asheville, Listed on the NRHP

=== North Dakota ===
- Lustron House, 1122 Third Street, Devils Lake
- Lustron House, 1021 Fifth Street Northeast, Devils Lake
- Lustron House, 1036 Fifth Street Northeast, Devils Lake
- Lustron House and Garage, 1501 South Fifth Street, Fargo
- Lustron House, 1545 South Sixth Street, Fargo
- Lustron House, 1613 South Sixth Street, Fargo
- Lustron House, 1621 South Sixth Street, Fargo
- Lustron House, 1622 South Sixth Street, Fargo
- Lustron House, 1638 North Seventh Street, Fargo
- Lustron House, 1248 North Ninth Street, Fargo (Destroyed by June 20, 1957 tornado - material salvaged for garage at 1501 S. 5th)
- Lustron House, 1334 North Ninth Street, Fargo
- Lustron House, 1434 North Ninth Street, Fargo
- Lustron House, 208 3rd Street West, Finley
- Lustron House, 207 Washington Ave E., Finley
- Lustron House, 209 10th Street West, Harvey
- Lustron House, 208 First Avenue Southeast, Hillsboro
- Lustron House, 424 12th Avenue, Langdon
- Lustron House, relocated (maybe from 602 Lincoln Drive) to the Grand Forks County Historical Society, 2405 Belmont Road, Grand Forks
- Lustron House, 401 Park Avenue Grand Forks (nearly unrecognizable; heavily transmogrified)

=== Ohio ===
Northwest

- Lustron House 805 E Tully St, Convoy, Ohio (3 bedroom)
- Lustron House 130 Woodley Ave, Findlay, Ohio (number 665)
- Lustron House 505 S Maple St, Hicksville, Ohio
- Lustron House 713 Maple Heights Dr, Galion, Ohio
- Lustron House 717 Maple Heights Dr, Galion, Ohio
- Lustron House 729 Maple Heights Dr, Galion, Ohio
- Lustron House 736 Maple Heights Dr, Galion, Ohio
- Lustron House 2942 Starr Ave, Oregon, Ohio
- Lustron House 3547 Starr Ave, Oregon, Ohio
- Lustron House 519 W Indiana Ave, Perrysburg, Ohio
- Lustron House 6025 Summit Street, Sylvania, Ohio
- Lustron House 1649 Circular Rd, Toledo, Ohio
- Lustron House 4219 Douglas Rd, Toledo, Ohio
- Lustron House 3851 Watson Ave, Toledo, Ohio
- Lustron House 2003 Farnham Rd, Toledo, Ohio
- Lustron House 2123 Copley Dr, Toledo, Ohio
- Lustron House 1862 Wildwood Rd, Toledo, Ohio
- Lustron House 4337 Harvest Ln, Toledo, Ohio
- Lustron House 4938 Fair Oaks Dr, Toledo, Ohio
- Lustron House 44 W Poinsetta Ave, Toledo, Ohio
- Lustron House 5401 Ottawa River Rd, Toledo, Ohio
- Lustron House 1848 E Manhattan Blvd, Toledo, Ohio
- Lustron House 2651 Greenway St, Toledo, Ohio
- Lustron House 540 W Gramercy Ave, Toledo, Ohio
- Lustron House 3244 Heatherdowns Blvd, Toledo, Ohio
- Lustron House 3209 Beverly Dr, Toledo, Ohio
- Lustron House 1814 Balkan Pl, Toledo, Ohio
- Lustron House 2348 Sherwood Ave, Toledo, Ohio
- Lustron House 2712 Copland Blvd, Toledo, Ohio
- Lustron House 2975 S Byrne Rd, Toledo, Ohio
- Lustron House 46 Pasadena Blvd, Toledo, Ohio
- Lustron House 742 Waybridge Rd, Toledo, Ohio
- Lustron House 4601 Willys Pkwy, Toledo, Ohio
- Lustron House 2757 York St, Toledo, Ohio
- Lustron House 860 Jefferson Street, Vermilion, Ohio

Northeast

- Lustron House 1001 Overlook Drive, Alliance, Ohio
- Lustron House 4908 13th Street SW, Canton, Ohio (2 bedroom, Tan)
- Lustron House 1500 Merl Ave, Cleveland, Ohio 44109 (serial #01093; 2 bedrooms, 1 bath, 1059 sq.ft)
- Lustron House 30 Stanton Ave., Boardman, Ohio
- Lustron House 1022 Keystone Rd, Cleveland Heights, Ohio
- Lustron House 2906 Hudson Drive, Cuyahoga Falls, Ohio
- Lustron House 201 E. 14th St., Elyria, Ohio
- Lustron House 413 17th St NE, Massillon, Ohio
- Lustron House 110 Hummel Ave, New Philadelphia, Ohio
- Lustron House 30555 Center Ridge Rd, Westlake, Ohio
- Lustron House, 222 Opal Blvd, Steubenville, Ohio (2 bedroom, 1 bath. Garage. 964 sq.ft)
- Lustron House 24048 Mastick Rd, North Olmsted, Ohio
- Lustron House 3309 Tuxedo Ave, Parma, Ohio
- Lustron House, 2812 Rogers Rd, Youngstown, Ohio
- Lustron House, 420 Perkinswood Blvd, Warren, Ohio

Central

- Lustron House, 272 East Weisheimer, Columbus, Ohio
- Lustron House, 27 Kanawha, Columbus, Ohio
- Lustron House, 185 Arden, Columbus, Ohio
- Lustron House, 214 Arden, Columbus, Ohio
- Lustron House 868 S. Broadleigh Rd, Columbus, Ohio
- Lustron House 1616 E Weber Road, Columbus Ohio
- Lustron House 34 S. Broadleigh Rd, Columbus, Ohio
- Lustron House 618 Brookside Dr, Columbus, Ohio
- Lustron House 101 Edgevale Rd, Columbus, Ohio
- Lustron House 71 N. Kellner Rd, Columbus, Ohio
- Lustron Garage 45 N. Ashburton Rd, Columbus, Ohio
- Lustron House 2452 Lockbourne Rd, Columbus, Ohio (Newport model)
- Lustron House 160 S. James Rd, Columbus, Ohio (Newport, basement garage, moved from Lustron factory)
- Lustron House 79 S. Hamilton Rd, Gahanna, Ohio (3-bedroom)
- Lustron House 188 Welsh Hills Rd, Granville, Ohio (basement)
- Lustron House 1959 Harrisburg Pk, Grove City, Ohio
- Lustron House 3359 Kingston Ave, Grove City, Ohio
- Lustron House 740 W. 6th St, Marysville, OH
- Lustron House 6 W Lamartine St, Mount Vernon, Ohio
- Lustron House 247 Stare Road Newark, Ohio
- Lustron House 168 North 30th St Newark, Ohio
- Lustron House 7491 S. Black Rd, Pataskala, Ohio
- Lustron House 7658 E. Main St, Reynoldsburg, Ohio (3-bdrm, garage, breezeway)
- Lustron House 9990 Lilly Chapel Georgesville Rd, West Jefferson, Ohio
- Lustron House 400 N. Hamilton Rd, Whitehall, Ohio

Southwest

- Lustron House 11 West Oak St, Alexandria, Ohio
- Lustron House 4705 Sycamore Road, Cincinnati, Ohio
- Lustron House 2900 Princeton Dr, Dayton, Ohio
- Lustron House 2905 Princeton Dr, Dayton, Ohio
- Lustron House 2820 Earlham Dr, Dayton, Ohio
- Lustron House 2810 Earlham Dr, Dayton, Ohio
- Lustron House 3007 Cornell Dr, Dayton, Ohio
- Lustron House 1647 Parkhill Dr, Dayton, Ohio
- Lustron House 1734 Tennyson Ave, Dayton, Ohio
- Lustron House 160 W Norman Ave, Dayton, Ohio
- Lustron House 92 Carson Ave, Dayton, Ohio
- Lustron House 8200 Inwood Ave, Dayton, Ohio
- Lustron House, 66 Fer Don Road, Dayton, Ohio
- Lustron House 103 Memorial Dr, Greenville, OH
- Lustron House 1011 Sorg Place, Middletown, Ohio
- Lustron House 1103 Sorg Place, Middletown, Ohio
- Lustron House 1107 Sorg Place, Middletown, Ohio
- Lustron House 2700 Flemming Rd, Middletown, Ohio
- Lustron House 506 Aberdeen Dr, Middletown, Ohio
- Lustron House 508 Aberdeen Dr, Middletown, Ohio
- Lustron House 917 Fourteenth Ave, Middletown, Ohio
- Lustron House 925 Fourteenth Ave, Middletown, Ohio
- Lustron House 3933 Standish Ave, Silverton, Ohio
- Lustron House 214 East McCreight Ave, Springfield, Ohio
- Lustron House 1987 Harshman Blvd, Springfield, Ohio
- Lustron House 883 Scioto St, Urbana, Ohio
- Lustron House 53 West Mills Ave, Wyoming, Ohio
- Lustron House 45 W Charlotte Ave, Wyoming, Ohio
- Lustron House 162 W Franklin St, Centerville, Ohio (now a barber shop!)
- Lustron House 653 Country Club Dr, Xenia, Ohio
- Lustron House 909 Old Springfield Pike, Xenia, Ohio
- Lustron House 919 Old Springfield Pike, Xenia, Ohio

Southeast

- Lustron House 2612 Shawnee Rd, Portsmouth, Ohio
- Lustron House 162 N Main st, Roseville, Ohio
- Lustron House 490 Zanesville rd, Roseville, Ohio

=== Oklahoma ===
- Lustron House, 1554 SW Rogers, Bartlesville, OK
- Josephine Reifsnyder Lustron House, Stillwater, OK
- Christian K. Usher Luston House, Cushing, OK
- Lustron House, 1012 W Davis Dr, Nowata, OK
- Lustron House, 1713 N Harvard Av, Tulsa, OK

=== Pennsylvania ===
- Lustron House, 6603 Forward Ave, Pittsburgh, PA
- Lustron House, 6605 Forward Ave, Pittsburgh, PA
- Lustron House, 808 Erdner Ave, Pittsburgh, PA 15202 (surf blue with yellow trim for windows; 2-bedroom Westchester Deluxe, cork floors)
- Lustron House, 2672 Summit St, Bethel Park, PA 15102
- Lustron House, 14 Woodlawn Ave, Crafton, PA
- Lustron House, 916 Kahkwa Blvd, Erie, PA
- Lustron House, 156 Parkway Dr, Erie, PA
- Lustron House, 3907 Iroquois Ave, Erie, PA
- Lustron House, 138 Norman Way, Erie, PA
- Lustron House, 406 E. Fairfield Ave, New Castle, PA
- Lustron House, 1814 E Caracas Ave, Hershey, PA
- Lustron House, 2183 Connolly Ave, Bethlehem, PA
- Lustron House, 2179 Connolly Ave, Bethlehem, PA
- Lustron House, 2042 Huntington St, Bethlehem, PA
- Lustron House, 810 Hawthorne Rd, Bethlehem, PA
- Lustron House, 3225 Edinburgh Rd, Allentown, PA
- Lustron House, 1217 N 17th St, Harrisburg, PA
- Lustron House, 5621 Devonshire Rd, Harrisburg, PA
- Lustron House, 3337 N. 2nd St, Harrisburg, PA
- Lustron House, 1603 Robin Rd, Lebanon, PA 17042
- Lustron House, 421 Fifth Street, California, PA
- Lustron House, 815 Shutterly Street, California, PA
- Lustron House, 498 Park Road, Ambridge, PA
- Lustron House, 2113 Hackett Avenue, Easton, PA

=== South Dakota ===
- Cassidy House, Lustron Newport 2-Bedroom, 4121 Canyon Lake Drive, Rapid City, South Dakota, listed on the NRHP in Pennington County
- Maurice Nelson House, Rapid City, South Dakota, listed on the NRHP in Pennington County
- Faye Bowden-Agnus Saunders House, Huron, South Dakota, listed on the NRHP in Beadle County
- Margaret and Vernon Moxon House, Huron, South Dakota, listed on the NRHP in Beadle County
- Mack Jones House, Miller, listed on the NRHP in Hand County
- Mitchell Lustron Historic District, a grouping of three Lustron homes in Mitchell, South Dakota, listed on the NRHP in Davison County
- Peter Hansen House, Pierre, South Dakota, listed on the NRHP in Hughes County
- Edbert and Josie Opitz House, Redfield, listed on the NRHP in Spink County
- Orlan A Hayward House, Sioux Falls, listed on the NRHP in Minnehaha County
- Grant J. Reynolds House, Sioux Falls, listed on the NRHP in Minnehaha County
- Laura M. Welch House, Sioux Falls, listed on the NRHP in Minnehaha County

=== Tennessee ===
- Caldwell Lustron House, Union City, Tennessee, listed on the NRHP in Obion County
- 2399 Eastwood Avenue, Binghampton, Memphis, Tennessee
- 3608 Charleswood Avenue, High Point Terrace, Memphis, Tennessee, listed on the NRHP in Shelby County
- 222 Chamberlain Boulevard, Lindbergh Forest, Knoxville, Tennessee, listed on the NRHP in Knox County
- 3510 Glenhurst Drive, Lindbergh Forest, Knoxville, Tennessee, listed on the NRHP in Knox County
- 608 Cedar Lane, Tullahoma, Tennessee
- 533 Mt. Ida Place, Kingsport, TN

=== Texas ===
- Lustron House, 5006 W Amherst Ave, Dallas, TX
- Lustron House, 4701 Marks Pl, Fort Worth, TX

=== Virginia ===
- Lustron House, pre-fabricated, all steel, porcelain-enamel, 2 bedrooms on concrete slab, built in 1948, 4647 3rd Street South, Arlington, Arlington County, VA, demolished 2007.
- 5201 12th Street, South, Arlington, VA, surveyed by the Historic American Buildings Survey (HABS), demolished October 24, 2016.
- 130 Sunset Dr, Danville, VA
- 144 Sunset Dr, Danville, VA
- 193 Sunset Dr, Danville, VA
- 218 Sunset Dr, Danville, VA
- 179 Howeland Cir, Danville, VA
- 176 Westminster Ct, Danville, VA
- 126 Clarendon Cir, Danville, VA
- 127 Clarendon Cir, Danville, VA
- 305 Cherry Ln, Danville, VA
- 235 Jefferson Dr, Bristol, VA
- 611 Arlington Ave, Bristol, VA
- 1614 Long Cres Dr, Bristol, VA
- 707 Auburn Pl, Martinsville, VA

=== West Virginia ===
- 106 Gillespie Addition, Beckley, WV
- 206 Vine St, Beckley, WV
- 121 Mankin Ave, Beckley, WV
- 201 Lincoln St, Beckley, WV
- 101 Findley St, Elkins, WV
- 2213 Hess Ave, Wheeling, WV
- 54 Elm Ln, Wheeling, WV
- 2849 Washington Blvd, Huntington, WV
- 400 Green Oak Dr, Huntington, WV
- 120 N. 8th St, Wheeling, WV
- 301 21st St, Dunbar, WV

There are at least four of these homes in the Kanawha City section of Charleston, WV. There may have been four located in the Morgantown, WV area. Three known to be on Arch Street have been demolished.

- 8 Pallister Rd, Wheeling, WV
- 520 Johnson Ave, Bridgeport, WV
- 731 E Main St, Clarksburg, WV
- 1100 Van Buren St, Clarksburg, WV

=== Wisconsin ===
Wisconsin received about 100 or so Lustron homes, built between 1948 and 1950.

Appleton

- 99 Johnson Ct, Appleton, WI (two homes on cul du sac)
- 1909 N Union St, Appleton, WI

Beloit

- 1718 Arlington Ave, Beloit, WI

Black River Falls

- 420 Pierce St, Black River Falls, WI

Burlington

- 340 Origen St, Burlington, WI

Darlington

- 723 WI-23 Trunk
- 755 WI-23 Trunk
- 810 WI-81 Trunk

Eau Claire

- Einar and Alice Borton House, listed on the National Register of Historic Places in Eau Claire County, Wisconsin
- 1831 Badger Ave, Eau Claire, WI
- 1700 Fairway St, Eau Claire, WI
- 2104 N. Hillcrest Pkwy, Altoona, WI

Fond du Lac

- 341 Boyd St, Fond du Lac, WI

Green Bay

- 998 9th St, Green Bay, WI
- 322 Bellevue St, Green Bay, WI
- Rev. Nørb's Lustron House at 717 Porlier St, Green Bay, WI
- 919 Reed St, Green Bay, WI (razed)

Hillsboro

- 635 Hillsborough Ave, Hillsboro, WI

Janesville

- 825 N Washington St, Janesville, WI

Kenosha

- 7502 21st Ave, Kenosha, WI
- 3901 Taft Rd, Kenosha, WI
- 5540 37th Ave, Kenosha, WI
- 2032 74th Pl, Kenosha, WI

La Crosse

- 751 22nd St N, La Crosse, WI
- 4514 Mormon Coulee Rd, La Crosse, WI
- 1830 Losey Blvd S, La Crosse, WI

Lake Geneva

- 1005 Grant St, Lake Geneva, WI

Madison

- 432 N Blackhawk Avenue, Madison, WI
- 556 Chatham Ter, Madison, WI (Demolished)
- 418 Critchell Ter, Madison, WI (Demolished)
- 2410 Waunona Way, Madison, WI
- 3553 Heather Crest, Madison WI
- 3810 Saint Clair St, Madison, WI
- 513 N Owen Dr, Madison, WI
- 505 S Owen Dr, Madison, WI
- 534 Glenway St, Madison, WI

Marshall

- 200 Block of Elm Street Marshall, WI

Menasha

- 712 Carver Ln, Menasha, WI

Middleton

- 7120 North Ave, Middleton, WI Yellow.

Milwaukee

In Milwaukee, 15 Lustron homes survive, as of 2014, in a cluster around Lincoln Creek north of Capitol Drive and Cooper Park. These are mostly the Winchester model, but the home at 5520 W. Philip Pl., which has a "unique blue and yellow color scheme, is almost certainly one of the early Esquire “demonstration” homes, which first appeared in 1946."

- 3802 West Capitol Dr, Milwaukee, WI

Monona

- 1305 Wyldhaven Ave, Monona, WI
- 208 Starry Ave, Monona, WI

Montello

- 51 Stevens Ave, Montello, WI

Mount Horeb

- 207 Center Ave, Mount Horeb, WI

Neenah

- 556 Grove St, Neenah, WI

New Glarus

- 419 8th Ave, New Glarus, WI

Oshkosh

- 919 W 4th Ave, Oshkosh, WI
- 1020 Baldwin Ave, Oshkosh, WI

Portage

- 1125 West Wisconsin St, Portage, WI

Shullsburg

- 221 S Galena St, Shullsburg, WI

Sturgeon Bay

- 116 N 9th Ave, Sturgeon Bay, WI 54235

Verona

- 205 S Franklin St, Verona, WI
- 203 Westlawn Ave, Verona, WI

Waterford

- 105 North Jefferson Street, Waterford, WI

== See also ==
- List of Hobart Welded Steel House Co. houses
