= Alice Patterson =

Alice Patterson may refer to:

- Alice Pennefather (1903–1983), Singaporean badminton and tennis player, née Patterson
- Alice Patterson, original co-owner of Patterson House (Larned, Kansas), built 1949
- Alice Patterson, leader of Justice at the Gate, American religious organisation
- Alice Patterson (American tennis player), competitor in 1916 U.S. National Championships – Women's Singles
