= National Register of Historic Places listings in Pawnee County, Kansas =

Location of Pawnee County in Kansas

This is a list of the National Register of Historic Places listings in Pawnee County, Kansas. It is intended to be a complete list of the properties and districts on the National Register of Historic Places in Pawnee County, Kansas, United States. The locations of National Register properties and districts for which the latitude and longitude coordinates are included below, may be seen in an online map.

There are 9 properties and districts listed on the National Register in the county.

This National Park Service list is complete through NPS recent listings posted April 18, 2025.

== Current listings ==
	Name on the Register	Image	Date listed	Location	City or town	Description
1	Babbitt-Doerr House	Babbitt-Doerr House	April 20, 1995 (#95000477)	423 W. 5th St. 38°10′41″N 99°06′11″W	Larned	
2	Coon Creek Crossing on the Santa Fe Trail (Wet Route)		July 17, 2013 (#13000493)	1.5 miles southwest of Garfield on US 56; 38°03′55″N 99°15′32″W	Garfield	Santa Fe Trail Multiple Property Submission
3	JG Edwards Building		April 18, 2025 (#100011706)	518 Broadway St; 38°10′45″N 99°05′54″W	Larned	
4	Fort Larned National Historic Site	Fort Larned National Historic Site	October 15, 1966 (#66000107)	6 miles west of Larned on U.S. Route 156; 38°09′24″N 99°13′36″W	Larned	
5	Lewis Site		May 3, 1976 (#76000836)	Address restricted	Larned	
6	Ooten House		March 2, 2001 (#01000188)	507 W. 15th St. 38°11′21″N 99°06′14″W	Larned	
7	Patterson House		March 2, 2001 (#01000189)	841 W. 8th St. 38°10′53″N 99°06′32″W	Larned	
8	Pawnee Fork Crossing (Santa Fe Trail Dry Route) and Boyd's Ranch Site		July 17, 2013 (#13000494)	Address Restricted	Larned	Santa Fe Trail Multiple Property Submission
9	Township Line Bridge		July 2, 1985 (#85001442)	Off U.S. Route 156, 3 miles west of Rozel; 38°12′18″N 99°27′35″W	Rozel	

== See also ==
- List of National Historic Landmarks in Kansas
- National Register of Historic Places listings in Kansas
