= Hobart Welded Steel House Company and its works =

American steel house manufacturer

Hobart Welded Steel House Company was a company that manufactured 22 pre-fabricated steel houses in Troy, Ohio, from 1932 to 1941. The company and all 22 houses were located in Troy, Ohio.

Sixteen of the houses built by the company, in addition to three garages and a shed, were listed on the U.S. National Register of Historic Places (NRHP) in 1989. Ten of the houses are located on Hobart Circle and Hobart Drive in the Hobart Circle Historic District. Five other houses are extant, but have not been listed on the NRHP. The five non-listed properties are located in Edgehill, but were not deemed to have sufficient historic integrity to support listing on the NRHP. One of the houses, located at 6 Hobart Circle, has been demolished.

Several styles were available. The most used design was for a Georgian Revival style, within the Colonial Revival genre. Eight of the surviving houses are of this style. Three display Dutch Colonial style. Two are one-story Cape Cod houses. Two are one-story Moderne houses.

== List of works ==
=== Hobart Circle Historic District ===
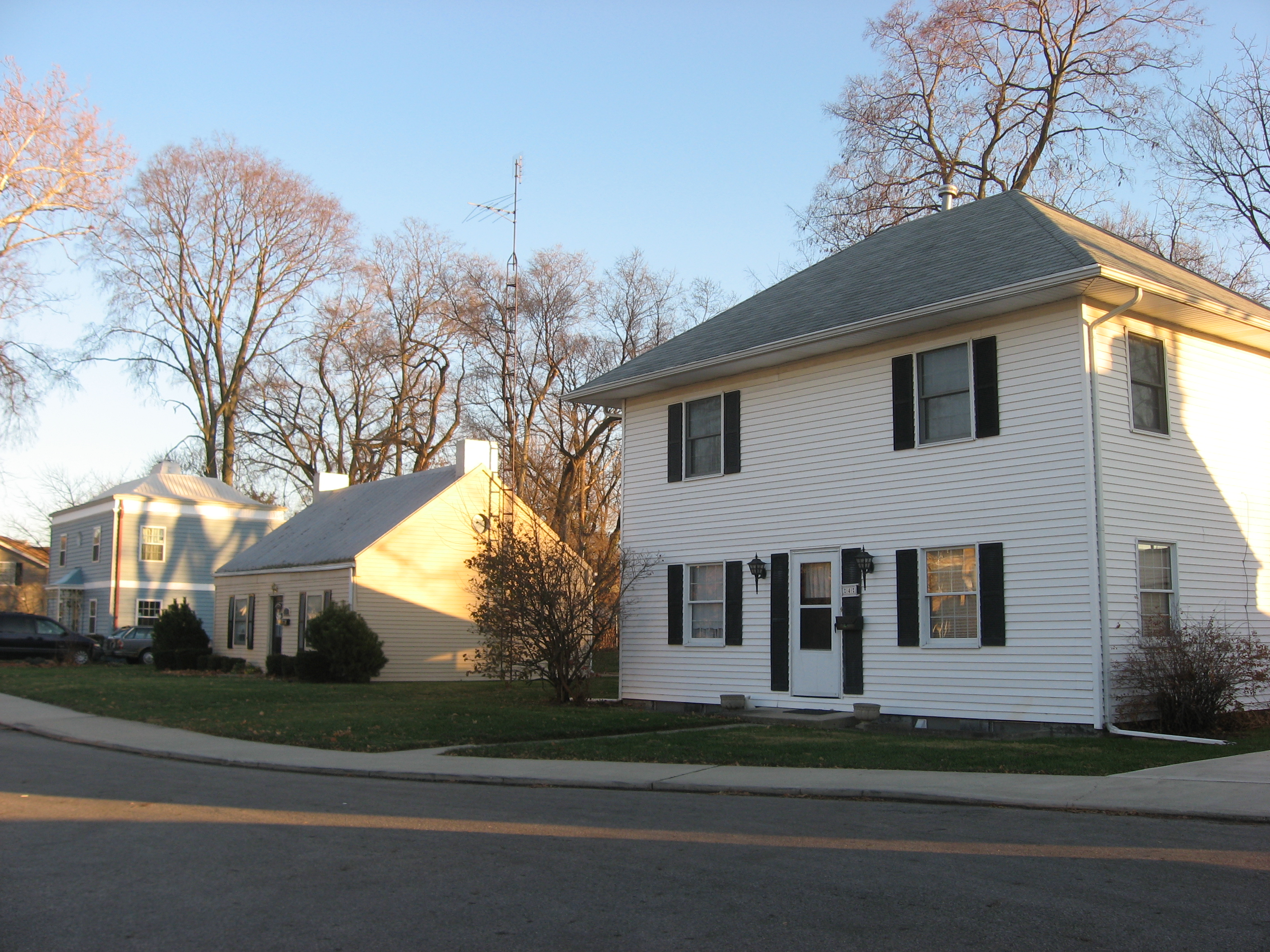

40.041944°N 84.209722°W

Ten houses are NRHP-listed as part of one historic district, the Hobart Circle Historic District. It has refnum 89000419 and was listed on May 25, 1989. It includes houses at 2, 3, 4, 5, 7, 8, and 9 Hobart Circle and at 11 and 23 Hobart Drive, Troy, Ohio. (The house formerly at #6 has been demolished.)

Shown is #4 Hobart Circle

=== House at 1022 West Main Street ===
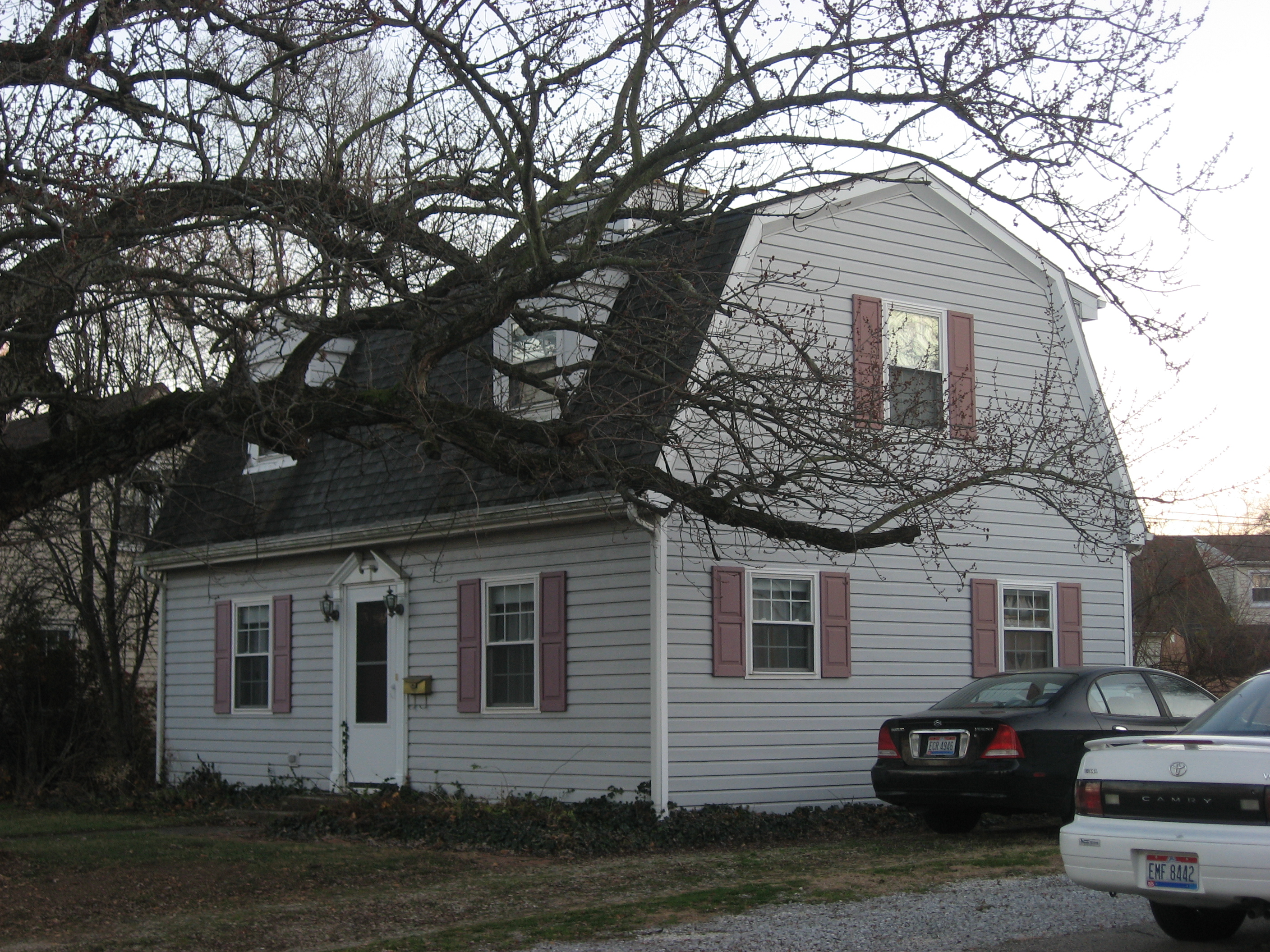

40.045°N 84.217222°W

The House at 1022 West Main Street is NRHP-listed (refnum 89000424) on May 25, 1989. It is located at 1022 West Main Street, Troy, Ohio, and is of the Dutch Colonial style. The Dutch Colonial style can be seen in the photograph, in the mansarding in the roof.

=== House at 203 Penn Road ===
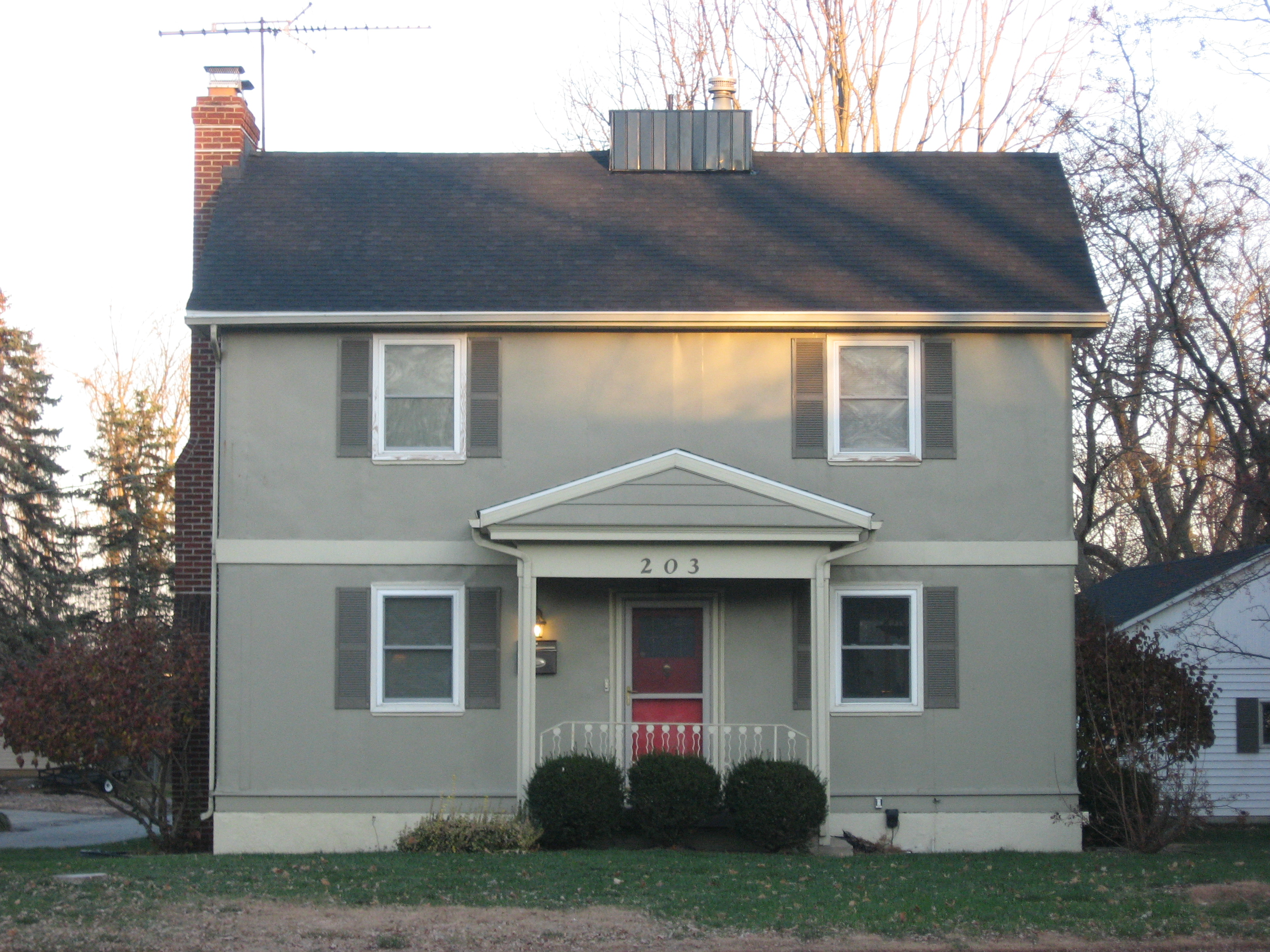

40.0425°N 84.215556°W

The House at 203 Penn Road was separately NRHP-listed (refnum 89000422) on May 25, 1989. It is located at 203 Penn Road, Troy, Ohio. It is Georgian Revival in style.

=== E. A. Hobart House ===
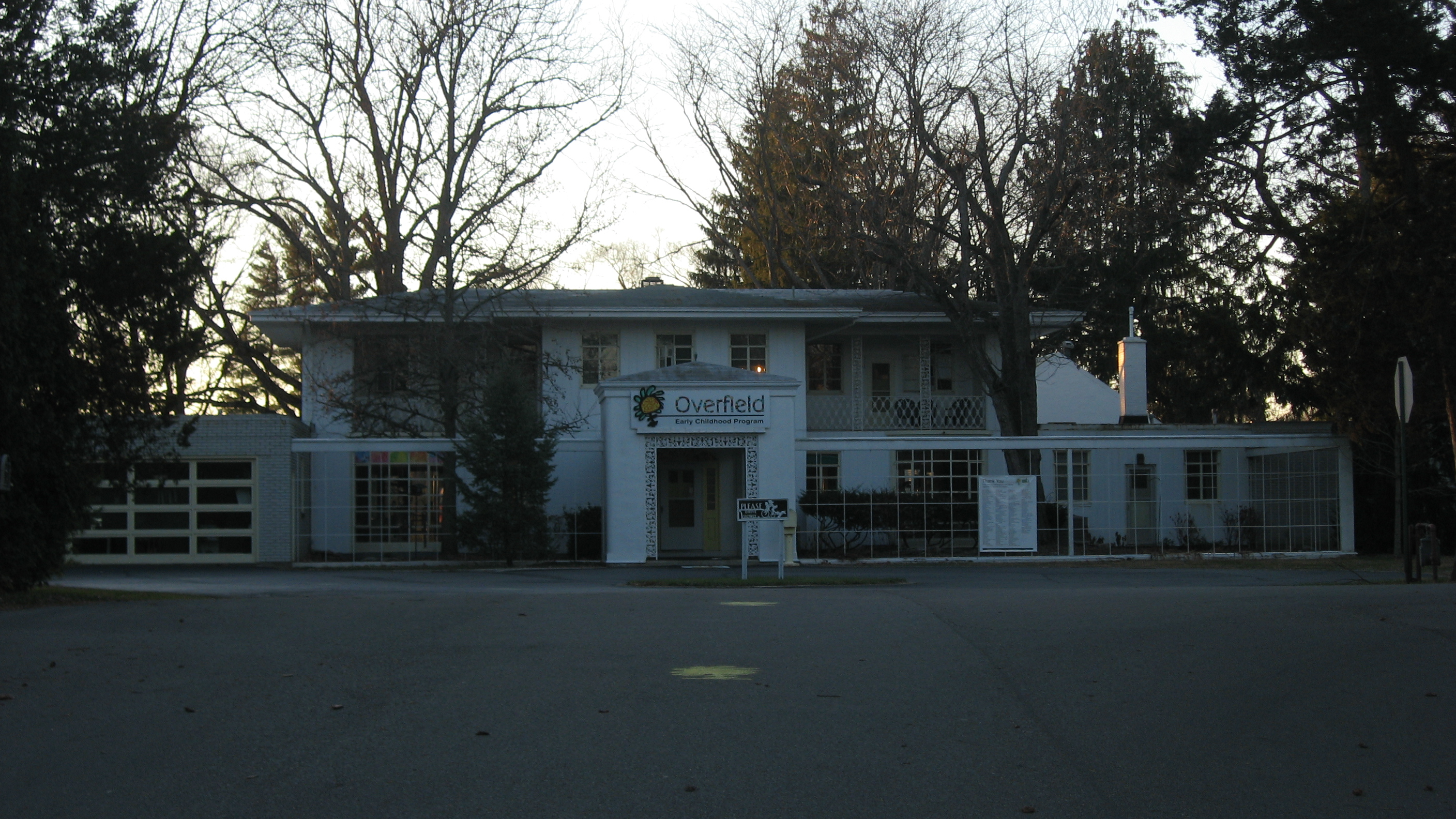

40.043056°N 84.22°W

The E.A. Hobart House is a steel house that was NRHP-listed (refnum 89000420) on May 25, 1989. It is located at 172 South Ridge, Troy, Ohio. It has been termed "an engineering and artistic masterpiece".

=== House at 121 South Ridge ===
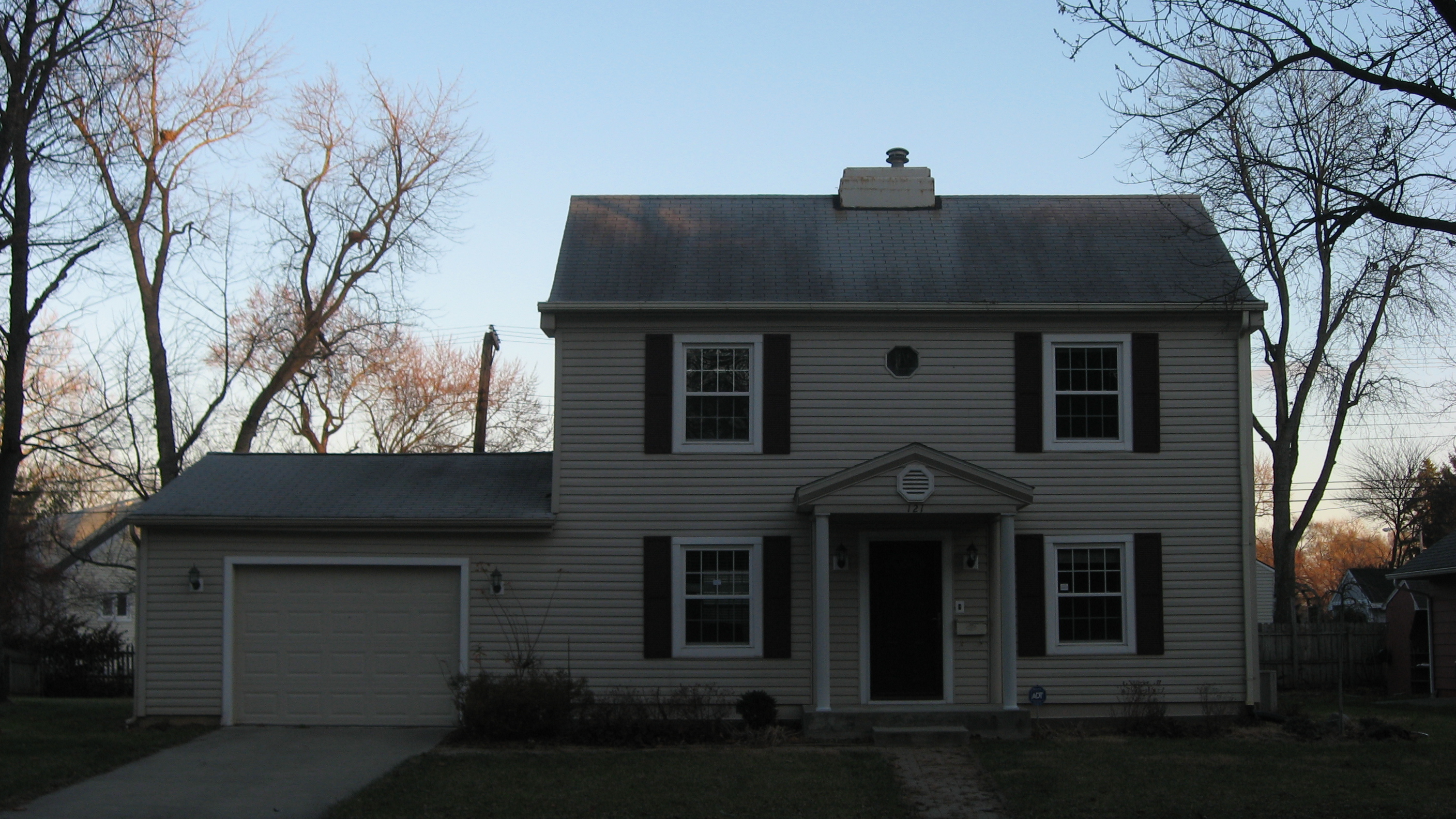

40.044722°N 84.2175°W

The House at 121 South Ridge, also is separately NRHP-listed, with refnum 89000425, and also was listed on May 25, 1989. It is located at 121 South Ridge, Troy, Ohio. It is Georgian Revival in style.

=== House at 129 South Ridge ===
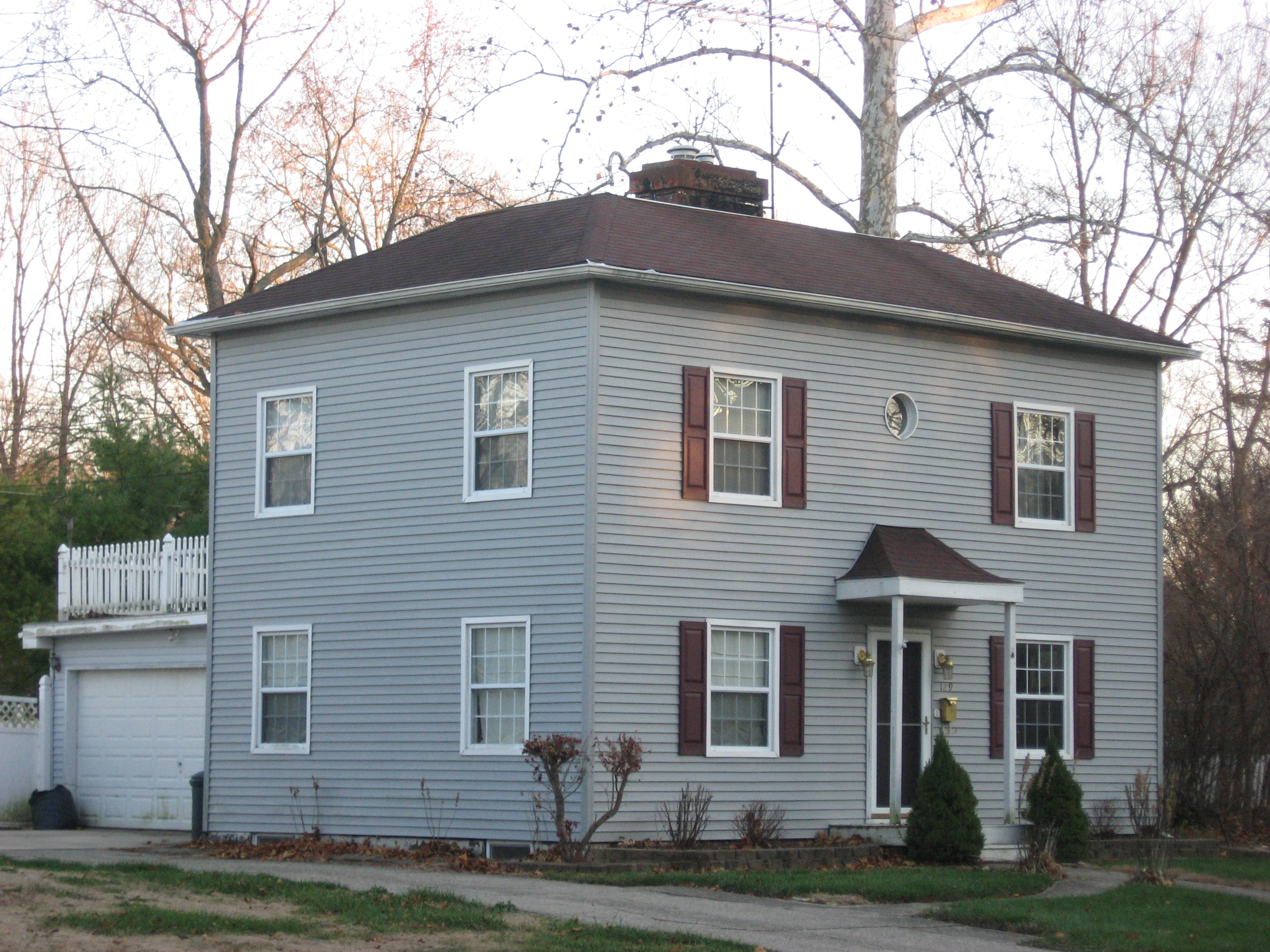

40.044167°N 84.2175°W

The House at 129 South Ridge is separately NRHP-listed (refnum 89000423), as of May 25, 1989, and is located at 129 South Ridge, Troy, Ohio.

=== House at 145 South Ridge ===
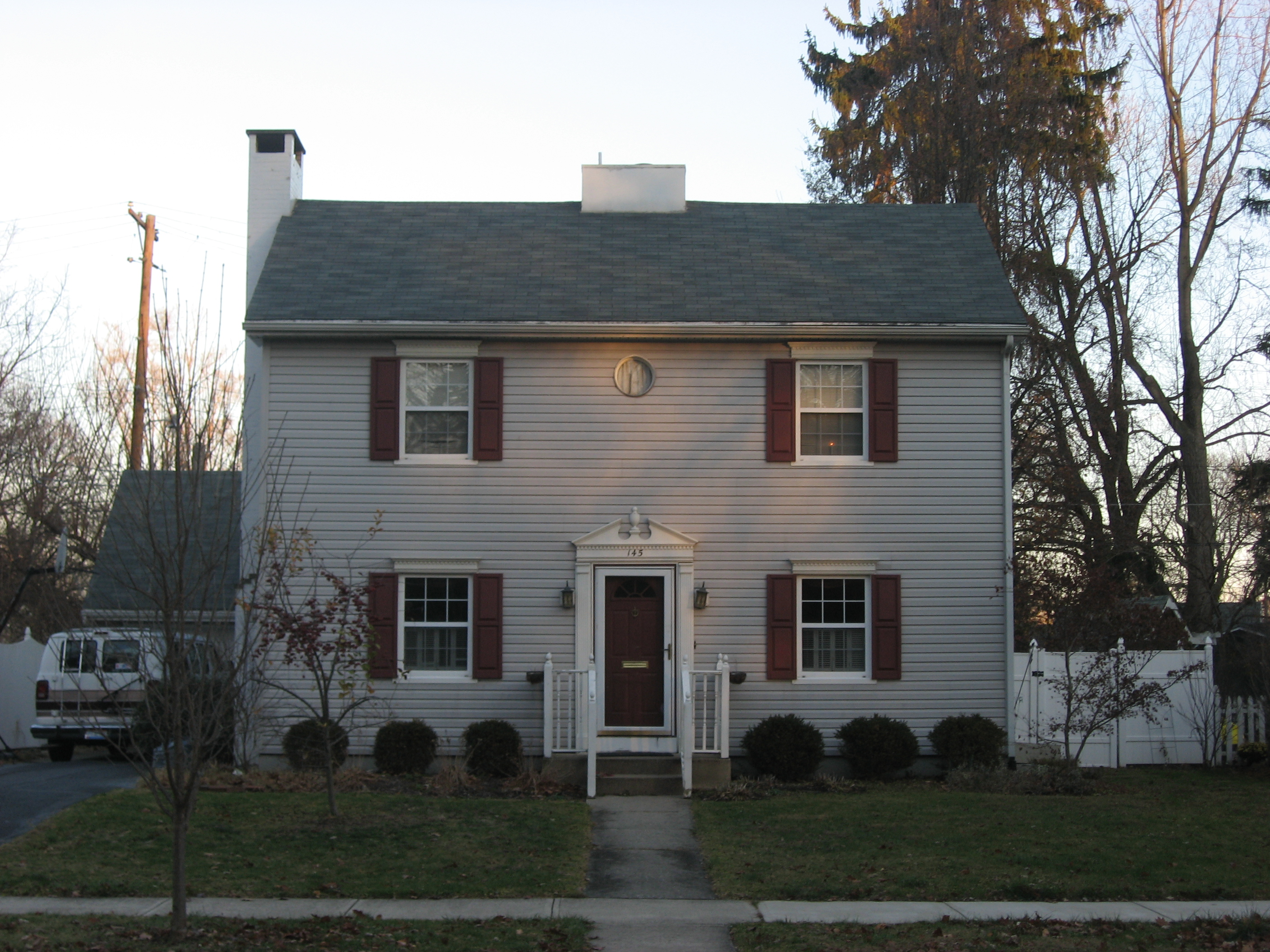

40.043611°N 84.2175°W

The House at 145 South Ridge is NRHP-listed (refnum 89000426) as of May 25, 1989. It is located at 145 South Ridge, Troy, Ohio.

=== William Hobart Vacation House ===
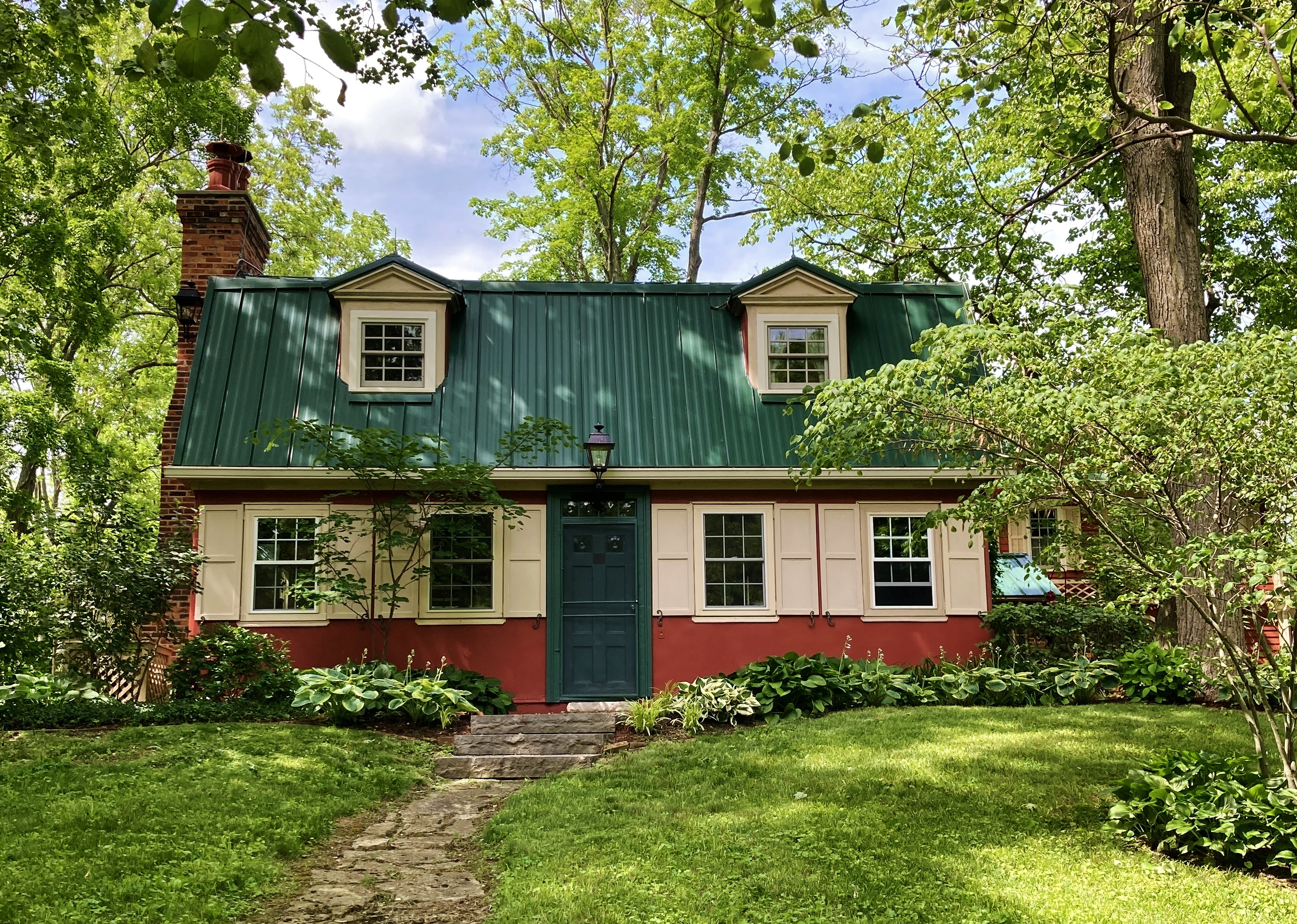

40.082059°N 84.185094°W

The William Hobart Vacation House is NRHP-listed (refnum 89000421) as of May 25, 1989, and located at 995 Polecat Road, Troy, Ohio. Dutch Colonial Revival in style, the house is set in a wooded area; it is a two-story estate house with three bays, in Dutch Colonial Revival style. It has all-steel construction. It includes an underground greenhouse with a glass-brick roof serving as a patio at its rear.

== See also ==
- Lustron house and List of Lustron houses - prefabricated enameled steel houses manufactured by a company in Columbus, Ohio
