= E. L. Newman Lustron House =

Historic house in Alabama, United States

- U.S. National Register of Historic Places
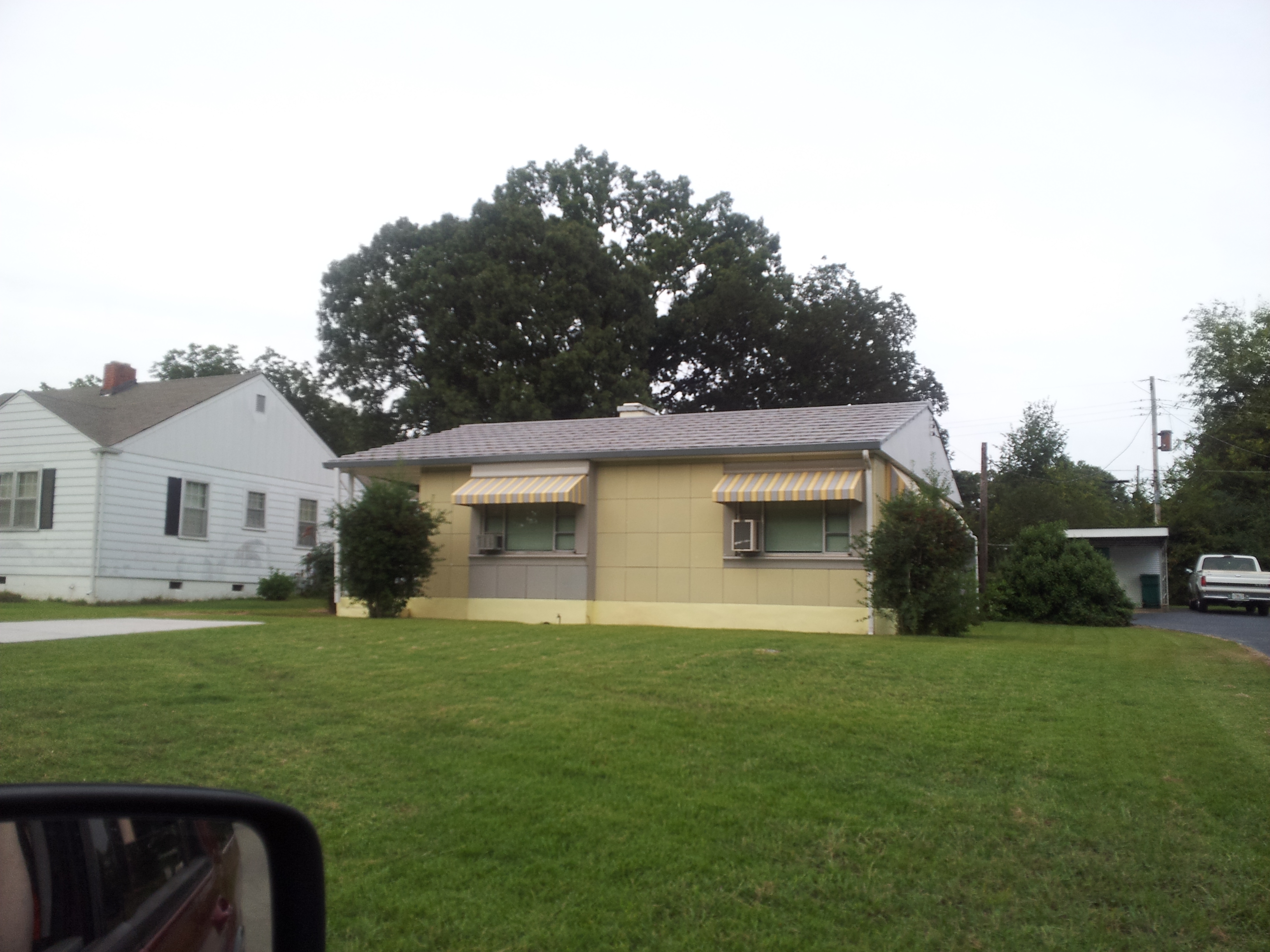
- The house in 2012.

- Location within Alabama Location within the United States
- Location: 1406 34th St., Sheffield, Alabama
- Coordinates: 34°46′14″N 87°40′49″W
- Area: less than one acre
- Built: 1949
- Built by: Lustron Corporation
- Architect: Carl Koch & Associates
- Architectural style: Lustron House
- MPS: Lustron Houses in Alabama, MPS
- NRHP reference No.: 00000134
- Added to NRHP: February 24, 2000

The E. L. Newman Lustron House is a historic residence in Sheffield, Alabama, United States. The house was purchased in 1949 by E. L. Newman. It is one of five extant Lustron houses in The Shoals, and is one of the company's two-bedroom Westchester models. The house has a metal frame with a side gable roof, and is covered in tan porcelain enamel panels. The façade has two aluminum frame windows, each made of one large pane flanked by four vertical panes, with one in a bay that projects slightly. The interior contains the original, metal walls and ceilings and built-in cabinets and shelves. An enclosed glass porch was added to the rear in the 1960s. The house was listed on the National Register of Historic Places in 2000.
