= Stein House (Ashland, Kansas) =

Historic house in Kansas, United States

- U.S. National Register of Historic Places
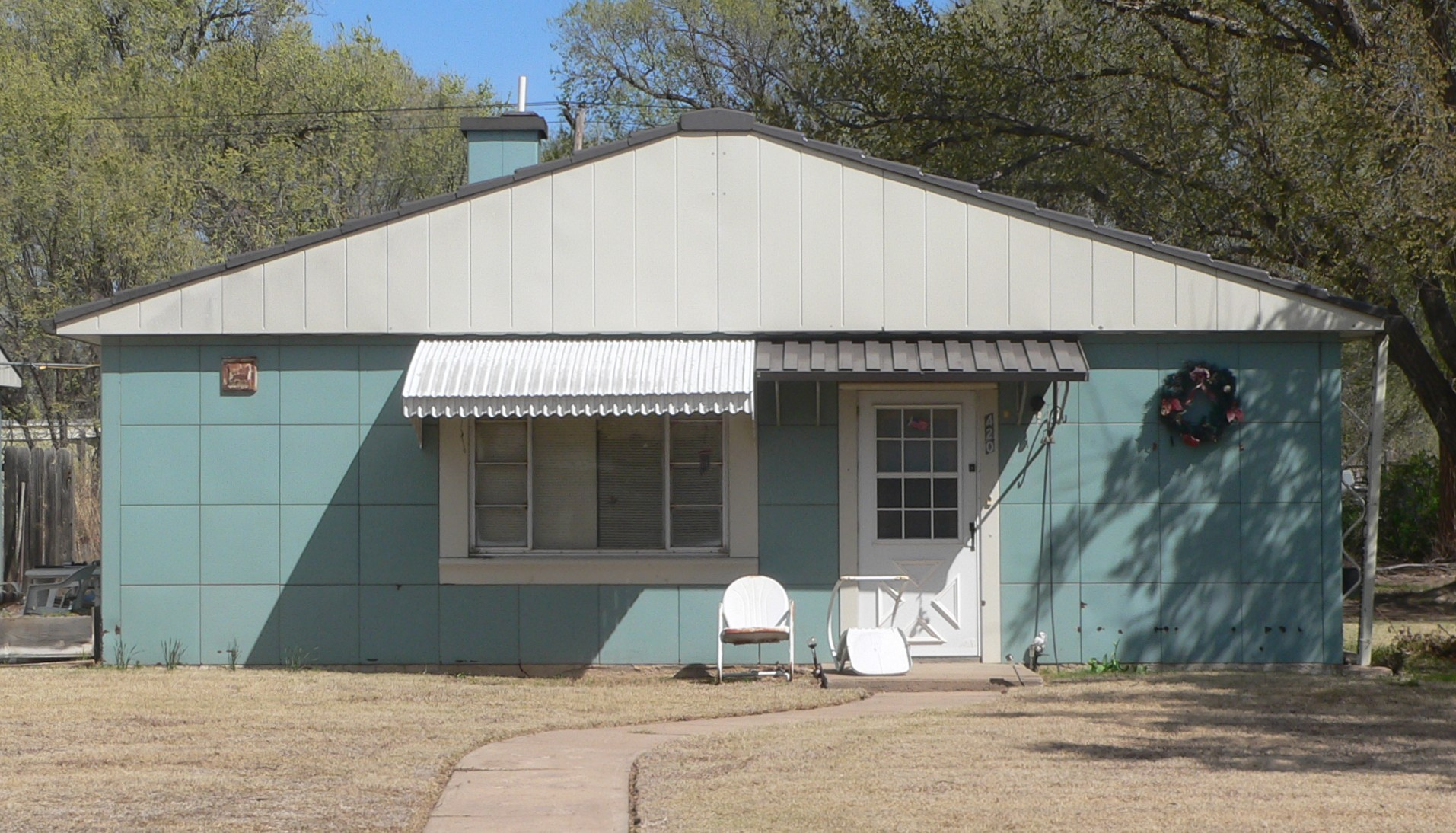

- Location within Kansas Location within the United States
- Location: 420 Cedar St., Ashland, Kansas
- Coordinates: 37°11′31″N 99°45′51″W
- Area: less than one acre
- Built: 1950
- Built by: Merlyn Weidenheiner, Kinsley, KS
- Architectural style: Modern Movement, Westchester Deluxe Lustron
- MPS: Lustron Houses of Kansas MPS
- NRHP reference No.: 01000182
- Added to NRHP: March 2, 2001

The Stein House at 420 Cedar St. in Ashland, Kansas is a three-bedroom Westchester Deluxe model Lustron house built in 1950. It was listed on the National Register of Historic Places in 2001.

It was built by Merlyn Weidenheiner of Kinsley, Kansas.

It includes a three-car Lustron garage.
