= Lustron Home No. 02102 =

Historic house in Iowa, United States

- U.S. National Register of Historic Places
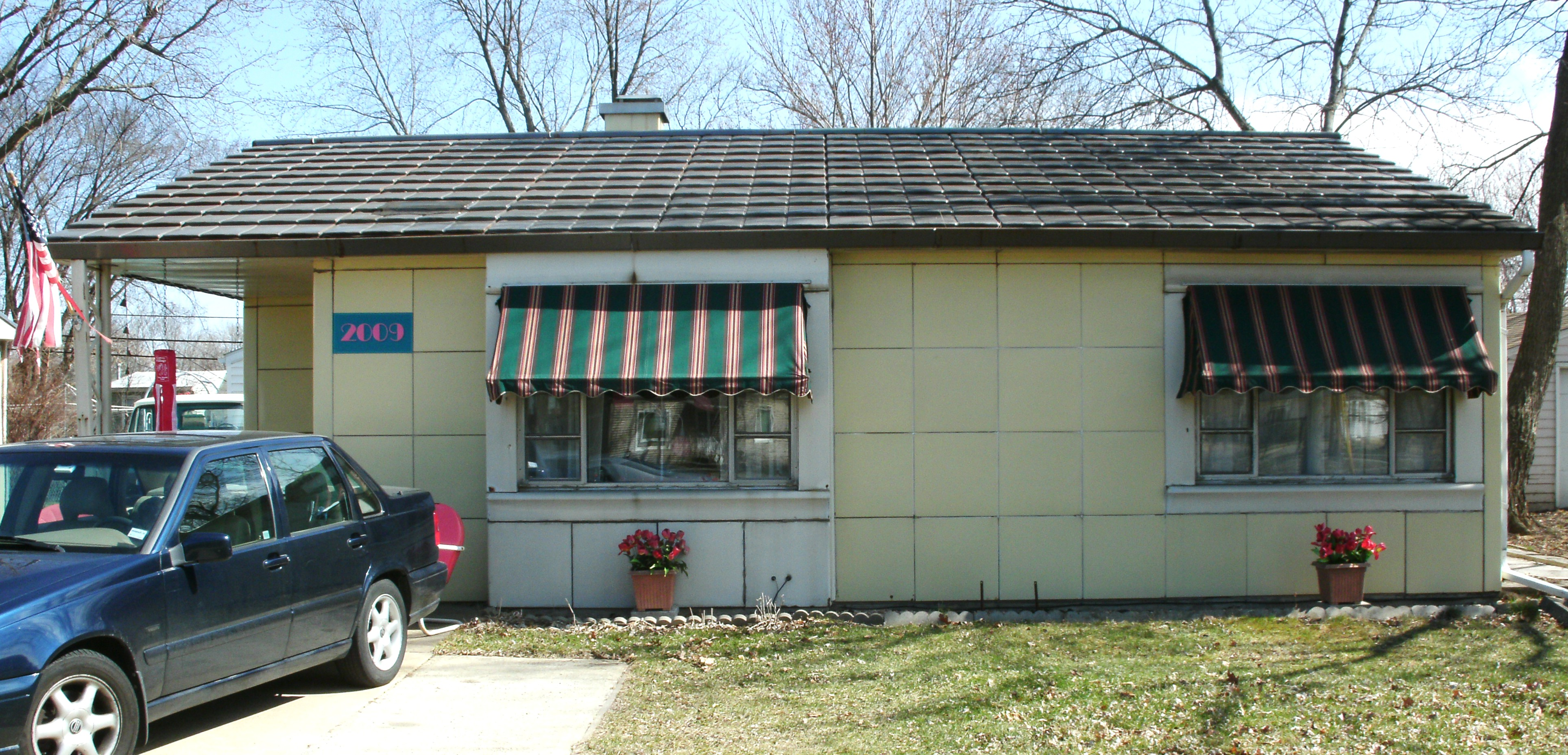

- Location within Iowa Location within the United States
- Location: 2009 Williams Blvd., SW; Cedar Rapids, Iowa
- Coordinates: 41°58′15″N 91°42′03″W
- Area: less than one acre
- Built: c. 1950
- Architect: Lustron Corporation
- Architectural style: Lustron House
- NRHP reference No.: 04000898
- Added to NRHP: August 25, 2004

The Lustron Home No. 02102 is a historic enameled steel prefabricated Lustron house located in Cedar Rapids, Iowa. It was listed on the National Register of Historic Places in 2004.

In 2004 it was deemed significant as one out of just nine surviving Lustron Homes installed in Cedar Rapids, and out of 143 installed in Iowa. Per the NRHP nominating document, it is "an example of the Lustron Corporation's innovative contributions to the prefabricated housing industry and its efforts to incorporate modem architecture and the latest domestic technologies into the lives of everyday Americans."
