= Stradal House =

Historic house in Kansas

- U.S. National Register of Historic Places
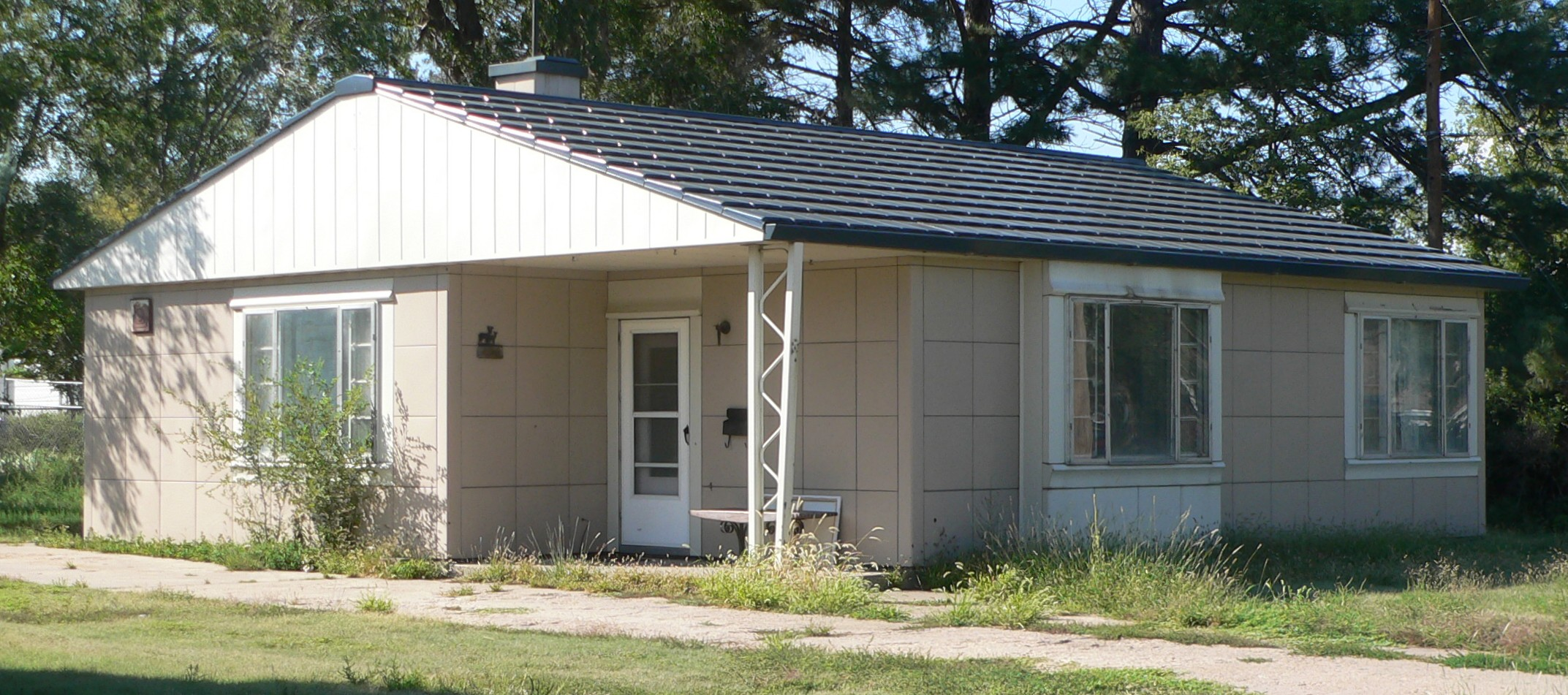

- Location within Kansas
- Location: 409 N 13th St., Wa Keeney, Kansas
- Coordinates: 39.028965°N 99.871967°W
- Area: less than one acre
- Built: 1950
- Built by: Dreiling Implements, Hays, Kansas
- Architectural style: Modern Movement, Westchester Deluxe Lustron
- MPS: Lustron Houses of Kansas MPS
- NRHP reference No.: 01000193
- Added to NRHP: March 2, 2001

The Stradal House, on N. 13th St. in Wa Keeney in Trego County, Kansas is a Lustron house which was listed on the National Register of Historic Places in 2001.

It is a one-story 31 by 35 feet (9.4 m × 10.7 m) house on a concrete slab foundation, built by Dreiling Implements of Hays, Kansas for John and Agnes Stradal.

It is an example of Lustron's two-bedroom Westchester Deluxe Plan model. As with other pre-fabricated Lustron models, it included built-in cabinets and bookshelves, and had exterior steel panels. In this example the exterior panels are "desert tan with white trim."

It was deemed worthy of NRHP listing "for its architecture and its significance as one of only a hundred Lustron houses extant in Kansas at the time of nomination."

It was listed on the National Register as part of a multiple property submission of Lustron houses in Kansas.
