= Bruce A. and June L. Elmore Lustron House =

Historic house in North Carolina, United States

- U.S. National Register of Historic Places
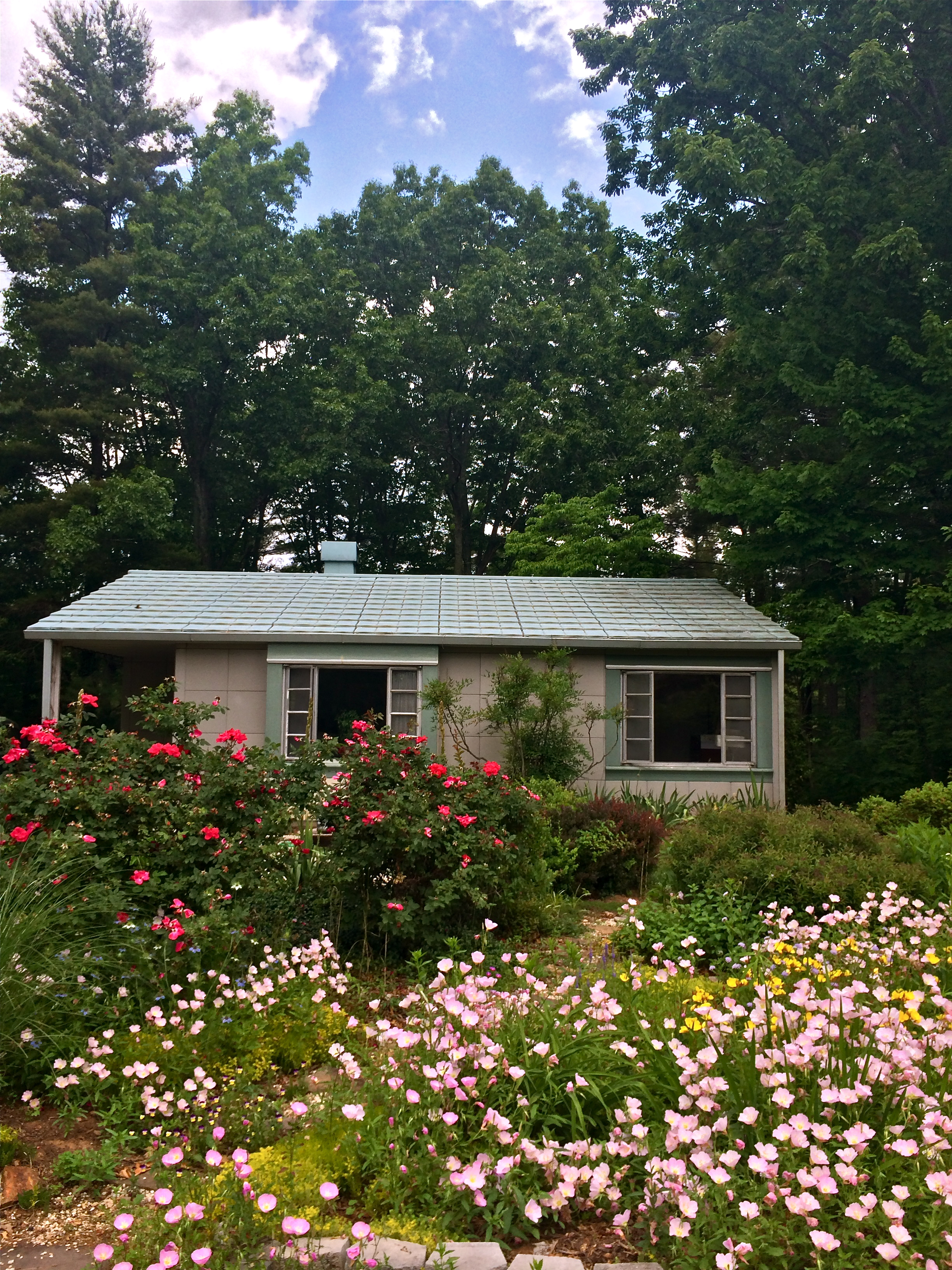

- Location within North Carolina Location within the United States
- Location: 70 Hampden Rd. Asheville, North Carolina
- Coordinates: 35°35′01″N 82°29′48″W
- Area: .81 acres (0.33 ha)
- Built: 1949, 1985
- Architectural style: Lustron house
- NRHP reference No.: 13000635
- Added to NRHP: August 27, 2013

Bruce A. and June L. Elmore Lustron House is a historic home located at Asheville, Buncombe County, North Carolina. It was built in 1949, and is a one-story, side-gable-roof Westchester Deluxe two- bedroom-model Lustron house. It is sheathed in dove grey and green enamel-finish steel panels. An addition was made to the house about 1985.

It was listed on the National Register of Historic Places in 2013.
