= Einar and Alice Borton House =

Historic house in Wisconsin, United States

- U.S. National Register of Historic Places
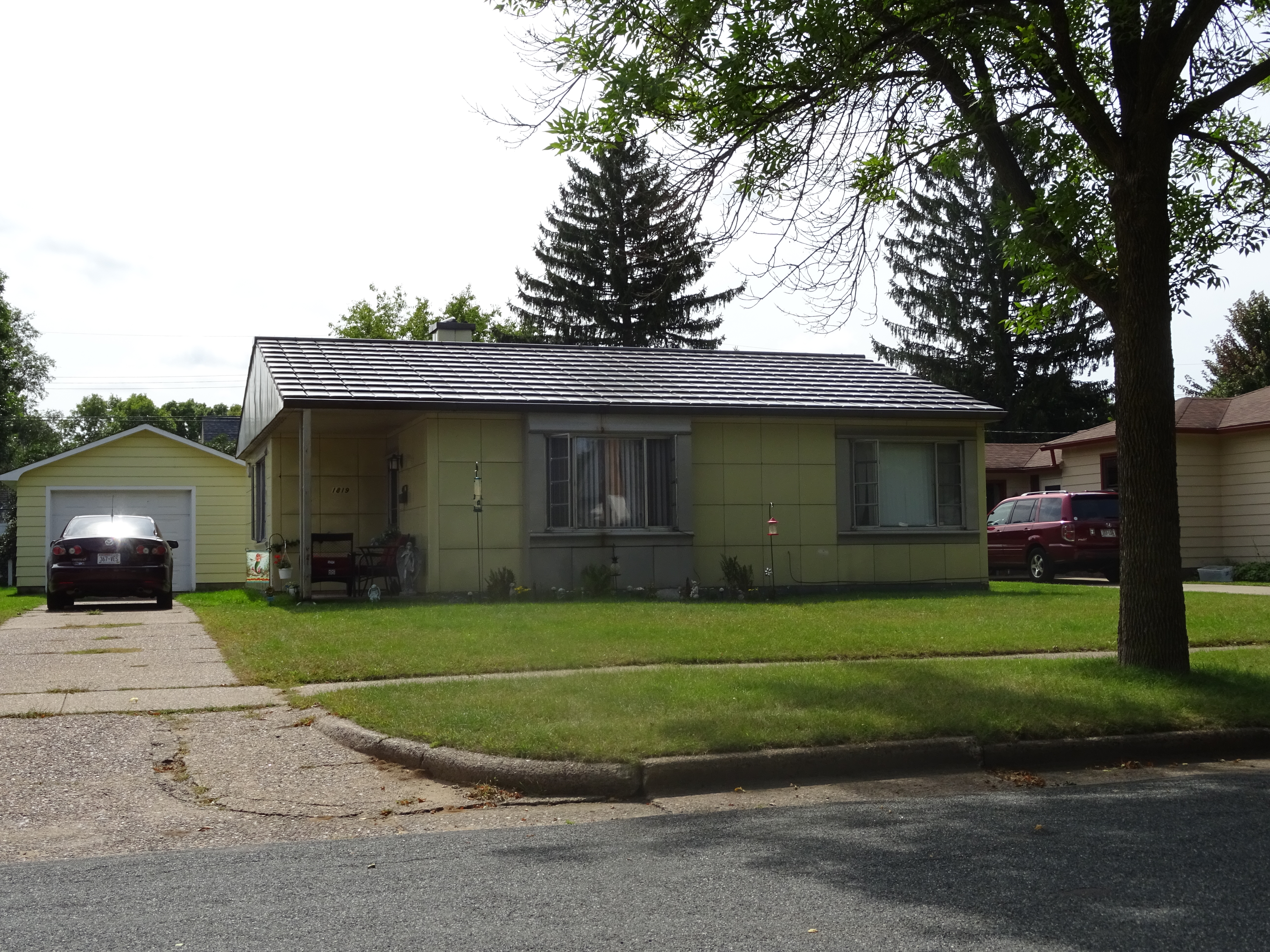
- Einar and Alice Borton House

- Location within Wisconsin Location within the United States
- Location: 1819 Lyndale Ave. Eau Claire, Wisconsin
- Coordinates: 44°48′23″N 91°28′31″W
- Built: 1949
- NRHP reference No.: 13000541
- Added to NRHP: July 23, 2013

The Einar and Alice Borton House is located in Eau Claire, Wisconsin.

== History ==
Einar Borton was a bank teller. This house, belonging to him and his wife, is a Lustron house. It was added to the State Register of Historic Places in 2012 and to the National Register of Historic Places the following year.
