= Justice at the Gate =

Evangelical Christian political organization

Justice at the Gate is an evangelical Christian political organization that advertises itself as "building the partnerships to mobilize Christians to pray effectively and vote righteously." It is currently based in San Antonio, Texas and is led by Alice Patterson.

Justice at the Gate sponsors prayer coordination campaigns in which participants pray for divine influence to sway federal court decisions. The program includes an "Adopt a Judge" campaign in which specific justices are selected as the objects of prayer campaigns.

The organization espouses a theological link between the United States and divine will, suggesting that persons and organizations in conflict with the United States, both historically and in the present, are in violation of that will. A major emphasis of the organization's activities is racial reconciliation. Justice at the Gate conducts prayer and educational seminars aimed at fostering "repentance" between Anglo and African Americans over historical wrongs such as slavery.

Though considered unconventional for a religious organization, Justice at the Gate enjoys close ties with many political figures in the Republican Party of Texas. The organization is affiliated with and publishes materials of David Barton, the party's Vice Chairman and an evangelical author. Patterson has also been invited to lead several prayer ceremonies at the party's annual convention.

Justice at the Gate activities in Texas have also attracted the participation of many elected officeholders including the state's governor, Rick Perry. Patterson was one of the major organizers of "The Response," a prayer meeting organized by Perry and held at Reliant Stadium in Houston.
