= William Bowen Lustron House =

Historic house in Alabama, United States

- U.S. National Register of Historic Places
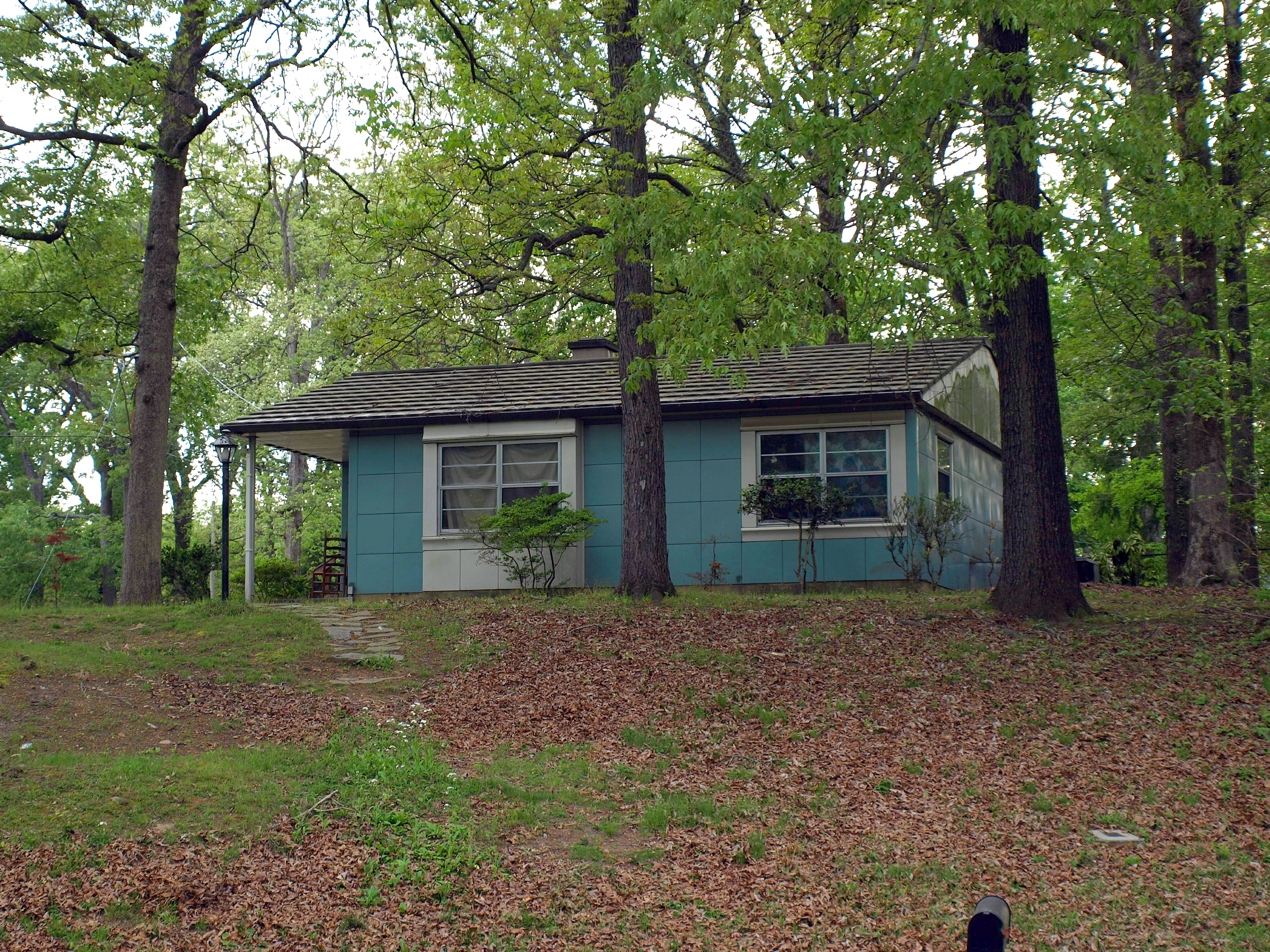
- The house in April 2017

- Location within Alabama Location within the United States
- Location: 1145 Wildwood Park Rd., Florence, Alabama
- Coordinates: 34°49′0″N 87°41′18″W
- Area: less than one acre
- Built: 1949
- Built by: Lustron Corporation
- Architect: Koch, Carl & Associates
- Architectural style: Lustron House
- MPS: Lustron Houses in Alabama, MPS
- NRHP reference No.: 00000135
- Added to NRHP: February 24, 2000

The William Bowen Lustron House is a historic residence in Florence, Alabama. The Lustron house was purchased by William Bowen in 1949. The prefabricated, metal frame house is one of the company's two-bedroom Westchester Deluxe models. The metal side-gable roof is painted brown to mimic ceramic tile. The house is clad with blue porcelain enamel panels with white window surrounds. The left window on the façade is a bay window that projects slightly from the house, differentiating the Deluxe model from the Standard. The southeast corner is recessed, forming an entry porch. The house was listed on the National Register of Historic Places in 2000.
