= McFadden House (Holton, Kansas) =

Historic house in Kansas, United States

- U.S. National Register of Historic Places
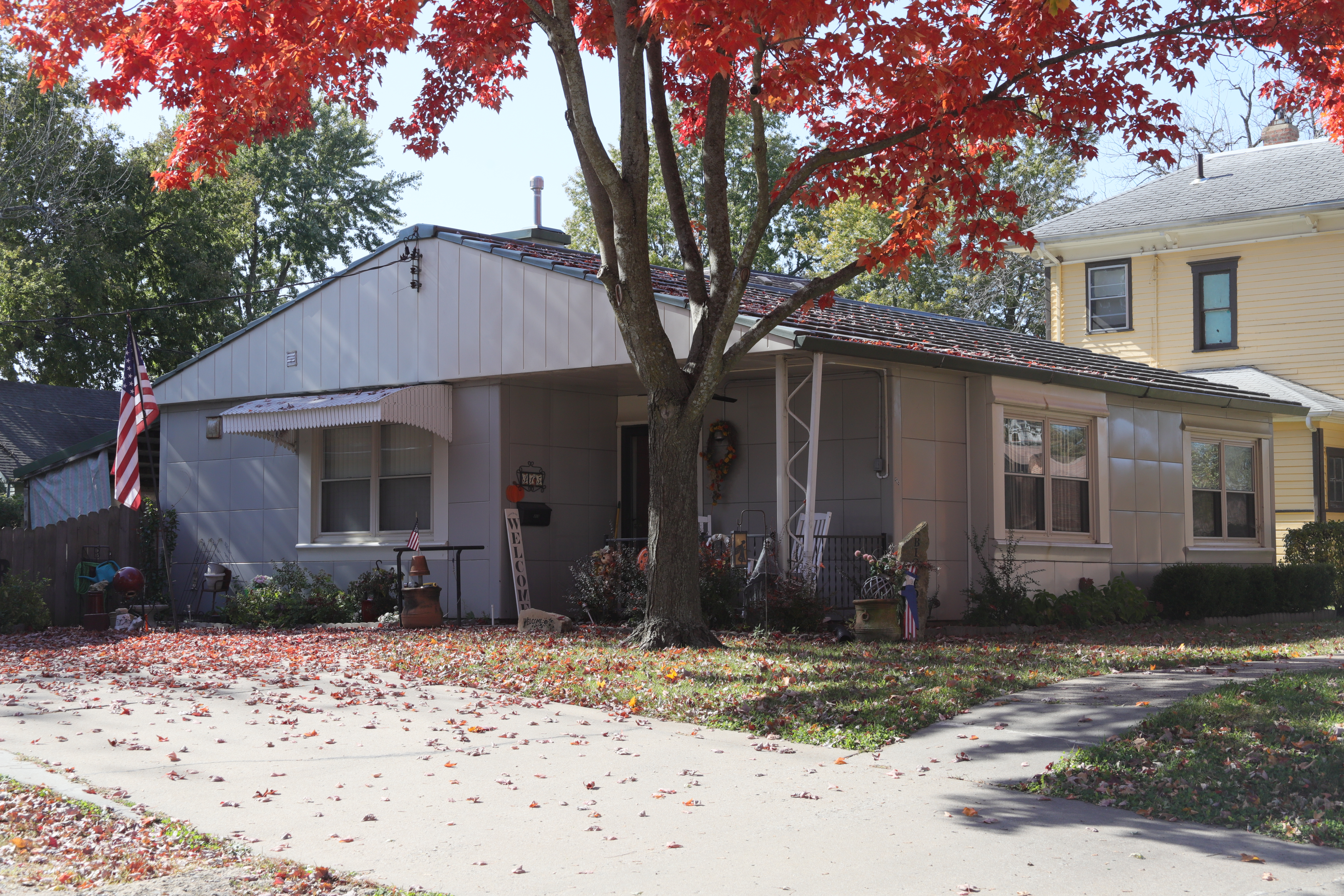
- McFadden House - a Lustron House

- Location within Kansas Location within the United States
- Location: 315 W. 5th St., Holton, Kansas
- Coordinates: 39°27′53″N 95°44′11″W
- Area: less than one acre
- Built: 1949
- Built by: Emery Construction, Topeka, KS
- Architectural style: Modern Movement, Westchester Deluxe Lustron
- MPS: Lustron Houses of Kansas MPS
- NRHP reference No.: 01000187
- Added to NRHP: March 2, 2001

The McFadden House is a Westchester Deluxe Plan model of Lustron house, which was built in 1949 at 315 W. 5th St. in Holton, Kansas. It was listed on the National Register of Historic Places in 2001.

Emery Construction of Topeka, Kansas, built it. It is "Dove Gray" and 31 by 35 feet (9.4 m × 10.7 m) in plan.

It was deemed notable as "an excellent example of the Lustron House property type, and it is one of only one hundred Lustron houses extant in Kansas. Only a few Lustrons were built in eastern Kansas, and this is the only Lustron in Jackson County."
