= Ooten House =

Historic house in Kansas, United States

- U.S. National Register of Historic Places
- Location within Kansas Location within the United States
- Location: 507 W 15th St., Larned, Kansas
- Coordinates: 38°11′21″N 99°06′14″W
- Area: less than one acre
- Built: 1950
- Built by: Brack Implements, Great Bend, KS; Ooten, Willard
- Architectural style: Modern Movement, Newport Deluxe Lustron
- MPS: Lustron Houses of Kansas MPS
- NRHP reference No.: 01000188
- Added to NRHP: March 2, 2001

The Ooten House, located at 507 W 15th St. in Larned, Kansas, is a Lustron house built in 1950. It was listed on the National Register of Historic Places in 2001.

It is a Newport Deluxe Lustron model, built by Brack Implements of Great Bend, Kansas. It was originally placed on land about 15 miles (24 km) outside Great Bend. It was moved to its current location some years later.
