= Patterson House (Larned, Kansas) =

Historic house in Kansas, United States

- U.S. National Register of Historic Places
- Location within Kansas Location within the United States
- Location: 841 W 8th St., Larned, Kansas
- Coordinates: 38°10′53″N 99°6′32″W
- Area: less than one acre
- Built: 1949
- Architect: Brack Implements, Great Bend, KS
- Architectural style: Modern Movement, Westchester Deluxe Lustron
- MPS: Lustron Houses of Kansas MPS
- NRHP reference No.: 01000189
- Added to NRHP: March 2, 2001

The Patterson House in Larned, Kansas is a three-bedroom Lustron house built in 1949. Together with its matching Lustron garage, it was listed on the National Register of Historic Places in 2001.

It was built by Great Bend, Kansas, Lustron dealer Don Brack in 1949 and would have cost somewhat more than $10,500. All exterior surfaces and walls and ceilings inside the house are porcelain enamel steel. It has an original built-in dining room china cabinet and pass-through to the kitchen, which identifies the house as a "Deluxe" edition of Lustron's Westchester house model. Other porcelain enamel built-in features include bookcases, a mirrored vanity, and closets and overhead storage.

It is a front-gabled, 31-by-39-foot (9.4 by 11.9 m) house with "Dove Gray" walls, white trim, and a green roof.

The two-car Lustron garage, like the house, is front-gabled and sits on a concrete slab foundation.

The property was deemed notable in 2001 as "an excellent and rare example of a three-bedroom Westchester Deluxe Lustron with an accompanying Lustron garage." A red brick wall holding an outdoor brick fireplace connects the house and garage and defines an outdoor patio area; this is compatible with intentions of Lustron designers for renovations to be added and does not detract from the historic integrity of the property.

The first owners, Harold and Alice Patterson, raised five children in the home. Donald and Joanne Reep bought the house in 1964. Mrs. Reep recalled taking the kitchen cabinets to an auto body shop to repair, after a kitchen fire, and appreciated the "'indestructible'" Lustron roof. In 2000, Mrs. Reep worked as a realtor in Larned, Kansas and reportedly knew at least one Lustron owner who valued the durability of Lustron houses for rental property.

Only about 2,500 Lustrons were ever manufactured.
