= Sample—Lindblaum House =

Historic house in South Dakota, United States

- Sample--Lindblaum House
- U.S. National Register of Historic Places
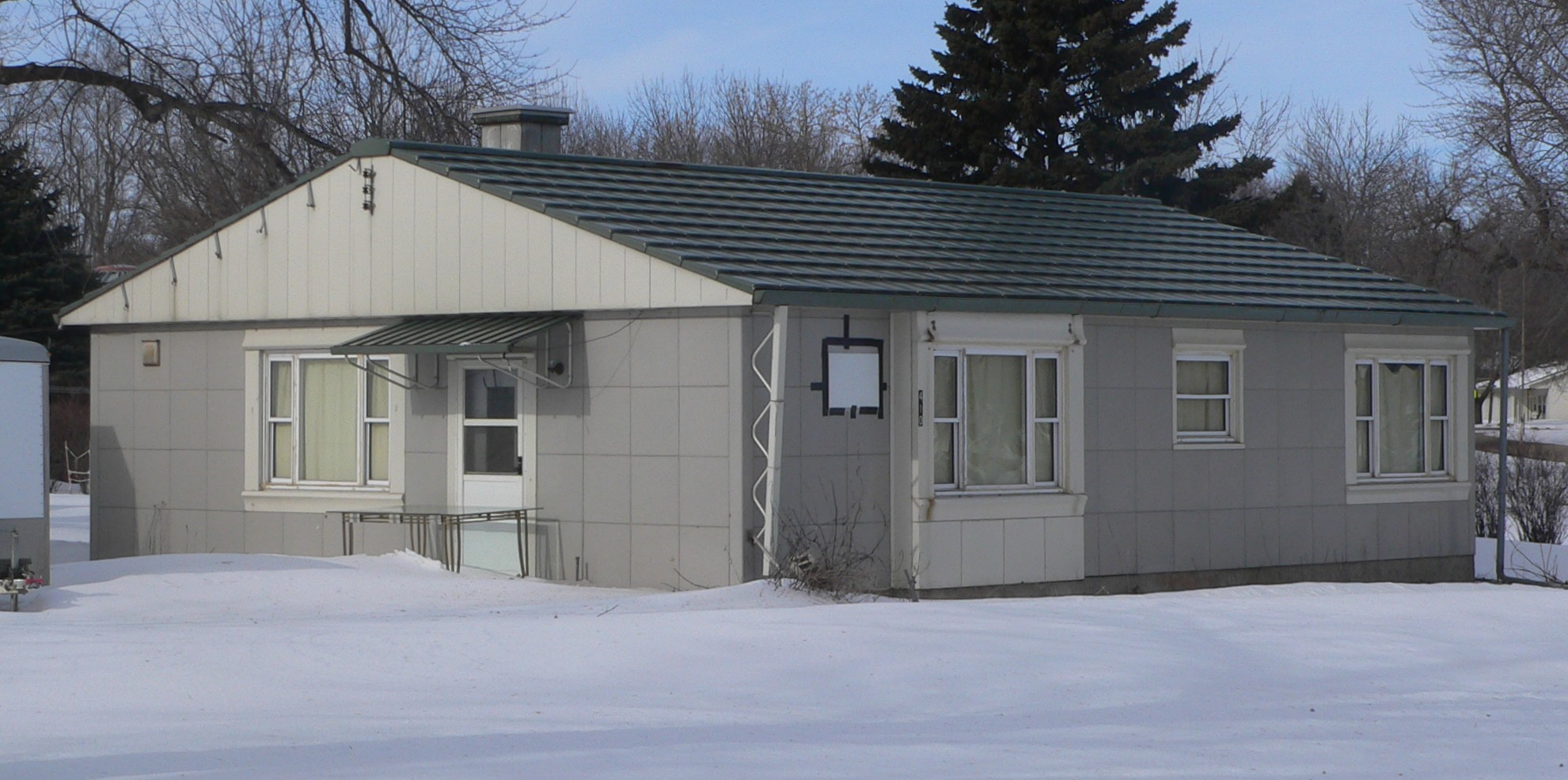
- The Sample—Lindblaum House in 2016

- Location within South Dakota Location within the United States
- Location: 410 Idaho St., Wakonda, South Dakota
- Coordinates: 43°00′48″N 97°06′24″W
- Area: less than one acre
- Built: 1948
- Architect: Roy Blass; Morris Beckman
- Architectural style: Lustron Westchester
- MPS: Lustron Houses in South Dakota MPS
- NRHP reference No.: 98001405
- Added to NRHP: December 2, 1998

The Sample—Lindblaum House, also spelled Sample—Lindblom House and alternatively known as the Odile Babb House, is a historic house in Wakonda, South Dakota. It is the only Lustron home in Wakonda. It was listed on the National Register of Historic Places in 1998.

== History ==
As World War II soldiers returned home following the war, the United States faced a nationwide housing shortage for the veterans and their families. Housing companies such as Lustron formed to mass-produce modular, affordable homes that could be quickly constructed. The Lustron Corporation, although short-lived (operating only from 1946 to 1950), built about 2,500 homes across the United States, including several in South Dakota. The Sample—Lindblaum House was built in 1948 by Glen and May Sample. Wakonda is a rural community, and this home was built on the outskirts of town; it is situated down a private driveway and is surrounded by alfalfa fields. In 1965, the house was sold to Erick Lindblaum; and in 1983, Odile Babb bought it. The house was listed on the National Register of Historic Places on December 2, 1998, as a well-preserved example of a surviving Lustron house in South Dakota.

== Architecture ==
The Sample—Lindblaum House is specifically a Westchester Deluxe model. As with all Luston homes, its walls are made of 2 by 2 feet (0.61 by 0.61 m) enameled steel and prefabricated porcelain panels. Its interior and exterior walls are gray (with the exception of the kitchen and bathroom, which are yellow), and the simple gabled roof is blue-green. It has asphalt tile floors on a concrete slab foundation and measures 31 by 39 feet (9.4 by 11.9 m). The main entrance sits on one of the house's short sides, under a metal canopy. The side gable of the roof is made of enameled porcelain, visually separating it from the rest of the wall. The signature Lustron spiral trellis sits on the building's exterior. The original windows were set in enameled porcelain and were mostly large picture windows with side casements, with some smaller double-hung sash windows interspersed. The living room featured a large bay window. However, all of the house's windows were replaced in 1997, although they preserved the original style. A noncontributing two-car garage is also on the property.

Inside, it has a kitchen, bathroom, living room, dining room, and three bedrooms on a single story. Lustron homes came pre-fitted with built-in storage cabinets and most appliances (except for a refrigerator and stove). Notable built-in features included bedroom closets, the kitchen and living room cabinets, a china cabinet between the dining room and kitchen, vanity and storage cabinets in the master bedroom, and a combination dishwasher and clothes washer in the kitchen. The interior doors are sliding pocket doors, also made from enameled steel; the front and back entrance doors are the only ones in the home that swivel. At the time of its NRHP listing, the asphalt tile floors had been covered with carpet, and only the dishwasher/clothes washer and the bathroom sink had been replaced. Lustron homes were fitted with paneled radiant heating systems; this house's heating system has been replaced, but it still uses the original heating system.
