= Harold Hess Lustron House =

Historic house in New Jersey, United States

- U.S. National Register of Historic Places
- New Jersey Register of Historic Places
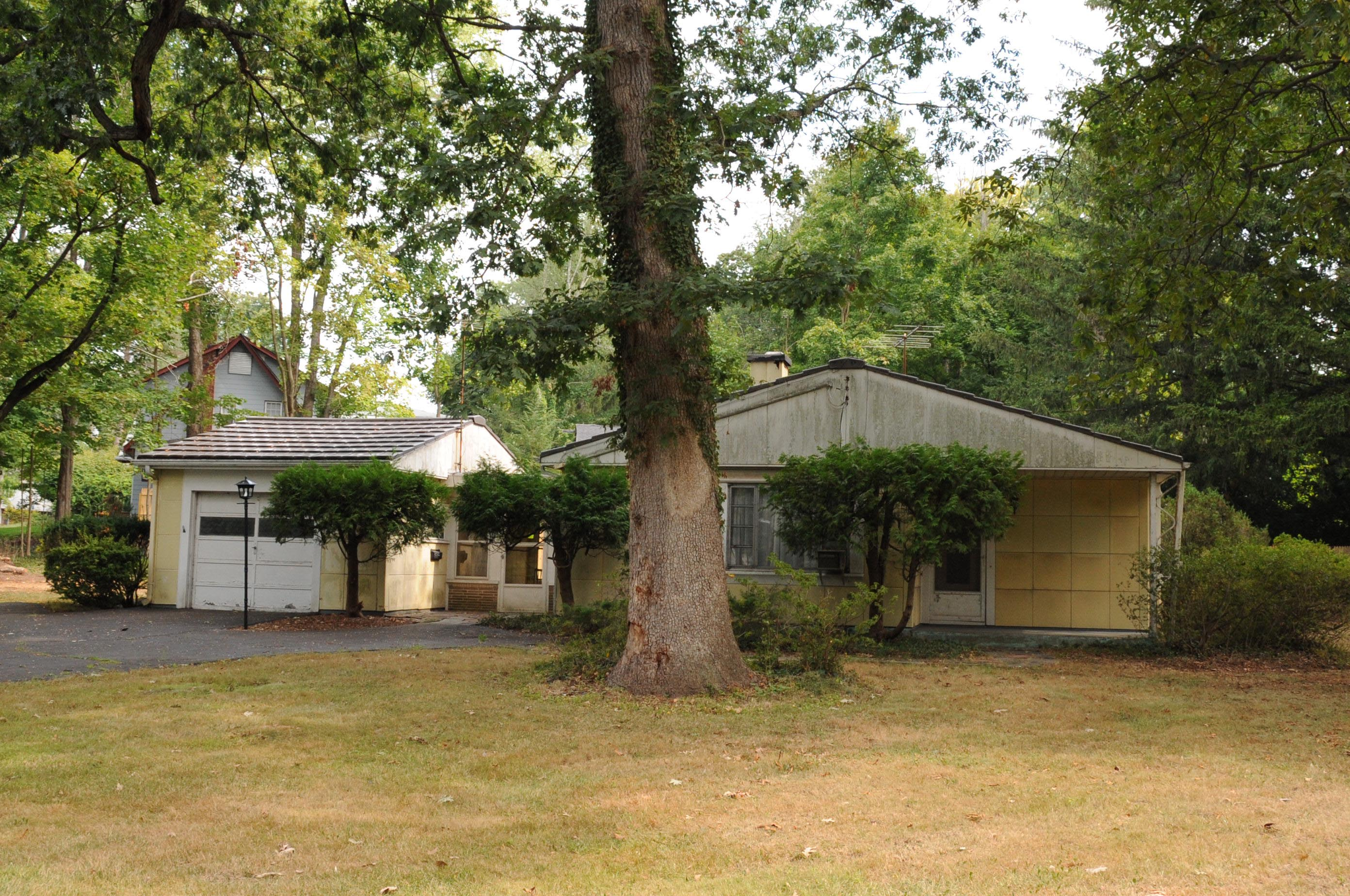

- Location within Bergen County, New Jersey Location within New Jersey Location within the United States
- Location: 421 Durie Avenue, Closter, New Jersey
- Coordinates: 40°58′15″N 73°58′2″W
- Built: 1950
- Built by: Better Living Homes Company
- Architect: Morris Beckman
- Architectural style: Westchester Deluxe plan
- MPS: Lustrons in New Jersey MPS
- NRHP reference No.: 00000796
- NJRHP No.: 3564

Significant dates
- Added to NRHP: July 25, 2000
- Designated NJRHP: May 30, 2000

The Harold Hess Lustron House is a Westchester Deluxe plan Lustron house located at 421 Durie Avenue in the borough of Closter in Bergen County, New Jersey, United States. Harold Hess, a World War II veteran, purchased it in 1950. Lustron houses were constructed using prefabricated porcelain enameled steel. The house was added to the National Register of Historic Places on July 25, 2000, for its significance in architecture and industry. It was listed as part of the Lustrons in New Jersey Multiple Property Submission (MPS), one of three originally built in the county. After threat of destruction the house was deeded to the town of Closter.

== See also ==
- National Register of Historic Places listings in Closter, New Jersey
- National Register of Historic Places listings in Bergen County, New Jersey
- William A. Wittmer Lustron House
- List of Lustron houses
