= Roy Blass =

American architect

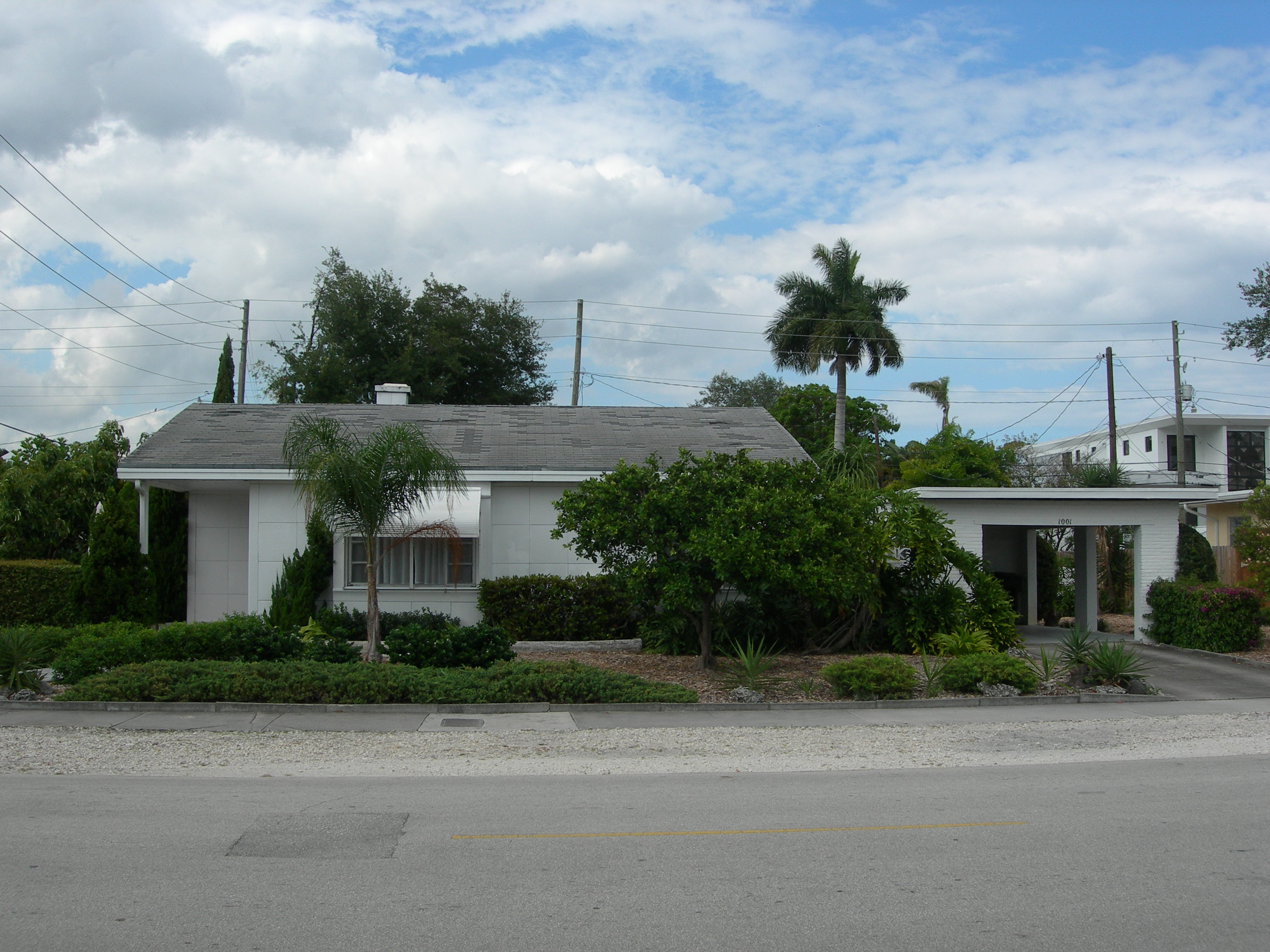
Alfred and Olive Thorpe Lustron House

Roy Blass was an American architect whose work included design of Lustron houses.

He designed many buildings that were later listed on the U.S. National Register of Historic Places for their architecture.

His works were done in three states which include:

== Georgia ==
- Jack and Helen Adams Lustron House, 832 Burchill St., SW., Atlanta, GA
- Thomas and Rae Epting Lustron House, 1692 Brewer Blvd., SW., Atlanta, GA
- Neville and Helen Farmer Lustron House, 513 Drexel Ave., Decatur, GA
- William and Ruth Knight Lustron House, 9166 Northside Dr., Atlanta, GA
- Lustron House at 1200 Fifth Avenue, 1200 Fifth Ave., Albany, GA
- Lustron House at 3498 McKenzie Drive, 3498 McKenzie Dr., Macon, GA
- Lustron House at 547 Oak Avenue, 547 Oak Ave., Americus, GA
- Lustron House at 711 Ninth Avenue, 711 Ninth Ave., Albany GA
- Russell and Nelle Pines Lustron House, 2081 Sylvania Dr., Decatur, GA

== South Dakota ==
- Bowden, Faye, House--Agnus Saunders 669 Dakota Ave. N., Huron, SD
- Peter Hansen House, 1123 E. Capitol St., Pierre, SD
- Orlan A. Hayward House, 1509 S. Glendale, Sioux Falls, SD
- Mack Jones House, 315 E 3rd Ave., Miller, SD
- Margaret and Vernon Moxon House, 1305 McDonald St., Huron SD
- Some or all properties in the Mitchell Lustron Historic District, Roughly along Vincent Place, from Miller Ave. to Mitchell Blvd., Mitchell, SD
- Maurice Nelson House, 101 E. Quincy St., Rapid City, SD
- Edbert and Josie Opitz House, 204 E. 2nd St., Redfield, SD
- Grant J. Reynolds House, 800 S. Hawthorne St., Sioux Falls, SD
- Sample-Lindblaum House, 410 Idaho St., Wakonda, SD

== Florida ==
- Alfred and Olive Thorpe Lustron House, 1001 NE. 2nd St., Fort Lauderdale, FL
