= Mary H. Matthews Lustron House =

Historic house in Arkansas, United States

- Formerly listed on the U.S. National Register of Historic Places
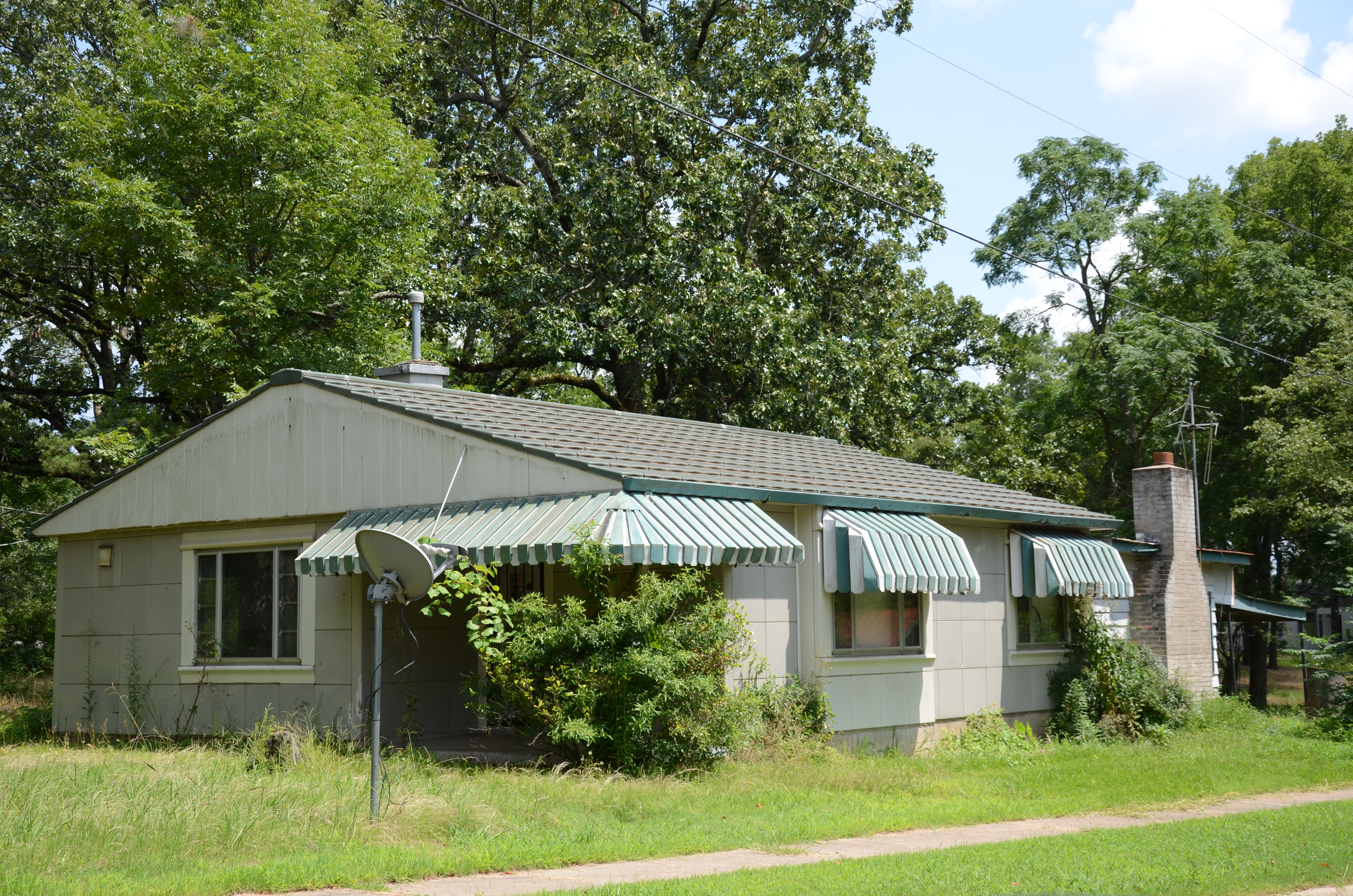

- Location within Arkansas Location within the United States
- Location: 5021 Maryland Ave., Little Rock, Arkansas
- Coordinates: 34°44′38″N 92°19′50″W
- Built: 1949
- Architect: Lustron Corporation
- Architectural style: Lustron house
- NRHP reference No.: 14000249

Significant dates
- Added to NRHP: May 23, 2014
- Removed from NRHP: September 8, 2020

The Mary H. Matthews Lustron House was a historic house at 5021 Maryland Avenue in Little Rock, Arkansas. It was a single-story prefabricated house, erected on site about 1949. It was one of four known surviving examples of a Lustron house in the state (out of twelve documented to be shipped into the state). These houses were prefabricated in Columbus, Ohio, and feature a steel frame clad in porcelain-enameled steel panels. The roof was also clad in similar panel and retained other original features.

The house was listed on the National Register of Historic Places in 2014. but was delisted in 2020 after it was demolished in October 2019.

== See also ==
- National Register of Historic Places listings in Little Rock, Arkansas
