= Lustron Houses of Jermain Street Historic District =

Historic district in Albany, New York, US

- Lustron Houses of Jermain Street; Historic District
- U.S. National Register of Historic Places
- U.S. Historic district
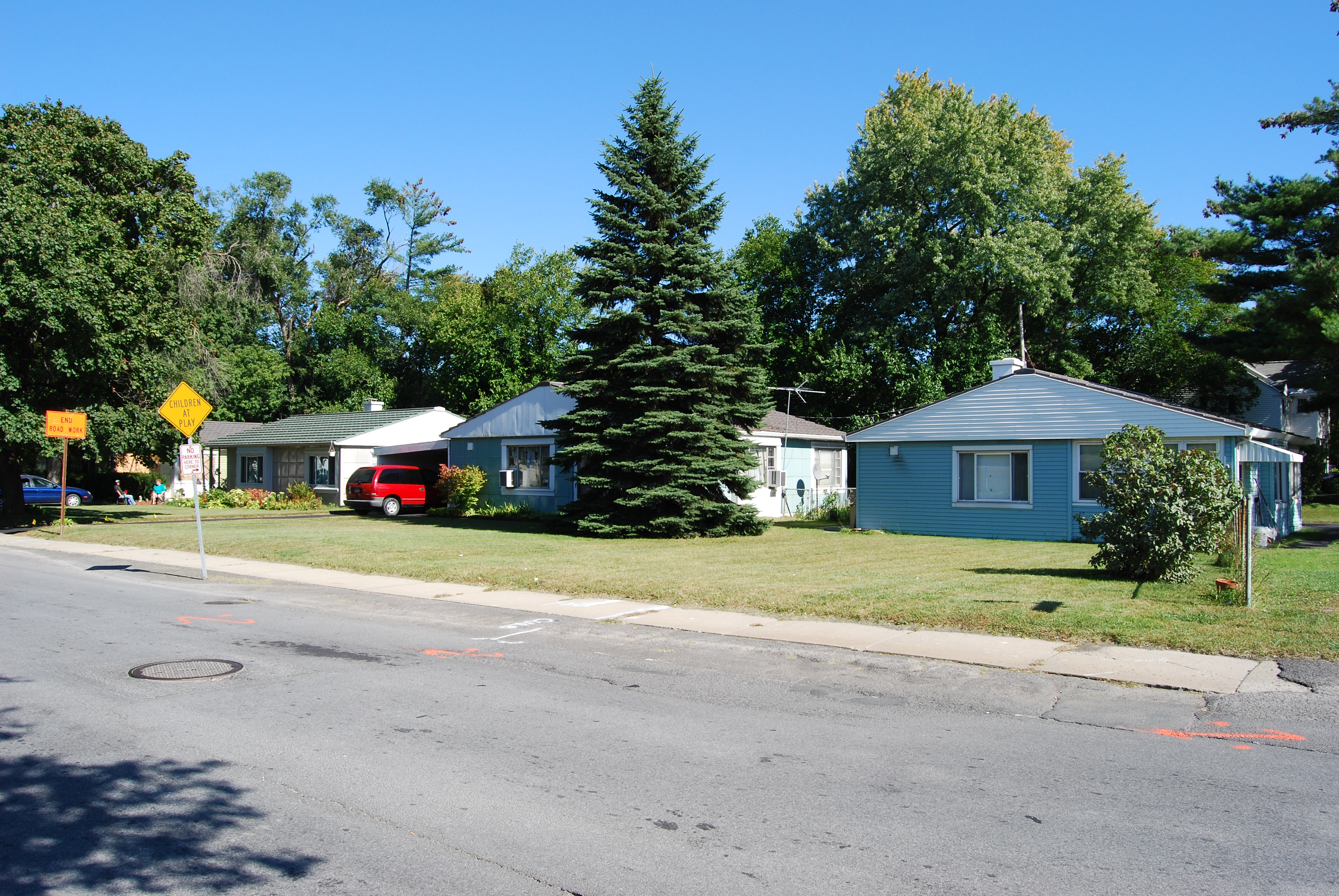
- 5, 3, and 1 Jermain Street, 2009

- Location within New York Location within the United States
- Location: Albany, NY
- Coordinates: 42°40′45.05″N 73°48′3.64″W
- Area: 0.72 acres (2,900 m^{2})
- Built: 1949
- Architect: Lustron Corporation
- Architectural style: Modern
- MPS: Lustron Houses in New York MPS
- NRHP reference No.: 09000572
- Added to NRHP: July 29, 2009

The Lustron Houses of Jermain Street Historic District is located along that street in Albany, New York, United States. It consists of five prefabricated homes built by the Lustron Corporation after World War II. It was recognized as a historic district and listed on the National Register of Historic Places in 2009.

Lustron's homes were used to provide inexpensive homes for veterans returning from the war. The company was never able to fully deliver on its early promises of high volume, and only produced the houses for a year. Many of the 2,600 that were produced remain today. The Jermain Street houses, four of which remain largely as they were when first manufactured, are the largest intact contiguous group in the state.

== Houses ==
The five houses, which are numbered 1, 3, 5, 7 and 8 Jermain Street, occupy lots averaging 0.15 acres (610 m^{2}) in size, for a total area of 0.72 acres (2,900 m^{2}). Four of the five are on the east side. All except 1 Jermain are intact enough to be considered contributing properties to the district's historic character.

Jermain Street is a short residential side street between Washington and Lincoln Avenues in the Melrose section of western Albany. The district is located near Jermain's southern terminus, where it intersects Washington immediately east of the overpass at the New York State Route 85 freeway, just south of Interstate 90. Beyond it on the south side of Washington, is the main campus of the State University of New York at Albany. Westland Hills Park is to the north. The neighborhoods to the east are predominantly residential, filled with houses built in the latter half of the 20th century.

The terrain is generally level and a few tall, mature trees grow amidst the houses. South of 8 Jermain Street, the west side of Jermain is vacant, sloping down to the freeway. The northern section of the street has small pattern houses in the Colonial Revival style.

All five houses in the district are one-story Westchester Deluxe models on concrete slab foundations, approximately 1,085 square feet (100.8 m^{2}) in area, sided in square porcelain enameled steel panels (except for 1 Jermain) with aluminum casement windows and topped with shallow-pitched gable steel roofs. Some have been altered or expanded; a detached garage built later is in the rear of 7 Jermain Street.

External videos
- Video of the Jermain Street Lustron houses

The southernmost of the houses is 1 Jermain Street, at the corner with Washington Avenue. It has had its exterior panels, originally in Lustron's Surf Blue color, replaced. The only aspect of the original building remaining is the roof and general form. It is therefore not considered a contributing property.

Next to it is 3 Jermain Street, which retains the same color paneling. It has been placed perpendicular to the street so its entrance is on the side. It has had an open carport added and its porch enclosed. Next door, 5 Jermain has had its Dove Gray panels partially painted. Windows have been replaced but are generally in keeping with the original. The porch has been enclosed with jalousie windows. The zigzag downspout, a distinctive Lustron touch, is intact.

At 7 Jermain, the house is parallel to the street. The porch has been similarly enclosed and the windows replaced with double-hung sash. Its paneling is Maize Yellow, and the zigzag downspout is still present. Additions have been made to the rear, and a detached concrete block garage has been built. Neither are considered contributing. The additions were slightly damaged in a 2009 fire. Across the street, 8 Jermain, in Desert Tan, retains many original features, but not the zigzag downspout.

== History ==
The Jermain Street Lustron houses were built as part of a larger group during the manufacturer's brief existence in 1949. In subsequent years, several were removed to make way for a road project, and various alterations were made to the houses themselves.

=== 1949–50: Construction ===
Carl Strandlund, an engineer with 150 patents, came up with the idea for enameled steel prefabricated homes during World War II, when he worked for a Chicago company that made vitreous enamel products, initially kitchenware, but later, architectural paneling used on some gas stations and restaurants, in particular, early White Castle outlets. After a conversation with Wilson Wyatt, director of the Federal Housing Administration (FHA), he set up the Lustron Corporation in 1947 with the help of $12 million ($173 million in modern dollars) in federal loans. President Harry S Truman, who had appointed Wyatt, was concerned about the possible shortage of housing, as many men were due to leave the military in the coming years with the war over, yet there had been virtually no new residential construction since it had started in 1941.

In Albany, the Upstate Construction Company was developing the Jermain and Victor Street blocks. In 1948, it ordered eight Lustron Westchester Deluxe houses for the former, a change from its original plans. The city at first denied a building permit for the homes, since there was no provision for prefabricated structures in its building code, but changed its mind on appeal in early 1949 after Upstate shared an FHA bulletin on the homes. The first two Lustron houses erected in Albany were 7 Jermain Street and 355 S. Main Street, both in expanding suburban areas of the city.

Lustron set up its first factory in a disused aircraft plant in Columbus, Ohio. It took until 1949 for the first house to come off the assembly line, designed by Strandlund to reduce the necessary production time from 1,600 man-hours to 350. Model homes were erected in several locations around the country, including midtown Manhattan, where 60,000 visitors toured it in two weeks. Deluxe editions included several pieces of built-in steel furniture, and a combination washing machine and dishwasher in the kitchen. The company boasted of their minimal maintenance, imperviousness to fire, flood, decay and vermin, and advertised them as "The House America's Been Waiting For" and "The House of Tomorrow".

The houses

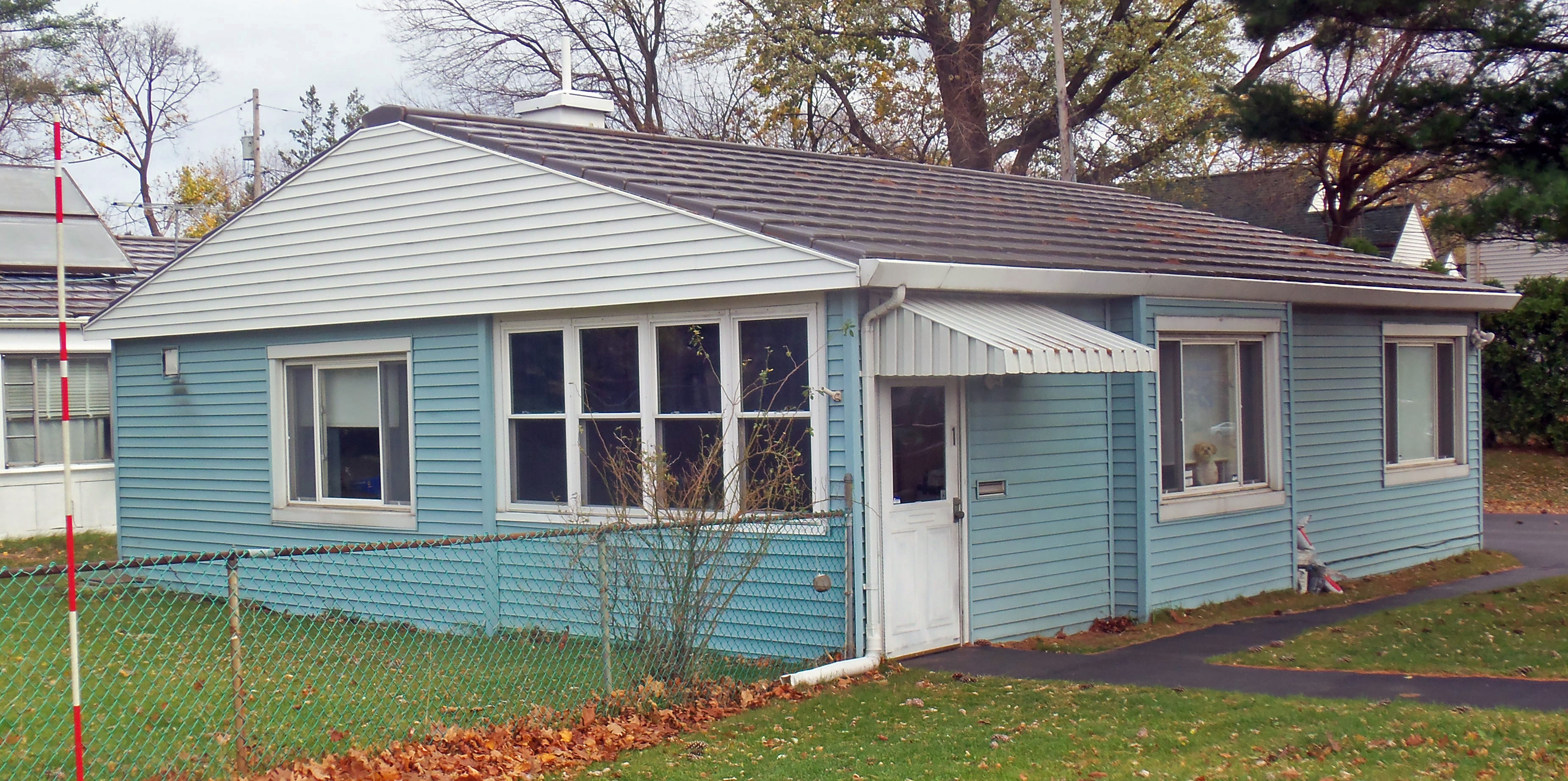
1 Jermain Street (non-contributing)

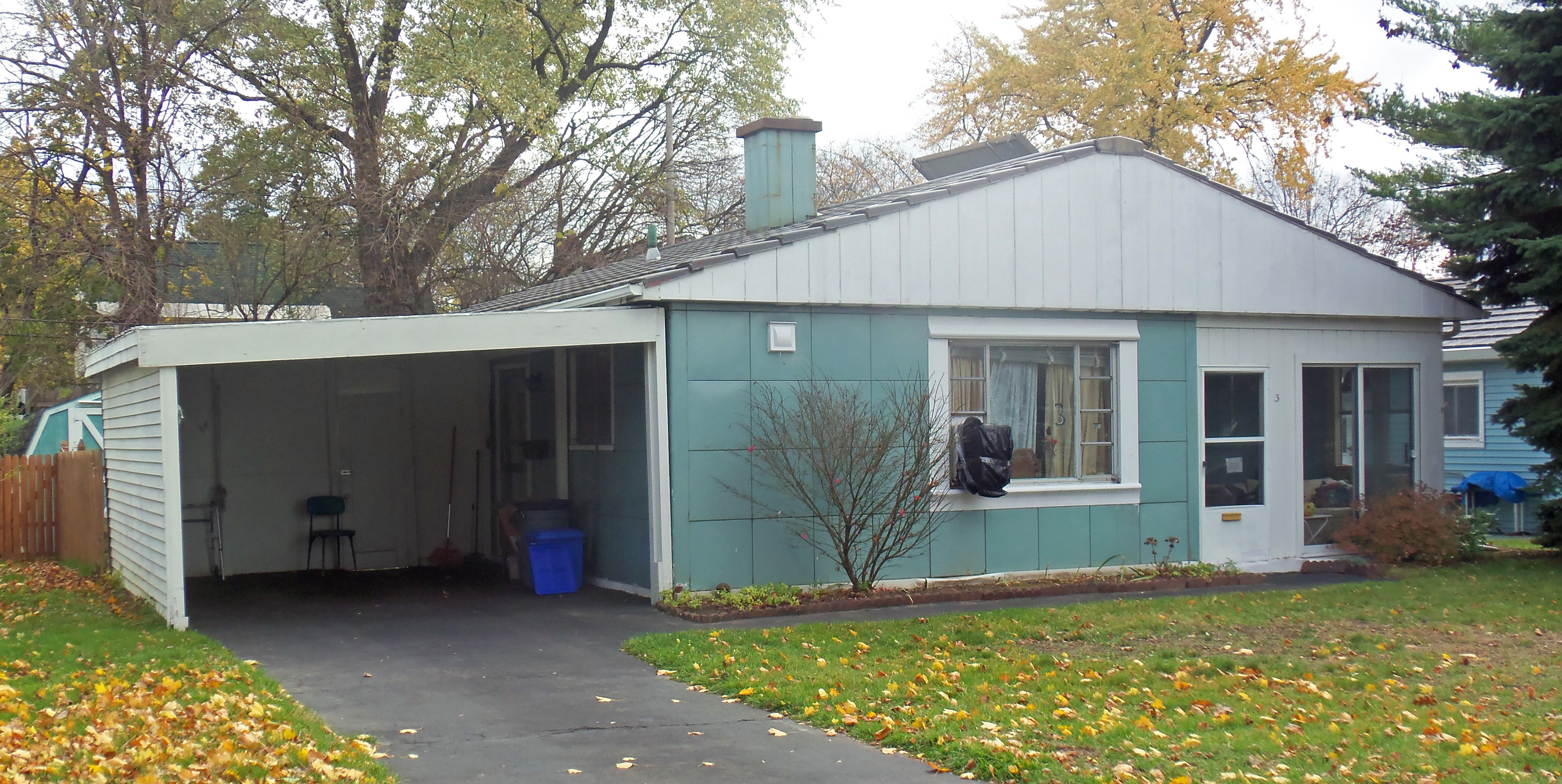
3 Jermain Street

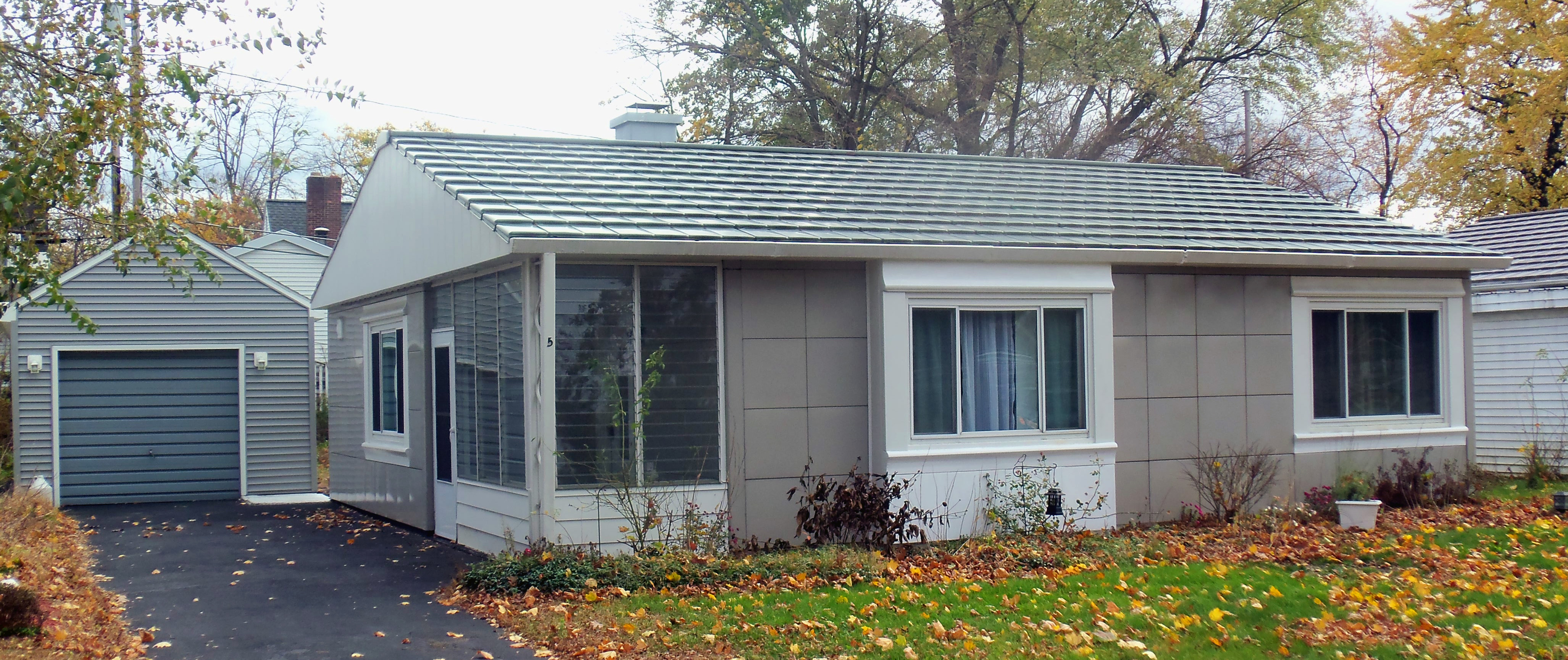
5 Jermain Street

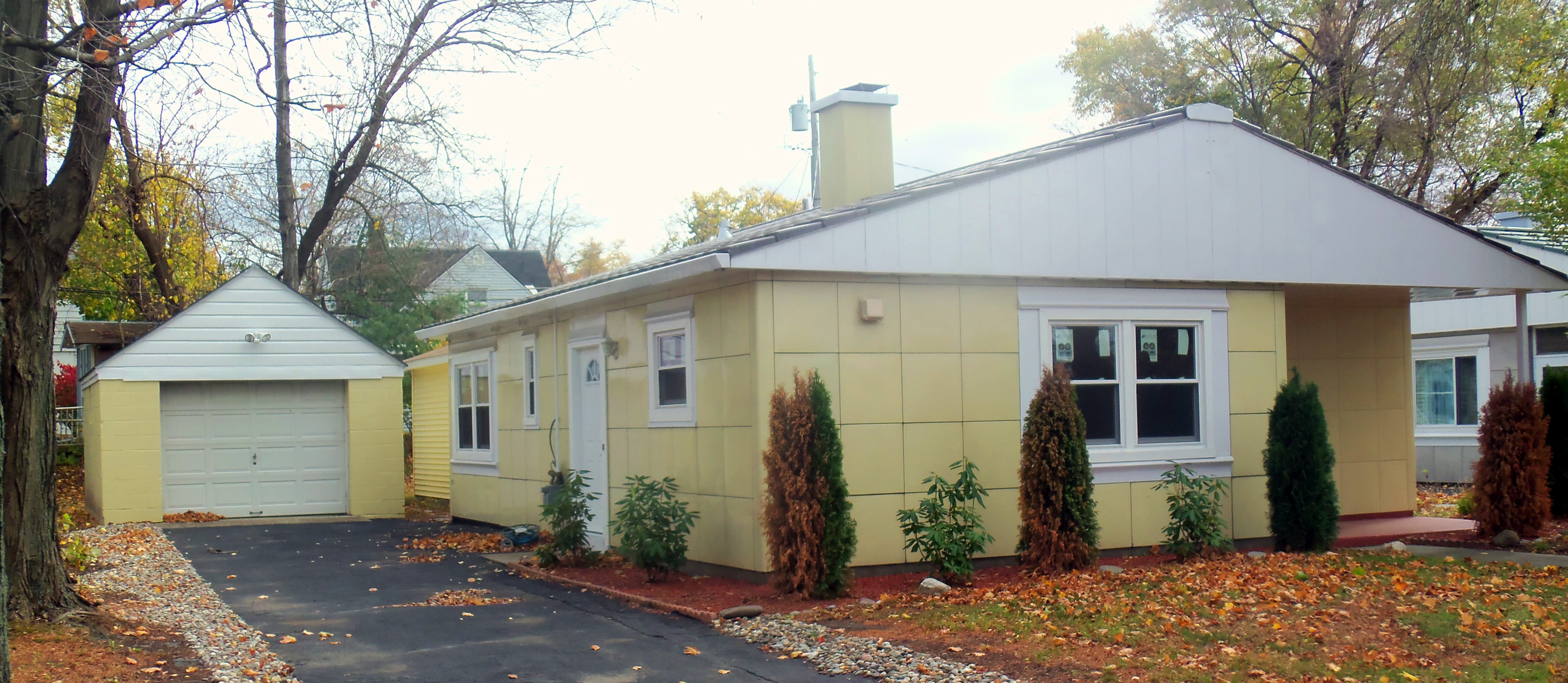
7 Jermain Street

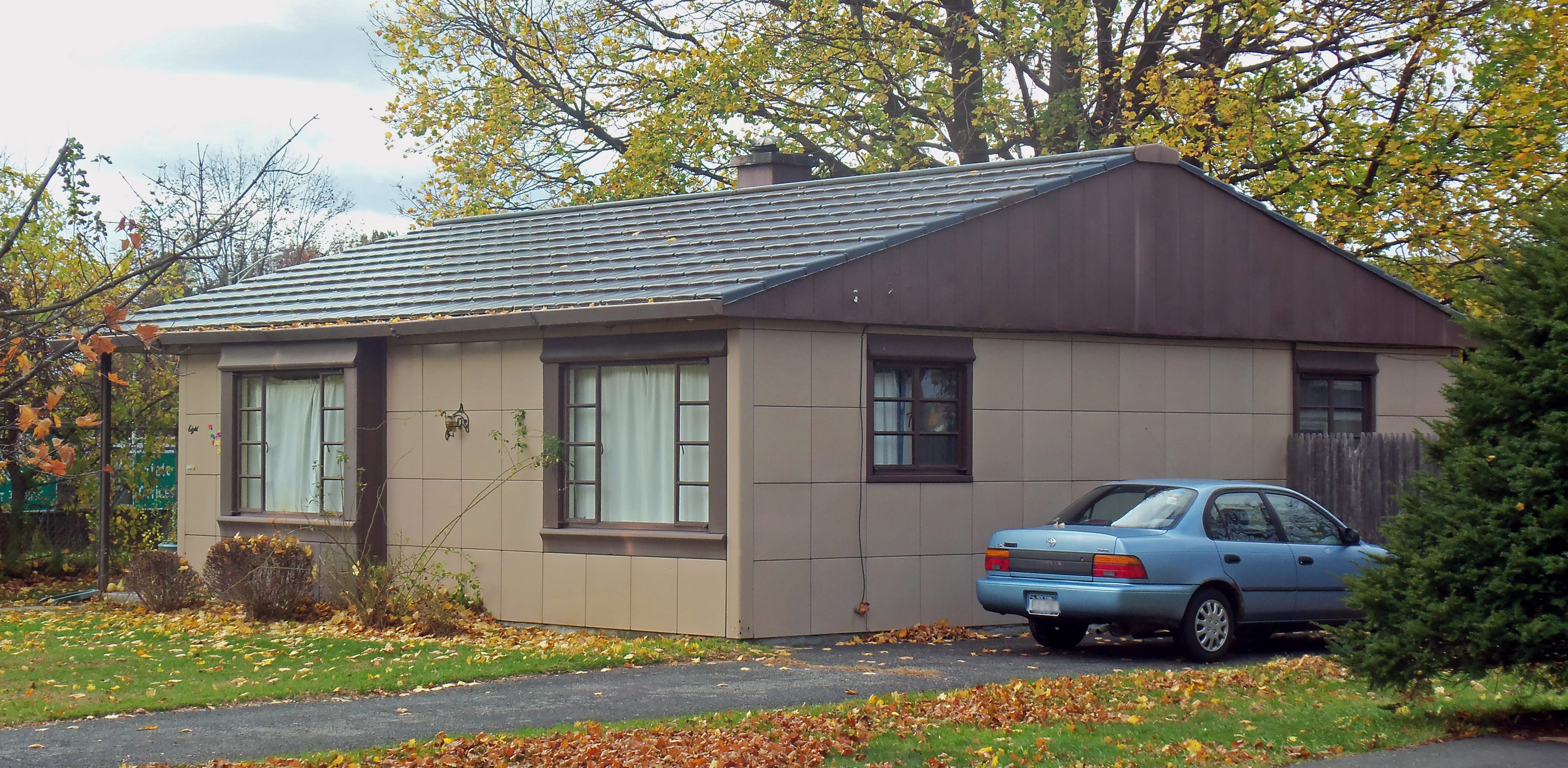
8 Jermain Street.

It sold homes through independent dealerships in a manner similar to automobile manufacturers. One was established in Albany; it is not clear if this was owned by Upstate or not. Dealers were required to pay Lustron in cash for the houses, then bear the costs of shipping themselves. The houses arrived on a truck specially designed for the purpose by Lustron on which the parts were stored in the order they would be unloaded for assembly. A trained crew of workers could put one up within a week.

The remaining seven Lustrons Upstate had bought for Jermain Street were all erected later in 1949. Nancy Danforth Norfleet, who moved into 8 Jermain as a young girl with her family, remembers she and her sister being teased by friends and schoolmates about living in a steel house. "They said if you forgot your house keys, you could use a can opener to get into the house." Her mother, she recalls, was sold on the house by the built-in steel furniture, particularly the vanity.

The Jermain Street Lustrons were profitable enough that the company bought another group for property it was developing in Loudonville, a northern suburb of Albany. One of its executives bought one for his own residence in East Greenbush, another suburb.

The heavy federal subsidies Lustron received put it under close scrutiny and criticism, especially from builders of traditional houses and the unions they employed. The company was unable to deliver either the volume or affordability Strandlund had promised. At its peak, the factory turned out 20 houses a day, far short of the hundred expected, and those houses cost $10,000 ($135,000 in modern dollars) apiece, more than a new timber frame house of the period rather the $6,500 ($88,000 in modern dollars) Strandlund had expected, a price that had to be added to the value of the underlying land. Its relations with dealers were also difficult, owing to the requirement dealers pay in cash and bear the shipping costs themselves.

Critical stories appeared in the press, and the diversification of the product line into smaller Newports and larger Meadowbrooks did not help the company's worsening situation. Early in 1950, a Senate committee held hearings on the problems faced by Lustron's dealers. Upstate, which had bucked the trend by making money on their Lustron developments to the point that they planned two more in Albany, sent a supportive telegram to be read into the record, saying it was prepared to build 300 Lustron houses in the coming year. If the company was allowed to continue, "success was assured", it said.

But Upstate's support did not stop the government from foreclosing on Lustron, to which it had by then loaned $37.5 million ($541 million in modern dollars). Production stopped in June of that year. Less than 2,600 Lustron houses had been shipped. Plans for two more Lustron enclaves along Hackett Boulevard in Albany were canceled, since the houses would never be built.

=== 1950–present: Neighborhood changes and preservation ===
After Lustron's demise, the houses on Jermain Street remained as the families that had moved into them grew. The properties evolved like any other houses. A detached concrete garage was added to the rear of 7 Jermain in 1952.

The most significant change to the neighborhood following the construction of the houses occurred in 1960. That year, as part of a larger scheme to expand the city of Albany's limited-access road network, in conjunction with the construction of Interstate 90 north of the city, Route 85 was expanded and extended into the western section of what was to be called the Crosstown Arterial. The construction of the freeway and its interchange with Washington Avenue required taking the property at 2, 4 and 6 Jermain Street. The full freeway scheme was never completed, but the eminent domain proceedings for the three lots were completed in 1961.

Instead of being demolished, the houses were moved elsewhere. One is on Pinehurst Avenue, a few blocks away. Another is believed to have been moved to Adams Avenue in Cohoes, north of Albany. The third has not been accounted for.

In 1966 and 1970, the expansions were built on the rear of 7 Jermain. At 3 Jermain, the porch was enclosed in 1981. The other alterations were made to the other houses at some point during the late 20th century. Nancy Norfleet inherited the house at 8 Jermain from her father, and eventually bought 5 Jermain as well, where her son lives. At the end of the 20th century, as Lustron houses became an object of renewed interest and historic preservation efforts, she has served as a source about the neighborhood and the houses.

== See also ==
- List of Lustron houses
- National Register of Historic Places listings in Albany, New York
