= William A. Wittmer Lustron House =

Historic house in New Jersey, United States

- U.S. National Register of Historic Places
- New Jersey Register of Historic Places
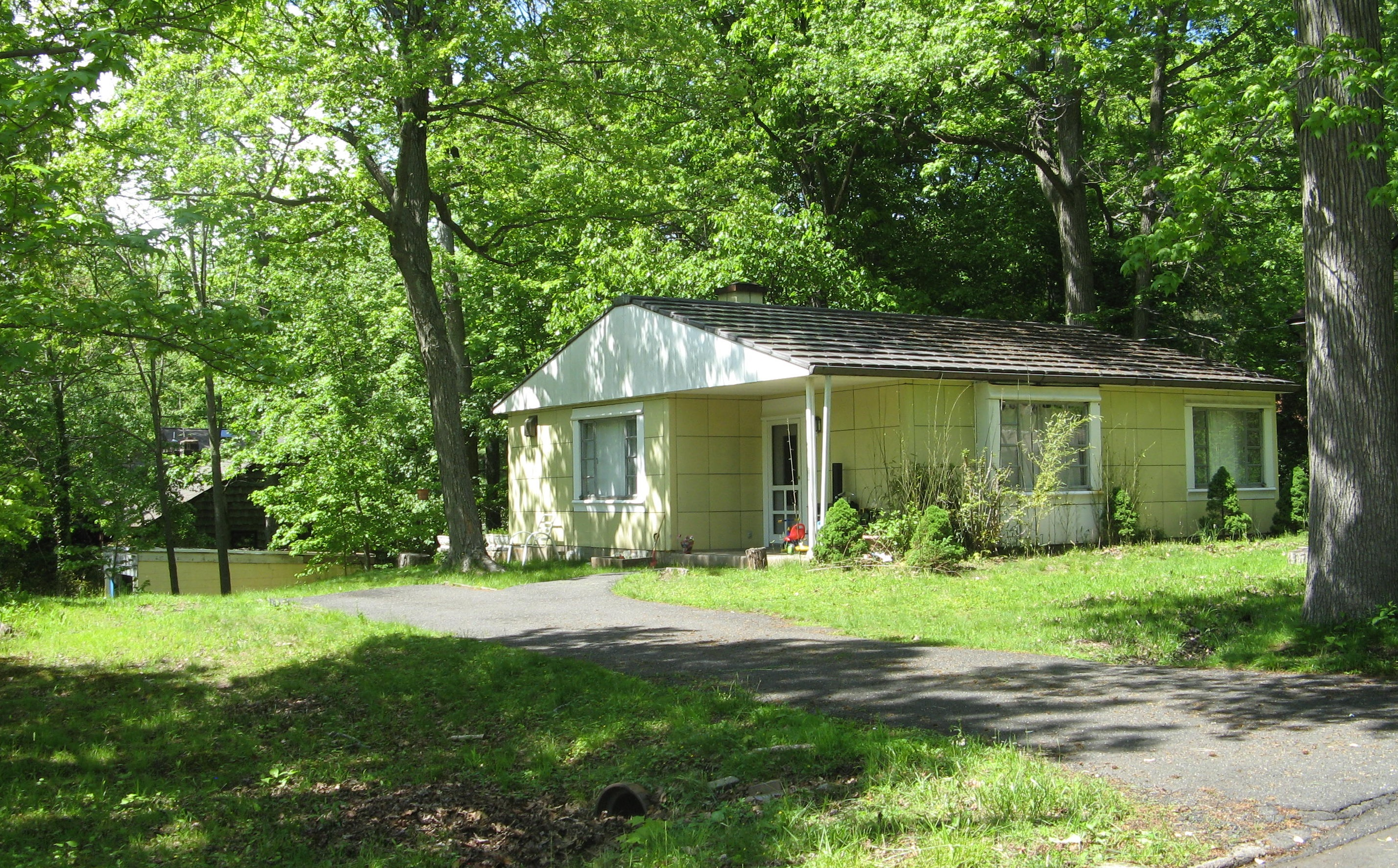
- William A. Wittmer Lustron House in May 2011

- Location within Bergen County, New Jersey Location within New Jersey Location within the United States
- Location: 19 Dubois Avenue, Alpine, New Jersey
- Coordinates: 40°56′50″N 73°55′44″W
- Built: 1949
- Architectural style: Westchester Deluxe plan
- MPS: Lustrons in New Jersey MPS
- NRHP reference No.: 00000797
- NJRHP No.: 3565

Significant dates
- Added to NRHP: July 25, 2000
- Designated NJRHP: May 30, 2000

The William A. Wittmer Lustron House, also known as the Majorie Hiorth Lustron House, is a Westchester Deluxe plan Luston house located at 19 Dubois Avenue in the borough of Alpine in Bergen County, New Jersey, United States. The house was built in 1949 and was added to the National Register of Historic Places on July 25, 2000, for its significance in architecture and industry. It was listed as part of the Lustrons in New Jersey Multiple Property Submission (MPS), one of three originally located in the county.

Lustron houses were constructed using prefabricated porcelain enameled steel. William A. Wittmer, an engineer, purchased the house in 1949. Marjorie Hiorth purchased it in 1967.

== See also ==
- National Register of Historic Places listings in Bergen County, New Jersey
- Harold Hess Lustron House
- List of Lustron houses
