= Farmer House =

Farmer House may refer to:

(sorted by state, then city/town)

- Farmer-Goodwin House, Tempe, Arizona, listed on the National Register of Historic Places (NRHP) in Maricopa County
- Neville and Helen Farmer Lustron House, Decatur, Georgia, listed on the NRHP in DeKalb County
- J.E. Farmer House, Wichita, Kansas, listed on the NRHP in Sedgwick County
- Kimball Farmer House, Arlington, Massachusetts, listed on the NRHP in Middlesex County
- Farmer House (Carthage, Missouri), listed on the NRHP in Jasper County
- Farmer House (Deatonville, Virginia), listed on the NRHP in Amelia County

== See also ==
- Farm House (disambiguation)
