= Morris Beckman =

Morris Beckman is the name of:

- Morris Beckman (architect), American architect
- Morris Beckman (writer) (1921–2015), English writer
