= Farmhouse (disambiguation) =

A farmhouse is a rural house.

Farmhouse may also refer to:

- Farmhouse (album), by Phish, 2000
- Farmhouse (film), a 2008 film directed by George Bessudo
- Farmhouse (group), a group of well-known Australian TV actors
- FarmHouse, a social fraternity

== See also ==
- Farm House (disambiguation)
