= Abram Demaree House =

Historic house in New Jersey, United States

- U.S. National Register of Historic Places
- New Jersey Register of Historic Places
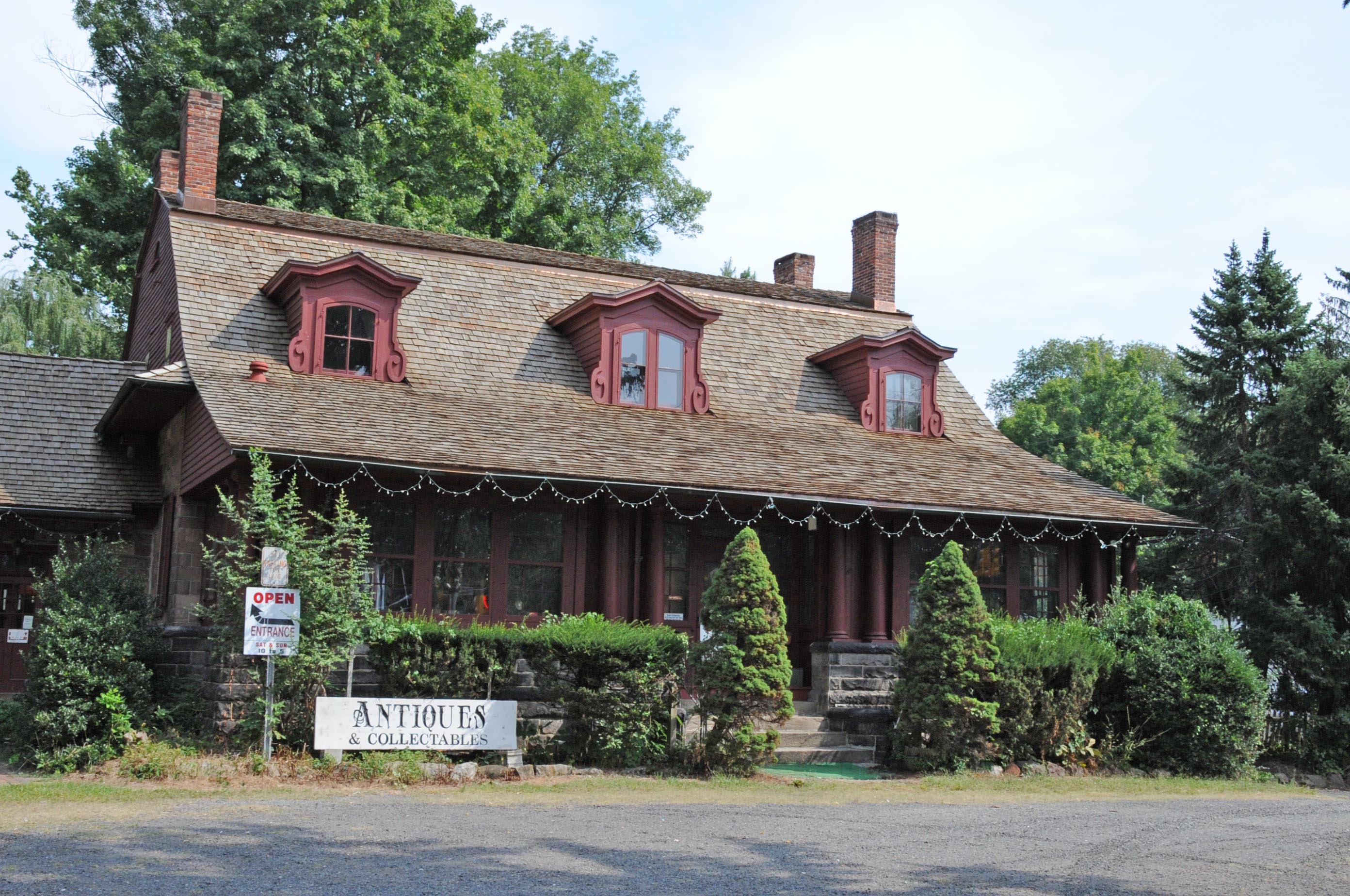

- Location within Bergen County, New Jersey Location within New Jersey Location within the United States
- Location: 45 Old Hook Road, corner of Schraalenburgh and Old Hooks Roads, Closter, New Jersey
- Coordinates: 40°58′35″N 73°58′53″W
- Area: 1.5 acres (0.61 ha)
- Built: 1760s
- Architectural style: Colonial, Dutch Colonial, Federal
- NRHP reference No.: 79001471
- NJRHP No.: 439

Significant dates
- Added to NRHP: November 1, 1979
- Designated NJRHP: July 21, 1979

The Abram Demaree House is a historic Dutch Colonial house located at 45 Old Hook Road in the borough of Closter in Bergen County, New Jersey, United States. The oldest part of the sandstone house was built from 1760 to 1769 by Abram Demaree. It was expanded in 1809 with a two-story Federal style main section built by his son David A. Demaree. The house was added to the National Register of Historic Places on November 1, 1979, for its significance in architecture and exploration/settlement. It was listed as part of the Early Stone Houses of Bergen County Multiple Property Submission (MPS).

== See also ==
- National Register of Historic Places listings in Closter, New Jersey
- National Register of Historic Places listings in Bergen County, New Jersey
