= David and Cornelius Van Horn House =

- U.S. National Register of Historic Places
- New Jersey Register of Historic Places
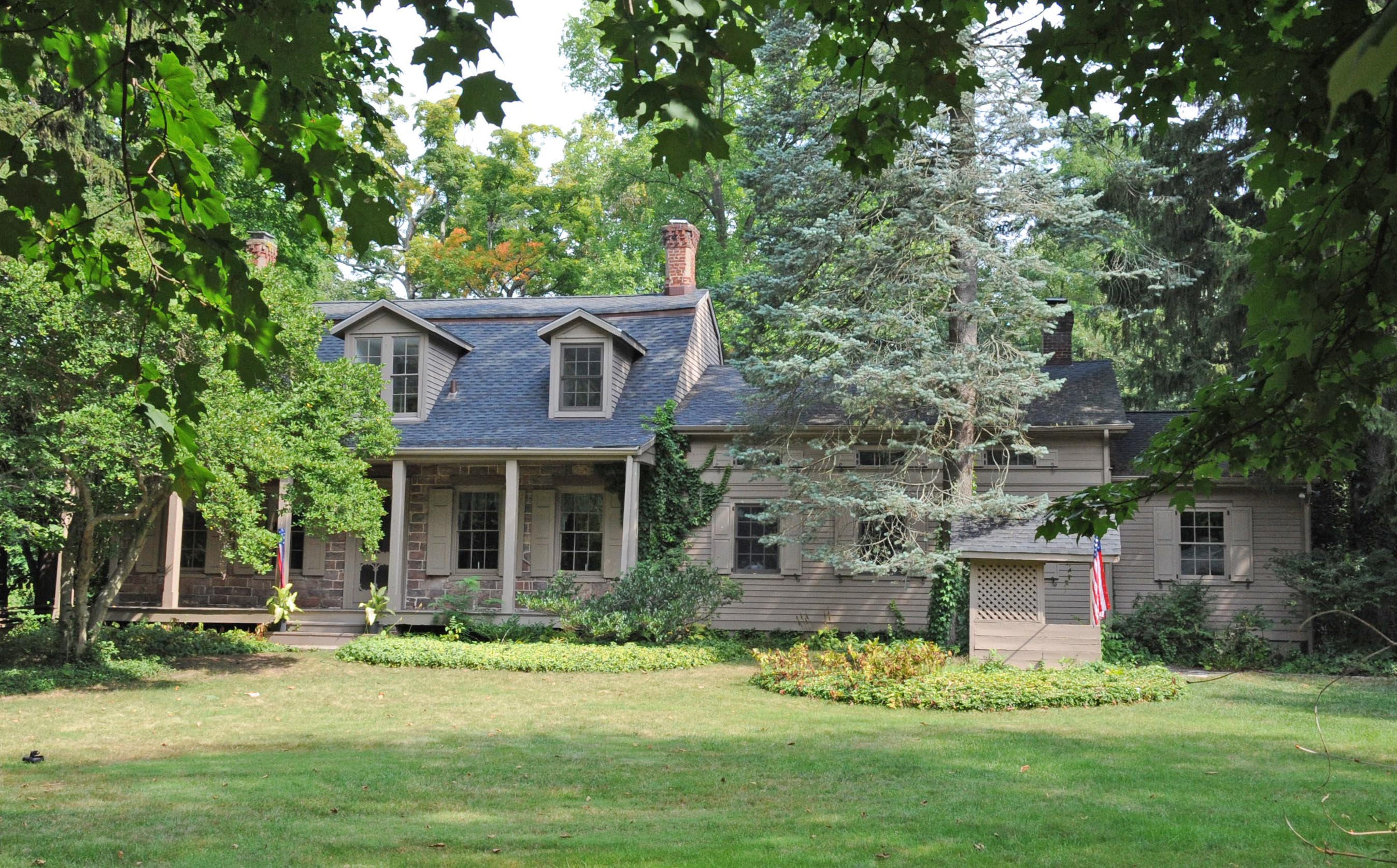

- Location within Bergen County, New Jersey Location within New Jersey Location within the United States
- Location: 11 Cedar Lane, Closter, New Jersey
- Coordinates: 40°58′37″N 73°58′50″W
- Built: c. 1778
- MPS: Stone Houses of Bergen County TR
- NRHP reference No.: 83001572
- NJRHP No.: 446

Significant dates
- Added to NRHP: January 9, 1983
- Designated NJRHP: October 3, 1980

The David and Cornelius Van Horn House is located at 11 Cedar Lane in the borough of Closter in Bergen County, New Jersey, United States The historic stone house was built around 1778 and was added to the National Register of Historic Places on January 9, 1983, for its significance in architecture. It was listed as part of the Early Stone Houses of Bergen County Multiple Property Submission (MPS).

According to the nomination form, the farm was confiscated and sold to Henry Folks (Volk) in 1779. Christian Van Horn purchased it in 1800 for his son David Van Horn. After his death, it passed to his son, Cornelius Van Horn.

== See also ==
- National Register of Historic Places listings in Closter, New Jersey
- National Register of Historic Places listings in Bergen County, New Jersey
