= National Register of Historic Places listings in Closter, New Jersey =

Map of Bergen County, New Jersey, highlighting Closter

List of the National Register of Historic Places listings in the borough of Closter in Bergen County, New Jersey

Contents: Counties and communities in New Jersey
Atlantic – Bergen (Closter, Franklin Lakes, Ridgewood, Saddle River, Wyckoff) – Burlington – Camden – Cape May – Cumberland – Essex – Gloucester – Hudson – Hunterdon – Mercer – Middlesex – Monmouth – Morris – Ocean – Passaic – Salem – Somerset – Sussex – Union – Warren

The table below includes 10 sites listed on the National Register of Historic Places in the borough of Closter in Bergen County, New Jersey. Latitude and longitude coordinates of the sites listed on this page may be displayed in an online map.

This National Park Service list is complete through NPS recent listings posted November 6, 2026.

== Current listings ==
	Name on the Register	Image	Date listed	Location	Description
1	William De Clark House	William De Clark House	January 9, 1983 (#83001488)	145 Piermont Road; 40°58′41″N 73°56′40″W	Part of the Early Stone Houses of Bergen County Multiple Property Submission (MPS)
2	Abram Demaree House	Abram Demaree House	November 1, 1979 (#79001471)	45 Old Hook Road, Schraalenburgh and Old Hooks Roads; 40°58′35″N 73°58′53″W	Part of the Early Stone Houses of Bergen County MPS
3	Haring–Auryanson House	Haring–Auryanson House	August 15, 1983 (#83001516)	377 Piermont Road; 40°58′17″N 73°56′53″W	Part of the Early Stone Houses of Bergen County MPS
4	Harold Hess Lustron House	Harold Hess Lustron House	July 25, 2000 (#00000796)	421 Durie Avenue; 40°58′15″N 73°58′02″W	Part of the Lustrons in New Jersey MPS
5	John Nagle House	John Nagle House	January 9, 1983 (#83001534)	75 Harvard Street; 40°58′46″N 73°56′27″W	Part of the Early Stone Houses of Bergen County MPS, also known as the John Naugle House
6	Henry Naugle House	Henry Naugle House	January 9, 1983 (#83001535)	119 Hickory Lane; 40°58′24″N 73°56′26″W	Part of the Early Stone Houses of Bergen County MPS
7	Isaac Naugle House	Isaac Naugle House	January 9, 1983 (#83001537)	80 Hickory Lane; 40°58′21″N 73°56′34″W	Part of the Early Stone Houses of Bergen County MPS
8	Tallman–Vanderbeck House	Tallman–Vanderbeck House	January 9, 1983 (#83001551)	639 Piermont Road; 40°57′59″N 73°57′15″W	Part of the Early Stone Houses of Bergen County MPS
9	David and Cornelius Van Horn House	David and Cornelius Van Horn House	January 9, 1983 (#83001572)	11 Cedar Lane; 40°58′37″N 73°58′50″W	Part of the Early Stone Houses of Bergen County MPS
10	Vervalen House	Vervalen House	January 9, 1983 (#83001580)	151 West Street; 40°58′43″N 73°57′50″W	Part of the Early Stone Houses of Bergen County MPS
