= Isaac Naugle House =

- U.S. National Register of Historic Places
- New Jersey Register of Historic Places
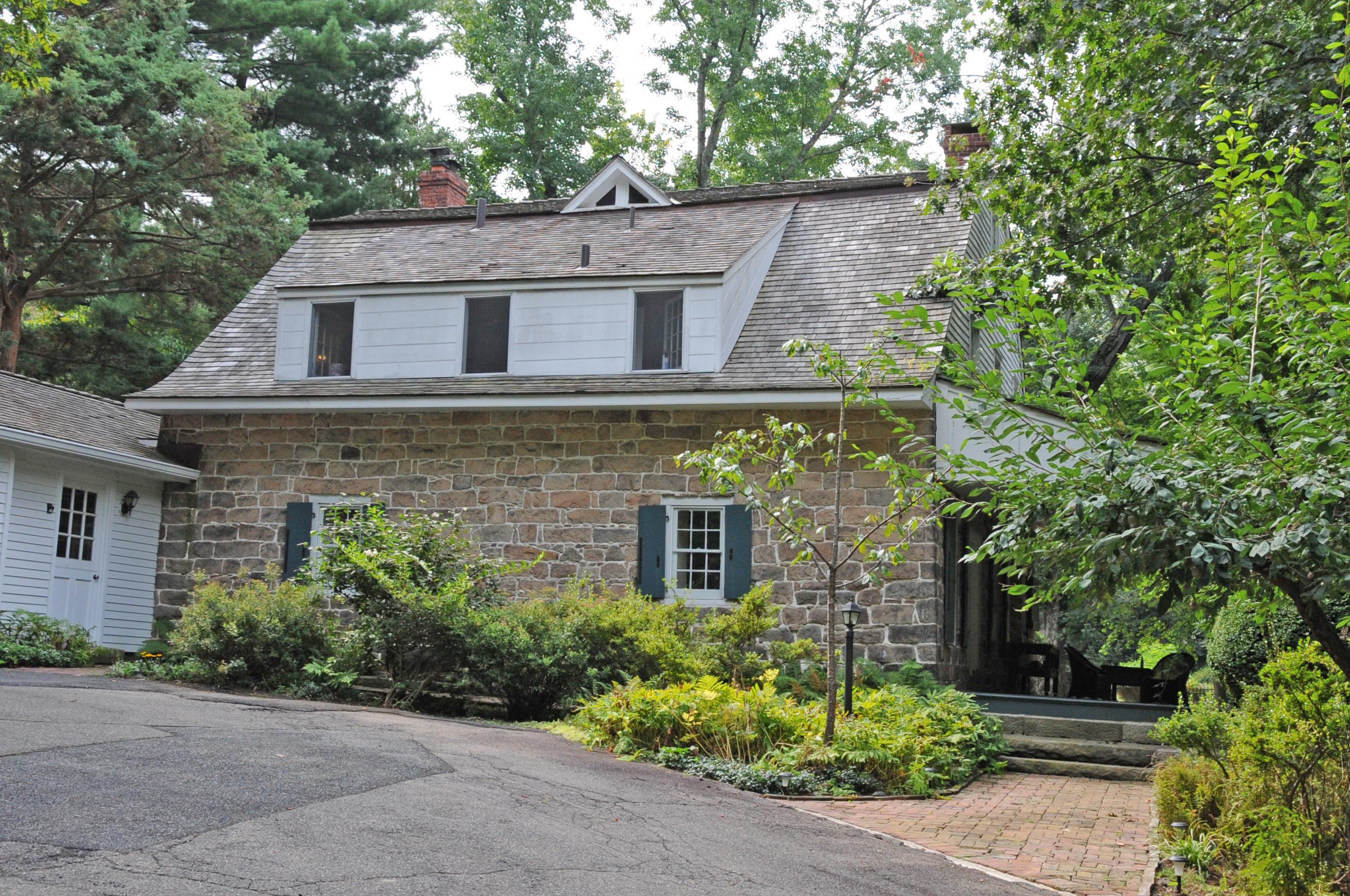

- Location within Bergen County, New Jersey Location within New Jersey Location within the United States
- Location: 80 Hickory Lane, Closter, New Jersey
- Coordinates: 40°58′21″N 73°56′34″W
- Area: 1.9 acres (0.77 ha)
- Built: 1775
- MPS: Stone Houses of Bergen County TR
- NRHP reference No.: 83001537
- NJRHP No.: 443

Significant dates
- Added to NRHP: January 9, 1983
- Designated NJRHP: October 3, 1980

The Issac Naugle House is located at 80 Hickory Lane in the borough of Closter in Bergen County, New Jersey, United States. The historic stone house was built in 1775 and was added to the National Register of Historic Places on January 9, 1983, for its significance in architecture. It was listed as part of the Early Stone Houses of Bergen County Multiple Property Submission (MPS).

According to the nomination form, Hendrick Naugle had owned land here. In 1745 he married Catherine Blauvelt, and they had four daughters and three sons, John, Isaac and Barent. Isaac Naugle built the house here in 1775.

== See also ==
- National Register of Historic Places listings in Closter, New Jersey
- National Register of Historic Places listings in Bergen County, New Jersey
- Henry Naugle House
