= Haring–Auryanson House =

- U.S. National Register of Historic Places
- New Jersey Register of Historic Places
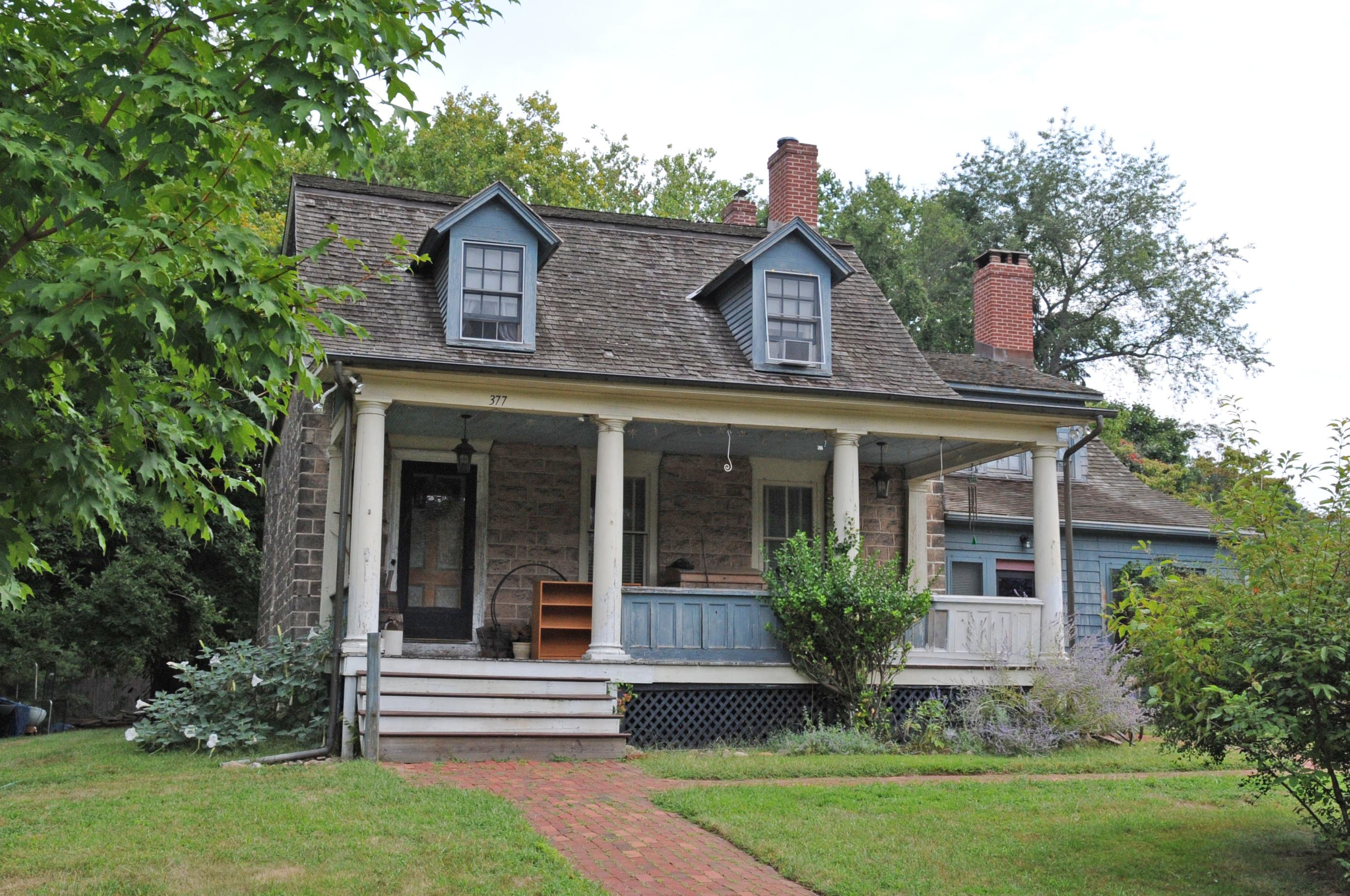

- Location within Bergen County, New Jersey Location within New Jersey Location within the United States
- Location: 377 Piermont Road, Closter, New Jersey
- Coordinates: 40°58′17″N 73°56′53″W
- Area: 3.2 acres (1.3 ha)
- Architectural style: Federal
- MPS: Stone Houses of Bergen County TR
- NRHP reference No.: 83001516
- NJRHP No.: 441

Significant dates
- Added to NRHP: August 15, 1983
- Designated NJRHP: October 3, 1980

The Haring–Auryanson House is located at 377 Piermont Road in the borough of Closter in Bergen County, New Jersey, United States. The historic stone house was added to the National Register of Historic Places on August 15, 1983, for its significance in architecture and exploration/settlement. It was listed as part of the Early Stone Houses of Bergen County Multiple Property Submission (MPS).

According to the nomination form, the house was built around 1793, or maybe later, based on architectural evidence. It was owned by David Haring in 1834 and by J. Auryanson in 1861.

== See also ==
- National Register of Historic Places listings in Closter, New Jersey
- National Register of Historic Places listings in Bergen County, New Jersey
