= Henry Naugle House =

- U.S. National Register of Historic Places
- New Jersey Register of Historic Places
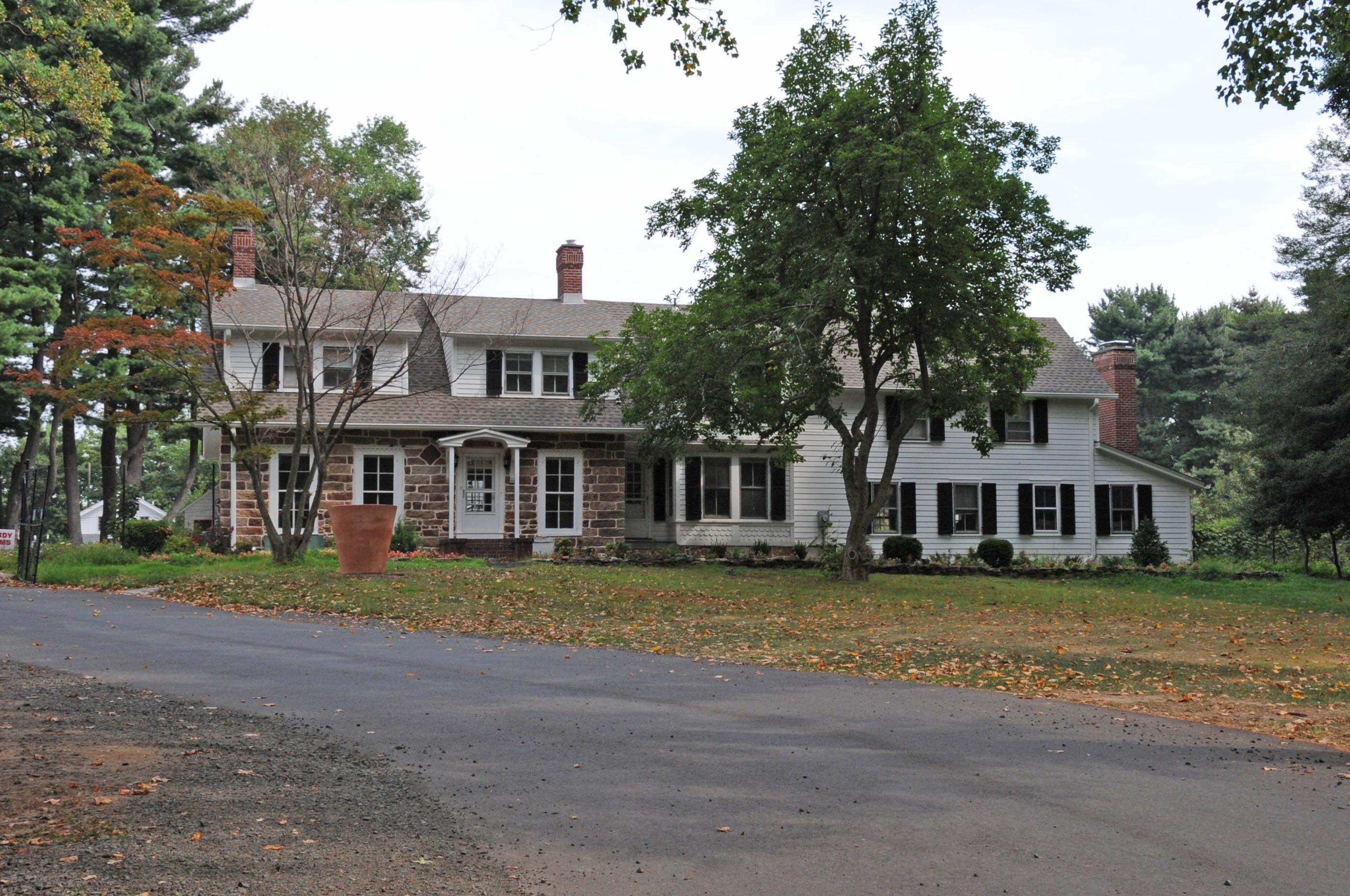

- Location within Bergen County, New Jersey Location within New Jersey Location within the United States
- Location: 119 Hickory Lane, Closter, New Jersey
- Coordinates: 40°58′24″N 73°56′26″W
- Area: 7.9 acres (3.2 ha)
- MPS: Stone Houses of Bergen County TR
- NRHP reference No.: 83001535
- NJRHP No.: 442

Significant dates
- Added to NRHP: January 9, 1983
- Designated NJRHP: October 3, 1980

The Henry Naugle House is located at 119 Hickory Lane in the borough of Closter in Bergen County, New Jersey, United States. The historic stone house was added to the National Register of Historic Places on January 9, 1983, for its significance in architecture. It was listed as part of the Early Stone Houses of Bergen County Multiple Property Submission (MPS).

The house was built in 1736 by tradition, but around 1750 to 1760 based on architectural evidence. It has been expanded by a two and one-half story Victorian wing.

== See also ==
- National Register of Historic Places listings in Closter, New Jersey
- National Register of Historic Places listings in Bergen County, New Jersey
- Isaac Naugle House
