= Vervalen House =

- U.S. National Register of Historic Places
- New Jersey Register of Historic Places
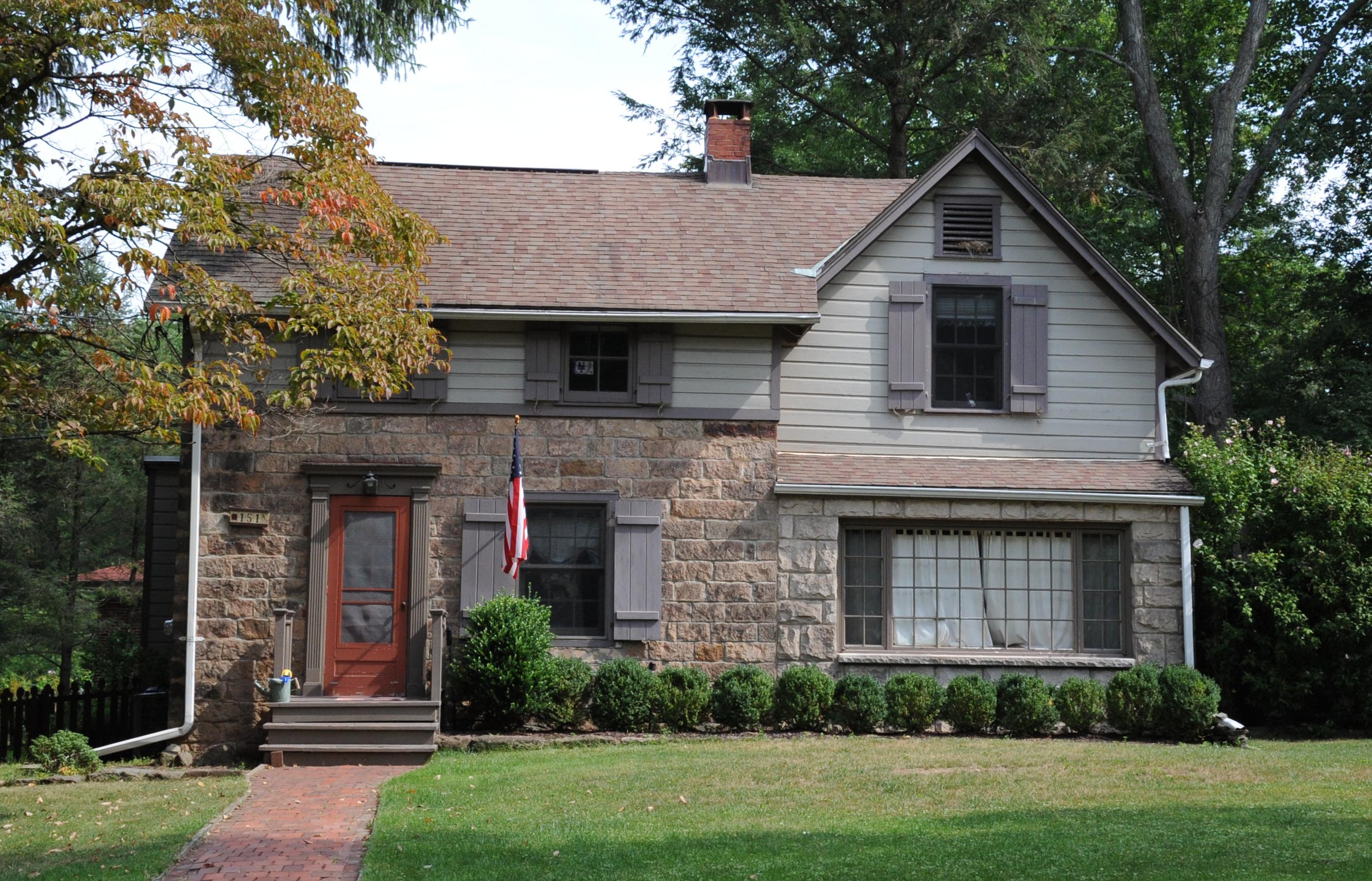

- Location within Bergen County, New Jersey Location within New Jersey Location within the United States
- Location: 151 West Street, Closter, New Jersey
- Coordinates: 40°58′43″N 73°57′50″W
- MPS: Stone Houses of Bergen County TR
- NRHP reference No.: 83001580
- NJRHP No.: 447

Significant dates
- Added to NRHP: January 9, 1983
- Designated NJRHP: October 3, 1980

The Vervalen House is a historic stone house located at 151 West Street in the borough of Closter in Bergen County, New Jersey, United States. The house was added to the National Register of Historic Places on January 9, 1983, for its significance in architecture. It was listed as part of the Early Stone Houses of Bergen County Multiple Property Submission (MPS).

The house is located near the site of a house built by Bernardus VerValen around 1713. The actual date of this house is unknown. The first recorded information is a sale of the house from Abraham A. Cole to Henry Volk in 1804. It was owned by David Van Valen after 1876.

== See also ==
- National Register of Historic Places listings in Closter, New Jersey
- National Register of Historic Places listings in Bergen County, New Jersey
