= Alfred and Olive Thorpe Lustron House =

Historic house in Florida, United States

- U.S. National Register of Historic Places
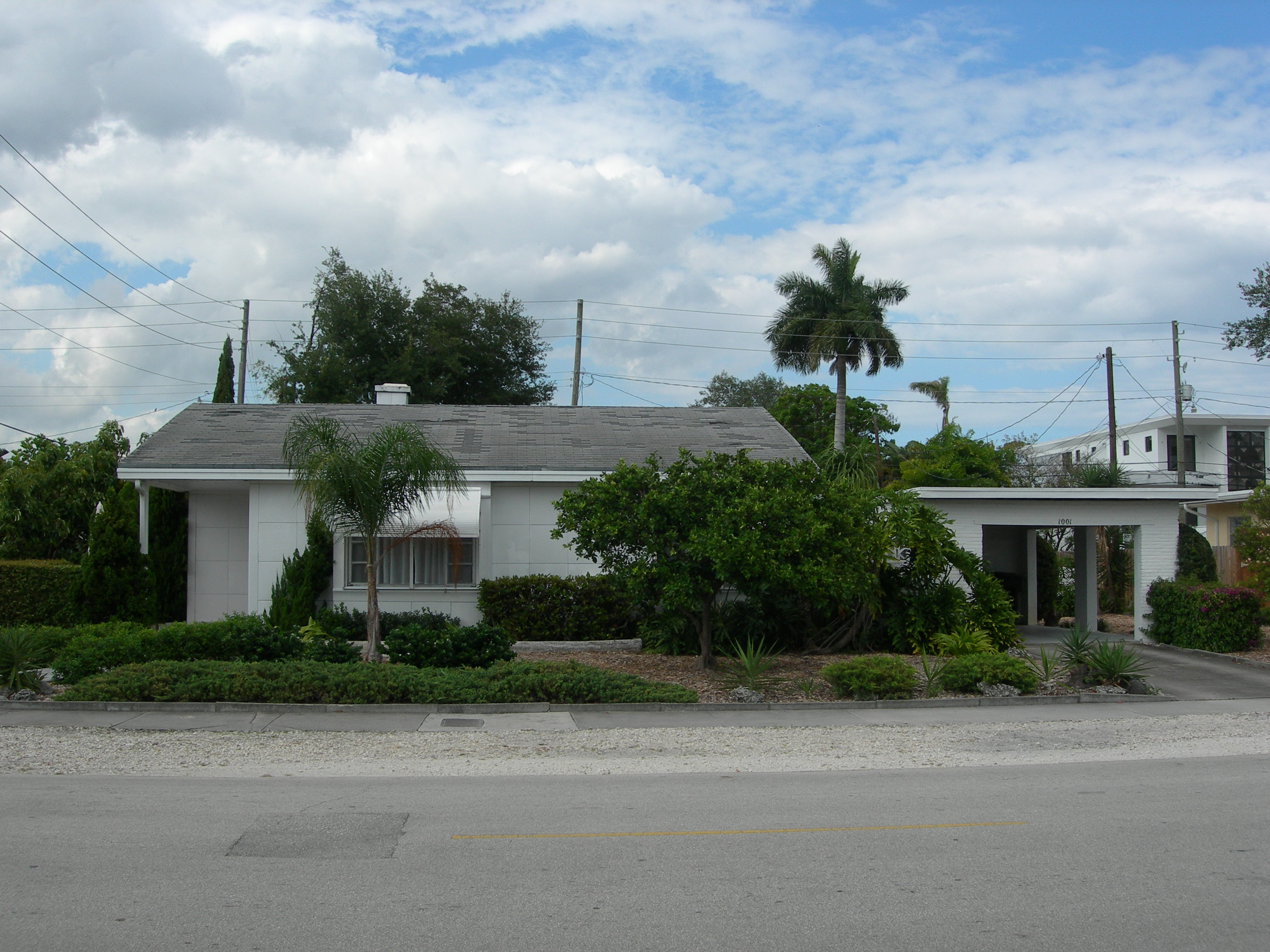

- Location within Florida Location within the United States
- Location: 1001 NE. 2nd Street, Fort Lauderdale, Florida
- Coordinates: 26°7′28″N 80°8′0″W
- Area: less than one acre
- Built: 1950
- Built by: Blass, Roy & Morris Beckman; Craftsman Home Corp.
- Architectural style: Modern Movement, Lustron Prefabricated House
- NRHP reference No.: 07001114
- Added to NRHP: 1 November 2007

The Alfred and Olive Thorpe Lustron House is a historic Lustron house built in 1950, located at 1001 Northeast 2nd Street in Fort Lauderdale, Florida.

== Description and history ==
Its original occupants were Alfred and Olive Thorpe, who purchased it apparently from a Lustron Corporation distributor, the Craftsman Home Corporation, in 1951. On November 1, 2007, it was added to the National Register of Historic Places.

It is a two-bedroom "Westchester Deluxe Model 2" example.
