= John Nagle House =

Historic house in New Jersey, United States

- U.S. National Register of Historic Places
- New Jersey Register of Historic Places
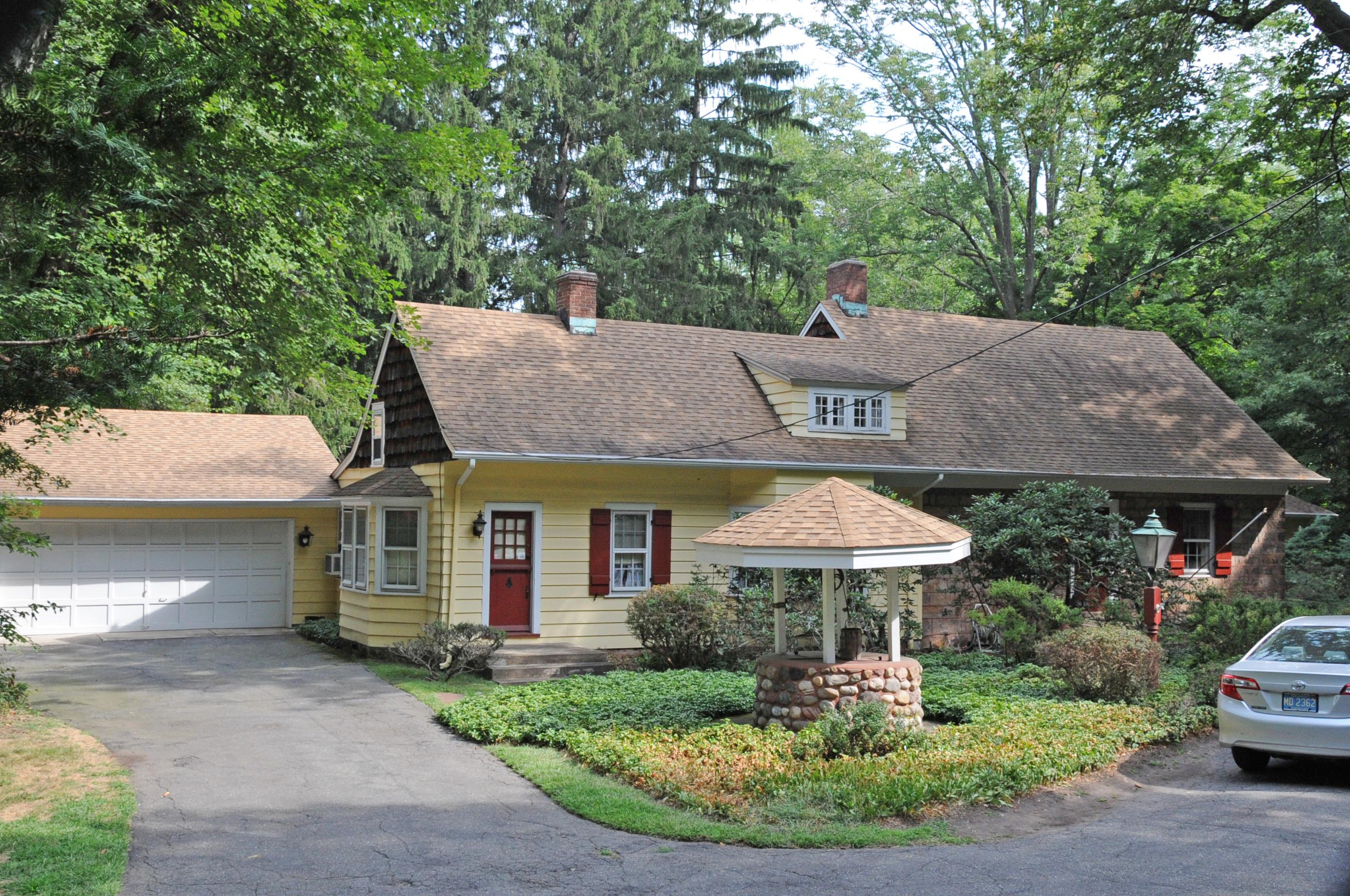

- Location within Bergen County, New Jersey Location within New Jersey Location within the United States
- Location: 75 Harvard Street, Closter, New Jersey
- Coordinates: 40°58′46″N 73°56′27″W
- Built: c. 1740
- MPS: Stone Houses of Bergen County TR
- NRHP reference No.: 83001534
- NJRHP No.: 444

Significant dates
- Added to NRHP: January 9, 1983
- Designated NJRHP: October 3, 1980

The John Nagle House, is a historic stone house located at 75 Harvard Street in the borough of Closter in Bergen County, New Jersey, United States. The house was built around 1740 and was added to the National Register of Historic Places, for its significance in the town . It was listed as part of the Early Stone Houses of Bergen County Multiple Property Submission (MPS). The nomination form lists it as a "rare surviving example of a stone saltbox form".

== See also ==
- National Register of Historic Places listings in Closter, New Jersey
- National Register of Historic Places listings in Bergen County, New Jersey
