= Farm House =

Farm House or The Farm House may refer to:

in the United States (by state)

- Farm House (Urbana, Illinois), listed on the National Register of Historic Places in Champaign County, Illinois
- The Farm House (Knapp-Wilson House), a U.S. National Historic Landmark on Iowa State University's campus
- The Farm House (Bar Harbor, Maine), a summer estate
- Farm House (Bastrop, Texas), listed on the National Register of Historic Places in Bastrop County, Texas

== See also ==
- Farm House (film), a 2008 horror film
- Farmhouse (disambiguation)
- Farmer House (disambiguation)
