= William De Clark House =

Historic house in New Jersey, United States

- U.S. National Register of Historic Places
- New Jersey Register of Historic Places
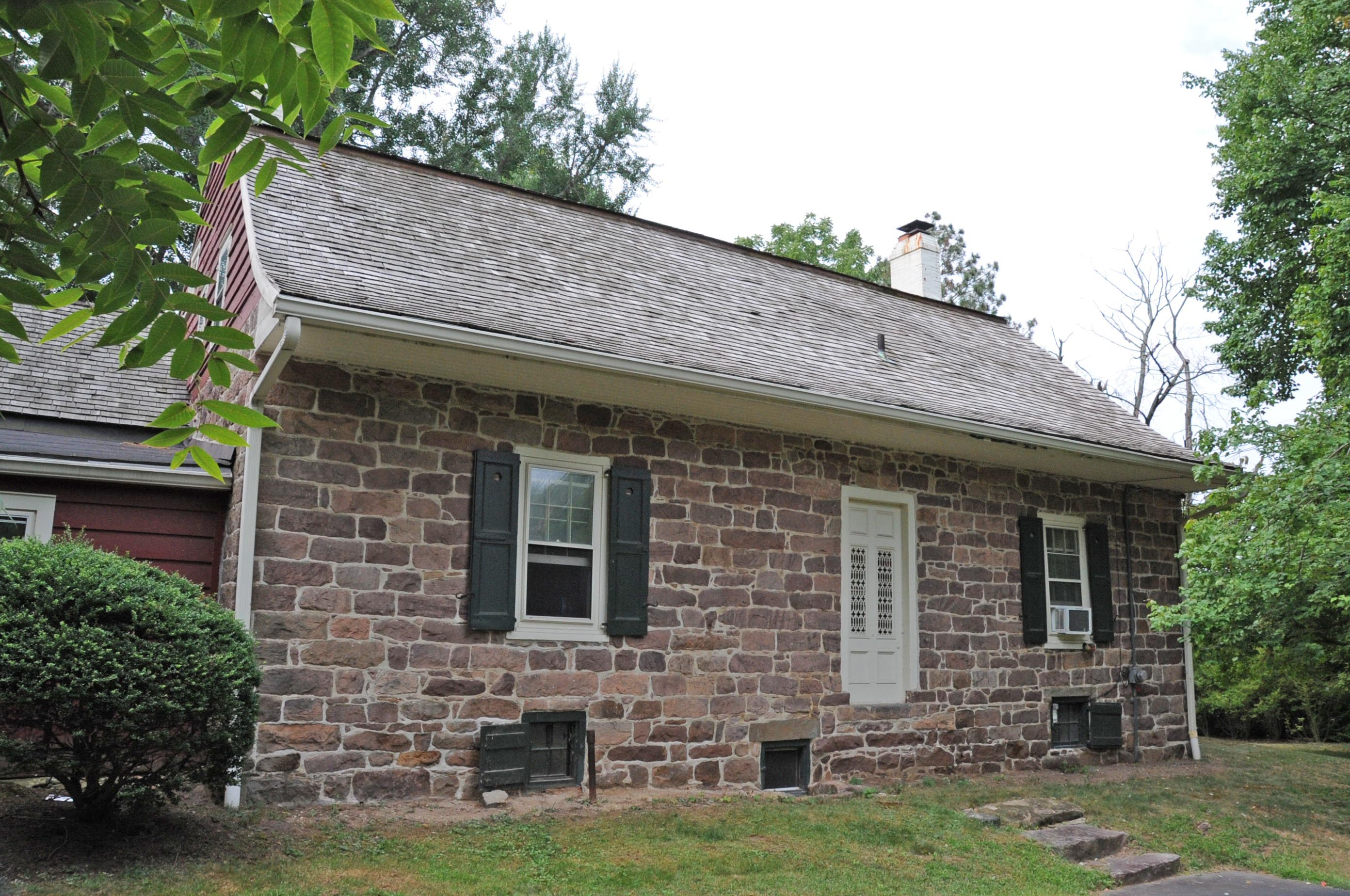
- William De Clark House

- Location within Bergen County, New Jersey Location within New Jersey Location within the United States
- Location: 145 Piermont Road, Closter, New Jersey
- Coordinates: 40°58′41″N 73°56′40″W
- Built: c. 1810
- MPS: Stone Houses of Bergen County TR
- NRHP reference No.: 83001488
- NJRHP No.: 438

Significant dates
- Added to NRHP: January 9, 1983
- Designated NJRHP: October 3, 1980

The William De Clark House, also known as Breisacher Farms, is a historic farmhouse located at 145 Piermont Road in the borough of Closter in Bergen County, New Jersey, United States. It was built around 1810 and was documented as the De Clerque Farm Group by the Historic American Buildings Survey (HABS) in 1937. The house was added to the National Register of Historic Places on January 9, 1983, for its significance in architecture. It was listed as part of the Early Stone Houses of Bergen County Multiple Property Submission (MPS).

The one and one-half story stone house was built around 1810 by William De Clark, also spelled De Clerque. The farm was bought by Elisha Ruckman in 1867. It was later owned by Mrs. Marie Breisacher.

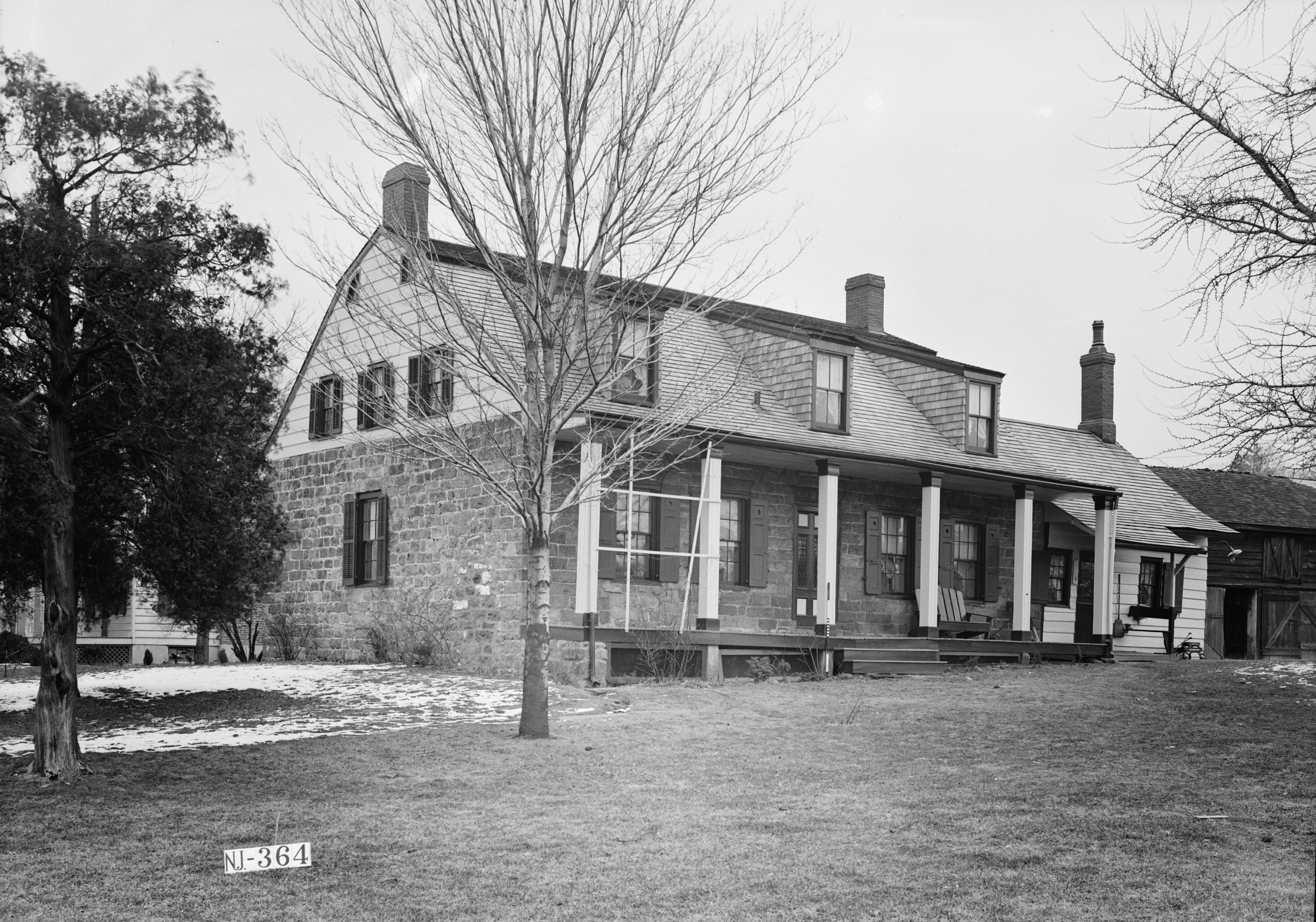
HABS photo from 1937

== See also ==
- National Register of Historic Places listings in Closter, New Jersey
- National Register of Historic Places listings in Bergen County, New Jersey
