= Tallman–Vanderbeck House =

Historic house in New Jersey, United States

- U.S. National Register of Historic Places
- New Jersey Register of Historic Places
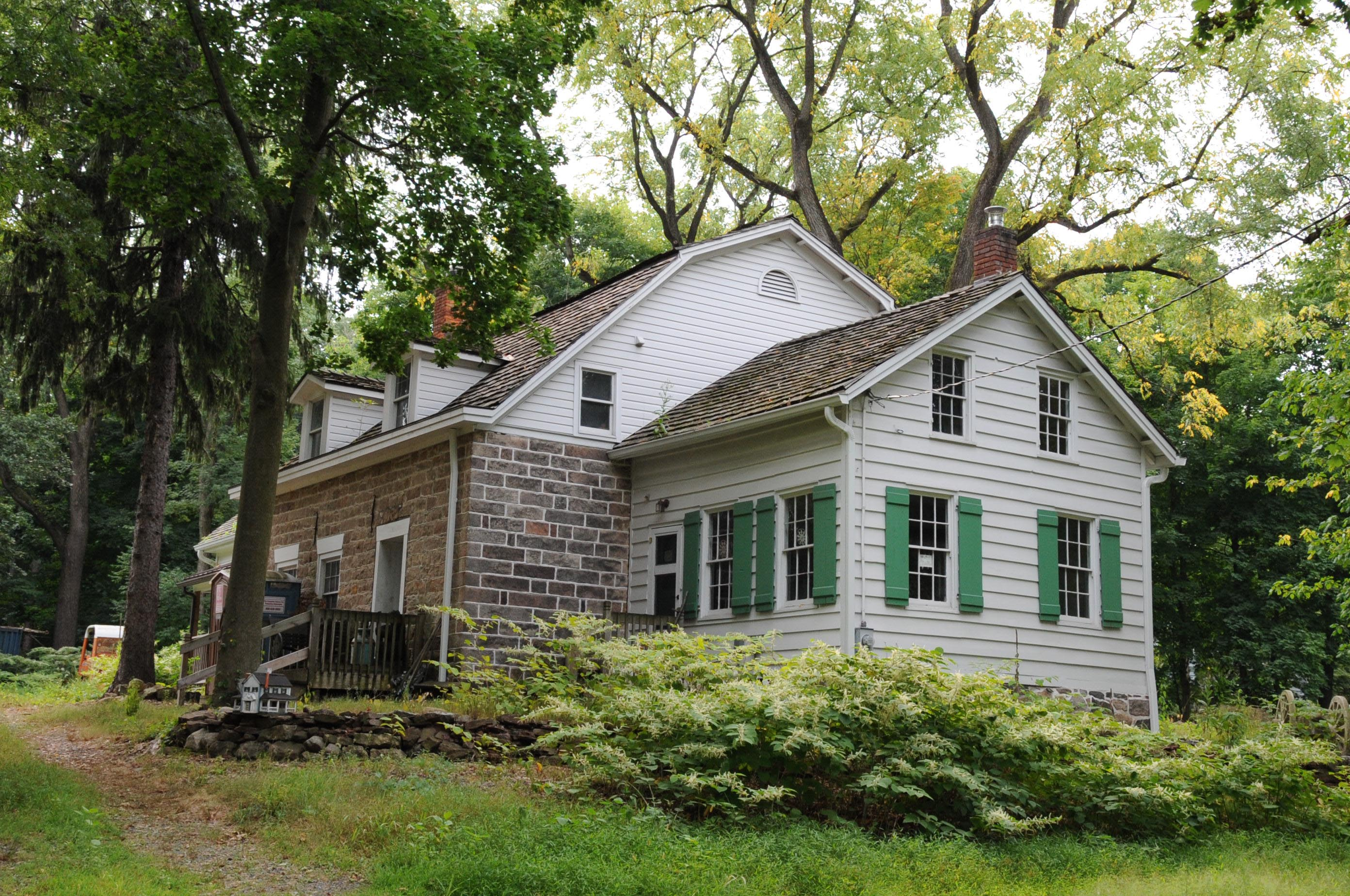

- Location within Bergen County, New Jersey Location within New Jersey Location within the United States
- Location: 639 Piermont Road, Closter, New Jersey
- Coordinates: 40°57′59″N 73°57′15″W
- Area: 6.5 acres (2.6 ha)
- Built: before 1778
- Architect: Cornelius Tallman
- MPS: Stone Houses of Bergen County TR
- NRHP reference No.: 83001551
- NJRHP No.: 445

Significant dates
- Added to NRHP: January 9, 1983
- Designated NJRHP: October 3, 1980

The Tallman–Vanderbeck House is a historic stone house located at 639 Piermont Road in the borough of Closter in Bergen County, New Jersey, United States. It was built sometime before 1778, likely by Cornelius Tallman. In the mid 19th century, Mrs. Vanderbeck operated it as an inn or stage coach stop, known as the Lone Star. The house was added to the National Register of Historic Places on January 9, 1983, for its significance in architecture. It was listed as part of the Early Stone Houses of Bergen County Multiple Property Submission (MPS).

== See also ==
- National Register of Historic Places listings in Closter, New Jersey
- National Register of Historic Places listings in Bergen County, New Jersey
