= Carl Strandlund =

Swedish-born American inventor and entrepreneur (1899–1974)

Carl G. Strandlund
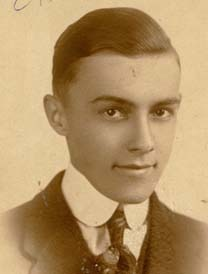
- Strandlund circa 1920
- Born: Carl Gunnar Strandlund; March 5, 1899; Sundsvall, Västernorrland County, Sweden
- Died: December 26, 1974 (aged 75); Edina, Minnesota, U.S.
- Spouse: Clara Strandlund

Carl Gunnar Strandlund (5 March 1899 – 26 December 1974) was a Swedish-born American inventor and entrepreneur.

== Background ==
Carl Gunnar Strandlund was born in Sundsvall in Västernorrland County, Sweden. Strandlund came to the United States at the age of four and grew up in Moline, Illinois. As a young man, he took correspondence school classes in engineering. His grandfather had been an engineer in Sweden. His father worked in the United States for John Deere.

== Career ==
Strandlund held over 150 farm implement patents through his work as a production engineer at the Minneapolis-Moline tractor company, including the creation of rubber tires for tractors. He later served as president of the Oliver Farm Equipment Company.

He was hired by the Chicago Vitreous Enamel Product Company to transform the factory for defense production. Strandlund invented manufacturing techniques to build non-warping metal plates for tanks during World War II, created air conditioning systems for movie theaters, and invented a wallpaper-removing machine. The company rewarded him with a promotion to vice president and general manager in September 1943.

Strandlund was most noted for inventing and promoting the Lustron house (built of porcelain-enameled steel panels, U.S. patent 2,416,240) to help address the housing shortage after World War II. A total of 2,498 homes were built between 1948 and 1950 at a large assembly plant in Columbus, Ohio, through financing from the Reconstruction Finance Corporation. The Lustron plant assembly line was some nine miles long, and the plant consumed more power than the rest of the entire city of Columbus. Mismanagement, politics, and corruption were blamed for the downfall of Lustron, which shut down amid foreclosure and bankruptcy in 1953. As of 2004, the majority of the 2,498 Lustron homes built were still standing. Fifty Lustrons have been placed on the National Register of Historic Places.

In a September 12, 1982, Minneapolis Tribune article, Strandlund's widow Clara related how Strandlund reacted to the closure of Lustron: "He was physically and mentally destroyed," she said. "Everything we had went. They took everything but our home." He died on December 26, 1974, in Minneapolis, at the age of 75. He was interred in Lakewood Cemetery.
