= Neville and Helen Farmer Lustron House =

- U.S. National Register of Historic Places
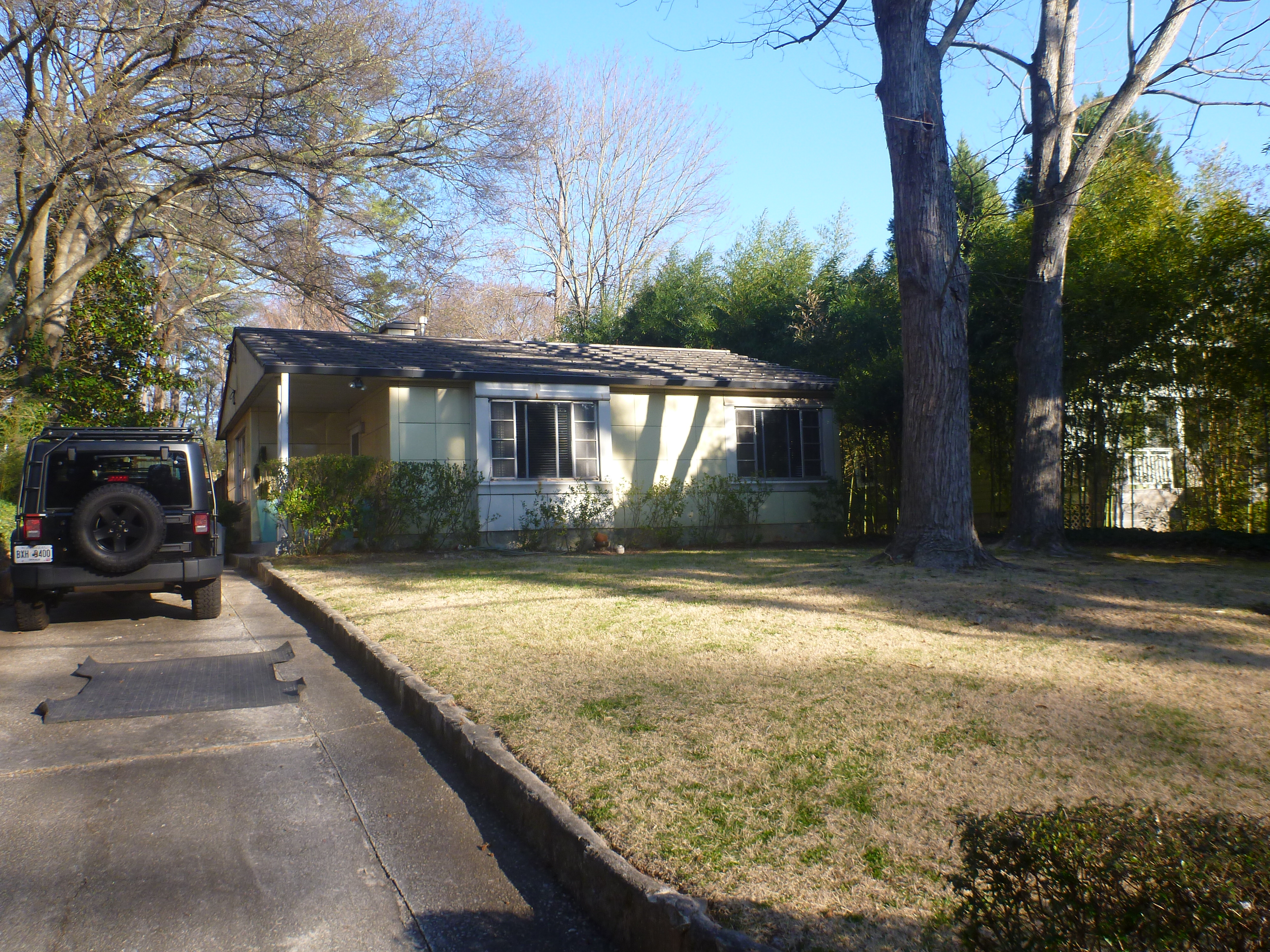
- Farmer Lustron House in March, 2013

- Location within Atlanta Location within Georgia Location within the United States
- Location: 513 Drexel Ave., Decatur, Georgia
- Coordinates: 33.771389°N 84.308611°W
- Built: 1949
- Architect: Lustron Corporation
- Architectural style: Lustron
- NRHP reference No.: 96000211
- Added to NRHP: March 19, 1996

The Neville and Helen Farmer Lustron House is a historic enameled steel prefabricated Lustron house in Decatur, Georgia. Designed and constructed by the Lustron Corporation, this example is one of two confirmed to have been built in Decatur.

The original owners who purchased the house from a Lustron Corporation franchise were Neville and Helen Farmer. It is one of ten built in the Atlanta area.

Lustron houses were only produced during a two-year period, with 2,495 known to have been made. Only roughly 2,000 of these are still in existence. Many of those that do remain have been altered significantly.
