= Morris Beckman (architect) =

American architect

Morris Beckman was an American architect. Numerous buildings that eventually were listed on the National Register of Historic Places are credited to him.

These include, for example, the Peter Hansen House (Pierre, South Dakota), which is listed on the National Register of Historic Places in Hughes County, South Dakota.

Along with architect Roy Blass, Beckman is credited with design of the "Esquire" prototype of Lustron house, which was manufactured by Chicago Vitreous firm in Cicero, Illinois and installed at Hinsdale, Illinois in 1946.

He is credited as having been the primary designer of that model.

Other works are covered in a MPS study.
