= Lustron house =

House type

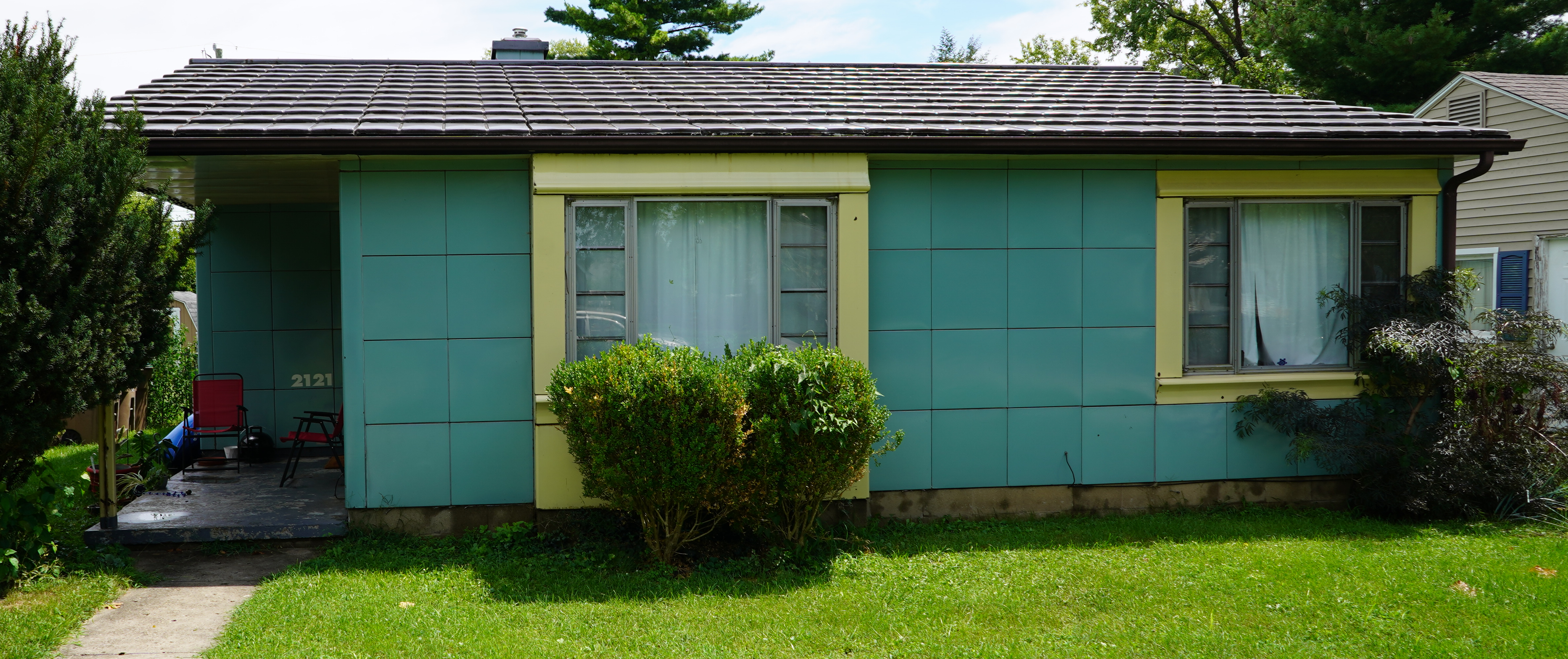
- Evans Lustron House in Columbus, Indiana
- Type: Prefabricated enameled steel houses
- Inventor: Carl Strandlund
- Inception: 1947
- Manufacturer: Lustron Corporation, Columbus, Ohio, U.S.
- Last production year: 1950

Lustron houses are prefabricated enameled steel houses developed in the post-World War II era United States in response to the shortage of homes for returning G.I.s by Lustron Corporation and Chicago industrialist and inventor Carl Strandlund. Considered low-maintenance and extremely durable, they were expected to attract modern families who might not have the time for, or interest in, repairing and painting conventional wood and plaster houses. Lustron production ceased in 1950 due to the company's inability to pay back the startup loans it had received from the Reconstruction Finance Corporation. Over 2,000 homes were constructed during the Lustron's brief production period, and many remain in use today. Several have been added to the National Register of Historic Places.

== Development ==
In January 1947, the newly formed Lustron Corporation announced that it had received a $12.5-million Reconstruction Finance Corporation loan to manufacture mass-produced prefabricated homes that featured vitreous enamel-coated steel panels (U.S. patent 2,416,240). Led by Chicago industrialist and inventor Carl Strandlund, who had worked with constructing prefabricated gas stations, Lustron offered a home that would "defy weather, wear, and time."

Strandlund's Lustron Corporation, a division of the Chicago Vitreous Enamel Corporation, set out to construct 15,000 homes in 1947 and 30,000 in 1948. From its plant in Columbus, Ohio (the former Curtiss-Wright factory), the corporation eventually constructed 2,498 Lustron homes between 1948 and 1950. The houses sold for between $8,500 and $9,500, according to a March 1949 article in the Columbus Dispatch—about 25 percent less than comparable conventional housing. By November 1949, however, a Lustron's average selling price had come up to $10,500.

Most of the known Lustron houses were constructed in 36 of the United States, including Alaska. However, some were constructed in Venezuela for families of oil industry employees.

Billed as a way to maximize pleasure and minimize work, Lustron advertising contended that the Lustron home would create a "new and richer experience for the entire family," where "Mother...has far more hours," the "youngsters...have fewer worries," and there would be "far more leisure for Dad." How this would be accomplished with just a choice of housing was not clarified, although presumably, it was through enameled-steel design that would not need painting.

The Lustron design was created to adapt it to mass production. A steel framing system was devised consisting of vertical steel studs and roof-ceiling trusses to which all interior and exterior panels were attached. The concept of prefabricated housing was well established by firms such as The Aladdin Company, Gordon-Van Tine Company, Montgomery Ward, and Sears in the early 1900s. These companies, however, used conventional balloon-framing techniques and materials in their kits. After World War II, the domestic demand for steel exceeded production and the federal government exercised control over its allocation. Strandlund had orders for his porcelain-enameled panels for use in construction for new gas stations for Standard Oil. He made a request for allocation of steel but was denied. However, he was advised by Wilson W. Wyatt, Housing Expediter during the Truman administration, that steel would be available if Strandlund produced steel houses instead of gas stations.

Wyatt endorsed the idea but was unable to convince Congressional members to appropriate funds for Strandlund. In turn, Wyatt resigned his post, but other influential members of Congress were successful in getting support to finance the production of Lustron homes. Through the government agency, Reconstruction Finance Corporation (RFC), Strandlund ultimately received over $37 million in loans plus a leased war surplus plant in Columbus, Ohio. This was the first venture capital loan made by the federal government. Initially, Strandlund was provided the availability of a war surplus plant in Chicago. However, due to political intrigue, automobile entrepreneur Preston Tucker acquired the plant. In turn, Tucker shortly failed in his business operation.

The Lustron factory had approximately eight miles of automated conveyor lines and included 11 enameling furnaces, each of which was more than 180 feet long. The plant equipment included presses for tubs and sinks. The bathtub press could stamp a tub in one draw and could produce 1000 tubs a day at capacity. Specially designed trailer trucks were used as the final assembling point where the manufactured parts came off the assembly line. There were approximately 3,300 individual parts in a complete house loaded on a single trailer. The trucks then delivered the house package to the building site.

Lustron established builder-dealers, which in turn sold and erected the house package on a concrete foundation. In 20 months of production and sales, Lustron lost money on each house, and in turn, was not able to repay the RFC loan. RFC foreclosed on Lustron and production stopped on June 6, 1950. On the Lustron order book were contracts for more than 8,000 housing units, which were never shipped.

== Models ==
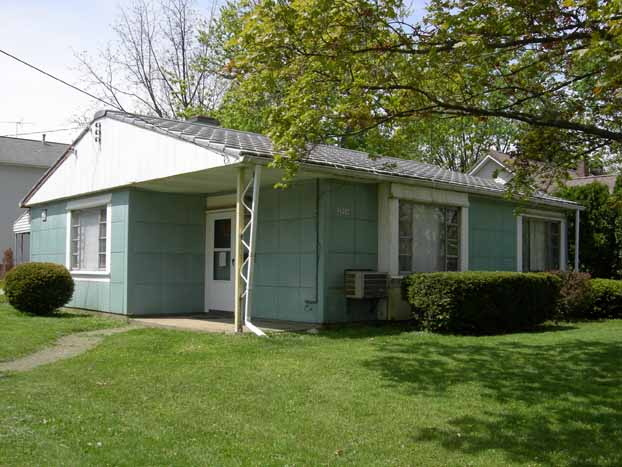
Westchester Deluxe 2-bedroom house

Arguably the most popular of the Lustron homes was the two-bedroom, 1,021-square-foot (94.9 m^{2}) "Westchester Deluxe" model. In total, there were three "models" of Lustrons: the Westchester, Newport, and Meadowbrook. With the exception of the Esquire (which had been the prototype's name) each Lustron type was available as either a two- or three-bedroom model.

=== Model comparison ===
	Westchester Standard		Westchester Deluxe		Newport		Meadowbrook	
# of Bedrooms	2	3	2	3	2	3	2	3
Square footage	1,021 square feet (94.9 m^{2})	1,140 square feet (106 m^{2})	1,021 square feet (94.9 m^{2})	1,140 square feet (106 m^{2})	713 square feet (66.2 m^{2})	1,023 square feet (95.0 m^{2})	713 square feet (66.2 m^{2})	961 square feet (89.3 m^{2})
Separate Living/Dining Rooms	Yes	Yes	Yes	Yes	No	No	No	No
Heat System	Radiant Convection	Radiant Convection	Radiant Convection	Radiant Convection	Gas Forced Air	Radiant Convection	Radiant Convection	Radiant Convection
China Pass-through Kitchen/Dining Room	No	No	Yes	Yes	No	No	No	No
Living Room Bay Window	No	No	Yes	Yes	No	No	No	No
Master Bedroom Built-in Vanity	No	No	Yes	Yes	No	No	No	No
Bathroom Built-in Vanity	No	No	Yes	Yes	No	No	No	No
Flooring Type	Builder's option	Builder's option	Asphalt tile	Asphalt tile	Builder's option	Builder's option	Builder's option	Builder's option

== Design features ==
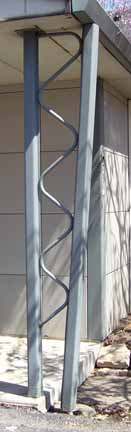
The decorative "zig-zag" accent is unique to Lustron homes.

Prefabricated housing had existed before the Lustron home came on the market. However, it was Lustron's promises of assembly-line efficiency and modular construction that set it apart from its competitors. The homes were designed by Morris Beckman of Chicago firm Beckman and Blass and may have been loosely based on designs for the Cemesto houses in Oak Ridge, Tennessee. With enameled steel panels inside and out, as well as steel framing, the homes stood out next to more traditional dwellings made of wood and plaster.

Lustron homes were usually built on concrete slab foundations with no basement. However, about 40 Lustron homes have been reported to have basements. Their sturdy steel frame was constructed on-site and the house was assembled piece-by-piece from a special Lustron Corporation delivery truck. The assembly team, who worked for the local Lustron builder-dealer, followed a special manual from Lustron and were supposed to complete a house in 360 man-hours.

=== Color options ===
The Ohio History Connection recognizes four exterior colors: "Surf Blue," "Dove Gray," "Maize Yellow," and "Desert Tan." Reported in error over the years is that Blue-Green, Green, Pink, and White were available. Window surrounds were primarily ivory-colored, although early models used yellow trim on "Surf Blue" models.

=== Interiors ===
The interiors were designed with an eye toward the modern age, space-saving, and ease of cleaning. All Lustrons had metal-paneled interior walls that were most often gray. To maximize space, all interior rooms and closets featured pocket doors. All models featured metal cabinetry, a service and storage area, and metal ceiling tiles. In the Westchester Deluxe models, the living room and master bedrooms featured built-in wall units. As an added option, customers were presented with the unique Thor-brand combination clothes- and dish-washer, which incorporated the kitchen sink.

=== Window types ===
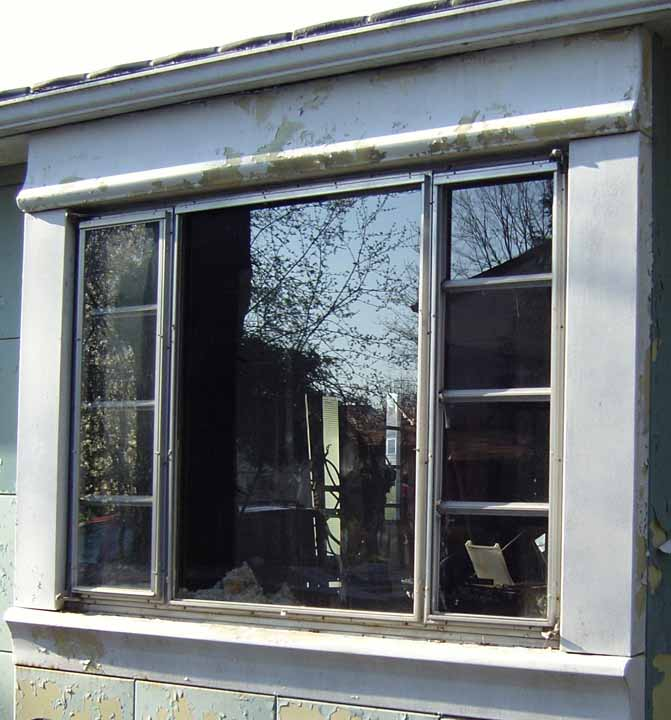
A Lustron tripartite window

There were two major window types in Lustron homes: "tripartite" and casement, all manufactured by Reynolds Aluminum. The tripartite consisted of a central light flanked by two four-light casement windows. Three-light and/or square aluminum casements with interior screens were standard on all Lustrons. Add-on storm windows were available for residents in colder climates.

Westchester Deluxe two- and three-bedroom models were unique in that they boasted a tripartite bay window in the living room area: no other Lustron line included this feature. In Westchester Deluxe two-bedroom models, additional tripartite windows were located in the dining area and bedrooms. For Westchester Deluxe three-bedroom models, tripartite windows were found in the dining area and two of the bedrooms, as well as the living room bay. Though the Westchester Standard line had no bay windows, it had tripartite windows in the same rooms as the Westchester Deluxe two-bedroom model.

Newport two- and three-bedroom models, which had no bay windows, offered tripartite windows in the dining/living room area. A model of the Meadowbrook home shows that the design would have provided two tripartite windows, both in the dining/living room area, similar to those in the Newport line.

=== Roof, flooring, and other details ===
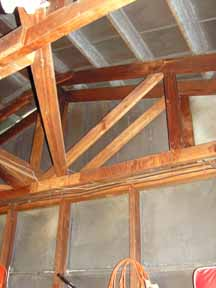
The interior supports of a Lustron G-2 garage

The roof likewise consisted of porcelain-enameled steel tiles, which were installed shingle-style. The front and rear doors featured a single light of translucent, rippled glass. As seen in the chart above, floors in the Westchester Deluxe models were asphalt tile, but in other models (Westchester Standard, Newport, and Meadowbrook), floors were installed as a "builder's option."

=== Temperature control ===
In most models, the homes were heated with an oil burning furnace that directed hot air into an enclosed space above the metal ceilings. The walls contained a one-inch blanket of fiberglass wool insulation. Complaints of the Lustron furnace design was common as it was built into the ceiling so that the heat would radiate down into rooms, however, the warm air would remain near the ceiling leaving the floors extremely cold. Later production models of the Newport use a forced-air system.

=== Identifying marks ===
Among noteworthy Lustron exterior features are the siding consisting of square segments of material, followed by a zig-zag downspout trellis on the buildings' front and rear corners. In the two-bedroom Westchester models, the downspout attaches via the trellis to a pillar that supports the open porch. Rust has often led to removal of the trellis by owners.

== End of the Lustron Corporation ==
The Lustron Corporation declared bankruptcy in 1950, despite it being an extremely well-funded, well-publicized, government-supported enterprise manufacturing a desperately needed product. Production delays, the lack of a viable distribution strategy, and the escalating prices for the finished product all contributed to the failure. Additionally, local zoning codes also played a part. In some municipalities, for example, an ordinance prohibited homes with steel chimneys. Some accounts suggest an organized effort from the existing housing industry to stop Strandlund, comparing him to Preston Tucker. (Strandlund's first choice for the Lustron factory building, the Dodge Chicago Plant, was actually granted to Tucker to build his automobiles).

== Lustrons on a Marine base ==
The largest assembly of Lustrons in one geographic location was in Quantico, Virginia, where 60 were installed at Marine Corps Base Quantico. All Westchester Deluxe models, they came in all four colors. Major remodels in the 1980s resulted in some of them being painted pink and lime green. In January 2006, it was announced that the homes, which had grown "too small for most families," would be eliminated from base housing and would be given away. Fifty-eight of Quantico's Lustrons were offered for free (with an application and $8,000 deposit) in 2006, yet only one individual came forward and acquired a home, which was disassembled and moved to storage in Delaware. Twenty-three of Quantico's Lustrons were demolished in 2006, and an additional thirty-four homes were razed in 2007. The two remaining homes at the base are on the National Register of Historic Places, and are currently used as maintenance buildings.

== Preservation ==
About 1,500 Lustron homes are still in existence in 36 states. Many have been modified with additions, remodeled kitchens, vinyl windows, composite roofs, new heating systems, sheet rock interior walls, painted exteriors, and siding. Some have been dismantled, relocated and reassembled.

A restored Westchester Deluxe (sans ceiling and roof) from Arlington, Virginia, was reassembled inside the Ohio History Connection in Columbus, Ohio, in 2013. It had been partially assembled (no bedrooms) for a few months in the Museum of Modern Art. The house continues to be on display in Columbus through 2024 at least.

A small group of Lustron owners are preserving the original condition of their homes and are urging others to do the same, and a significant number of entirely original Lustron homes exist. Over time, Lustron owners often removed the Thor brand combination washing machine/dishwasher, and in cold regions, the ceiling's radiant heat systems were often replaced.

A Lustron house in Bluffview, Dallas, was given historic landmark status in April 2026.

=== Threats ===
Demolition continues to threaten Lustrons where rising property values attract buyers who desire larger homes of newer construction. Other major threats to Lustron homes' integrity include: severe weather, vehicular or other impact, and lack of local zoning/preservation/aesthetic legislation.

== Current status ==
Many Lustron houses remain, some as individual or contributing properties to the National Register of Historic Places. The Lustron Houses of Jermain Street Historic District is a notable grouping and historic district in Albany, New York.

== See also ==
- List of Lustron houses
- Alcoa Care-free Homes
- Dymaxion house
- Hobart Welded Steel House Company, which manufactured steel houses
- White Castle (restaurant), whose Porcelain Steel Buildings subsidiary manufactured similar commercial buildings
- Manufactured housing
- Prefabricated home
- Leisurama
