= Jackson Historic District =

Jackson Historic District may refer to:

- Jackson Historic District (Jackson, Alabama), listed on the National Register of Historic Places (NRHP) in Clarke County, Alabama
- West Jackson Boulevard District, Chicago, Illinois, also known as West Jackson Historic District, NRHP-listed
- Jackson Historic District (Jackson, Louisiana), NRHP-listed
- Grove Street-Jackson Historic District, Vicksburg, Mississippi, listed on the National Register of Historic Places listings in Warren County, Mississippi
- Jackson Historic District (Jackson, North Carolina), NRHP-listed
- Mount Jackson Historic District, Mount Jackson, Virginia, listed on the NRHP in Shenandoah County, Virginia
