= Bauserman =

Bauserman may refer to:

- Joe Bauserman (born 1985), American former football quarterback
- Bauserman Farm
