= Mount Jackson, Virginia =

- Town
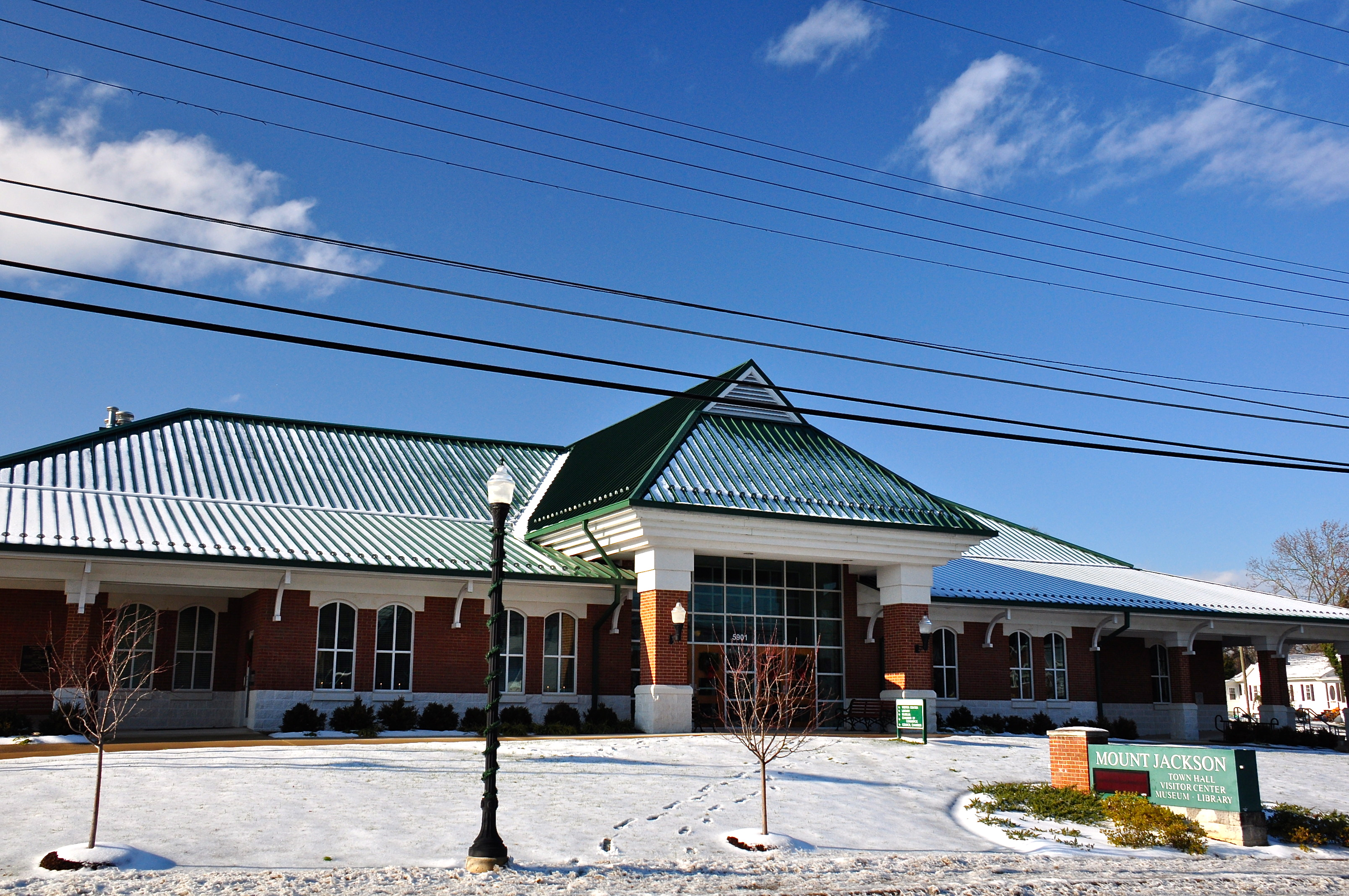
- Mount Jackson Town Hall, Visitor Center, Museum and Library in December 2013

- Flag Seal

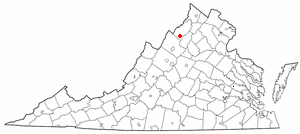
- Location of Mount Jackson, Virginia
- Coordinates: 38°45′00″N 78°38′15″W
- Country: United States
- State: Virginia
- County: Shenandoah

Area
  - Total: 3.83 sq mi (9.93 km^{2})
  - Land: 3.81 sq mi (9.87 km^{2})
  - Water: 0.027 sq mi (0.07 km^{2})
- Elevation: 909 ft (277 m)

Population (2020)
  - Total: 1,961
  - Estimate (2019): 2,118
  - Density: 555.9/sq mi (214.65/km^{2})
- Time zone: UTC-5 (Eastern (EST))
  - Summer (DST): UTC-4 (EDT)
- ZIP code: 22842
- Area code: 540
- FIPS code: 51-53992
- GNIS feature ID: 1498404
- Website: Official website

Mount Jackson is a town in Shenandoah County, Virginia, United States. As of the 2020 census, Mount Jackson had a population of 1,961.

For highway travelers passing by, Mount Jackson is easily identified from I-81 exit 273 by the water tower painted as a basket of apples, which was recently repainted. For those exploring off the highway, the town has history as a commercial and railroad hub in the region, with rich Civil War heritage and a historic district listed on the National Register of Historic Places.

== History ==
In 1739, attracted by rich valley land and abundant water supply, Benjamin Allen purchased a 400-acre tract at the confluence of Mill Creek and the North Fork of the Shenandoah River and established a grist mill by 1746. Soon other settlers and small mills followed. The village was known as Mount Pleasant. On January 28, 1826, an act of the General Assembly of Virginia changed the name of the village in honor of General Andrew Jackson, the hero of the War of 1812.

Mount Jackson became relatively wealthy because of its location, about halfway between Winchester and Staunton along the Valley Turnpike through the Shenandoah Valley, at a place where a tributary, Mill Creek, fed into the North Fork of the Shenandoah River. This provided power for milling enterprises to serve the local farms. Another major road, Howard's Lick Turnpike, was started in 1856, originating in town heading towards mountainous western Virginia. Generating further development, Mt. Jackson was the original terminus of the spur of the Manassas Gap Railroad that extended from Strasburg, Virginia. This railroad was a key conduit for the crops and produce of the region to go to market further east. The connection to Mt. Jackson was completed in 1859, but the Civil War stopped further construction, so the line remained a spur with Mt. Jackson the endpoint. It was not until 1868, after the Baltimore & Ohio bought the line and repaired it from war damage, that the rail line was completed through to Harrisonburg. Mt. Jackson became a small but significant rail entrepot for grain, apples, and livestock, continuing to prosper as a mill and railroad town during the late nineteenth and early twentieth centuries.

=== Civil War era ===
Company G of the 33rd Regiment of Virginia Infantry, part of the famous "Stonewall Brigade" under command of General Thomas "Stonewall" Jackson, was largely recruited in Mt. Jackson and vicinity.

The town saw conflict during the Civil War, incurred damage and was occupied by soldiers of both armies at various times. During his Valley Campaign of 1862, General Thomas "Stonewall" Jackson made one of his headquarters just south of town at a manor on Rude's Hill, about 3 miles south of Mt. Jackson. As a highly defensible high ground position, commanding the Valley Pike, the North Fork of the Shenandoah River and Meem's Bottom and approaches south, Rude's Hill had a particularly active role in the Civil War, occupied, encamped on and contested by both armies from 1862 to 1865.

On November 16–18, 1863 Col. William H. Boyd's Union cavalry reconnoitred from West Virginia to the area of the Valley Pike. The Federal troopers skirmished at Woodstock, Edinburg and Mt. Jackson. North of Mt. Jackson the Federals encountered Confederate cavalry under command of Maj. Robert White. White. The rebel troopers retreated through Mt. Jackson fighting, crossing the bridges through Meems Bottom and to the defensible position on Rude's Hill. Realizing that White's horse artillery could sweep the bridge from the hill, Boyd withdrew from the skirmish at Rude's Hill and withdrew to Woodstock, pursued by Confederate cavalry. Boyd's reconnaissance-in-force then returned to West Virginia. Losses from the Mount Jackson cavalry engagement were light on both sides.

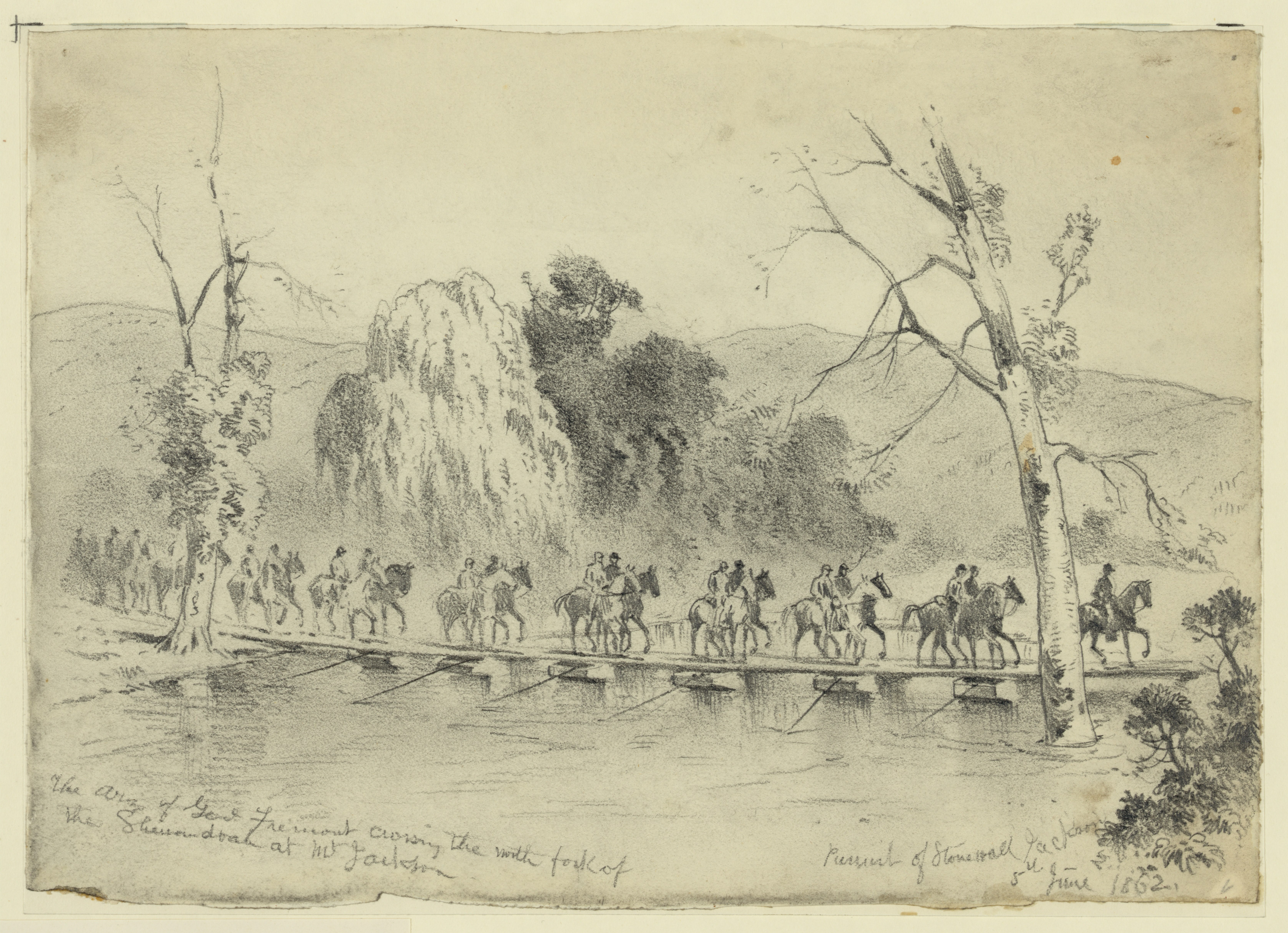
The Union Army under General Fremont crossing the north fork of the Shenandoah at Mt. Jackson during the 1862 campaign

Troop movements and engagements in and near the town were particularly active in May 1864, around the Battle of New Market, 7 miles from Mt. Jackson. On May 14 a delaying action was fought at Rude's Hill by the Confederate 18th Virginia Cavalry, under the overall command of Col. John Imboden. The Confederate cavalry slowed the Union advance, enabling Gen. John Breckinridge to gather the main body of his Confederate forces at New Market, about 4 miles away. After losing the battle on May 15, Union General Franz Sigel managed to organize a rearguard on Rude's Hill, with infantry east of the turnpike, some cavalry west of the road and the artillery behind the line. Due to the exhaustion of the men and low ammunition, Sigel decided to retreat across the Meems bottomland and the North Fork of the Shenandoah River to Mount Jackson. Breckinridge at the same time, concerned the Federals would make a stand on Rude's Hill, advanced his cavalry and artillery to the crest of Rude's Hill where they shelled and harassed Sigel's retreating Federals in Meems Bottom. The Union army managed to cross Mill Creek at Mt. Jackson and burned the bridge that spanned the creek to Mt. Jackson before the Confederates could catch up.

Rude's Hill was also the site of a Confederate stand following their demoralizing and humiliating defeat on September 22, 1864, at the Battle of Fisher's Hill, about 23 miles north of Mt. Jackson. Gen. Jubal Early rallied and deployed his remaining Confederate infantry in line across the top of the hill on November 22, 1864, to check the advance of two divisions of Union cavalry following them. The Union cavalry charged the Confederate line but were repulsed in a sharp action. Early then retreated from Rude's Hill to Harrisonburg, eventually retreating to the entrance of the Shenandoah Valley at Browns Gap in the Blue Ridge.

In a predawn raid on October 3, 1864, Confederate Captain John McNeill led approximately 50 Confederate rangers against roughly 100 Union troopers of the 8th Ohio Cavalry Regiment guarding a bridge from Meems Bottom, a strategic crossing of the Valley Turnpike over the North Fork of the Shenandoah River to Mt. Jackson. The attack lasted just fifteen minutes with most of the Union cavalry captured but McNeill, one of the best-known and feared Confederate partisan raiders as leader of McNeill's Rangers, was mortally wounded. He was taken to the house on Rude's Hill, where his identity was later discovered by Union General Philip Sheridan's troops. He was later secreted away by a band of Confederates after the Federals had temporarily left, thinking him to sick to move. McNeill was taken by the Confederates to Harrisonburg where he died on November 10.

In October 1864, as part of Union General Phil Sheridan's 1864 Valley Campaign aimed at destroying anything of potential military value, Mt. Jackson's mill was obliterated. Towards the end of the war, Rude's Hill was also the scene of a cavalry skirmish when Confederate Brigadier General Thomas Rosser's troopers attacked Union troops guarding Confederate prisoners on March 7, 1865.

Outside of troop movements or significant engagements, Civil War skirmishes were recorded as happening at Mt. Jackson on March 25, 1862; June 3, 6 and 16, 1862; November 18, 1863; September 23–24, 1864; October 3, 1864; and March 7, 1865.

As the southern terminus of a north–south railroad line connecting to Northern Virginia, Mt. Jackson was an ideal location for military hospitals and became a center for military medical treatment, ultimately used by both sides in the conflict. A Confederate hospital was built in Mt. Jackson along the Manassas Gap Railroad in 1861, to which wounded and sick were to be transported by rail from the Confederate Army of Northern Virginia. Dr. Andrew Russell Meem, a graduate of Princeton University and a native of Mt. Jackson, ran the hospital and the land was donated by Col. Levi Rinker, a large slaveowner and one of the wealthiest families in the valley. The hospital, intended as a wayside hospital for intermediate care not a permanent treatment facility for badly wounded, consisted of three two-story buildings and could accommodate 500 patients, a mixture of wounded soldiers and those sick from disease. The hospital functioned nearly continuously throughout the war, attending to wounded from the battles of Antietam, Gettysburg as well as the Shenandoah Valley campaigns. In addition, with shifting control of the town some Union soldiers were treated at the hospital and at other makeshift hospitals in the town, including Union Church. A Confederate cemetery was established across from the hospital, directly along the tracks of the railroad. At the end of the war in 1865, Union troops tore down the hospital, using the lumber to build a federal occupation installation on Rude's Hill, 3 miles south of Mt. Jackson. This post was removed in 1875 when the Reconstruction era ended. The Confederate cemetery is all that visibly remains of the hospital today in the town of Mt. Jackson.

=== Historic buildings ===
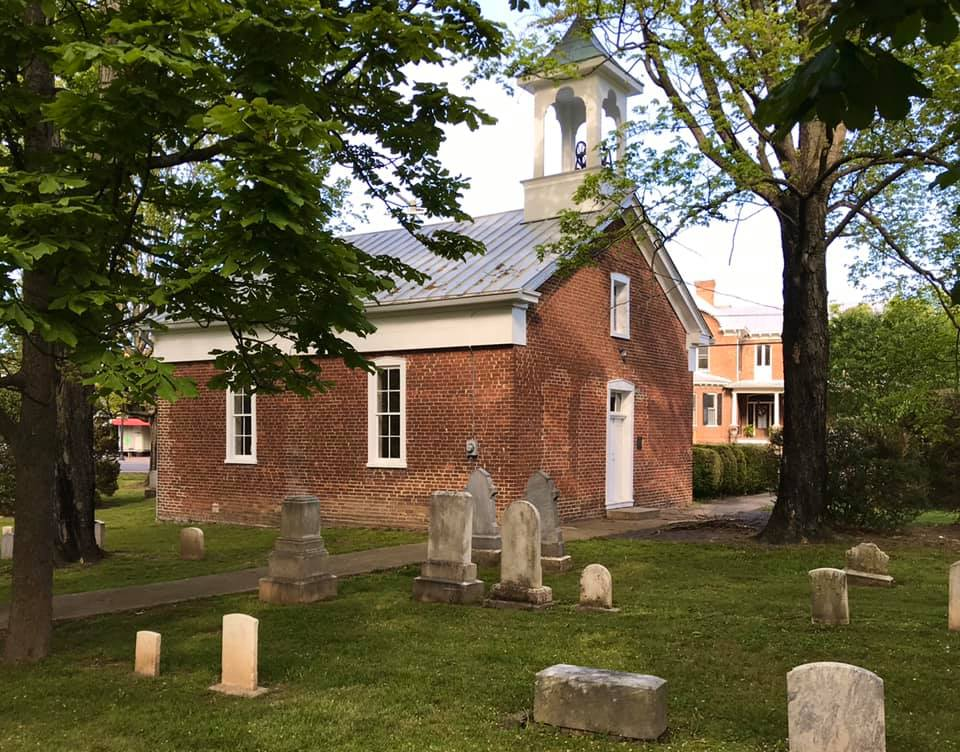
The historic Union Church and Cemetery, in the center of the town of Mt. Jackson, Virginia

One of the most notable landmarks in Mt. Jackson, Virginia is the little red brick Union Church in the center of town, built circa 1825, one of the oldest structures in the town. In 1822 an early settler bequeathed to the town a lot to build a nondenominational church for the use of any Christian congregations in the area. A frame church was originally erected on the site, but was replaced by the present brick structure around 1825. The church was used by both sides during the Civil War, including use as a hospital, with etchings on the walls by passing soldiers. Daniel Grey, a Revolutionary War soldier, lays buried here. Many of the most prominent early citizens of the area lay at rest in the church yard. Union Church is on the National Register of Historic Places.

The Mount Jackson Historic District encompasses 125 buildings and contributing structures in the town. This includes a variety of commercial, residential, and institutional buildings dating primarily from the late-19th to the early-20th century, the era of the town's greatest prosperity. They are in a variety of popular architectural styles including Gothic Revival, Federal, and Queen Anne. Other notable buildings include the Stoneburner House, Tisinger House, S. P. Lonas House, Brill Building, Lonas Store, former Peoples Bank (c. 1904), Mt. Jackson Volunteer Fire Department (1936), Mt. Jackson Theatre Building (1938), St. Andrew's Episcopal Church (1876), Mt. Jackson Methodist Episcopal Church (1884), and Triplett Middle School (1925). The historic district was listed on the National Register of Historic Places in 1993.

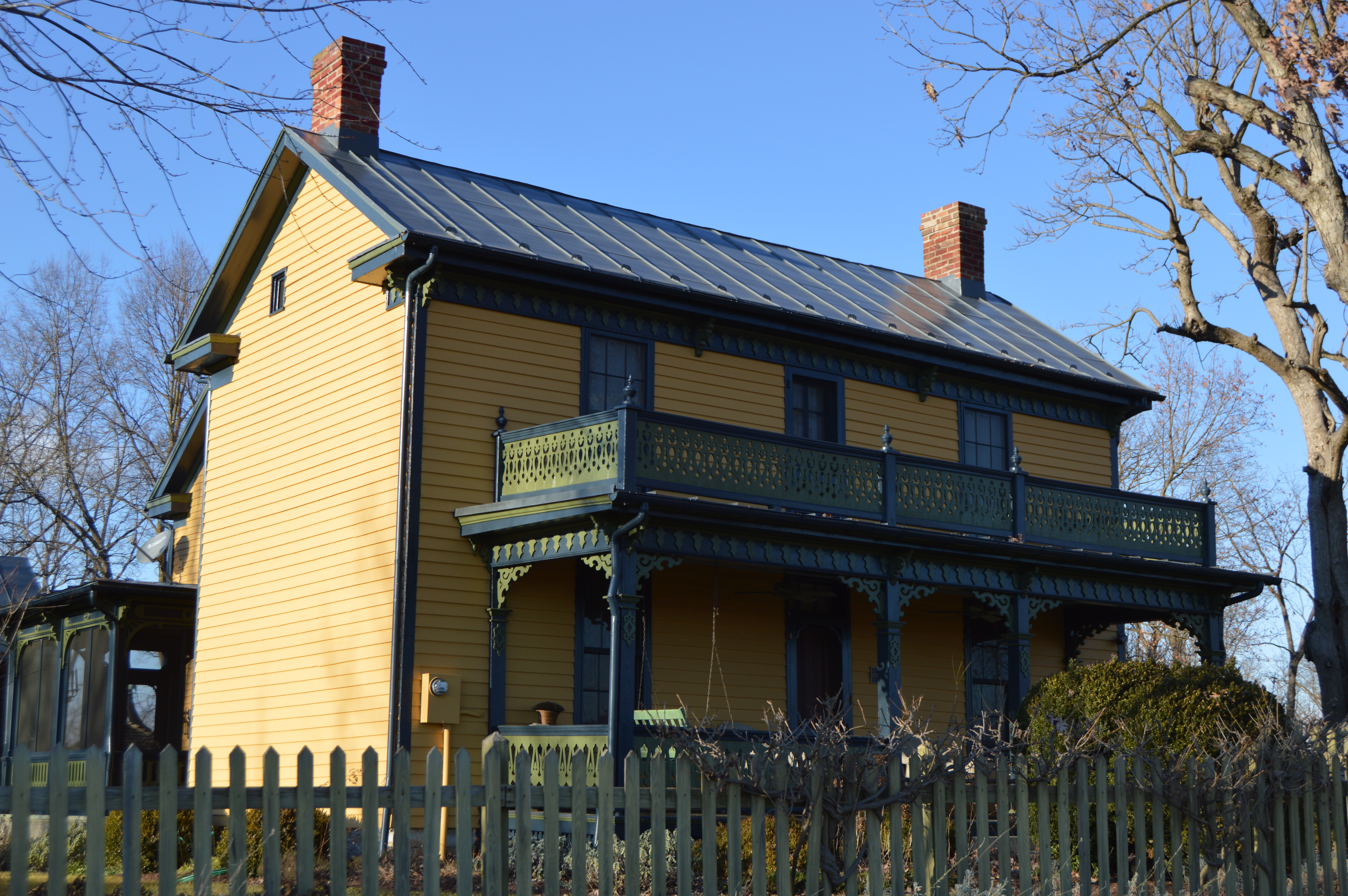
The Kagey-Bauserman Farmhouse near Mt. Jackson, built circa 1860 is a well-preserved gable-roofed, two-story, Italianate farmhouse on 76 acres of land continuously farmed since the 1800s.

The Bauserman Farm, Meems Bottom Covered Bridge and J.W.R. Moore House are listed on the National Register of Historic Places.

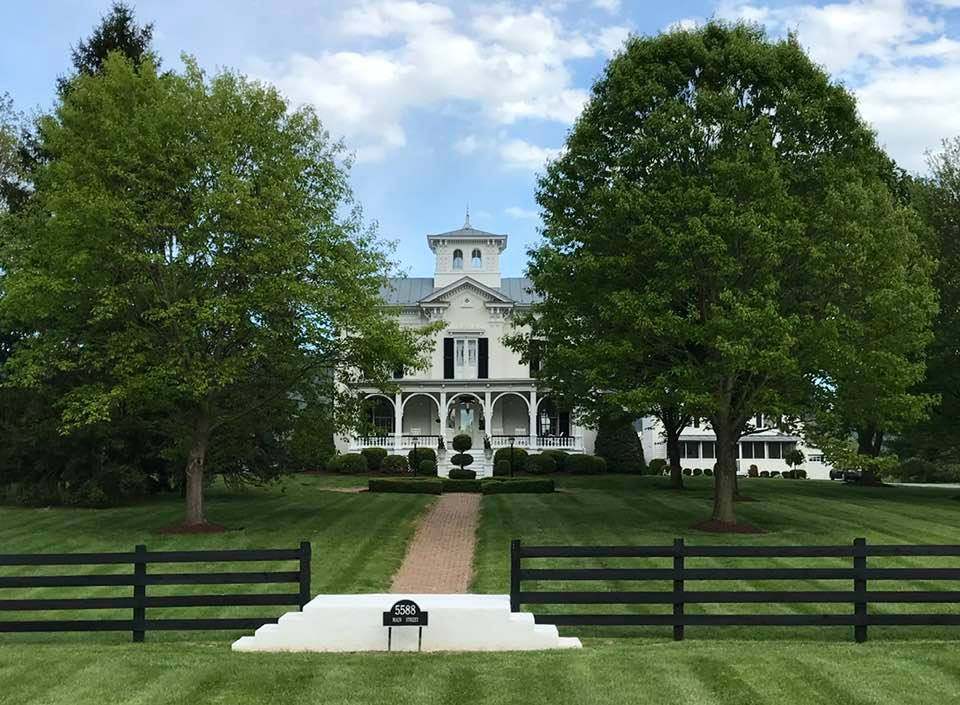
The J.W.R. Moore House in Mt. Jackson, Virginia

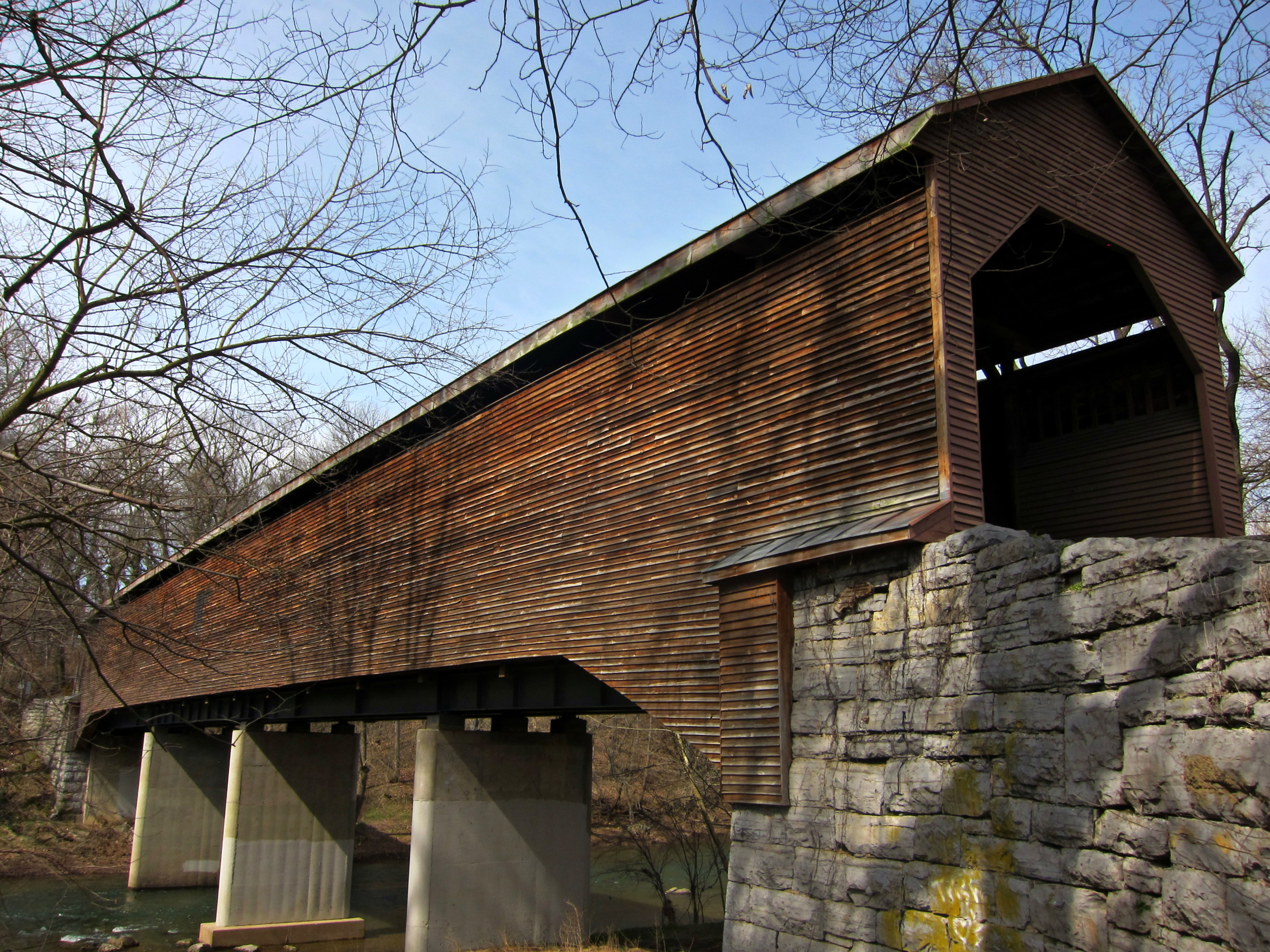
Meems Bottom Covered Bridge near Mt. Jackson

== Geography ==
Mount Jackson, in the heart of the Shenandoah Valley, is in the southern part of Shenandoah County at 38°45′00″N 78°38′15″W (38.749950, -78.637638). The town is located just to the west of Short Mountain, a prominent ridge of the Massanutten Mountain Ridge. Short Mountain is seven miles in length, from Mount Jackson on the south end to Edinburg on the north.

The most prominent feature of Short Mountain is "The Knob," a rocky top barren at the south end of the mountain, an iconic landmark overlooking Mt. Jackson, the image of which is part of the town's official seal. When the Knob was threatened with private development, The Conservation Fund and Town of Mount Jackson worked together to secure $80,000 of funding to preserve it, purchasing it in January 2020 and conveying its 91 acres to the Forest Service to be part of the George Washington National Forest.

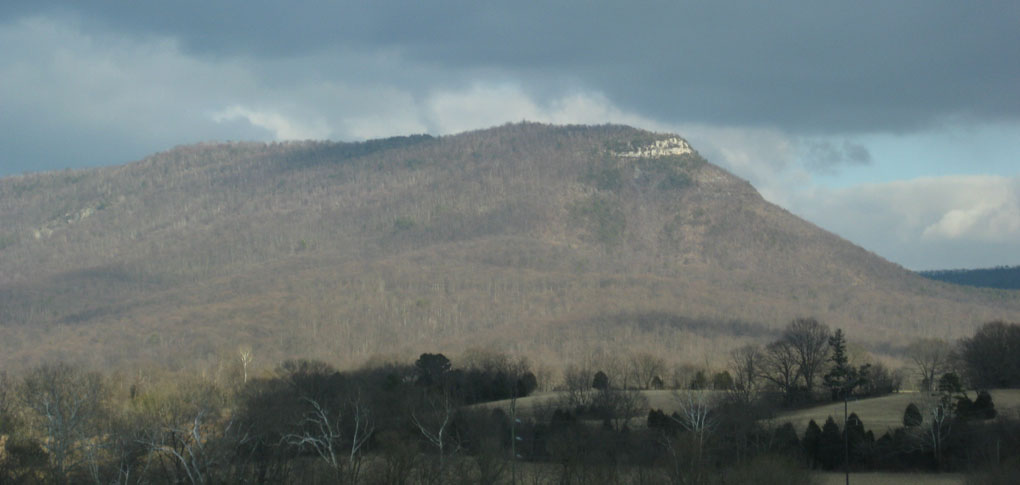
The Knob, a prominent landmark overlooking Mt. Jackson, included on its official town seal

According to the United States Census Bureau, the town has a total area of 1.2 square miles (3.2 km^{2}), all land.

== Businesses ==
Mt. Jackson hosts several businesses serving the region, including Holtzman Propane and Valley Fertilizer & Chemical Company (established 1937). Bowman Andros Products has a fruit processing factory in Mt. Jackson. A recent successful enterprise located in the town is Route 11 Potato Chips, which moved its production facility to Mount Jackson in 2008.

== Transportation ==
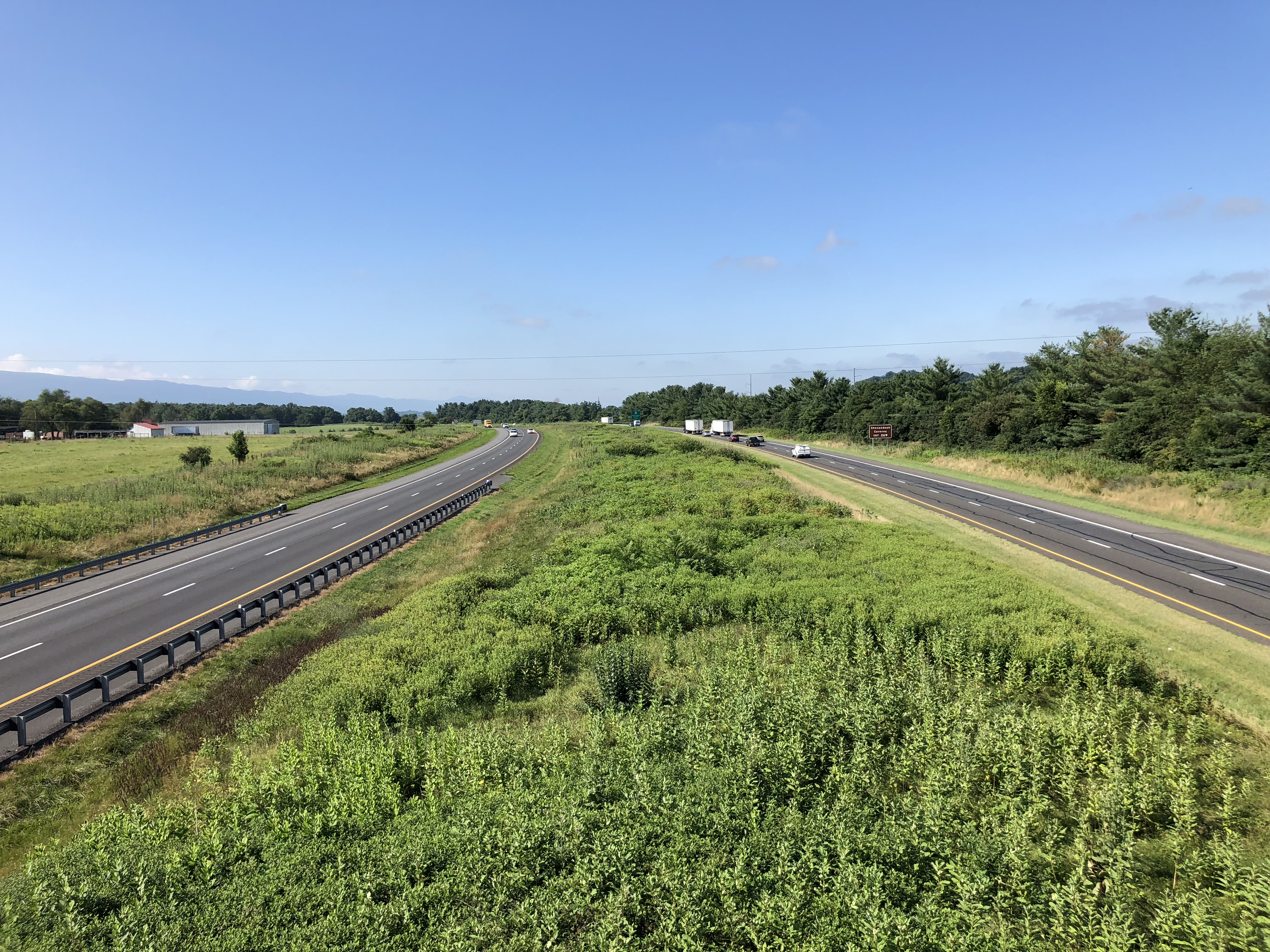
I-81 in Mount Jackson

The primary highway passing by Mount Jackson is Interstate 81, which continues south to southwestern Virginia and Tennessee, and north to West Virginia, Maryland, Pennsylvania and New York. Virginia State Route 292 connects I-81 to U.S. Route 11, the original and historic Valley Turnpike which now serves as the main local road passes through downtown Mount Jackson. Rt. 11, the historic route through the Shenandoah Valley, roughly parallels I-81 and offers access to it. Virginia State Route 263 named Orkney Springs Road extends westward from US 11 in Mount Jackson, connecting to Basye resort area and the historic Orkney Springs in the mountains of westernmost Shenandoah County.

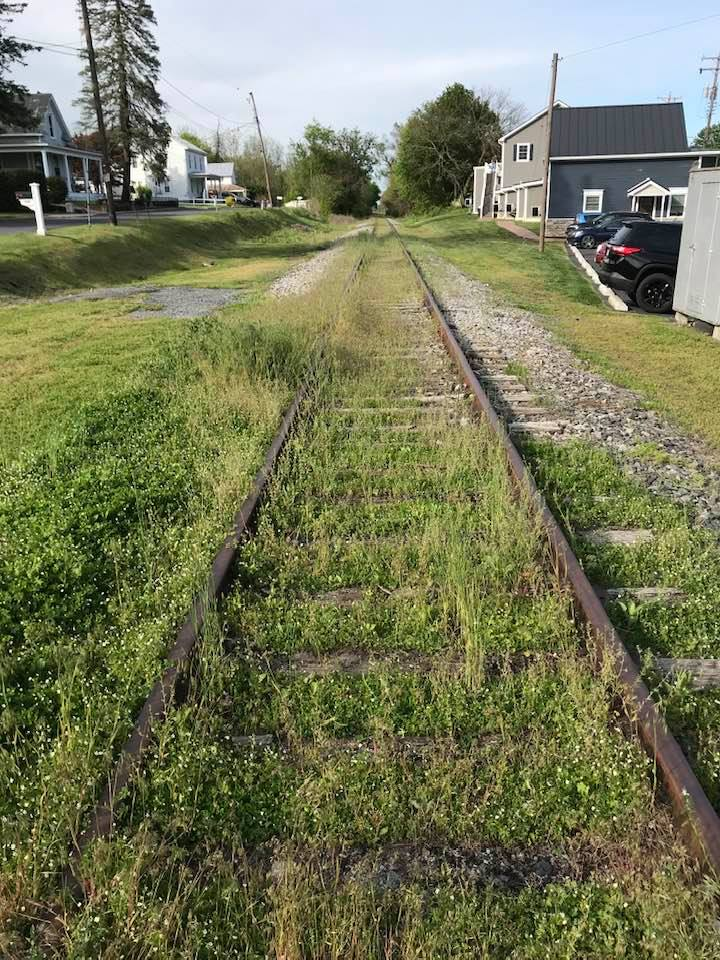
The out-of-service Norfolk Southern rail line in Mt. Jackson, Virginia was originally the terminus of the Manassas Gap Railroad

Norfolk Southern has a rail line extending through Mt. Jackson, originally part of the historic Manassas Gap Railroad, that it has put out of service, lacking industrial demand. The last train traveled south from Mt. Jackson in 2014. In 2016, Norfolk Southern announced that it would no longer be maintaining the railbed, and the rail line has become overgrown with weeds and brush. Pending formal abandonment by the Norfolk Southern, a consortium of public, private and non-profit organizations based in the counties of Shenandoah and Rockingham, Virginia have come together in an exploratory group called the Shenandoah Rail Trail Partnership to seek transformation of the 38.5-mile out-of-service rail corridor (62.0 km) from Strasburg to Broadway (including Mt. Jackson as a historic hub) into a multi-use trail.

== Demographics ==
Historical population
Census	Pop.	Note	%±
1860	560		—
1870	270		−51.8%
1880	494		83.0%
1900	472		—
1910	479		1.5%
1920	500		4.4%
1930	575		15.0%
1940	562		−2.3%
1950	732		30.2%
1960	722		−1.4%
1970	681		−5.7%
1980	1,419		108.4%
1990	1,583		11.6%
2000	1,664		5.1%
2010	1,994		19.8%
2020	1,961		−1.7%
U.S. Decennial Census

=== 2020 census ===
As of the 2020 census, Mount Jackson had a population of 1,961. The median age was 40.7 years. 23.5% of residents were under the age of 18 and 17.2% of residents were 65 years of age or older. For every 100 females there were 92.8 males, and for every 100 females age 18 and over there were 89.8 males age 18 and over.

0.0% of residents lived in urban areas, while 100.0% lived in rural areas.

There were 793 households in Mount Jackson, of which 30.8% had children under the age of 18 living in them. Of all households, 44.9% were married-couple households, 18.2% were households with a male householder and no spouse or partner present, and 28.1% were households with a female householder and no spouse or partner present. About 27.6% of all households were made up of individuals and 11.9% had someone living alone who was 65 years of age or older.

There were 859 housing units, of which 7.7% were vacant. The homeowner vacancy rate was 1.8% and the rental vacancy rate was 4.4%.

Racial composition as of the 2020 census
Race	Number	Percent
White	1,437	73.3%
Black or African American	63	3.2%
American Indian and Alaska Native	20	1.0%
Asian	14	0.7%
Native Hawaiian and Other Pacific Islander	0	0.0%
Some other race	244	12.4%
Two or more races	183	9.3%
Hispanic or Latino (of any race)	466	23.8%

=== 2000 census ===
As of the census of 2000, there were 1,664 people, 667 households, and 440 families residing in the town. The population density was 1,353.7 people per square mile (522.3/km^{2}). There were 718 housing units at an average density of 584.1 per square mile (225.4/km^{2}). The racial makeup of the town was 87.74% White, 0.66% African American, 0.12% Native American, 0.30% Asian, 0.12% Pacific Islander, 9.68% from other races, and 1.38% from two or more races. Hispanic or Latino of any race were 14.12% of the population.

There were 667 households, out of which 29.7% had children under the age of 18 living with them, 49.2% were married couples living together, 12.6% had a female householder with no husband present, and 34.0% were non-families. 29.1% of all households were made up of individuals, and 15.0% had someone living alone who was 65 years of age or older. The average household size was 2.49 and the average family size was 3.01.

In the town, the population was spread out, with 24.5% under the age of 18, 9.4% from 18 to 24, 29.5% from 25 to 44, 20.7% from 45 to 64, and 15.8% who were 65 years of age or older. The median age was 36 years. For every 100 females, there were 97.4 males. For every 100 females aged 18 and over, there were 94.7 males.

The median income for a household in the town was $32,471, and the median income for a family was $39,423. Males had a median income of $29,464 versus $20,417 for females. The per capita income for the town was $15,004. About 7.1% of families and 10.6% of the population were below the poverty line, including 12.5% of those under age 18 and 16.3% of those age 65 or over.

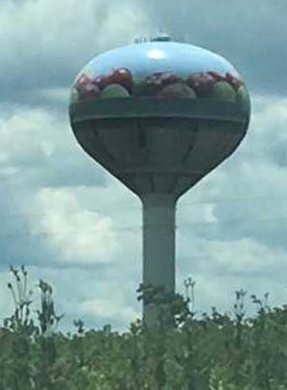
Mount Jackson water tower
