= Anders Rudolph Rude =

Danish priest

Anders Rudolph Rude (October 25, 1812 in Copenhagen – May 21, 1883 in Georgetown, Texas) was a Danish-American Lutheran minister and theologian. Having graduated from the University of Copenhagen he emigrated to the United States of America in 1836, arriving in Boston. He settled in Virginia and graduated again from the Gettysburg seminary and was ordained as a minister in Woodstock, Virginia. He married Anne Steenbergen née Caperton, and took over the administration of the plantation of her late husband located at Locusts Grove in Shenandoah County, Virginia. There he built a church on the hill which was later to take his name, Rude's Hill. During the American Civil War he lost everything as the plantation came to be used as the headquarters for General Stonewall Jackson in 1862. He lost his wife and daughter as the Confederate and Union forces struggled over the Shenandoah Valley from 1862 to 1864.

Another Dane, Ole R. Olsen recounted that fighting in the Union Army he participated in the looting of the Rude home. He noted Danish items in the house and cursed at the house's elderly owner in Danish. He saw that Rude understood his curses, but he received no response to taunts from his compatriot who remained silent.

Rude's son William Steenbergen Rude volunteered for the Confederate Army. After the Civil War, Rude relocated to Texas where he became a minister and professor. He died there in 1883.
