= J. P. McKee Lustron House =

Historic house in Alabama, United States

- U.S. National Register of Historic Places
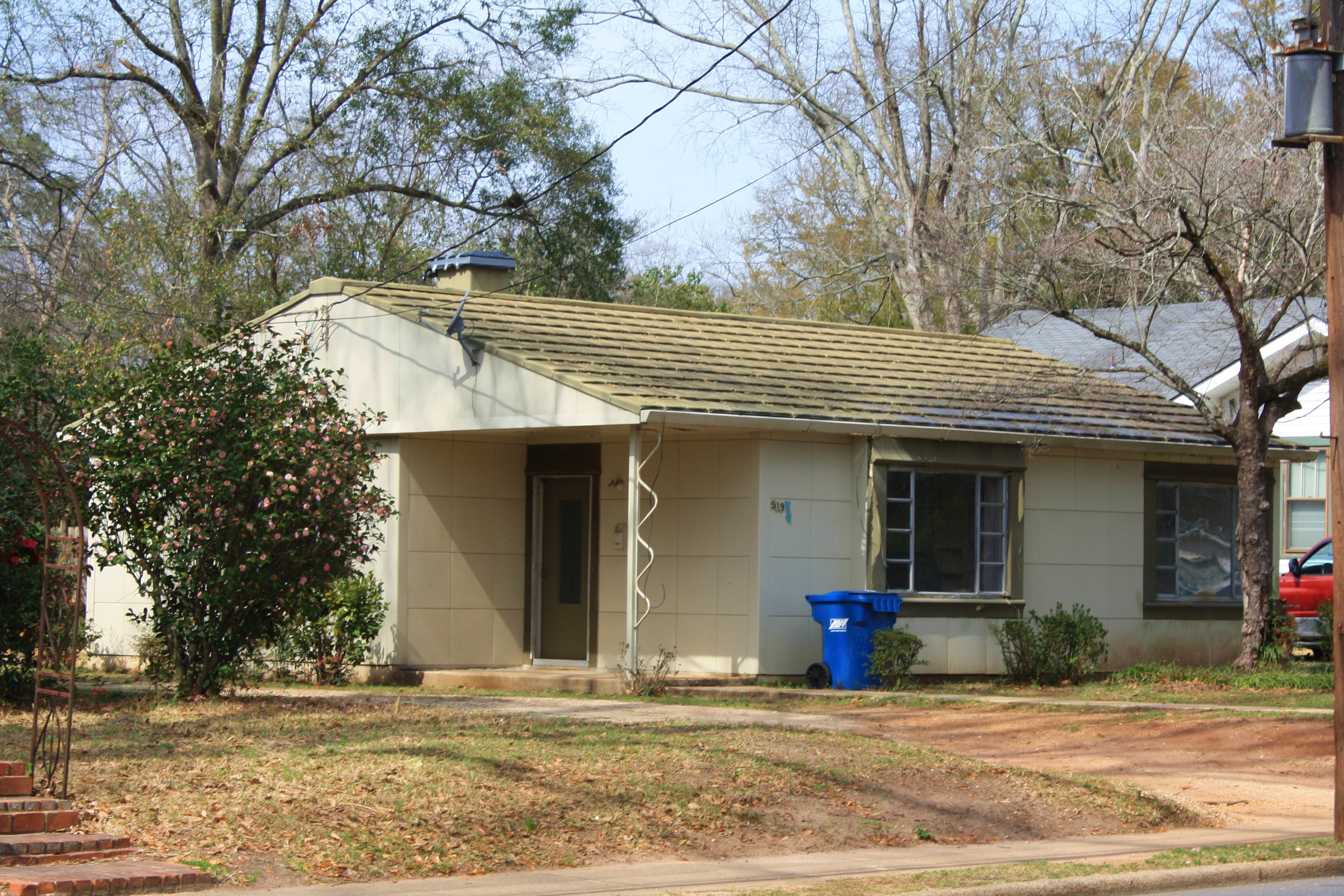

- Location within Alabama Location within the United States
- Location: 519 College Avenue, Jackson, Alabama
- Coordinates: 31°31′0″N 87°53′43″W
- Area: less than one acre
- Built: 1949
- Architect: Koch, Carl & Associates; Lustron Corporation
- Architectural style: Lustron house
- MPS: Lustron Houses in Alabama, MPS
- NRHP reference No.: 00000132
- Added to NRHP: February 24, 2000

The J. P. McKee Lustron House is a historic enameled steel prefabricated house in Jackson, Alabama, United States. Designed and constructed by the Lustron Corporation, this example is one of two in Jackson. The other, the Doit W. McClellan Lustron House, is just around the corner from the McKee Lustron.

Lustron houses were only produced during a two-year period, with 2,495 known to have been made. Only roughly 2,000 of these are still in existence. Many of those that do remain have been altered significantly. Twenty Lustron houses are known to have been ordered in Alabama, although it is not clear if twenty were erected. Only eleven remained in 2000. Architectural historians with the Alabama Historical Commission believe that the two in Jackson may have been the first erected in the state.

The house forms part of the National Register of Historic Places' Lustron Houses in Alabama MPS. It was placed on the National Register on February 24, 2000, due to its architectural significance.

== History ==
Both of the Lustron houses in Jackson were erected in 1949 by a local Lustron dealer, J. P. McKee of McKee Construction Company. An open house for both Lustrons was held beginning on April 16, 1949. As of 2000, the exteriors of both houses were in near–to–original condition. Both were being utilized as rental properties.

== Architecture ==
The J. P. McKee Lustron House is an example of Lustron's "Westchester" 2-bedroom model. It retains the original enameled steel roof, wall panels, and "zig-zag" support column. Lustron houses came in four exterior colors, the McKee Lustron is in the company's "Desert Tan" color.
