= Jackson, Alabama =

City in Alabama, United States

Jackson
- City
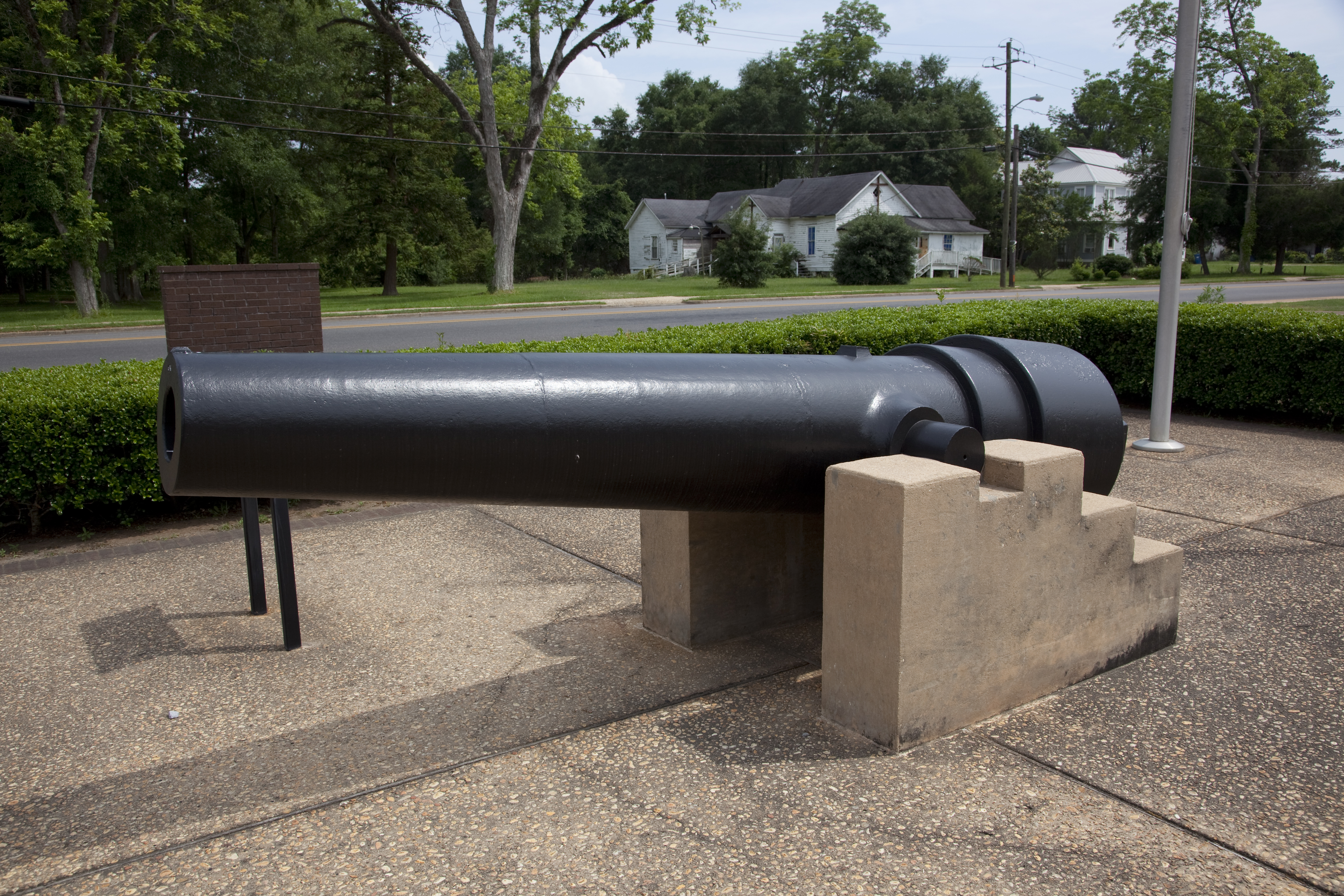
- Brooke rifle in front of the Jackson City Hall

- Flag Seal
- Nickname: The Pine City
- Location of Jackson in Clarke County, Alabama.
- Coordinates: 31°31′20″N 87°52′28″W
- Country: United States
- State: Alabama
- County: Clarke

Area
  - Total: 15.83 sq mi (41.00 km^{2})
  - Land: 15.64 sq mi (40.50 km^{2})
  - Water: 0.19 sq mi (0.50 km^{2})
- Elevation: 279 ft (85 m)

Population (2020)
  - Total: 4,748
  - Density: 303.6/sq mi (117.22/km^{2})
- Time zone: UTC-6 (Central (CST))
  - Summer (DST): UTC-5 (CDT)
- ZIP codes: 36501, 36515, 36545
- Area code: 251
- FIPS code: 01-38152
- GNIS feature ID: 2404775
- Website: cityofjacksonal.com

Jackson is a city in Clarke County, Alabama, United States. The population was 4,748 at the 2020 census. It was one of three wet settlements in an otherwise-dry county.

== Geography ==
Jackson is located along the western border of Clarke County at coordinates 31.521°N 87.891°W, on a rise overlooking east bank of the Tombigbee River. According to the U.S. Census Bureau, the city has a total area of 15.8 square miles (41.0 km^{2}), of which 15.6 square miles (40.5 km^{2}) is land and 0.19 square miles (0.5 km^{2}), or 1.21%, is water.

Jackson sits across the Tombigbee River from Washington County, Alabama.

=== Climate ===
Jackson has a humid subtropical climate (Köppen: Cfa) with long, hot summers and short, mild winters.

Climate data for Jackson, Alabama, 1991–2020 normals, extremes 1965–present
Month	Jan	Feb	Mar	Apr	May	Jun	Jul	Aug	Sep	Oct	Nov	Dec	Year
Record high °F (°C)	83 (28)	86 (30)	89 (32)	95 (35)	98 (37)	103 (39)	104 (40)	104 (40)	100 (38)	98 (37)	89 (32)	86 (30)	104 (40)
Mean maximum °F (°C)	76.0 (24.4)	78.5 (25.8)	84.0 (28.9)	86.6 (30.3)	92.2 (33.4)	95.3 (35.2)	97.0 (36.1)	96.6 (35.9)	94.4 (34.7)	89.1 (31.7)	81.8 (27.7)	77.9 (25.5)	98.2 (36.8)
Mean daily maximum °F (°C)	59.9 (15.5)	64.1 (17.8)	71.4 (21.9)	77.5 (25.3)	84.5 (29.2)	89.5 (31.9)	91.2 (32.9)	91.2 (32.9)	87.2 (30.7)	78.7 (25.9)	68.7 (20.4)	61.9 (16.6)	77.2 (25.1)
Daily mean °F (°C)	47.9 (8.8)	51.7 (10.9)	58.4 (14.7)	64.4 (18.0)	72.1 (22.3)	78.6 (25.9)	80.8 (27.1)	80.6 (27.0)	76.2 (24.6)	66.0 (18.9)	55.7 (13.2)	50.1 (10.1)	65.2 (18.5)
Mean daily minimum °F (°C)	36.0 (2.2)	39.3 (4.1)	45.4 (7.4)	51.3 (10.7)	59.7 (15.4)	67.7 (19.8)	70.5 (21.4)	70.0 (21.1)	65.3 (18.5)	53.4 (11.9)	42.6 (5.9)	38.2 (3.4)	53.3 (11.8)
Mean minimum °F (°C)	20.1 (−6.6)	23.4 (−4.8)	28.3 (−2.1)	36.3 (2.4)	46.4 (8.0)	59.1 (15.1)	65.9 (18.8)	63.5 (17.5)	52.5 (11.4)	36.9 (2.7)	27.6 (−2.4)	24.0 (−4.4)	18.1 (−7.7)
Record low °F (°C)	3 (−16)	11 (−12)	18 (−8)	29 (−2)	39 (4)	48 (9)	56 (13)	57 (14)	40 (4)	28 (−2)	18 (−8)	6 (−14)	3 (−16)
Average precipitation inches (mm)	5.72 (145)	5.46 (139)	5.52 (140)	4.74 (120)	3.95 (100)	6.26 (159)	5.40 (137)	5.17 (131)	4.37 (111)	3.75 (95)	4.35 (110)	5.52 (140)	60.21 (1,527)
Average snowfall inches (cm)	0.0 (0.0)	0.0 (0.0)	0.0 (0.0)	0.0 (0.0)	0.0 (0.0)	0.0 (0.0)	0.0 (0.0)	0.0 (0.0)	0.0 (0.0)	0.0 (0.0)	0.0 (0.0)	0.0 (0.0)	0.0 (0.0)
Average precipitation days (≥ 0.01 in)	10.2	9.3	8.9	7.5	7.6	10.0	12.1	10.4	8.1	6.3	7.6	10.4	108.4
Average snowy days (≥ 0.1 in)	0.0	0.1	0.0	0.0	0.0	0.0	0.0	0.0	0.0	0.0	0.0	0.0	0.1
Source: NOAA

== Demographics ==
Historical population
Census	Pop.	Note	%±
1900	1,039		—
1910	1,379		32.7%
1920	1,331		−3.5%
1930	1,828		37.3%
1940	2,039		11.5%
1950	3,072		50.7%
1960	4,959		61.4%
1970	5,957		20.1%
1980	6,073		1.9%
1990	5,819		−4.2%
2000	5,419		−6.9%
2010	5,228		−3.5%
2020	4,748		−9.2%
U.S. Decennial Census; 2013 Estimate

=== 2020 census ===
As of the 2020 census, Jackson had a population of 4,748. The median age was 44.5 years. 21.1% of residents were under the age of 18 and 21.7% were 65 years of age or older. For every 100 females there were 88.1 males, and for every 100 females age 18 and over there were 81.3 males age 18 and over.

0.0% of residents lived in urban areas, while 100.0% lived in rural areas.

There were 2,026 households in Jackson, including 1,112 families; 29.6% had children under the age of 18 living in them. Of all households, 39.9% were married-couple households, 18.4% were households with a male householder and no spouse or partner present, and 37.7% were households with a female householder and no spouse or partner present. About 33.8% of all households were made up of individuals and 15.1% had someone living alone who was 65 years of age or older.

There were 2,331 housing units, of which 13.1% were vacant. The homeowner vacancy rate was 3.2% and the rental vacancy rate was 9.6%.

Racial composition as of the 2020 census
Race	Number	Percent
White	2,394	50.4%
Black or African American	2,160	45.5%
American Indian and Alaska Native	20	0.4%
Asian	37	0.8%
Native Hawaiian and Other Pacific Islander	1	0.0%
Some other race	23	0.5%
Two or more races	113	2.4%
Hispanic or Latino (of any race)	46	1.0%

=== 2010 census ===
At the 2010 census there were 5,228 people, 2,112 households, and 1,446 families living in the city. The population density was 334 inhabitants per square mile (129/km^{2}). There were 2,426 housing units at an average density of 153.5 per square mile (59.3/km^{2}). The racial makeup of the city was 54.9% White, 42.9% African American, 0.7% Native American, 0.4% Asian, 0.3% from other races, and 0.8% from two or more races. Hispanic or Latino of any race were 1.4%.

Of the 2,112 households 28.4% had children under the age of 18 living with them, 46.6% were married couples living together, 17.9% had a female householder with no husband present, and 31.5% were non-families. 29.4% of households were one person and 10.8% were one person aged 65 or older. The average household size was 2.44 and the average family size was 3.00.

The age distribution was 25.1% under the age of 18, 6.9% from 18 to 24, 23.6% from 25 to 44, 26.8% from 45 to 64, and 17.5% 65 or older. The median age was 40.4 years. For every 100 females, there were 87.7 males. For every 100 females age 18 and over, there were 88.9 males.

The median household income was $32,917 and the median family income was $46,328. Males had a median income of $54,688 versus $29,483 for females. The per capita income for the city was $21,822. About 21.9% of families and 29.0% of the population were below the poverty line, including 37.4% of those under age 18 and 18.3% of those age 65 or over.

=== 2000 census ===
At the 2000 census there were 5,419 people, 2,094 households, and 1,507 families living in the city. The population density was 358.7 inhabitants per square mile (138.5/km^{2}). There were 2,341 housing units at an average density of 155.0 per square mile (59.8/km^{2}). The racial makeup of the city was 60.42% White, 38.49% African American, 0.26% Native American, 0.37% Asian, 0.20% from other races, and 0.26% from two or more races. Hispanic or Latino of any race were 0.65%.

Of the 2,094 households 34.0% had children under the age of 18 living with them, 53.5% were married couples living together, 15.8% had a female householder with no husband present, and 28.0% were non-families. 26.3% of households were one person and 12.2% were one person aged 65 or older. The average household size was 2.54 and the average family size was 3.08.

The age distribution was 26.6% under the age of 18, 8.1% from 18 to 24, 27.2% from 25 to 44, 22.5% from 45 to 64, and 15.5% 65 or older. The median age was 38 years. For every 100 females, there were 85.8 males. For every 100 females age 18 and over, there were 80.4 males.

The median household income was $34,806 and the median family income was $45,516. Males had a median income of $43,558 versus $21,125 for females. The per capita income for the city was $17,346. About 15.3% of families and 21.2% of the population were below the poverty line, including 27.9% of those under age 18 and 20.1% of those age 65 or over.

== History ==
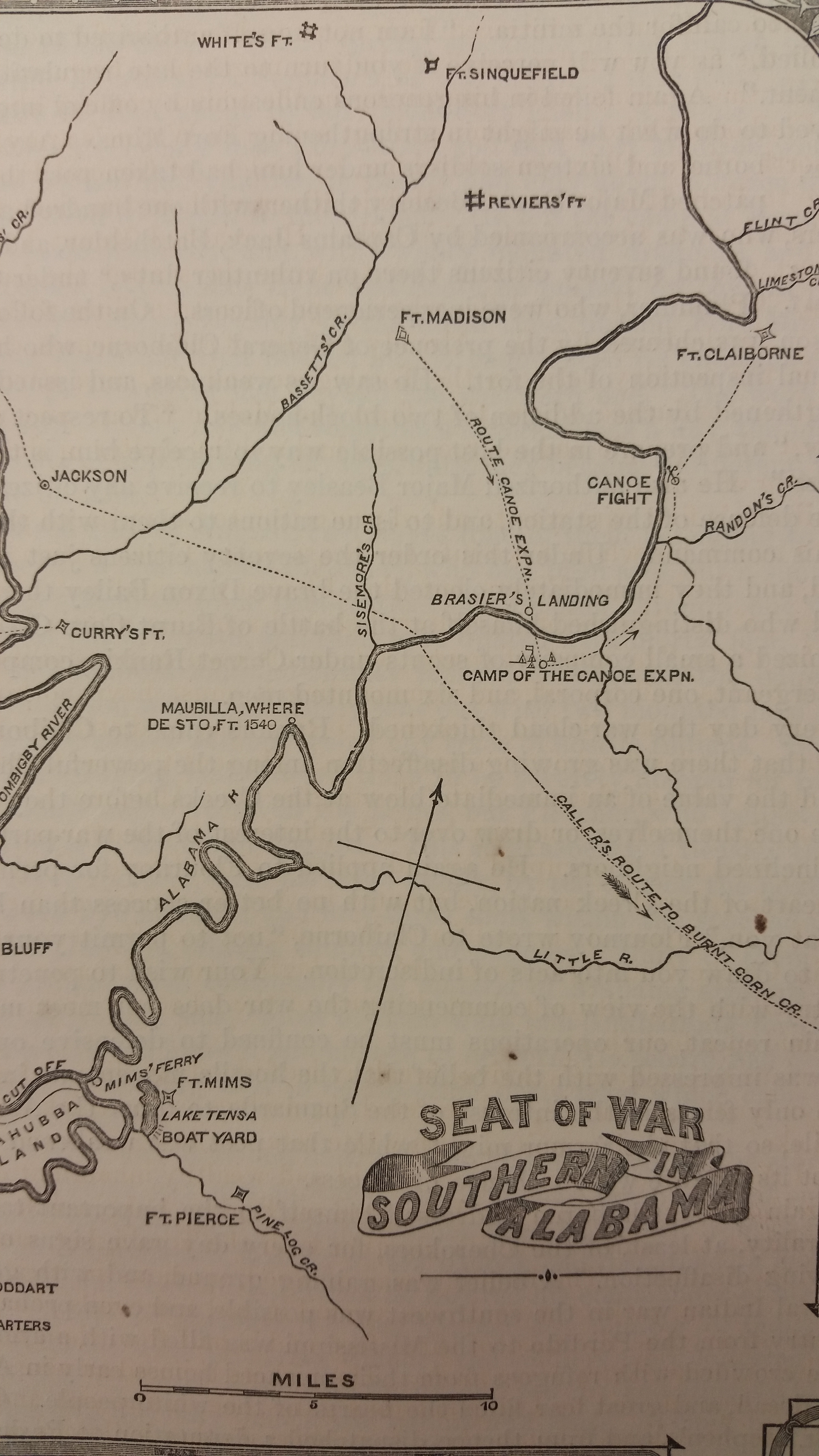
Map of Alabama during the War of 1812

Jackson was founded in 1816 and is named after President Andrew Jackson. Former names for the city include Pine Level and Republicville.

During the Civil War, a Confederate fort was established on the banks of the Tombigbee River. It was named Fort Carney and was positioned on Carney's Bluff just south of Jackson. The cannon that was on the bluff now sits in front of City Hall.

Jackson has four sites listed on the National Register of Historic Places. They are the Jackson Historic District, Clarke Mills, Doit W. McClellan Lustron House, and J. P. McKee Lustron House.

During World War II, a prisoner-of-war camp was built and operated holding 253 captured German soldiers on Ocre Avenue. The camp was opened April 6, 1945, and closed March 12, 1946. Many of the prisoners were members of the Afrika Korps.

== Economy ==
The economy of Jackson is driven by the timber industry. Packaging Corporation of America has a paper mill that is the largest employer located in the city.

== Education ==
- Coastal Alabama Community College
- Jackson Academy
- Jackson Middle School
- Jackson High School
- Jackson Intermediate
- Joe M. Gillmore Elementary
- Walker Springs Baptist Church

== Notable people ==
- Ann Bedsole (born 1930), member of both houses of the Alabama State Legislature 1979–1995
- Stew Bolen (1902–1969), former Major League Baseball player
- Antonio Chatman (born 1979), NFL wide receiver
- Jimmy Outlaw (1913–2006), former Major League Baseball player
- Samaje Perine (born 1995), NFL Running-Back
- Ray Prim (1906–1995), former Major League Baseball pitcher, raised in Jackson
- Jamaal Pritchett (born 2003), NFL Wide Receiver
- John "Jabo" Starks (1938–2018), funk and blues drummer
- Travis and Bob, musical duo
