= Clarke Mills =

- U.S. National Register of Historic Places
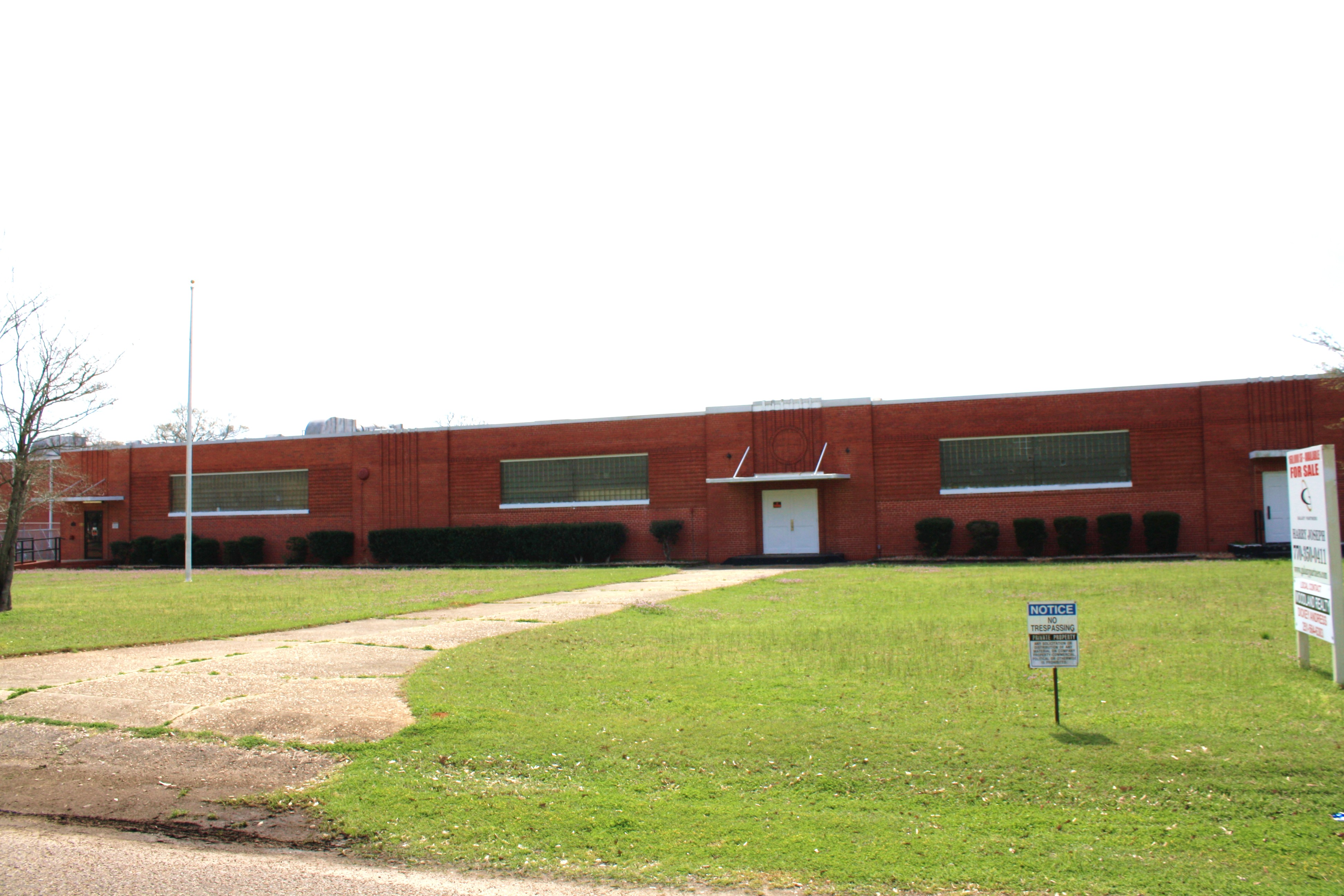
- The 1939 building in 2011

- Location within Alabama Location within the United States
- Location: 301 West Church Street, Jackson, Alabama
- Coordinates: 31°30′33″N 87°53′50″W
- Built: 1939
- Architect: H.B. Bieberstein, Guest & Son of Anderson, SC
- Architectural style: Moderne
- MPS: Clarke County MPS
- NRHP reference No.: 98000411
- Added to NRHP: April 30, 1998

Clarke Mills or Vanity Fair Mills is a historic textile factory building in Jackson, Alabama, United States. It was designed in the Moderne style by H.B. Bieberstein. The facility was completed in 1939 and was occupied by the Vanity Fair Corporation throughout much of its history. Clarke Mills was added to the National Register of Historic Places on April 30, 1998.
