= Mount Jackson Historic District =

Historic district in Virginia, United States

- U.S. National Register of Historic Places
- U.S. Historic district
- Virginia Landmarks Register
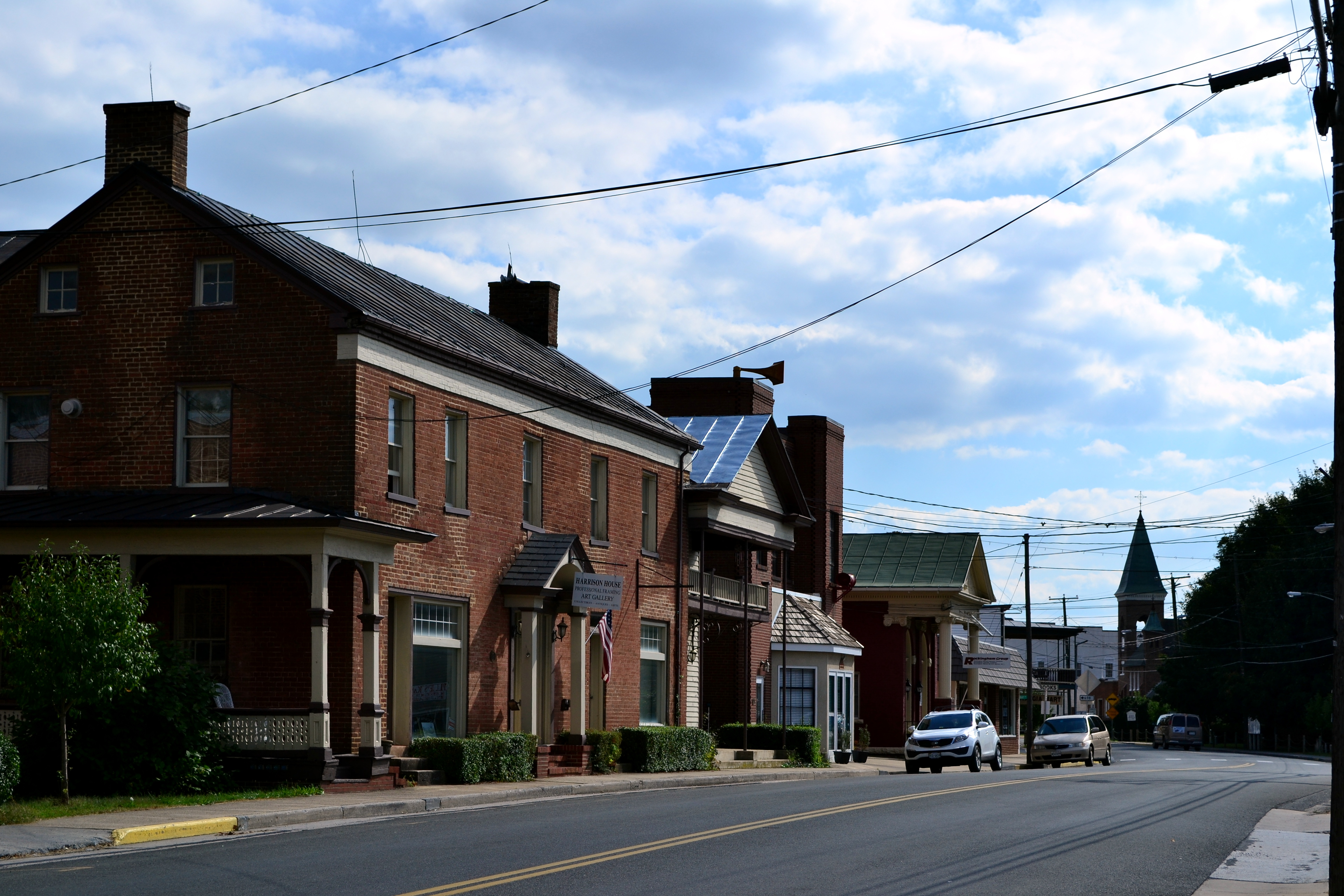
- Mount Jackson Historic District, September 2013

- Location within Virginia Location within the United States
- Location: Main, King, Gospel, Broad, Bridge, Race, Clifford, Tisinger and Wunder Sts. and Orkney Dr., Mount Jackson, Virginia
- Coordinates: 38°44′44″N 78°38′35″W
- Area: 75 acres (30 ha)
- Built: 1826
- Built by: Shannon, Harold
- Architectural style: Queen Anne, Federal, Gothic Revival
- NRHP reference No.: 93000541
- VLR No.: 265-0004

Significant dates
- Added to NRHP: June 17, 1993
- Designated VLR: April 21, 1993

Mount Jackson Historic District is a national historic district located at Mount Jackson, Shenandoah County, Virginia.

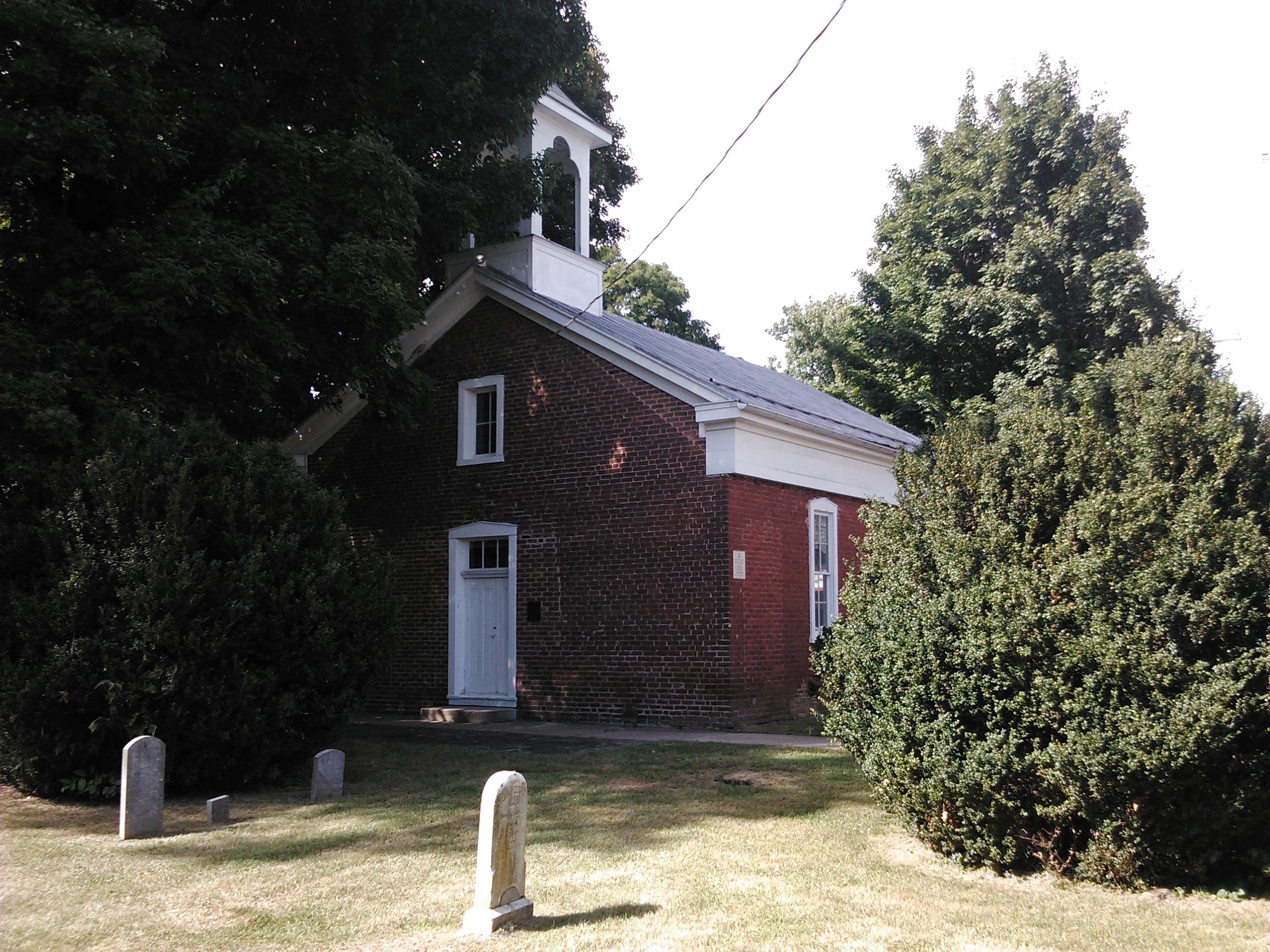

Mount Jackson became relatively wealthy because of its location, at the intersection of a major north–south road across the Shenandoah Valley and an east–west creek, with a mill and later a railroad line fostering development. The town saw significant fighting in the American Civil War, and was occupied by soldiers of both armies at various times. Historic buildings range from the historic nondenominational Union Church (built 1825) and cemetery (which contains the grave of Revolutionary War veteran Daniel Gray and others to modern times), to the site of a former Confederate Hospital north of town (on the historic road to Winchester and later Frederick, Maryland) and Union encampment at Rude's Hill about three miles south of town.

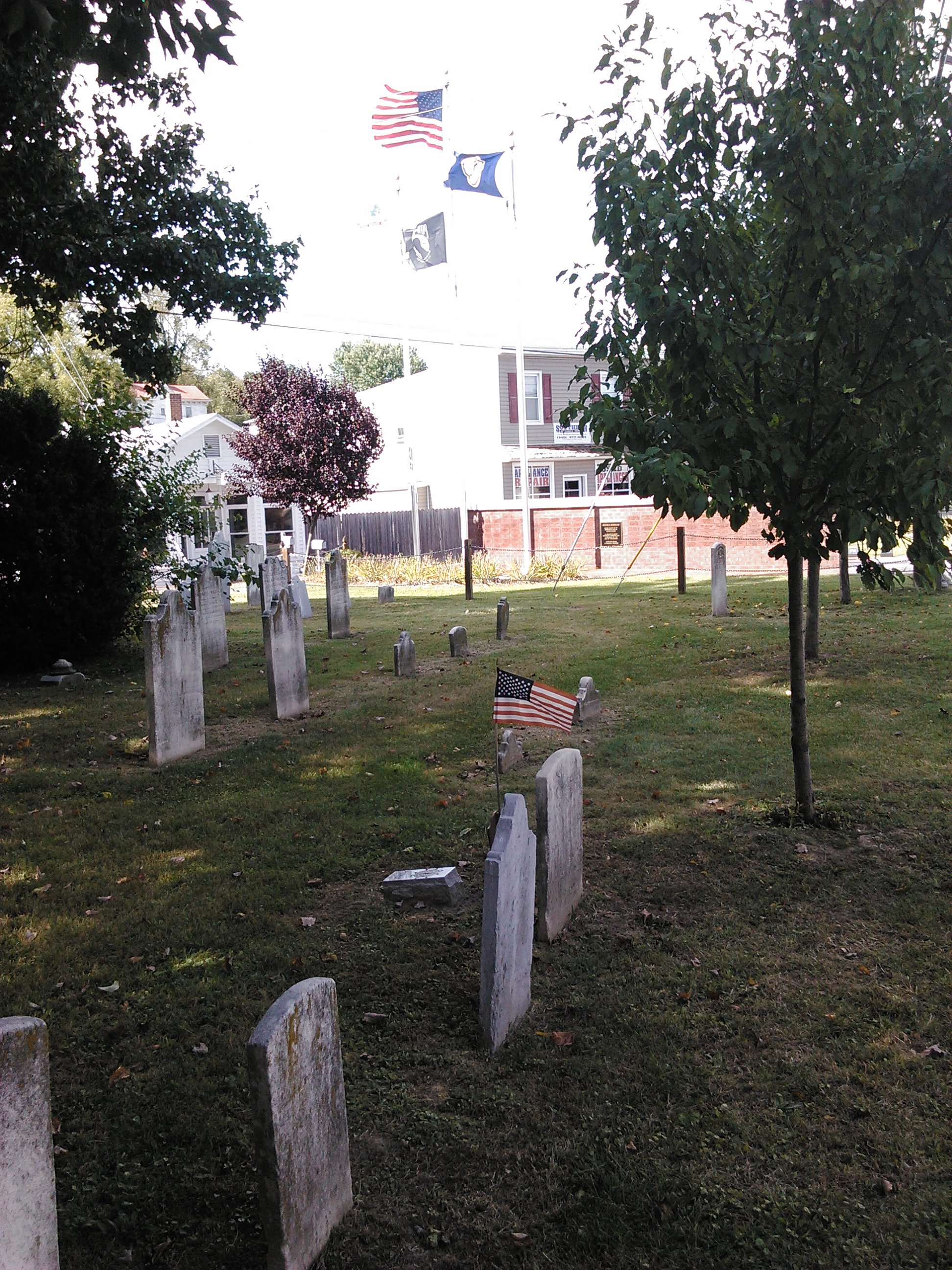

The district encompasses 125 contributing buildings, 1 contributing site, and 2 contributing structures in the town of Mount Jackson. It includes a variety of commercial, residential, and institutional buildings dating primarily from the late-19th to the early-20th century, the era of the town's greatest prosperity. They are in a variety of popular architectural styles including Gothic Revival, Federal, and Queen Anne. Other notable buildings include the Stoneburner House, Tisinger House, S. P. Lonas House, Brill Building, Lonas Store, former Peoples Bank (c. 1904), Mt. Jackson Volunteer Fire Department (1936), Mt. Jackson Theatre Building (1938), St. Andrew's Episcopal Church (1876), Mt. Jackson Methodist Episcopal Church (1884), and Triplett Middle School (1925).

The historic district was listed on the National Register of Historic Places in 1993.
