= J. W. R. Moore House =

Historic house in Virginia, United States

- J.W.R. Moore House
- U.S. National Register of Historic Places
- Virginia Landmarks Register
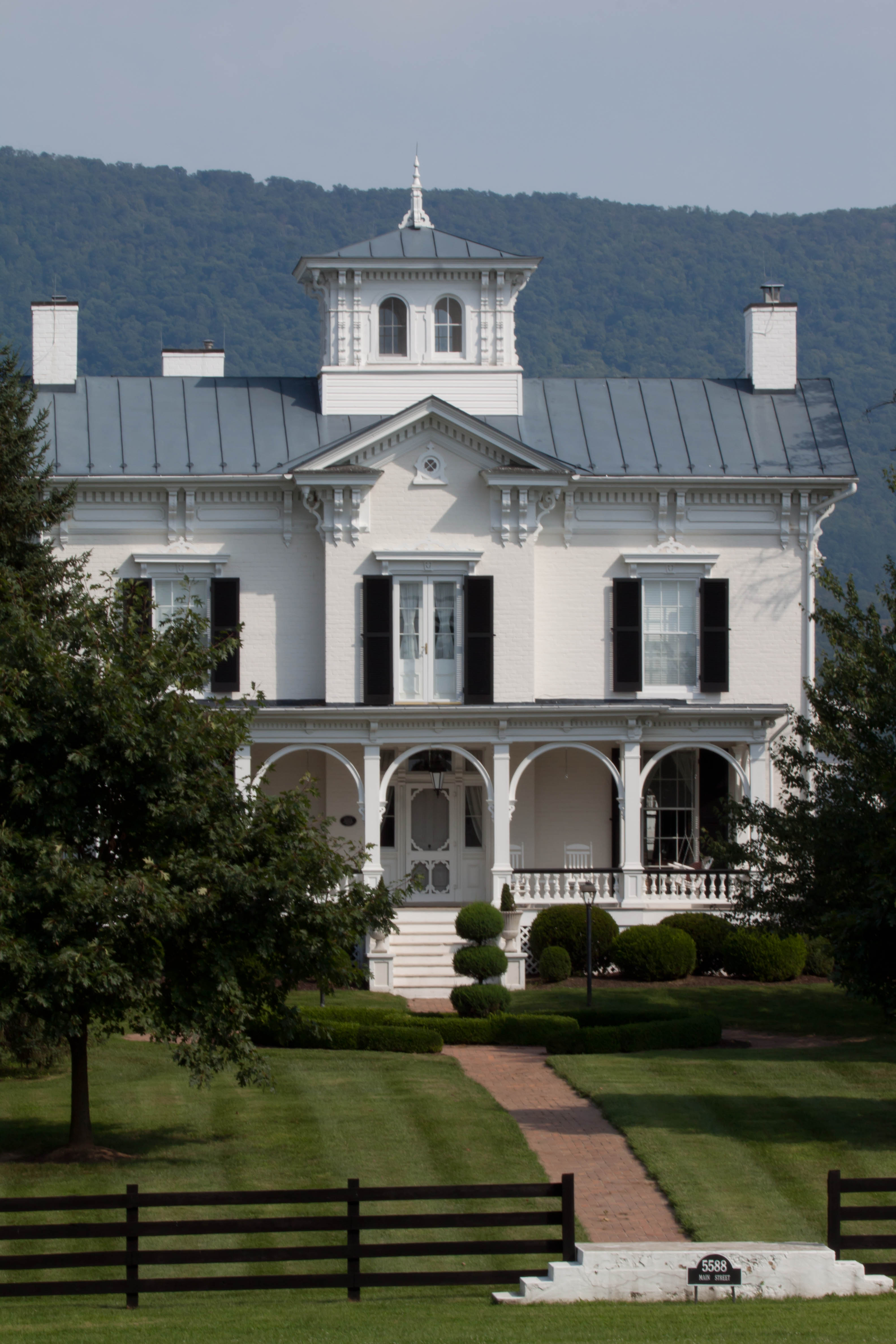
- J.W.R. Moore House, August 2012

- Location within Virginia Location within the United States
- Location: 5588 Main St., Mount Jackson, Virginia
- Coordinates: 38°45′13″N 78°38′5″W
- Area: 5.6 acres (2.3 ha)
- Built: 1871
- Architectural style: Italianate
- NRHP reference No.: 05001275
- VLR No.: 265-5002

Significant dates
- Added to NRHP: November 16, 2005
- Designated VLR: September 14, 2005

J.W.R. Moore House, also known as the J.W. Miller House and J.C. Biller House, is a historic home located at Mount Jackson, Shenandoah County, Virginia. It was built in 1871, and is a two-story, three-bay, L-shaped brick dwelling in the Italianate style. It features elaborate wood trim and a large, square belvedere with a tall finial. Also on the property are the contributing brick combination icehouse / smokehouse / summer kitchen (c. 1871) and a frame tenant house. It was listed on the National Register of Historic Places in 2005.
