= Rude's Hill =

Hill in Shenandoah County, Virginia, US

Coordinates: 38°42′08″N 78°38′41″W

Rude's Hill is a 981-foot hill just outside of the town of Mt. Jackson in Shenandoah County, Virginia, United States, primarily known because it was a strategically placed elevation on which many Civil War events occurred. It was named after the Danish Lutheran minister Anders Rudolph Rude, who arrived in the US in 1836 and married the widow of the Steenbergen plantation. They inhabited a house on the hill called "Locust Grove" which dates to 1792, according to county records. As of July 2014 when the property was for sale, "Locust Grove" was in severely neglected condition with several ungainly exterior modifications over the years, but was still standing.

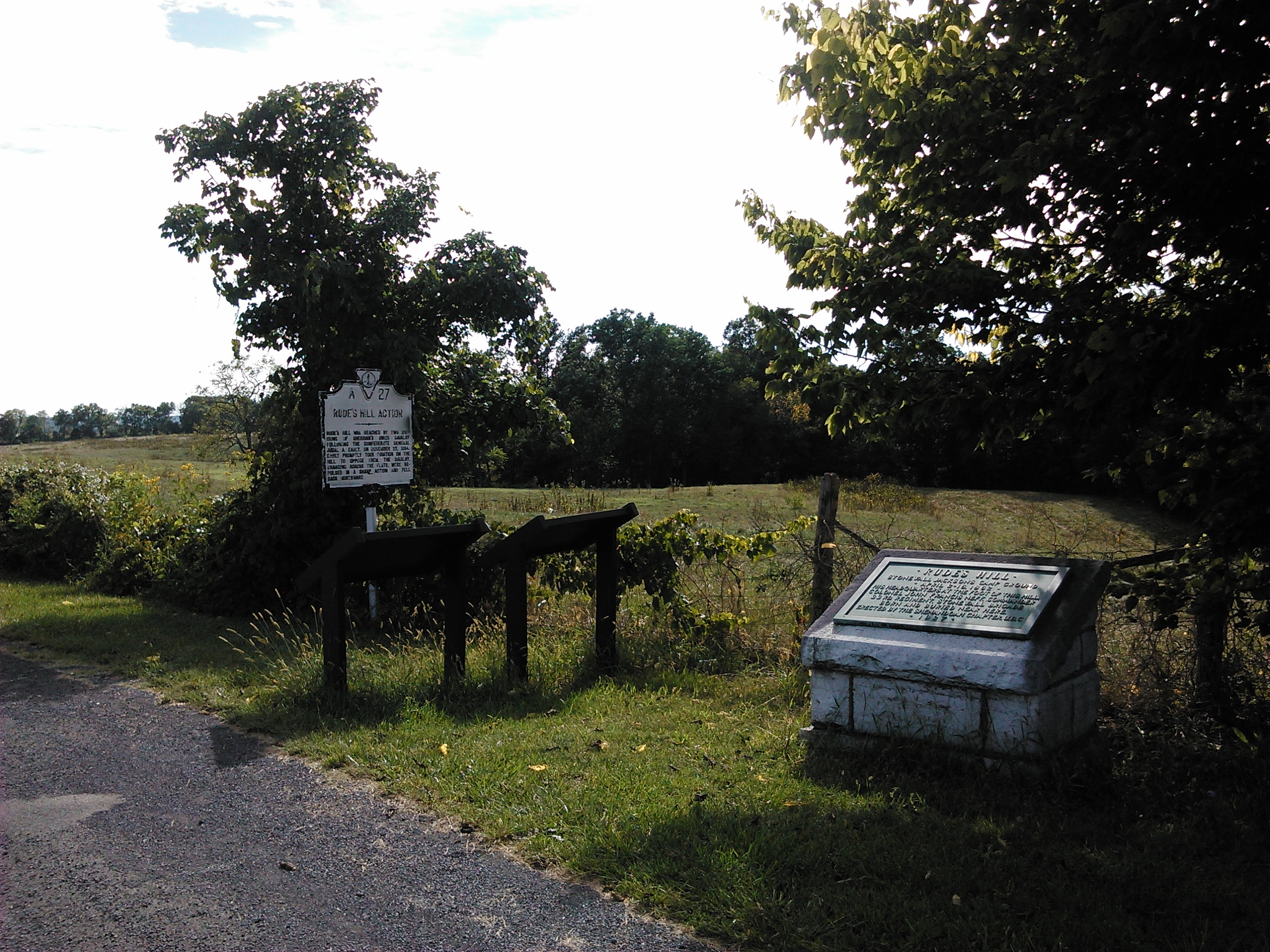
Memorial markers on Rude's Hill, which was featured in significant strategic events during the Civil War.

Rude's Hill was an important site in the American Civil War, occupying a commanding high point overlooking the key Valley Turnpike where is passes through a point between Smith Creek on the east and the North Fork of the Shenandoah River on the western side. Rude's Hill is the first elevation on that route beyond the flat Meems bottomland on the south end of the town of Mt. Jackson. It was a particularly defensible high ground because the only practical enemy approach to Rude's Hill was from the north was via single bridges spanning Mill Creek and the Shenandoah's north fork, after which an enemy would need to cross the broad, flat Meems Bottom, commanded by Rude's Hill beyond. And also because if required to retreat, a force could withdraw from Rude's Hill through mountain passes of the Massanutten Range. Because of its strategic placement and high ground location on the Valley Pike and the fact the area had so much action between 1862 and 1865, Rude's Hill figured prominently in the Civil War history of the Shenandoah Valley.

== 1862 ==
In Shenandoah Valley campaign, following initial tactical defeat at the First Battle Of Kernstown (March 23, 1862), Confederate General Stonewall Jackson withdrew down the valley to Rude's Hill upon the advice of his newly appointed cartographer Jedidiah Hotchkiss and made Locust Grove his headquarters from April 2–17, 1862. There he rallied his troops and reorganized his command, with his forces swelling to 6,000 men on Rude's Hill. On April 16–17, 1862 there was a skirmish at Rude's Hill with advance elements of the Union forces. With Maj. Gen. Nathaniel P. Banks approaching with 20,000 troops, Jackson was planning to make a stand on Rude's Hill but his cavalry, under pressure of the Union's skirmishing advance on the 16th, had failed to destroy the gateway bridge over Mill Creek at Mt. Jackson. So Jackson withdrew south on April 17, but ultimately defeated Union generals in a series of moves and battles up and down the Shenandoah Valley from May to June, 1862.

During the war the property suffered heavy damage, so Rev. Rude left in the autumn of 1862. In Texas he became a minister and Professor, but this hill continued to reflect his family name. Jackson's dispatches from this headquarters bore the dateline, “Rude’s Hill," a name that stuck due to its continuing role in the war. After 1862, the house was evidently occupied by Reverend Addison Weller and his wife, both Methodists.

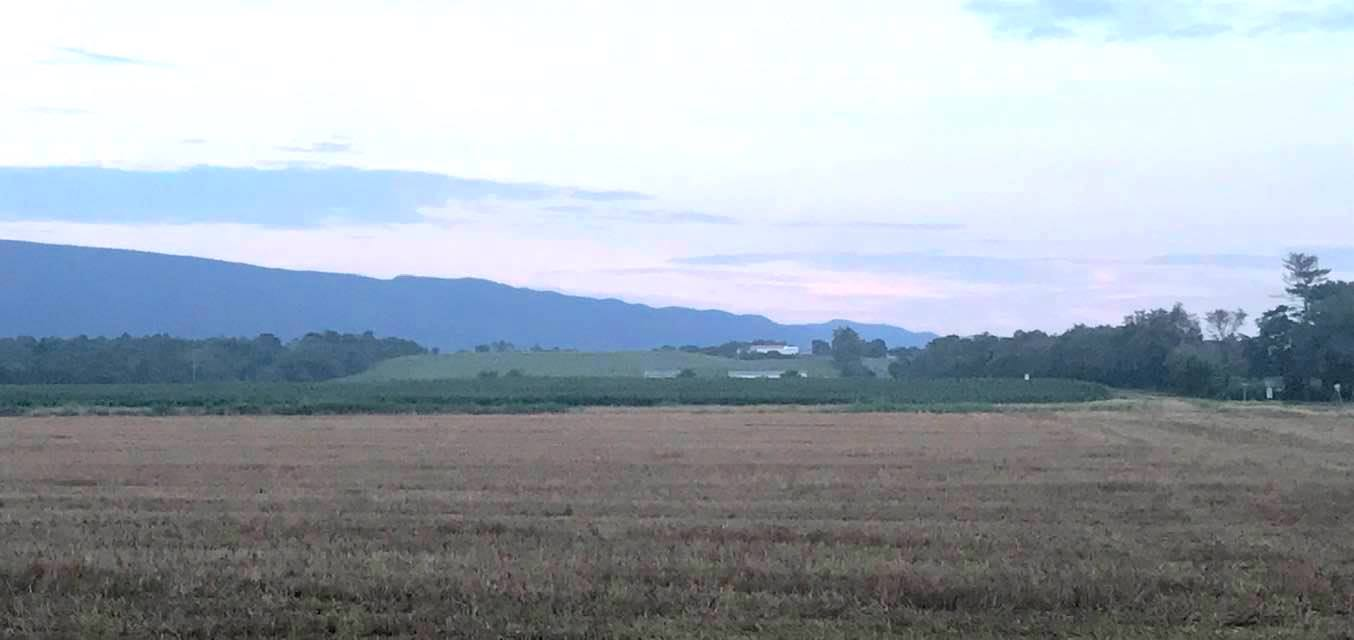
Rude's Hill, seen from the flatlands of Meems Bottom. This is the viewpoint which Union forces would have had in various points during the war, approaching Confederate positions defending the hill. The Valley Turnipike (now Rt.11) is on the far right. The Massantten mountains are in the distance.

== 1863 ==
On November 16–18, 1863 Col. William H. Boyd's Union cavalry reconnoitered from West Virginia to the area of the Valley Pike. The Federal troopers skirmished at Woodstock, Edinburg and Mt. Jackson. North of Mt. Jackson the Federals encountered Confederate cavalry under command of Maj. Robert White. The rebel troopers retreated through Mt. Jackson fighting, crossing the bridges through Meems Bottom and to the defensible position on Rude's Hill. Realizing that White's horse artillery could sweep the bridge from the hill, Boyd withdrew from the skirmish at Rude's Hill and then to Woodstock, pursued by Confederate cavalry. Boyd's reconnaissance-in-force then returned to West Virginia. Losses from the cavalry engagement were light on both sides.

== 1864 ==
Rude's Hill figured prominently in the action of the Battle of New Market. On May 14, a delaying action was fought at Rude's Hill by elements of the Confederate 18th Virginia Cavalry, under the overall command of Col. John Imboden. Federal forces under Col. August Moor took the hill. However, the Confederate cavalry slowed the Union advance, enabling Gen. John Breckinridge to gather the main body of his Confederate forces at New Market, about 4 miles away. After losing the battle on May 15, Union General Franz Sigel managed to organize a rearguard on Rude's Hill, with infantry east of the turnpike, some cavalry west of the road and the artillery behind the line. Due to the exhaustion of the men and low ammunition, Sigel decided to retreat across the Shenandoah River to Mount Jackson. Breckinridge at the same time, concerned the Federals might decide to use Rude's Hill to make a defensive stand, advanced his cavalry and artillery to the crest of Rude's Hill, where they shelled and harassed Sigel's retreating Federals. The Union army managed to cross Mill Creek at Mt. Jackson and burned the bridge that spanned the creek to Mt. Jackson before the Confederates could catch up. Breckinridge took his main force to Staunton and then east to join with Robert E. Lee's Army of Northern Virginia. Imboden took command in the valley and camped at Rude's Hill.

On May 21 Maj. Gen David Hunter took over Sigel's Union command and proceeded again south, through Woodstock and Mt. Jackson and encamped on the high ground at Rude's Hill on May 29. Hunter then proceeded south taking large towns and destroying anything of perceived military value.

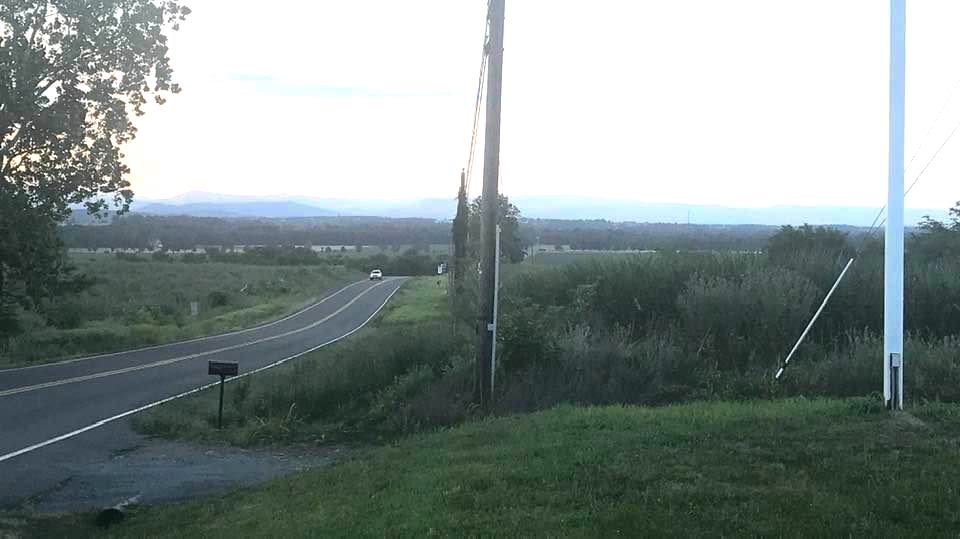
The view from Rude's Hill looking down the Valley Pike (now Rt. 11) to the approach from Mt. Jackson

In a predawn raid on 3 Oct. 1864, Confederate Captain John McNeill led approximately 50 Confederate rangers against roughly 100 Union troopers of the 8th Ohio Cavalry Regiment guarding a Meems Bottom bridge, a strategic crossing of the Valley Turnpike at Mt. Jackson over the North Fork of the Shenandoah River. The attack lasted just fifteen minutes with most of the Union cavalry captured but McNeill, one of the best-known and feared Confederate partisan raiders as leader of McNeill's Rangers, was mortally wounded. He was taken to Rev. Weller's nearby Locust Grove house on Rude's Hill, where he was left for a period of time until his identity was subsequently discovered by Union General Sheridan's troops. He was secreted away from Rude's Hill by a small band of Confederates when the Federals had temporarily left, thinking he was too incapacitated to move and thus did not need a guard. McNeill was moved to Harrisonburg in Confederate hands, where he died on November 10.

Later in November 1864 the hill overlooking the North Branch of the Shenandoah River and the Valley Turnpike again became a battlefield, as divisions of Philip Sheridan's Union cavalry engaged Confederate General Jubal A. Early. Having routed Early at the Battle of Fisher's Hill on September 22, 1864, and again at the Battle of Cedar Creek, north of Strasburg, on October 19, Sheridan employed scorched earth tactics and destroyed the economic infrastructure of the Shenandoah Valley as part of his 1864 Valley Campaign. Early retreated roughly 33 miles to the highly defensible Rude's Hill, occupying the hill from October 21–31. Early moved his troops north to Woodstock and skirmished, but then fell back again to Rude's Hill by November 12. Two of Sheridan's Union cavalry divisions pursued Early, who rallied and deployed his remaining Confederate infantry in line across the top of the hill on November 22, 1864. The Union cavalry pursued the Confederates but were repulsed in a sharp action. Early then reteated from Rude's Hill to Harrisonburg, eventually retreating to the entrance of the Shenandoah Valley at Browns Gap in the Blue Ridge. Locust Grove manor was looted by Union troops.

== 1865 ==
Towards the end of the war, Rude's Hill was also the scene of a cavalry skirmish when Confederate Brigadier General Thomas Rosser's troopers attacked Union troops guarding Confederate prisoners on March 7, 1865.

At the end of the war Union troops encamped on the strategically placed Rude's Hill as the Federal occupying force for the region, erecting several buildings, including a hospital, using the lumber from the Confederate hospital they demolished on the north side of Mt. Jackson, about 3 miles away. This post was removed in 1875 when Reconstruction occupation ended.

In a notable local occurrence during the early days of Reconstruction, Confederate Capt. George Summers and Sgt. Isaac Newton Koontz were executed on Rude's Hill on June 27, 1865. They were members of the Massanutten Rangers, which disbanded with the Confederate surrender. On May 22 they were in a group travelling to Woodstock to take the oath of allegiance to the Union to obtain parole. Along the way they encountered a Union cavalry guard and for reasons unknown revolvers were drawn and the Confederates robbed the Federals of their horses and property. The men, fearful of retribution, went to the Union camp on Rude's Hill to explain the situation and return the horses and property, and were forgiven. But about a month later they were seized by a different Union commander, brought to Rude's Hill, tied to a stake and shot on June 27.

== Rude's Hill today ==
Historical markers at the crest of Rude's Hill now mark the spot, on the west side of Rt. 11 overlooking the fertile farmland of Meem's Bottom. But the hill, which was such a strategic point on the Valley Pike, is barely discernible by passers-by in today's vehicles moving fast on paved roads. An automotive repair facility is now on the crest of historic Rude's Hill.
