= Jackson Historic District (Jackson, Alabama) =

Historic district in Alabama, United States

- U.S. National Register of Historic Places
- U.S. Historic district
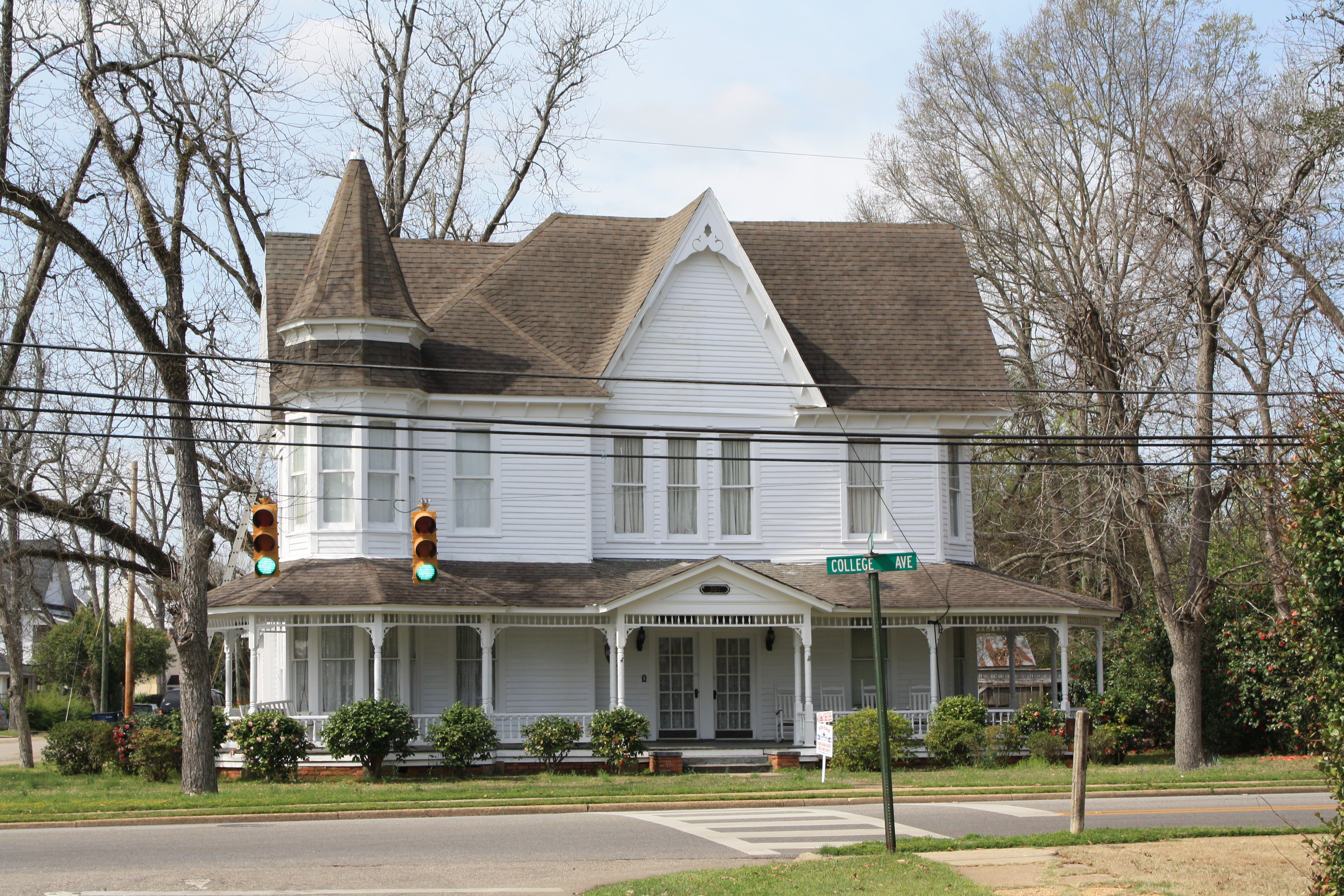

- Location within Alabama Location within the United States
- Location: Roughly along College, Forest, and Carroll Aves., bounded by Cedar, Florida, Commerce, Clinton, and Spruce Sts., Jackson, Alabama
- Coordinates: 31°30′43″N 87°53′44″W
- Area: 180 acres (73 ha)
- Architectural style: Greek Revival, Queen Anne, Colonial Revival
- MPS: Clarke County MPS
- NRHP reference No.: 97001656
- Added to NRHP: January 23, 1998

The Jackson Historic District is a historic district in the city of Jackson, Alabama, United States. Jackson was founded in 1816 and is the oldest incorporated settlement in Clarke County. The historic district features examples of Greek Revival, Queen Anne, Colonial Revival, and regional vernacular architecture. Spread over 180 acres (73 ha) with 140 contributing buildings, it is roughly bounded by College Avenue, Forest Avenue, Carroll Avenue, Cedar Street, Florida Street, Commerce Street, Clinton Street, and Spruce Street. It is a part of the Clarke County Multiple Property Submission and was placed on the National Register of Historic Places on January 23, 1998.
