= Bauserman Farm =

- U.S. National Register of Historic Places
- Virginia Landmarks Register
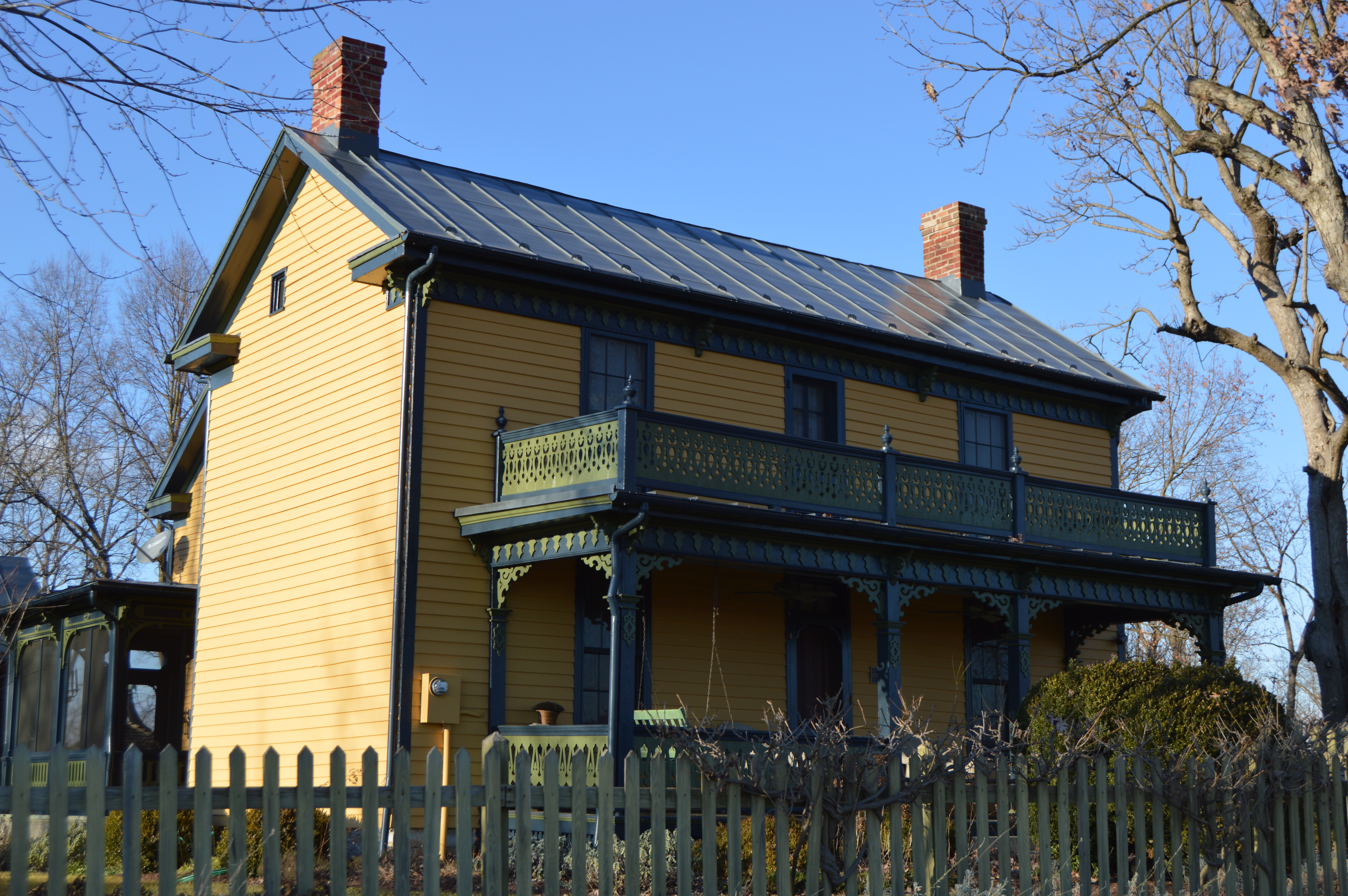
- Front and southwestern side of the farmhouse

- Location within Virginia Location within the United States
- Location: 10107 South Middle Road, near Mount Jackson, Virginia
- Coordinates: 38°46′43.5″N 78°39′4″W
- Area: 76 acres (31 ha)
- Built: c. 1800
- Architectural style: Victorian
- NRHP reference No.: 10001064
- VLR No.: 085-5172

Significant dates
- Added to NRHP: December 27, 2010
- Designated VLR: September 30, 2010

Bauserman Farm, also known as Kagey-Bauserman Farm, is a historic farmstead located near Mount Jackson, Shenandoah County, Virginia. The main house was built about 1860, and is a two-story, three-bay, gable-roofed, balloon-framed “I-house.” It has an integral rear ell, wide front porch and handsome late-Victorian scroll-sawn wood decoration. Also on the property are the contributing chicken house (early 1800s), a privy (early 1800s), a two-story summer kitchen (ca. 1823), a frame granary (ca. 1893), a large bank barn (ca. 1893), a chicken house (ca. 1940), the foundation of the former circular icehouse (early-19th century) and the foundation of a former one-room log cabin (early 1800s).

It was listed on the National Register of Historic Places in 2010.
