= Fort Valley (Virginia) =

Mountain valley in Shenandoah County, Virginia, USA

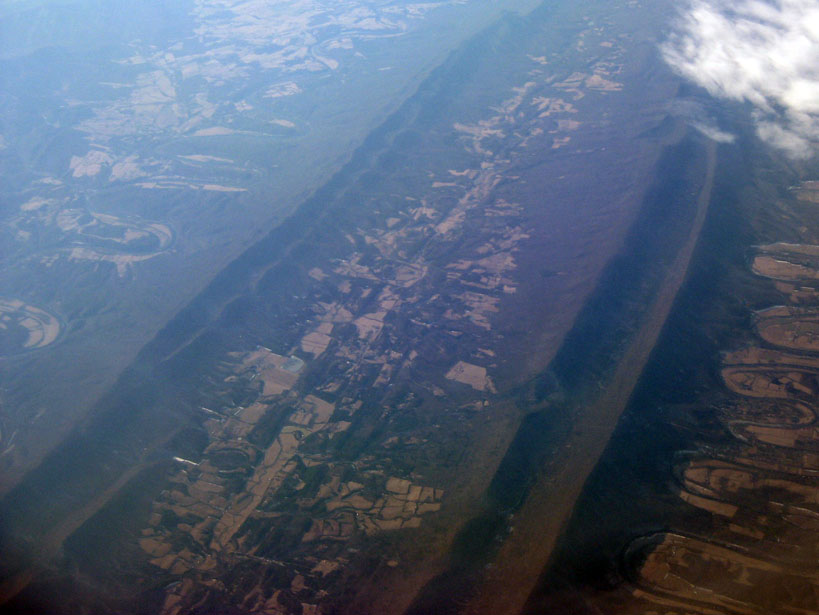
- Air photo of Fort Valley, facing south, with the North (right) and South (left) Forks of the Shenandoah River visible. February 2009.
- Length: 23 miles (37 km) North to south

Geography
- Location: Shenandoah County, Virginia
- Borders on: Massanutten Mountain (all sides)
- Coordinates: 38.800°N 78.461°W
- Traversed by: S.R. 678
- Interactive map of Fort Valley

Fort Valley is a mountain valley located primarily in Shenandoah County, Virginia. It is often called "valley within a valley" as it lies between the two arms of the northern part of the Blue Ridge Mountain range in the Shenandoah Valley in the Ridge-and-Valley Appalachians geological zone.

== Overview ==
The eastern ridgeline of Fort Valley is named Massanutten Mountain and is continuous for the eastern length of Fort Valley, with a short stretch called Waterfall Mountain in the extreme south of the valley. The western ridgeline of the valley, also part of the greater Massanutten range, is composed primarily of three named mountains, from north to south: Three Top Mountain, Powell Mountain and Short Mountain. Additionally, behind Three Top and Powell mountains another ridgeline in the chain is called Green Mountain, which is actually higher in elevation than the 3 westernmost named mountains and between which is a smaller highland valley, called Little Fort Valley. The far southern end of Fort Valley also contains a small highland sub-valley called Crisman Hollow, between Catback and Kerns mountains. Duncan's Knob at 2,800 feet, on Catback Mountain, and Strickler's Knob at over 2,700 feet on Masanutten Mountain are the two highest points in the Fort Valley ridgeline. In addition, there are several other named smaller mountains, knobs or notches within the ridges of Fort Valley, and several minor gaps or lower points between the mountains accessible only by hiking trails.

Fort Valley is almost entirely enclosed. At its southern end it is enclosed with an access point named Moreland Gap, and to the north it is constricted and nearly closed but for where Passage Creek flows through a narrow gap providing passage towards Front Royal. Passage Creek also is a prominent element of Fort Valley, running the entire length of the valley at its center, starting in Crisman Hollow in the mountain in the southernmost valley and flowing north, fed by other streams and runs, until it exits Fort Valley just past Elizabeth Furnace. The valley opens out toward the center, becoming about three miles (4.8 km) wide at its widest. The extreme southern end of the valley, the highlands of Crisman Hollow, is in Page County. The remainder of Fort Valley is in Shenandoah County, with the border of Shenandoah and Page Counties being along the eastern ridgeline of Masanutten Mountain. In all, Fort Valley is 23 miles (37 km) long.

Fort Valley is entirely rural, consisting mostly of private farmland, surrounded by the George Washington National Forest (GWNF), which covers the slopes and ridges on both the east and west mountains, offering many outdoor recreation opportunities. The population of Fort Valley is 1,259 with a land area of approximately 70 square miles. The Elizabeth Furnace and Camp Roosevelt Recreation Area of the GWNF are located within Fort Valley.

== Geology ==
The Fort Valley and Massanutten mountain range is the result of the Alleghanian Orogeny, the geologic process where a continental plate crumples and is pushed upwards to form mountain ranges. The Fort Valley is an enclosed synclinorium, a downward fold within the Massanutten range. Differential weathering produced the mountain/valley pattern within the Appalachian Ridge and Valley province to which Fort Valley, the Massanutten range and the adjacent Shenandoah and Page Valleys of Virginia belong. The valleys are limestones and flysch (shale + graywacke), susceptible to erosion. Over millennia, the Fort Valley was etched away due to low resistance of its limestone, while the mountain ridges of the Massanutten range are a tough quartz sandstone (Massanutten Sandstone, correlative to the Tuscarora Sandstone further to the west in the Ridge and Valley region) more resistant to that erosion. Thus, the geologic floor of Fort Valley is primarily limestone, with flysch shale, siltstone and some bentonite. A defining feature of the Fort Valley is Passage Creek, now a small stream at the center of the valley but a remnant of a larger water force that carved out the Fort Valley as it appears today.

== Hiking Trails and Recreation Areas ==
The Tuscarora trail, a 252-mile long distance hiking trail that passes through Virginia, West Virginia, Maryland, Pennsylvania, proceeds along the northeast ridgeline of Fort Valley, entering from just above Shenandoah State Park on the eastern ridgeline of Massanutten Mountain. The hiking trail passes through the Elizabeth Furnace Recreation Area, ascends Green Mountain and exits on Doll's Ridge on the western slope of Three Top Mountain as it descends towards the Tom's Brook Battlefield in the Shenandoah Valley.

The Massanutten Trail circumnavigates the entire ridgeline of the Fort Valley, 71 miles in total. It was built by the Potomac Appalachian Trail Club (PATC), completed in 2001. Prior to 2001, different portions of the trail had been known by different names and blazed in different colors. With the completion of the missing links, the Forest Service renamed the combined trails as the Massanutten Trail and provided orange blazes along the trail's entire length around Fort Valley.

The Woodstock Tower, built in 1935 by the Civilian Conservation Corps, is located on Powell Mountain, perched at 2,000 feet above Woodstock in the west and the floor of Fort Valley below to the east. Woodstock Tower is accessed via State Route 758 (Woodstock Tower Road), a gravel road with several challenging switchback turns on the western slope, or via hiking the Massanutten Trail which passes directly by the tower. The tower is a sightseeing attraction closely associated with Fort Valley, providing sweeping panoramic views of Shenandoah Valley and the seven bends of the North Fork of the Shenandoah River in the west, and the other Massanutten ridges and Page Valley to the east.

Fort Valley features two developed U.S. Forest Service recreation areas, Elizabeth Furnace Recreation Area toward the northern apex of the valley, and Camp Roosevelt Recreation Area at Edith Gap in the southeast end of the valley. Both recreation areas were built by the Civilian Conservation Corps in the 1930s. Camp Roosevelt features a hang gliding site nearby, a pavilion, camp sites and access to the Masanutten Trail. Elizabeth Furnace Recreation Area features a pavilion and multiple camping areas, interpretive trails related the historical iron industry at the site, and access to the Masanutten and Tuscarora trails which share a length of trail leading to Elizabeth Furnace from the east and separate at Elizabeth Furnace north (Massanutten Trail) and west (Tuscarora Trail.)

Not far from Elizabeth Furnace and within the George Washington Forest are two notable and frequented swimming or wading holes within Passage Creek, one named Blue Hole and one named Buzzards Rock Hole (or Red Hole). These wading holes are not official or supervised and swimming in these natural areas is at one's own risk.

The Little Fort Recreation Area off of Route 758, just down Powell Mountain from the Woodstock Tower and within the Little Fort Valley area between Powell and Green Mountain, has 10 established camp sites. It is often used by campers utilizing the nearby ATV and 4-wheel drive recreational access provided by the Forest Service, Peter's Mill Run Road, which runs through the Little Fort Valley.

Forest Road 274, Crisman's Hollow Road in the Page County southern end of Fort Valley, is a popular but not crowded spot for primitive roadside camping in the George Washington National Forest, with access to several trails leading to Kerns, Catback and Middle mountains and the Massanutten Trail.

== Special Biological Areas ==
The ridges of Fort Valley administered by the U.S. Forest Service contain several Special Biological Areas (SBA). These include Mudhole Gap SBA in the northern end of the Little Fort Valley; Peters Mill Run Bog SBA in the upper reaches of the Little Fort Valley area just south of Woodstock Tower; Signal Knob SBA and the Edinburg Gap Shale Barrens SBA, two of the easternmost Appalachian shale barrens; and Scothorn Gap SBA, a 34-acre forest plan-designated Special Biological Area in the southernmost edge of Masanutten Mountain. Waterfall Mountain Cliffs, in the southern extremity of the Fort Valley's Masanutten Mountain ridgeline just south of Scothorn Gap, has been recommended by Virginia Division of Natural Heritage to be designated as a Special Biological Area as it contains significant amounts of semi-primitive acreage.

== History ==
Fort Valley was a native American hunting ground. The name Massanutten is said to mean "Indian Basket," the Fort Valley being contained and perhaps shaped like an Indian basket and certainly abounding in wild game in early times. While no permanent settlements were located there, Indian relics have been found on several temporary village sites. In 1740s Massanutten Mountain was called Peaked Mountain, and later it was known as Buffalo Mountain. George Washington surveyed Fort Valley for Lord Fairfax in 1748.

Prior to Washington's survey, a first settler named Powell, reputed to be a fugitive from the law, took refuge in the valley in the northwestern mountain. Likely because it was not easily accessible in the colonial era, the area was then called Powell's Fort Mountain or Powell's Fort Valley, and later just "The Fort." The area Powell inhabited is now known as Powell's Mountain, and Fort Valley. Powell is said to have found silver or gold in the area. About 1733, three frontier hunters settled in "The Fort" and others soon followed.

According to tradition, Daniel Morgan built the first road into Fort Valley at the order of George Washington, with a view to holing up in this naturally fortified valley as a possible winter retreat had the Continental Army been defeated by the British during the American Revolution. Washington had spent extensive time surveying the valley in his earlier life, and likely had been impressed by the natural defenses offered by the mountain-contained valley. Thirty years later, after a hard winter at Valley Forge, Washington stated that if the war did not turn in their favor by the next winter, rather than surrender the Army would move south to the Shenandoah and make a stand in "The Fort." About this time Morgan reportedly began building a road into the valley, but when the Continental armies had success work stopped. Primary access would have been through a high pass now called Sherman's Gap along rough road partially constructed by Morgan; the route became known as Morgan's Road. Portions of the road are still visible and accessible by a hiking trail near Sherman's Gap, but in lower elevations the route is lost and unknown. In any case, the Continental Army's victory at Yorktown made Washington's theoretical plans unnecessary. Why Morgan would have built a military road over a nearly 2,000 foot minor gap as opposed an easier route along the water line of Passage Creek is unclear, leading some to believe the story is apocryphal.

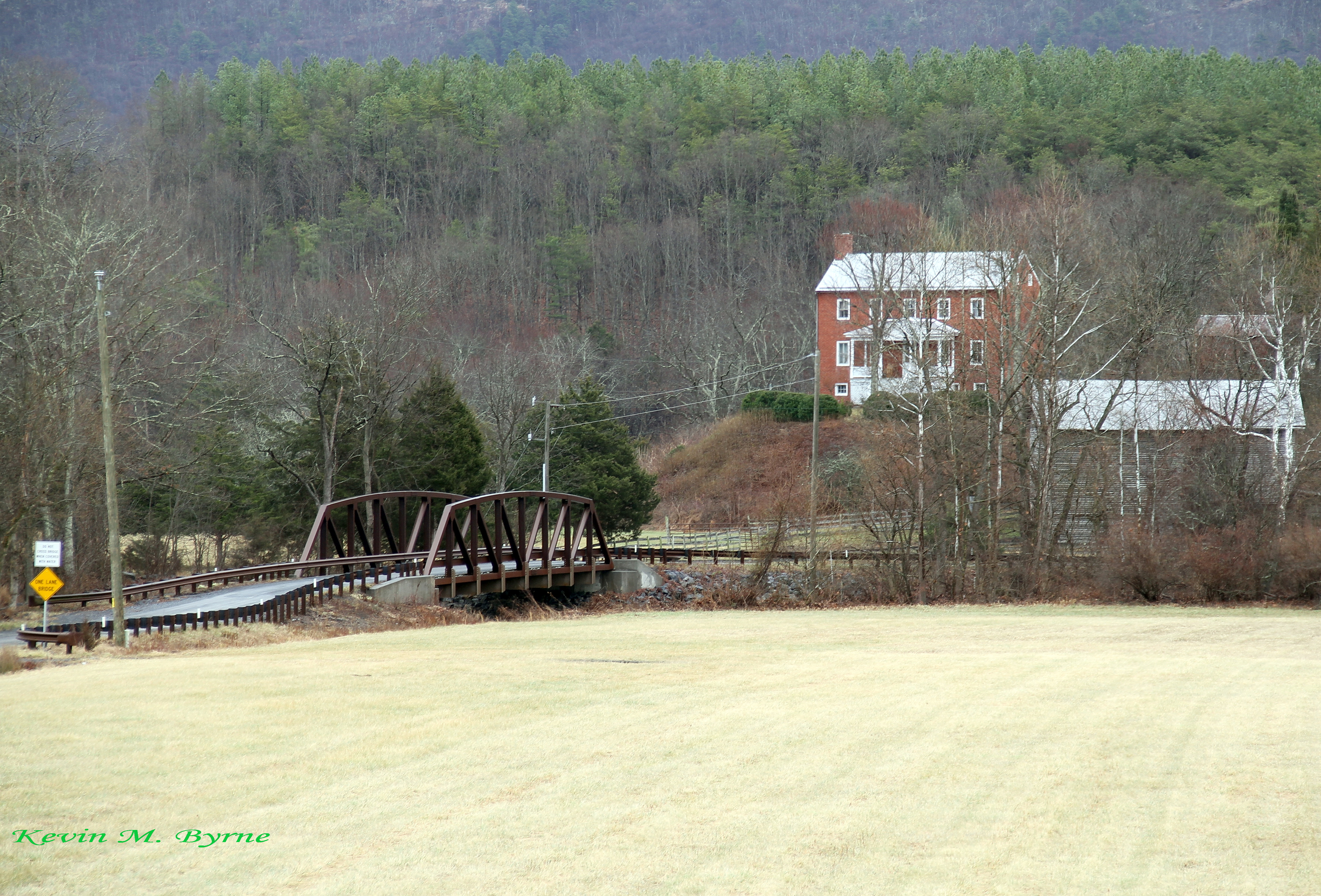
The Munch House, one of the oldest structures in Fort Valley, built by an early German settler family which prospered in the valley. Photo 1-11- 2014

The Daniel Munch House, a historic home and farm built in 1834 overlooking Passage Creek in Fort Valley, was listed on the National Register of Historic Places in 2002. Daniel Munch was a successful farmer and distiller, the son of early German settlers who moved to Fort Valley in 1779. The house has excellent examples of architectural details in the German tradition of northern Shenandoah Valley. It was the only brick house in Fort Valley as late as 1937.

With abundant deposits of limonite iron ore, called Oriskany ore (considered premium grade at the time), along with limestone for the iron-making process and timber for fuel, Fort Valley supported an active iron industry early in its settled history. Blast furnaces fueled by charcoal processed purified molten iron into forms or "pigs" which were hammered into bars and sent to foundries.

Elizabeth Furnace was a significant blast furnace in the Shenandoah Valley that created pig iron from 1836 – 1888, using Passage Creek for water power. The pig iron was transported over Massanutten Mountain to the South Fork of the Shenandoah River where it was transported for forging in Harpers Ferry, Virginia (later West Virginia.) The road used to transport the iron is in use today as a hiking trail. At one time, Elizabeth Furnace supported a community associated with the local iron industry. Elizabeth Furnace was destroyed by Union troops in October 1864 during operations associated with the Battle of Cedar Creek. The furnace reopened in 1883 but lacked sufficient output to be competitive with new mines in the midwest, and was abandoned in 1888. The Elizabeth Furnace Cabin is one of the few wooden buildings remaining from the early 1800s when Elizabeth Furnace was active. In 1936 the Civilian Conservation Corps constructed the Elizabeth Furnace Recreation Area on the site.

Further to the south of Fort Valley, another pig iron furnace called Caroline Furnace was established around 1835. There were 35 buildings with about 120 workers at the height of times for Caroline Furnace, which produced pig iron for railroads. During the Civil War, both Elizabeth and Caroline furnaces produced pig iron for the Confederacy, transported to Richmond for production at the Tredegar Iron Works. Caroline Furnace was also destroyed by Union troops in 1864, part of Sheridan's 1864 campaign to destroy all of military value to the Confederacy — agriculture and industry — in the Shenandoah Valley region. But unlike Elizabeth Furnace, Caroline Furnace was never rebuilt. The former grounds of Caroline Furnace now host a Lutheran camp and retreat center.

Signal Knob, a 2,111-foot barren promontory at the extreme northern ridgeline of Fort Valley offering panoramic views of the Shenandoah Valley northeast and west, was utilized during the Civil War as an important Confederate military observation and signal post. In skirmishing over control of Signal Knob, several Confederate soldiers were killed. One still lies buried there and his grave that inspired the poem, "The Georgia Volunteer." From Signal Knob the areas around Shenandoah Valley battlefields of Cedar Creek, Fisher's Hill and Tom's Brook can be observed. Signal Knob is accessed by an 11.5-mile round-trip hike from Elizabeth Furnace. Otherwise, during the Civil War no battle was fought in the isolated and contained Fort Valley, but General John Imboden's Confederate cavalry camped there at times.
