= Smith Creek (Virginia) =

Coordinates: 38.614188°N 78.670542°W

Location
- Country: United States
- State: Virginia
- Region: Shenandoah Valley
- Municipality: Rockingham County, Shenandoah County

Smith Creek (also known as Smith's Creek) is a 35.5-mile-long (57.1 km) tributary stream of the North Fork of the Shenandoah River in the Shenandoah Valley of Virginia. Its watershed comprises 106 square miles (270 km^{2}) within Shenandoah and Rockingham counties on the western slope of the Massanutten Mountain ridge. Its headwaters lie in Rockingham County just north of Harrisonburg, and its confluence with the North Fork of the Shenandoah River is located just south of Mount Jackson.

Smith Creek's major tributaries include:

- Mountain Run, which runs from the west slope of the Massanutten Mountain
  - Fridley Run, a tributary of Mountain Run
- Dry Fork, which rises just east of Harrisonburg, joining Smith Creek just before Lacey Spring
- Lacey Spring Branch, a short branch which runs from the limestone springs at Lacey Spring
- War Branch, which rises at the base of the Massanutten Mountain southwest of the community of Athlone and continues past the community of Arkton before joining Smith Creek near Moores Mill Road
- Gap Branch, which rises at the base of the Massanutten near New Market Gap and joins Smith Creak just prior to the North Fork of the Shenandoah River.

== Smith Creek restoration project ==
Smith Creek has been the beneficiary of a large-scale stream restoration project to revitalize the stream to a point where the native trout species can again thrive. Prior to the Civil War, trout up to 5 and 6 pounds were common in the stream, but as forested land was converted to pasture land for livestock the stream became unsuitable for fish. Restoration techniques include restricting livestock's access to the stream, which will reduce sediment and contamination from fecal bacteria, and planting grasses and trees along the banks, which will reduce erosion and sediment and reduce the stream's temperature by shading the water from the summer sun. By 2006, populations have already been reestablished in Mountain Run, and they have begun migrating downstream.

In 2010, the Smith Creek watershed was named Virginia's Chesapeake Showcase Watershed in recognition of the community's outstanding efforts to rejuvenate the creek's aquatic ecosystem. Fishermen continue to flock to the creek for its excellent fly fishing. By 2011, Smith Creek was home to brown trout over 24 inches (610 mm) and 7 pounds (3.2 kg), and rainbow trout over 5 pounds (2.3 kg) are not uncommon.

== See also ==
- List of rivers of Virginia
