= Elizabeth Furnace =

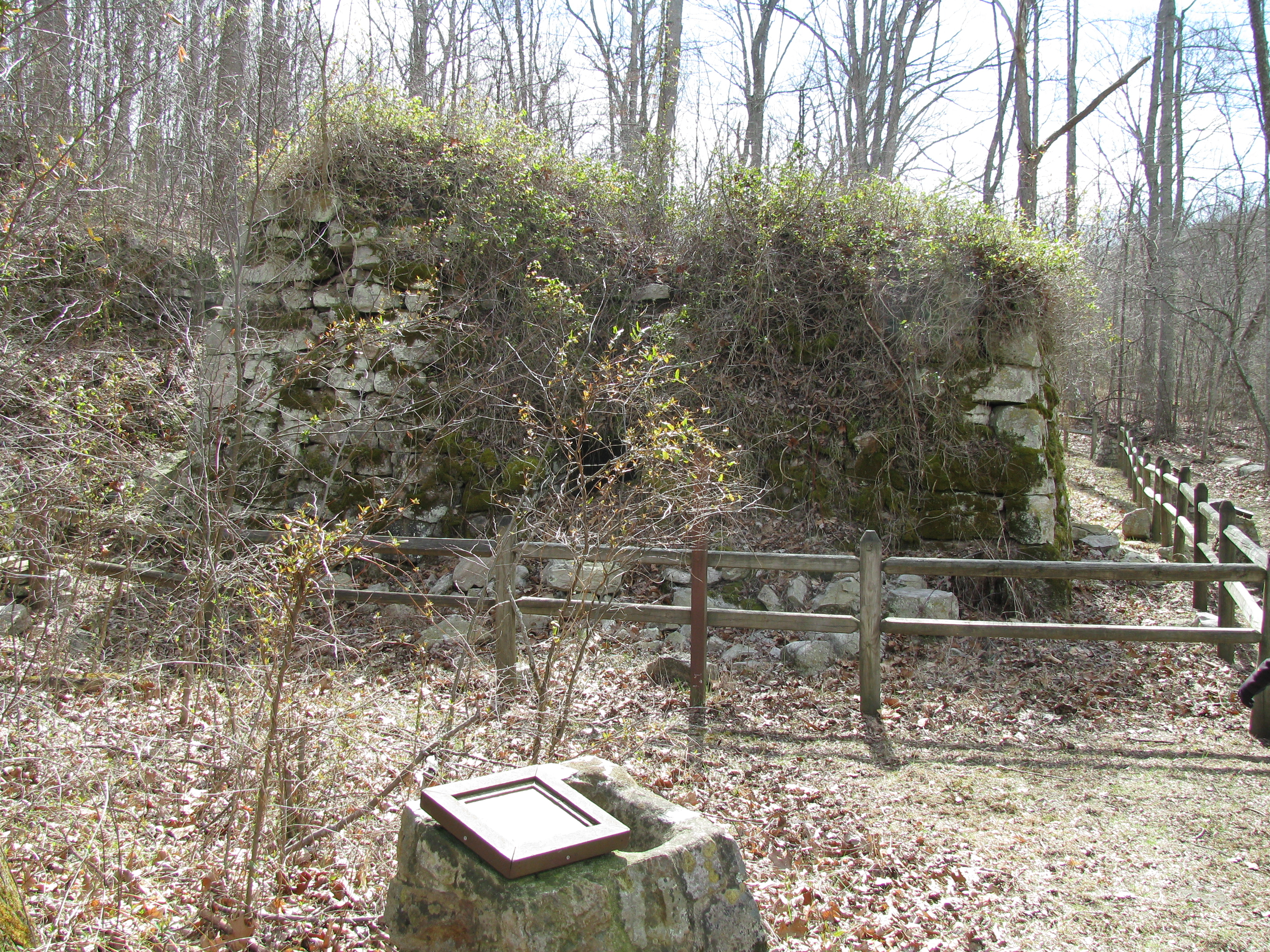
- Elizabeth Furnace in early spring

- Location within Virginia
- 38°55′53″N 78°19′23″W
- Location: Shenandoah Valley, Virginia

Virginia Landmarks Register
- Designated: March 17, 1999
- Reference no.: 085-0940

Elizabeth Furnace was a blast furnace in the Shenandoah Valley that was used to create pig iron from 1836 to 1888 using Passage Creek for water power. Iron ore was mined nearby, purified in the furnace, and then pig iron was transported over the Massanutten Mountain to the South Fork of the Shenandoah River for forging in Harpers Ferry, West Virginia. The road used to transport this iron is still used today by hikers climbing to the top of the Massanutten Mountain via the Massanutten Trail. Much of the original stone structure still exists, as well as a restored cabin, and an outdoor recreation area.

== Elizabeth Furnace Recreation Area ==
The Elizabeth Furnace Recreation Area, located in George Washington National Forest just north of Fort Valley, Virginia, consists of three main areas: the group camping area, the picnic area and the family camping area.

The group camping area, located at 38.932424°N 78.321168°W, includes fire rings and open pit toilets.

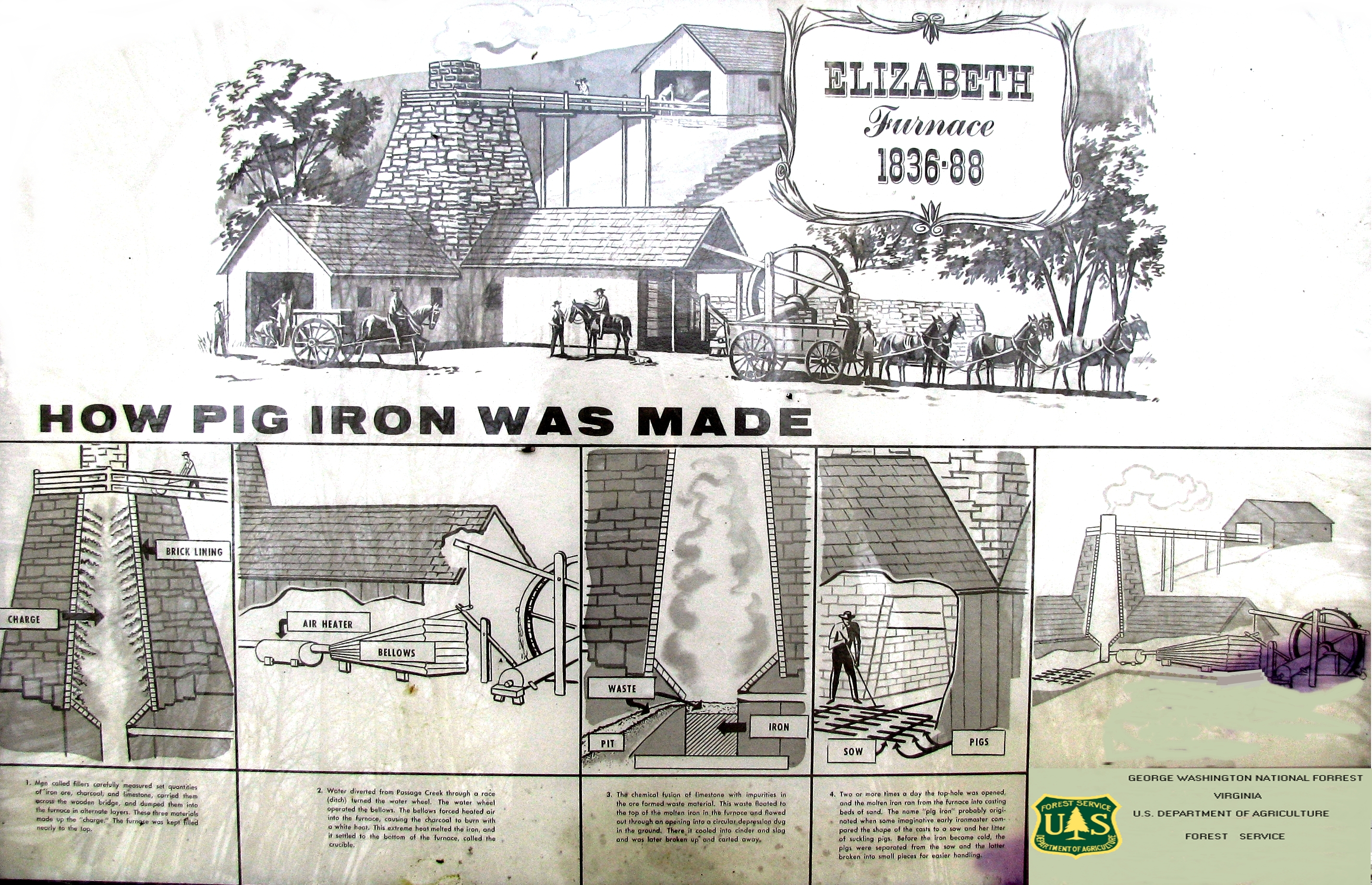
Description of how pig iron was made at Elizabeth Furnace

The picnic area, located at 38.929953°N 78.327906°W, includes picnic tables, open pit toilets, open fields, access to several well blazed and maintained hiking trails (most notably the Massanutten / Tuscarora Trail), mountain biking trails and fishing in Passage Creek. There is a trout hatchery near Passage Creek where a fishing license is required.

The family camping area, located at 38.924514°N 78.332201°W, includes 33 first-come, first-served pay camp sites, fire rings, and a restored 1830s cabin.
