= Cold Spring River =

Coordinates: 38.74095°N 79.03336°W

Location
- Country: United States

Physical characteristics
- Source
  - location: Virginia

The Cold Spring River is a 3.9-mile-long (6.3 km) mountain stream in Rockingham County in the U.S. state of Virginia. It is a tributary of the German River, the principal source of the North Fork Shenandoah River. Via the Shenandoah River, the Cold Spring River is part of the Potomac River watershed.

== See also ==
- List of rivers of Virginia
