= Goods Mill, Virginia =

Unincorporated community in Virginia, US

Coordinates: 38.77039°N 78.40473°W

Goods Mill is an unincorporated community in Page County, in the U.S. state of Virginia. It is located west of Rileyville along one of the bends of the Shenandoah River. Good Mill Road once crossed the Shenandoah River to connect to South Page Valley Road, but the bridge was washed away and not rebuilt.
