= Signal Knob =

Mountain in the U.S. state of Virginia

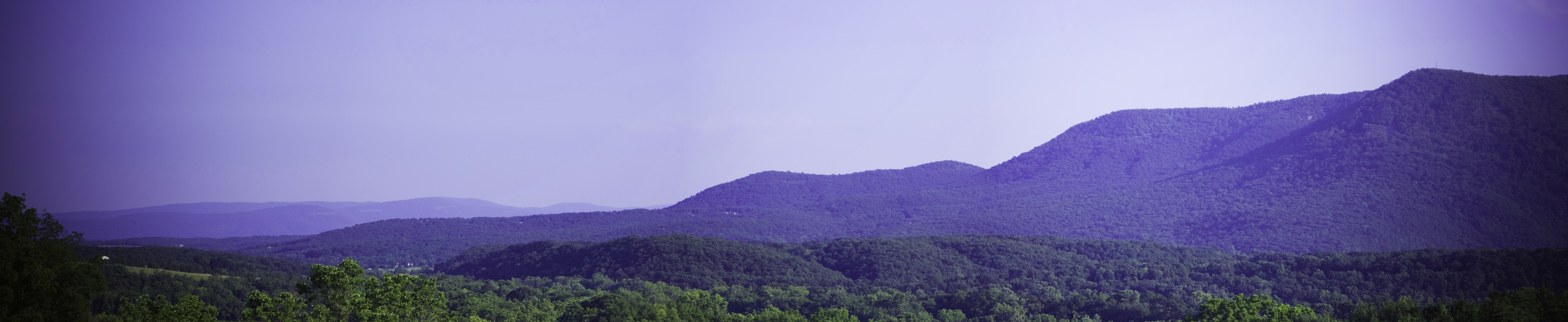
- A view of Signal Knob, from Strasburg, Virginia

Highest point
- Elevation: 2,106 ft (642 m)
- Coordinates: 38.96100°N 78.331°W

Geography
- Location: Shenandoah / Warren counties, Virginia, U.S.
- Parent range: Ridge and Valley Appalachians
- Topo map: USGS Strasburg Quad

Climbing
- Easiest route: Hike

Signal Knob is the northern peak of Massanutten Mountain in the Ridge and Valley Appalachians with an elevation of 2,106 feet (642 m). It is located in George Washington National Forest in Shenandoah County and Warren County in Virginia.

The peak offers expansive views into the northern Shenandoah Valley and the town of Strasburg, Virginia.

== History ==
Signal Knob was used by Signal Corps in the American Civil War by both the Union and Confederate armies. The Confederates occupied it from 1862 to 1864. From Signal Knob, the Confederate Signal Corps could monitor Union troop movements and observe battles from Winchester to Fisher's Hill and beyond. They could also communicate using flags, lanterns, and telescopes to other stations at Ashby Gap, Burnt Springs, Harmony Hollow, and New Market Gap.

On August 14, 1864, a group of Union troops temporarily won control of the peak by defeating a detachment of the 61st Georgia Volunteer Infantry but could not dislodge the Confederates and were forced to retreat back down the mountain. In October, 1864, Confederate Major General John Brown Gordon surveyed the Union position at Cedar Creek from Signal Knob and devised a plan for a surprise attack. Upon Gordon's return to Strasburg, Lieutenant General Jubal Early approved his plan. The Confederates successfully carried out the attack the morning of October 19, 1864 at the Battle of Cedar Creek, only to be defeated later that day by a Union counterattack. Remains of Civil War era fortifications can still be seen around the area.

In 2014 and 2019 on the 150th and 155th anniversaries of the Battle of Cedar Creek, rangers from the Cedar Creek and Belle Grove National Historical Park visited Signal Knob and shared with hikers the history of the mountain as well as descriptions of the Civil War reenactments happening in the valley below.

== Recreation ==
The Massanutten Trail, maintained by the Potomac Appalachian Trail Club, leads hikers and mountain bikers up to Signal Knob. There are many loop options of varying lengths which may be combined with the Tuscarora Trail. An unimproved service road that is normally closed to vehicular traffic but available for hiking also leads up to the radio tower now located a short distance from the historic overlook. Trails in the Signal Knob area are known to be less crowded than Shenandoah National Park, to the east.
