= Short Mountain =

Short Mountain is the name of 44 summits in the United States, including:

- Short Mountain (Connecticut)
- Short Mountain (Tennessee)
- Short Mountain (Virginia)
- Short Mountain (West Virginia)
