= Passage Creek =

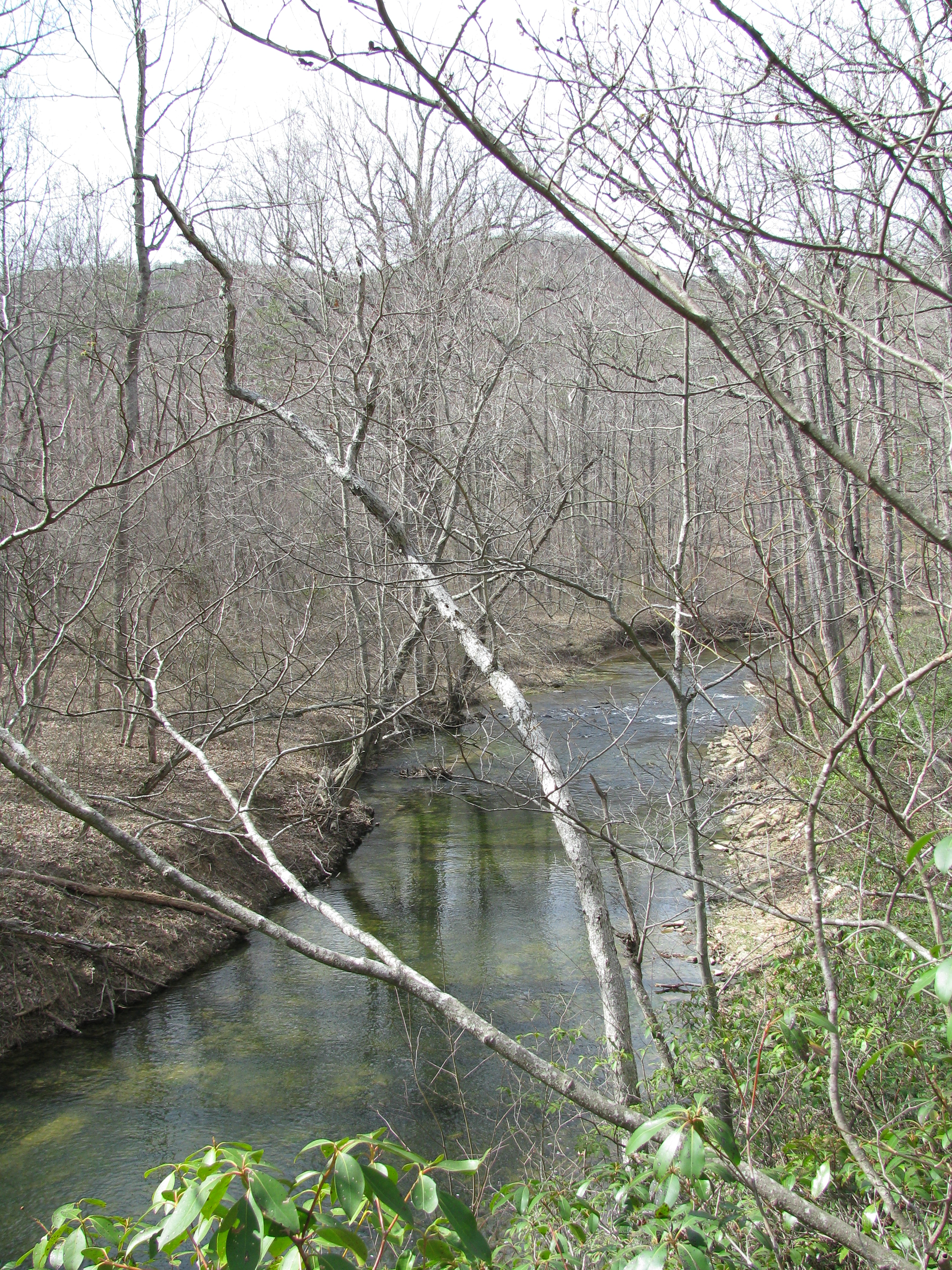
- Passage Creek in early spring

- Location of the mouth of the Passage Creek in Virginia Passage Creek (the United States)

Location
- Country: United States
- State: Virginia
- Counties: Shenandoah, Warren, Page

Physical characteristics
- Source
  - location: West of Luray, Page County
  - coordinates: 38°39′51″N 78°35′45″W
- Mouth: North Fork Shenandoah River
  - location: East of Strasburg, Warren County
  - coordinates: 38°58′36″N 78°16′12″W
- Length: 38.5 mi (62.0 km)

Passage Creek is a 38.5-mile-long (62.0 km) tributary stream of the North Fork Shenandoah River in Fort Valley, Virginia. For most of its length it flows through a rural valley between the two spine-like ridges of Massanutten Mountain, then exits the valley by cutting a narrow gorge through the northeast end of the mountain.

== Recreation ==
Passage Creek passes through the George Washington National Forest, managed by the United States Forest Service. It is annually stocked with trout by the Virginia Department of Game and Inland Fisheries. The stream runs along Fort Valley Road, and is accessible at the Elizabeth Furnace recreation area.

== See also ==
- List of rivers of Virginia
