= German River =

River in Virginia, United States

Coordinates: 38°46′04″N 78°56′26″W

The German River is the principal tributary of the North Fork of the Shenandoah River, flowing for 14.7 miles (23.7 km) in the U.S. state of Virginia. The river originates in northern Rockingham County, just east of the West Virginia border, in the George Washington National Forest, near the crest of Shenandoah Mountain in the Allegheny Mountains.

== Course ==
The German River rises from a mountain spring in the Cow Run area of Rockingham County, 10 miles (16 km) southwest of the town of Bergton. From an elevation of 3,400 feet (1,000 m) above sea level, it descends rapidly to the northeast between Fulk Mountain and Black Lick Mountain. The valley begins to widen and have some cultivation below 2,200 feet (670 m) above sea level. Tributaries of the German River (ordered from upstream to downstream) are Camp Rader Run, Beech Lick Run, Sumac Run, Paint Lick Run, the Cold Spring River, Persimmon Run, and Siever Run. Near Bergton, the German River joins Crab Run to form the North Fork of the Shenandoah River.

=== Tributaries ===
- Beech Lick Run
- Sumac Run
- Cold Spring River
- Persimmon Run
- Siever Run

== See also ==
- List of rivers of Virginia
