= Millville, West Virginia =

- Unincorporated community
- Location within West Virginia Location within the United States
- Coordinates: 39°17′38″N 77°47′9″W
- Country: United States
- State: West Virginia
- County: Jefferson
- Time zone: UTC-5 (Eastern (EST))
  - Summer (DST): UTC-4 (EDT)
- ZIP codes: 25432
- GNIS ID: 1555130

Millville is an unincorporated community on the Shenandoah River in Jefferson County, West Virginia, United States. According to the Geographic Names Information System, Millville has also been known as Keye's Switch, Keyes Switch and Milville.

== History ==
The community was named after the Millville Milling Company, the proprietors of a local gristmill.
