= Short Mountain (Virginia) =

Mountain in Virginia, United States of America

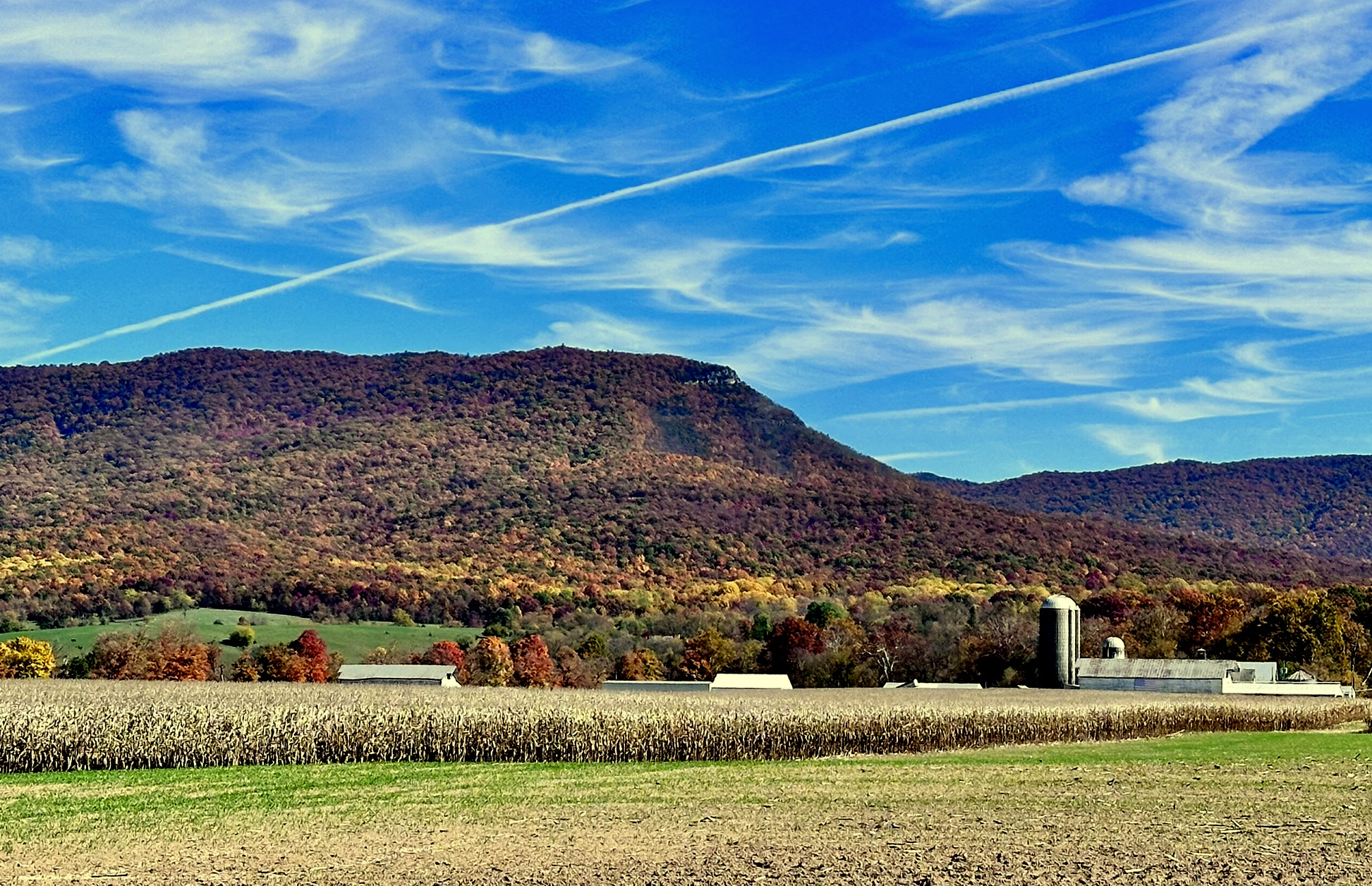
- Facing east towards "The Knob" at the southwest end of Short Mountain, October 2023

Highest point
- Elevation: 2,811 ft (857 m)
- Coordinates: 38°46′48″N 78°32′27″W

Geography
- Location: Shenandoah County, Virginia, U.S.
- Topo map: USGS Edinburg

Short Mountain lies along the northwestern margin of Massanutten Mountain in Shenandoah County, Virginia. It is seven miles in length, from Mount Jackson on the south end to Edinburg on the north, so it was also once known as "Seven-mile Mountain". The Massanutten Trail traverses the mountain.
