= Daniel Munch House =

Historic house in Virginia, United States

- U.S. National Register of Historic Places
- Virginia Landmarks Register
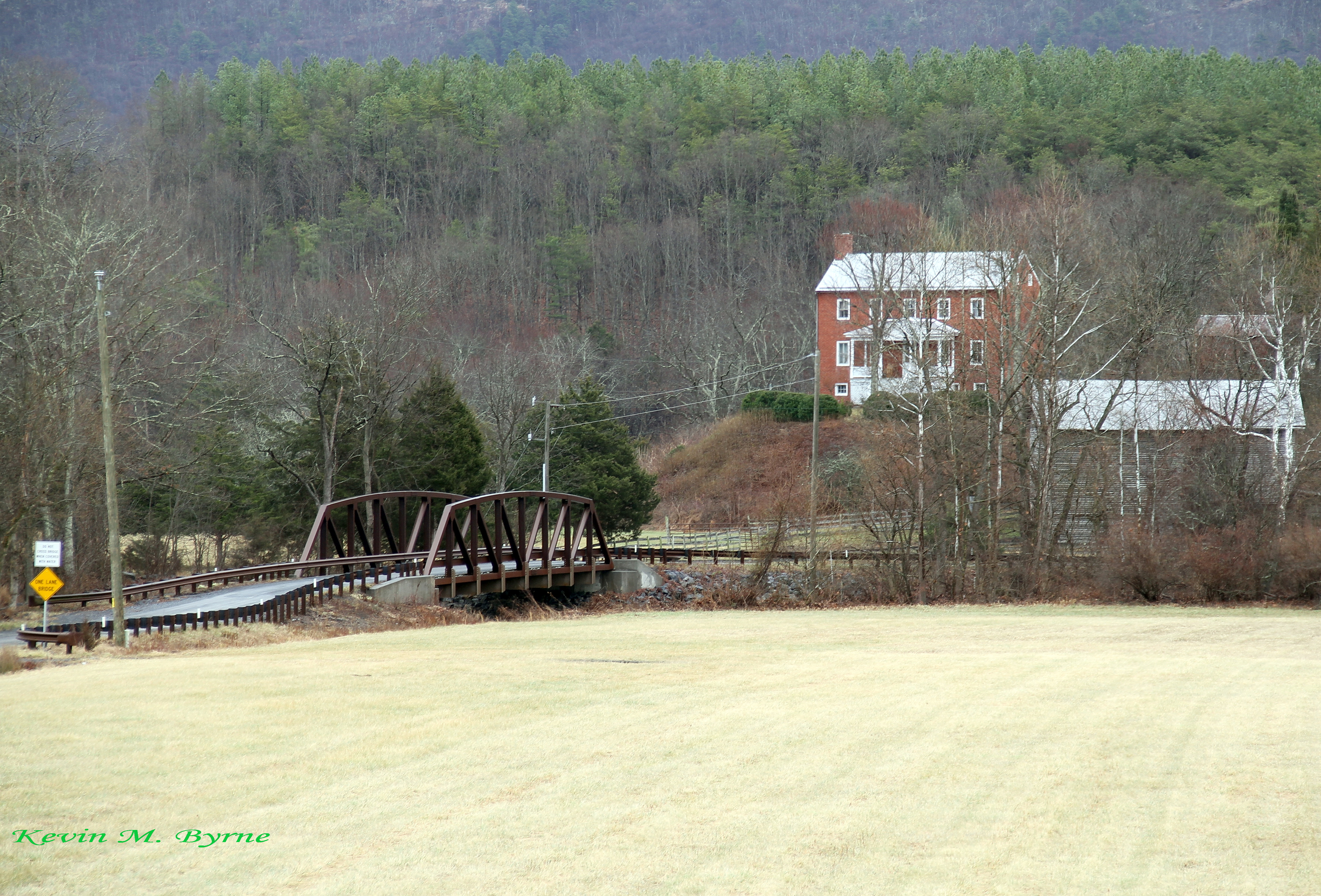

- Location within Virginia Location within the United States
- Location: 2588 Seven Fountains Rd., near Fort Valley, Virginia
- Coordinates: 38°51′17″N 78°24′02″W
- Area: 73 acres (30 ha)
- Built: 1834
- Architectural style: Federal
- NRHP reference No.: 02000181
- VLR No.: 085-0363

Significant dates
- Added to NRHP: March 13, 2002
- Designated VLR: December 5, 2001

Daniel Munch House is a historic home and farm located near Fort Valley, Shenandoah County, Virginia. It was built in 1834, and is a two-story, five-bay, brick I-house dwelling in a vernacular late-Federal style. It has a 1 1/2-story two-room brick rear ell, with a partially exposed basement and a wraparound porch. Also on the property are the contributing bank barn (c. 1929), frame tool shed, equipment or vehicle shed with attached corn crib, livestock shed, and the Ridenour family cemetery.

It was listed on the National Register of Historic Places in 2002.
