= Page Valley =

Valley in Virginia, US

Coordinates: 38°44′59″N 78°23′57″W

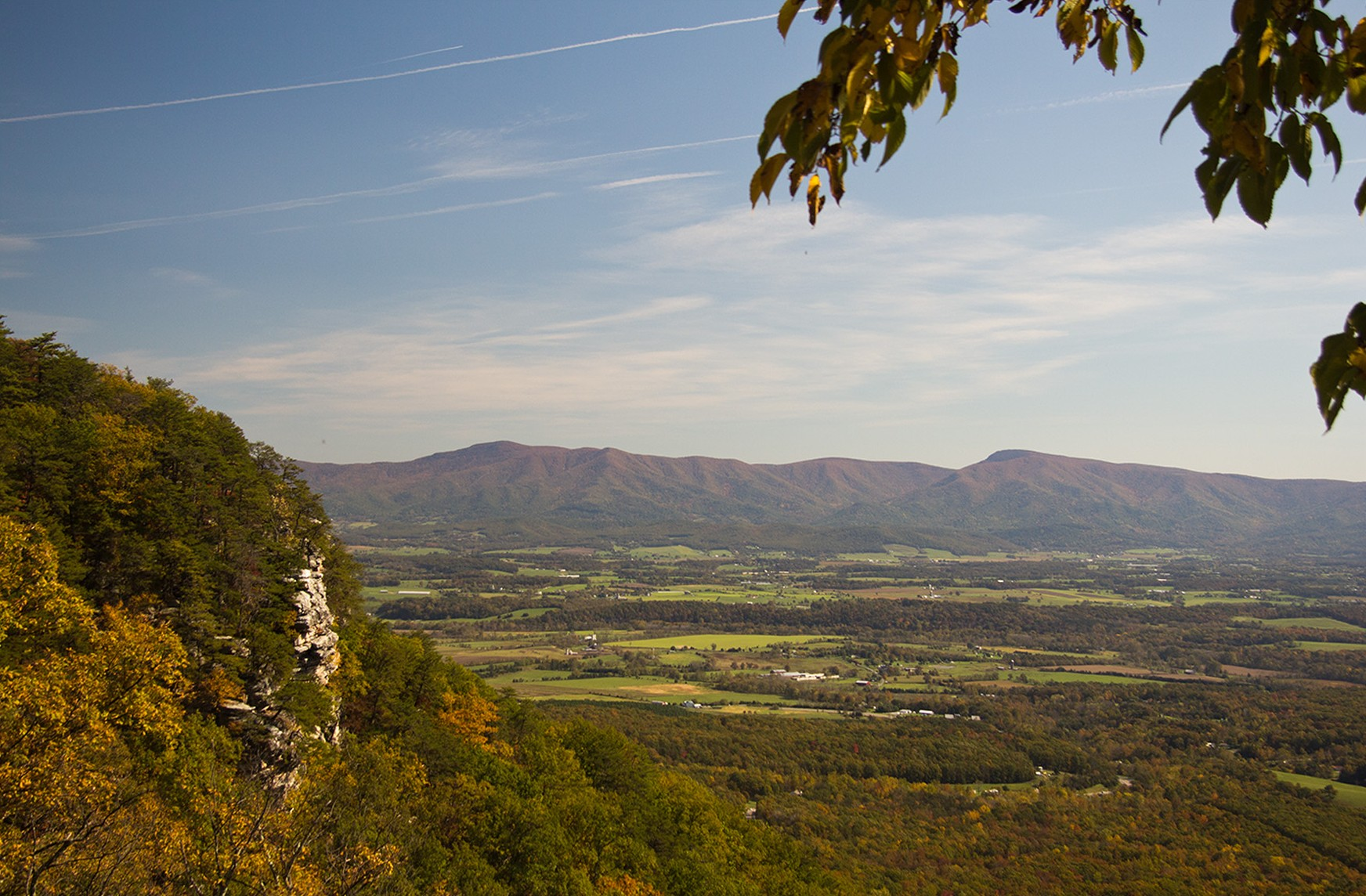
- Page Valley, Virginia
- Length: 45 miles (72 km) North to South
- Width: 10 miles (16 km)

Geography
- Location: Page County, Virginia
- Population centers: Luray
- Borders on: Blue Ridge Mountains (east); Massanutten Mountain (west)
- Traversed by: U.S. Route 211, U.S. Route 340
- Interactive map of Page Valley

The Page Valley is a small valley geographically and culturally associated with the Shenandoah Valley. The valley is located between the Massanutten and Blue Ridge mountain ranges in western Virginia.

== Geography ==
The valley is approximately 45 miles (72 km) long. At its widest, across from New Market Gap near Luray, the valley is about 10 miles (16 km) wide, while at its narrowest north of Luray near Compton, it is only 3.25 miles (5.23 km). To the south of Luray, at Ingham, the valley narrows to 3.5 miles (5.6 km) wide.

The valley primarily encompasses the Page County area and the southern portion of Warren County, near the northern terminus, a few miles south of Front Royal.

The south fork of the Shenandoah River flows around the western side of the Page Valley, along the eastern foot of Massanutten Mountain.

=== Transportation ===
U.S. Route 340 runs north–south through the valley, while U.S. Route 211 cuts east–west across the valley from Thornton Gap in the Blue Ridge, through Luray to New Market Gap in the Massanutten.

== History ==
During the American Civil War, it was known as the Luray Valley, since Luray, Virginia (the county seat of Page County) is located in the center of Page Valley. The valley played a significant role in Stonewall Jackson's strategy during his Valley Campaign of 1862 in which he defeated three numerically superior Union armies.
