= Massanutten Trail =

National Recreation Trail in George Washington National Forest

Coordinates: 38°56′5″N 78°19′13″W

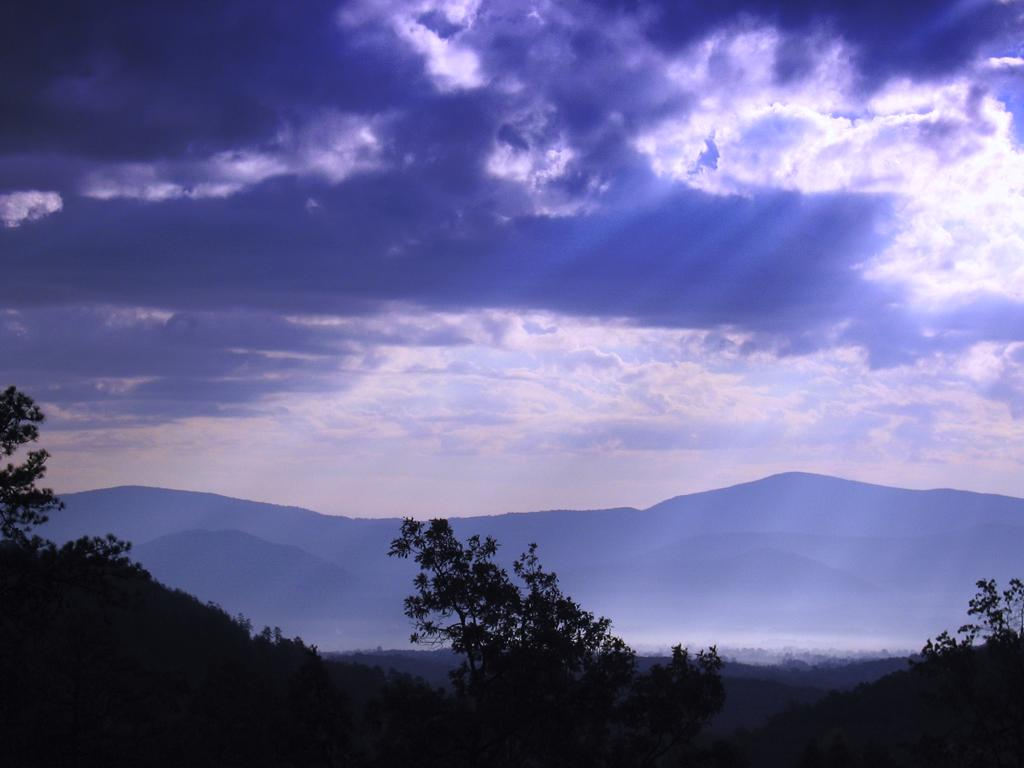
- View of Massanutten Mountain, which the Massanutten Trail traverses
- Length: 71 mi (114 km)
- Location: George Washington National Forest, Virginia, United States
- Use: Hiking, mountain biking, horseback riding
- Difficulty: Strenuous
- Sights: Appalachian Mountains

The Massanutten Trail is a 71-mile (114 km) National Recreation Trail located in George Washington National Forest in western Virginia, specifically the central Shenandoah Valley. Much of the path is steep and rugged terrain, and presents many mountain vistas. The trail traverses the Massanutten Range around its inner valley. Shenandoah National Park is to the east, and Great North Mountain is west.

== History ==
The trail has its origins in the American Revolutionary War. Originally known as Morgan's Road, a portion of the trail at Veach Gap was built as a potential avenue for retreat in case the Continental Army had been defeated at the battle of Yorktown. George Washington had Daniel Morgan construct the road over the eastern ridge into the valley.

In the 19th century, the area was used for mining and the production of charcoal. Elizabeth Furnace was a blast furnace utilized to create pig iron. Signal Knob, a peak on the northern end of the trail, was used by the Signal Corps of both armies in the Civil War.

In 1933, Camp Roosevelt, located on the eastern part of the trail, was established as the first Civilian Conservation Camp. In the latter half of the 20th century, there were many trails established in the Massanutten area. The Potomac Appalachian Trail Club had envisioned a long distance trail there since the 1960s, and in 2002 the Circuit Trail was completed.

== Animals and Plants ==
There are a variety of birds, reptiles and mammals in the area. White-tailed deer, gray squirrels, red and gray fox, rattlesnakes, black bears, ruffed grouse, wild turkey, and bobcats may be spotted by the hiker.

The trail also features many eastern wildflowers.

== Activities ==
The trail sees a variety of user activity, including hiking and backpacking. Since the trail is a circuit, it presents a good opportunity to thru-hike.

The trail is well marked by orange blazes and easy to follow. Challenges for the hiker include steep ascents and descents in elevation, rocky terrain, and few water supply points.

There are backcountry camp spots along the trail, and a primitive shelter in the Little Crease area. In addition, there are primitive campgrounds located near the trail, including the Elizabeth Furnace and Camp Roosevelt area.

Hikers should be aware that the area is popular with hunters in the fall and should exercise necessary caution.

Mountain biking and trail running are also popular activities on the Massanutten Trail. The Virginia Happy Trails Running Club holds the annual Massanutten Mountain Trails 100 Mile Run ultramarathon in the spring.

Other events that use the trail are the Old Dominion 100 Run ultramarathon, and the Old Dominion 100 Ride equestrian event.
