= New Market Gap =

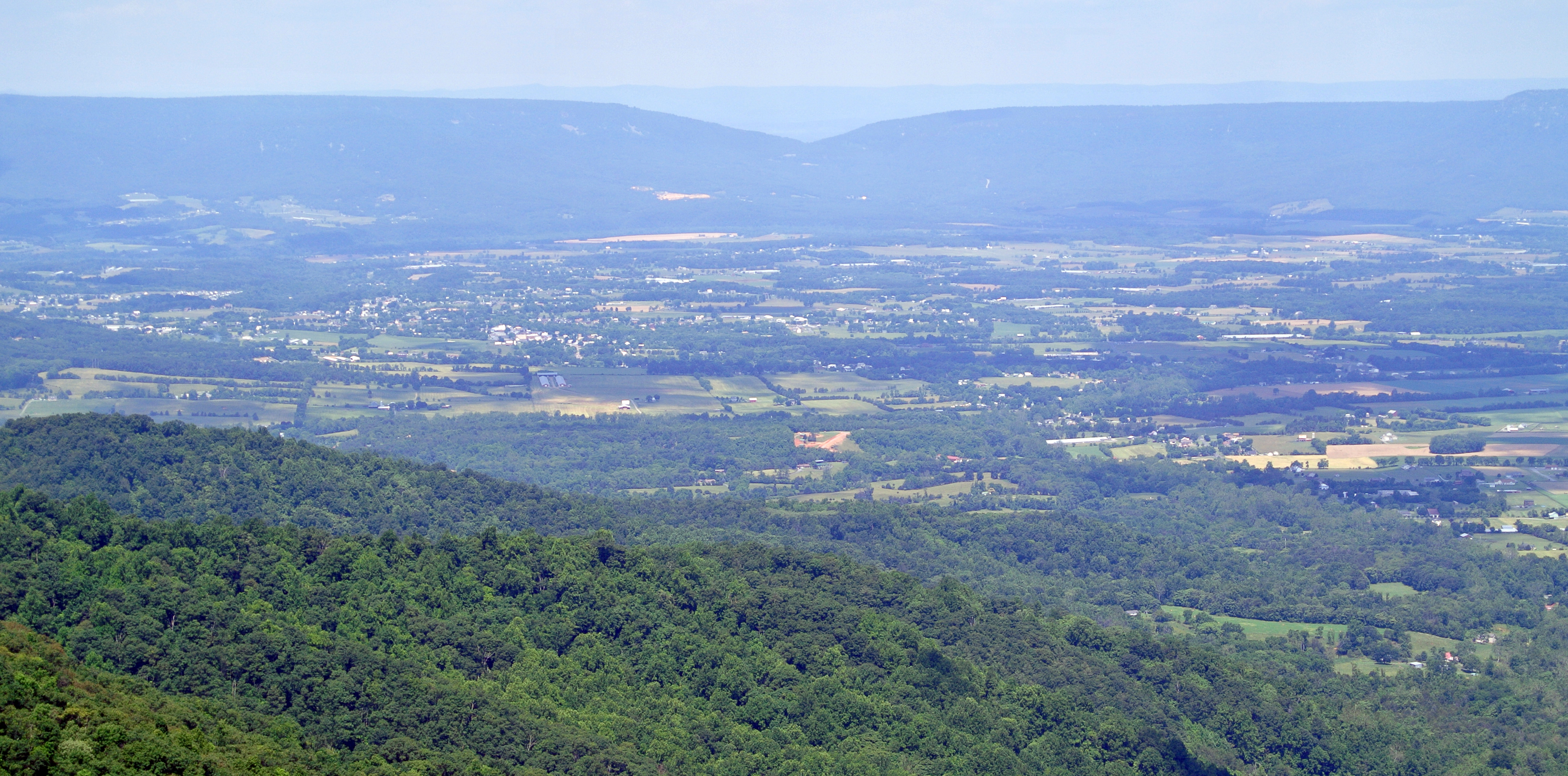
- View of New Market Gap from the Blue Ridge

- Location within Virginia
- Elevation: 1,808 feet (551 m)
- Traversed by: U.S. Route 211

Third Approach
- Location: Page County / Shenandoah County, Virginia, United States
- Range: Massanutten Mountain; Ridge and Valley Appalachians
- Coordinates: 38°38′34″N 78°36′44″W

New Market Gap is a wind gap in the Massanutten Mountain in Virginia. The 1,804 feet (550 m) gap is located approximately in the middle of the range, dividing it into north and south sections.

U.S. Route 211 runs through the gap, connecting New Market in the Shenandoah Valley with Luray in the Page Valley. The Massanutten Visitor Center of the George Washington National Forest is off Rt. 211 in the gap.
