= Massanutten Mountain =

Ridge in the Appalachians in Virginia, United States

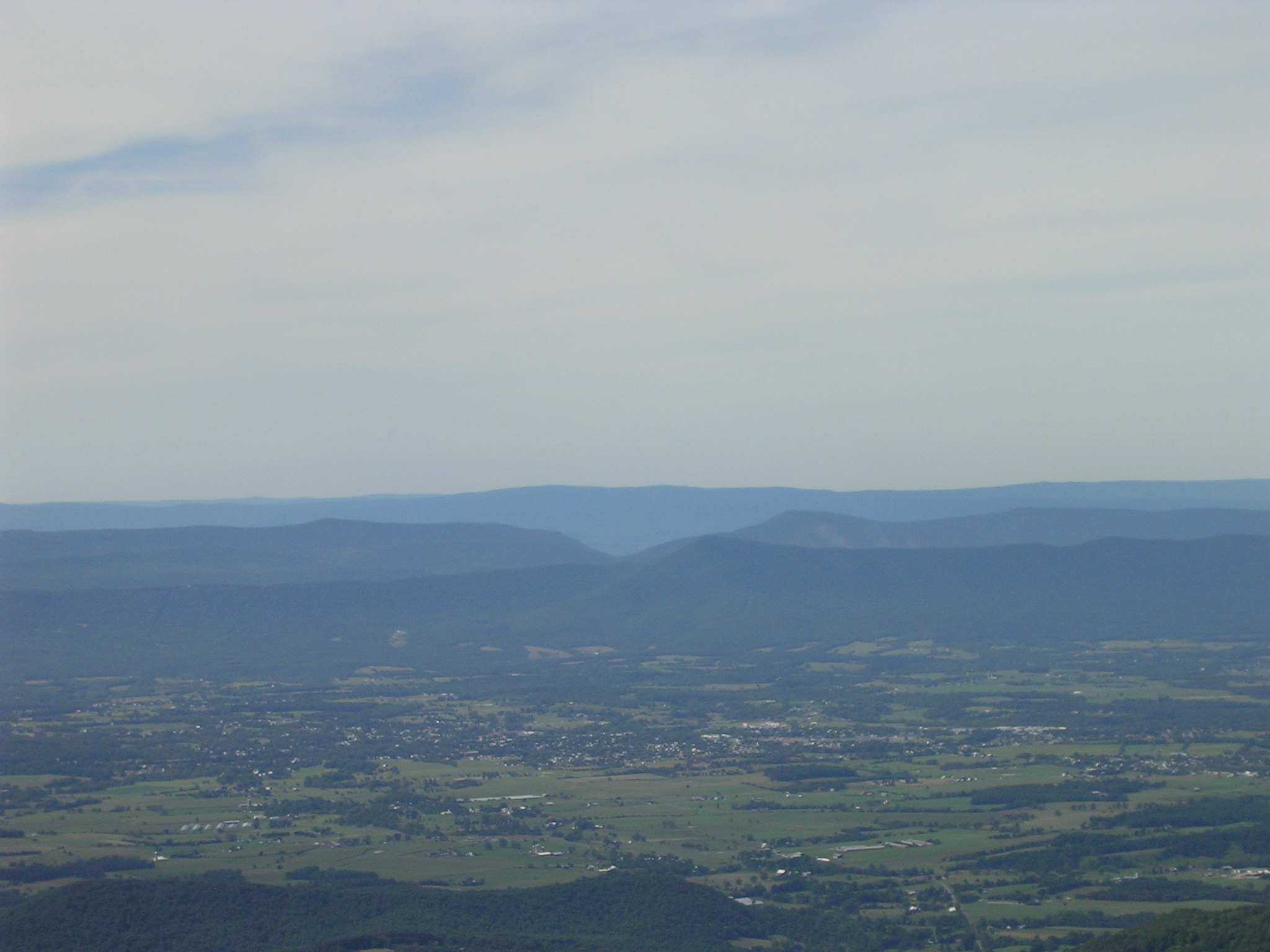
- View of Massanutten Mountain from the east, looking west from Hawksbill Peak, with Luray in the foreground and the Great North Mountain in the background. August 2007.

Highest point
- Elevation: 3,281 ft (1,000 m)1000m
- Coordinates: 38°38′34.9″N 78°36′43.3″W

Geography
- Location within Virginia
- Location: Virginia, U.S.
- Parent range: Ridge-and-Valley Appalachians

Geology
- Mountain type: Synclinal Ridge

Climbing
- Easiest route: Drive

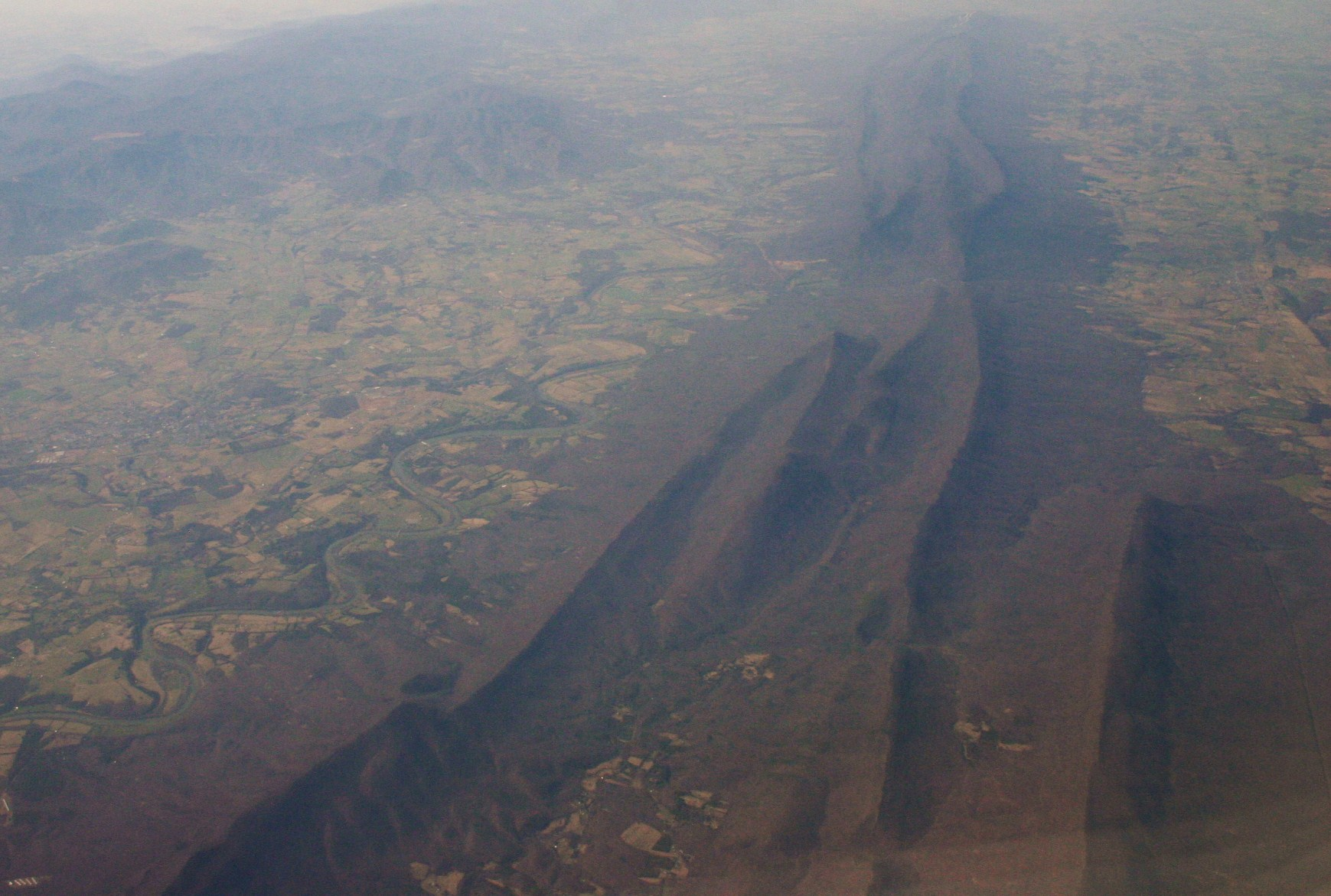
Oblique air photo of Massanutten Mountain, looking southwest. The south fork of the Shenandoah River is visible to the left, as well as a part of the Blue Ridge Mountains.

Massanutten Mountain is a synclinal ridge in the Ridge-and-Valley Appalachians, located in the U.S. state of Virginia. The original Native American name for the ridge is unknown. The mountain was known as "Peaked Mountain" in 1740, and later as Buffalo Mountain.

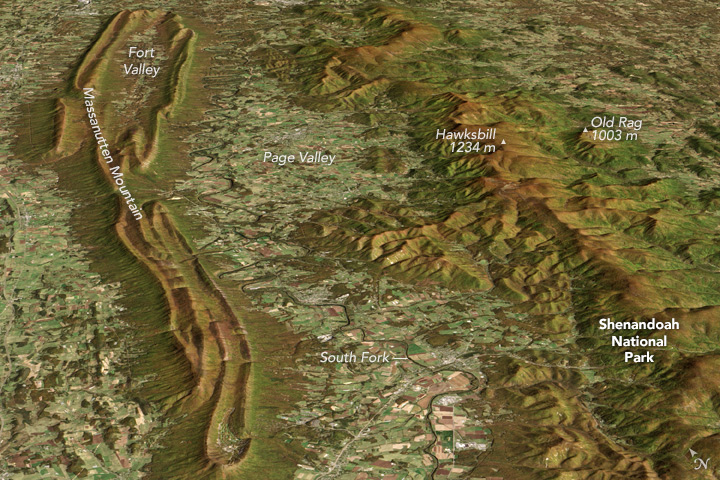
Image displaying the topographical differences between two roughly parallel ridges along Virginia's western border: one is the backbone of Shenandoah National Park (right), and the other is Massanutten Mountain (middle/left). Both rise above the Shenandoah Valley's rolling lowlands, with Massanutten dividing the valley roughly in half.

== Geography ==
The mountain bisects the Shenandoah Valley just east of Strasburg in Shenandoah County in the north, to Massanutten Peak east of Harrisonburg in Rockingham County in the south. The highest point along the entire 50-mile-long ridge is the 3281-foot high Lairds Knob, located about two miles north of Massanutten Peak.

The mountain is divided into northern and southern sections, divided by the New Market Gap. The northern section consists of 3 roughly parallel ridges, forming 2 valleys. The wider, main valley, is called Fort Valley, while the smaller one is known as Little Fort Valley. The ridges of the northern section converge at New Market Gap. The southern section consists of a series of closely gathered ridges, separated by precipitous creek gorges.

On the eastern side of the mountain range lie the Page Valley and the Blue Ridge Mountains. On the western side lie the North-Central Shenandoah Valley and the Great North Mountain of the Alleghany Mountains.

== Recreation ==
Most of the range is part of the Lee Ranger District of the George Washington National Forest and contains the Elizabeth Furnace and Camp Roosevelt recreational areas. The Potomac Appalachian Trail Club maintains the Massanutten Trail as well as several other hiking trails in the forest. Signal Knob, a former Civil War signal station on the northern peak of the mountain, is a popular destination. The forest service also maintains several ATV trails.

In 1973, the Massanutten Mountain ski lodge and four-season resort village was established near the southern peak. The private resort has nearly doubled in size since Great Eastern Resorts bought it in 1995.

== Flora and fauna ==
Wildlife on Massanutten includes black bear, coyotes, wild turkeys, white-tailed deer, timber rattlesnake, and luna moths. Significant flora includes mayapple, bluets, wild lupine, cardinal flower, and pinxter flower.

== Geology ==
The geology of the Massanutten Mountains is dominated by Silurian Massanutten Sandstone, a lateral equivalent of the Tuscarora Formation in the Appalachian Mountains to the west, overlying the Ordovician Martinsburg Formation. Erosion of the Martinsburg shale in some areas of the mountain caused the sandstone to break and slide to form talus slopes. The Massanutten Sandstone is folded in a synclinorium, and it outcrops at the ridge tops.

== Mountains of Massanutten ==
- Lairds Knob
- Massanutten Peak
- Green Mountain
- Three Top Mountain
- Powell Mountain
- Little Crease Mountain
- Short Mountain
- Mertins Rock
- Bowman Mountain
- Kerns Mountain
- Catback Mountain
- Waterfall Mountain
- First Mountain
- Second Mountain
- Third Mountain
- Fourth Mountain
