= Shenandoah River =

River in Virginia and West Virginia, United States

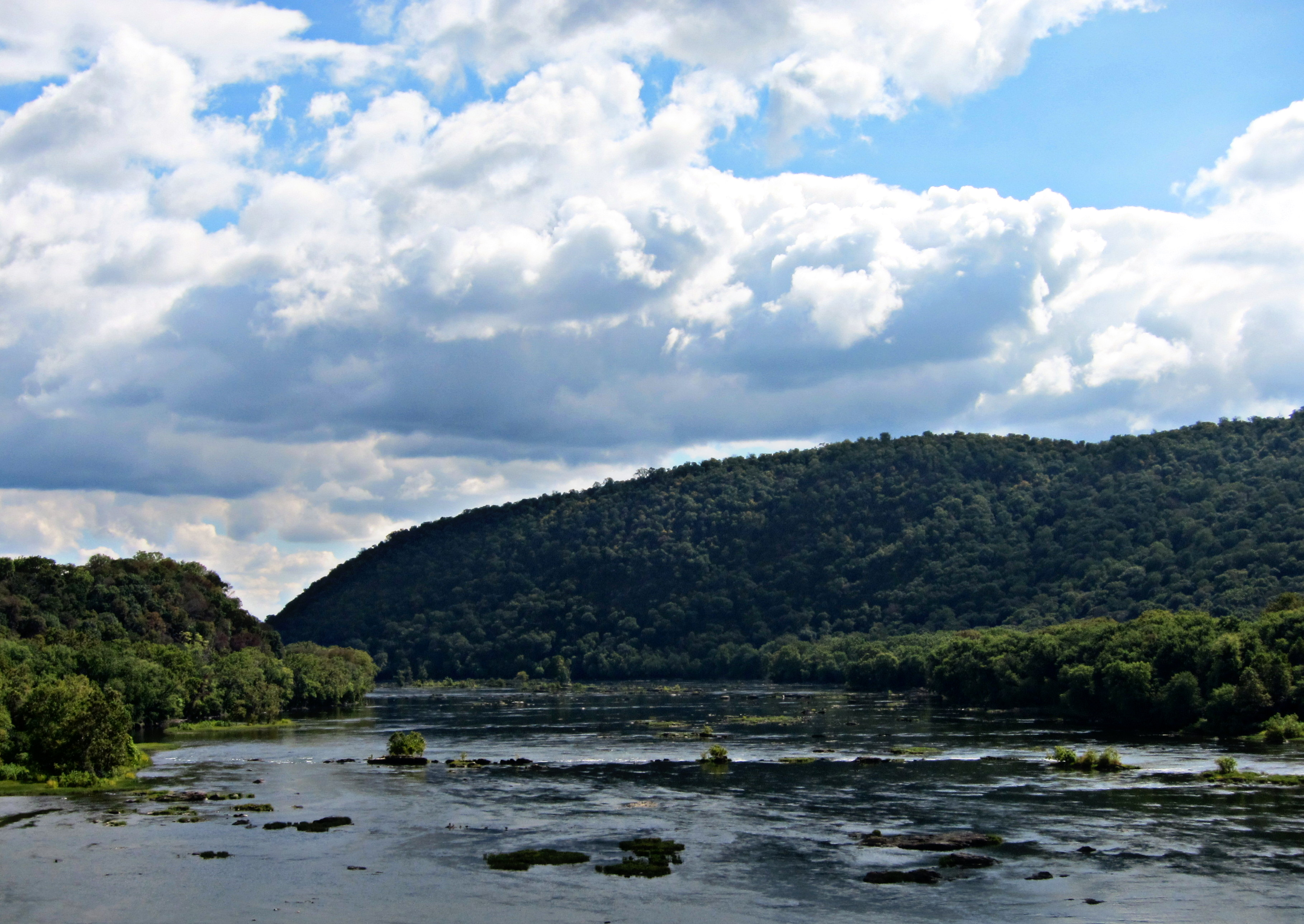
- Crossing the Shenandoah River in Harpers Ferry, West Virginia

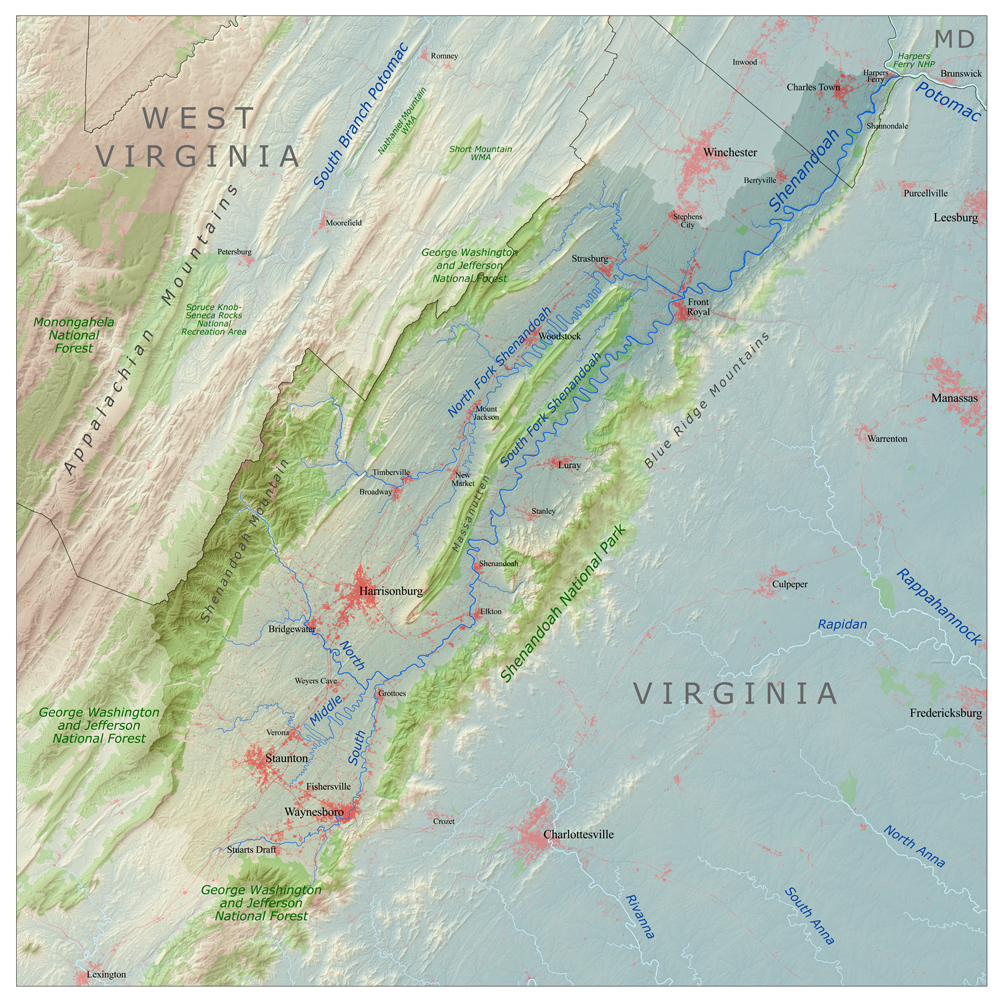
- Shenandoah River drainage basin

Location
- Country: United States
- State: Virginia, West Virginia
- Towns: Harpers Ferry, WV, Front Royal, VA, Luray, VA

Physical characteristics
- Source: North Fork
  - location: Shenandoah Mountain
- 2nd source: South Fork
  - location: Port Republic
- Source confluence
  - location: Front Royal, VA
- Mouth: Potomac River
  - location: Harpers Ferry
  - coordinates: 39.3226009°N 77.7277704°W
  - elevation: 246 ft (75 m)
- Length: 56 mi (90 km)
- Basin size: 2,937 sq mi (7,610 km^{2})
- Discharge
  - location: Millville, WV
  - average: 2,755 cu ft/s (78.0 m^{3}/s)

Basin features
- Tributaries
  - left: North Fork (Shenandoah River)
  - right: South Fork (Shenandoah River)

The Shenandoah River /ˌʃɛnənˈdoʊə/ is the principal tributary of the Potomac River, 55.6 miles (89.5 km) long with two forks approximately 100 miles (160 km) long each, in the U.S. states of Virginia and West Virginia. The river and its tributaries drain the central and lower Shenandoah Valley and the Page Valley in the Appalachians on the west side of the Blue Ridge Mountains, in northwestern Virginia and the eastern panhandle of West Virginia. There is a hydroelectric plant along the Shenandoah River constructed in 2014 by Dominion.

== Course ==
=== South Fork Shenandoah River ===
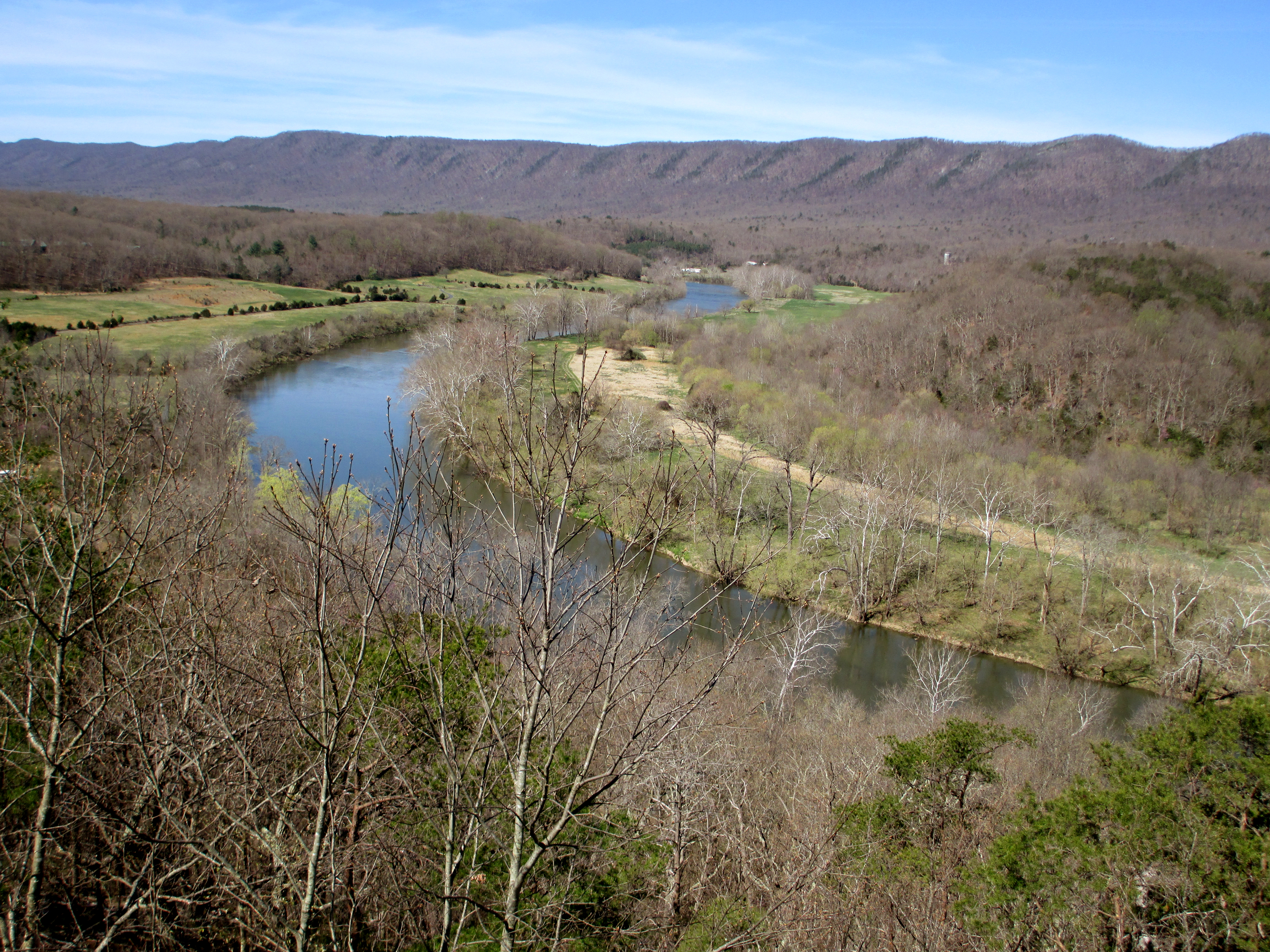
The South Fork Shenandoah River, with Massanutten Mountain in the background, as viewed from an overlook in Shenandoah River State Park

The South Fork is formed at Port Republic in southern Rockingham County, by the confluence of the North River and South River. It flows 98.5 miles (158.5 km) northeast in a tight meandering course, past Elkton and Shenandoah, through Page Valley, with the Blue Ridge Mountains to the east and the Massanutten Mountain range to the west.

=== North Fork Shenandoah River ===
The North Fork is 105 miles (169 km) long and rises in northern Rockingham County, along the eastern flank of Shenandoah Mountain in the George Washington National Forest. At its formation, the principal feeder on the North Fork is the German River.

The North Fork flows initially southeast, down from the mountains, then northeast through a valley across Shenandoah County, along the western side of Massanutten Mountain. It flows past Woodstock and Strasburg. On the north end of the ridge it turns briefly southeast to join the South Fork from the northwest to form the Shenandoah.

=== Main Course ===
The Shenandoah River is formed northeast of Front Royal near Riverton, by the confluence of the South Fork and the North Fork. It flows northeast across Warren County, passing underneath Interstate 66 1 mile (1.6 km) from its formation. Beyond the I-66 bridge, the river flows through a set of bends before turning to the northeast again, crossing into Clarke County 11 miles (18 km) below I-66. Five miles (8 km) downriver from the Clarke County border, the Shenandoah passes under U.S. Route 50 and then passes through a triple bend. 14.5 miles (23.3 km) below the Route 50 bridge, the river passes underneath State Route 7 and then continues northeast another 8 miles (13 km) where it crosses into Jefferson County in West Virginia. Once in West Virginia, the river completes six large bends before joining the Potomac from the southwest near Harpers Ferry. The confluence is on the West Virginia-Maryland border, and 0.4 miles (0.64 km) from the Virginia-West Virginia border.

== Geology ==
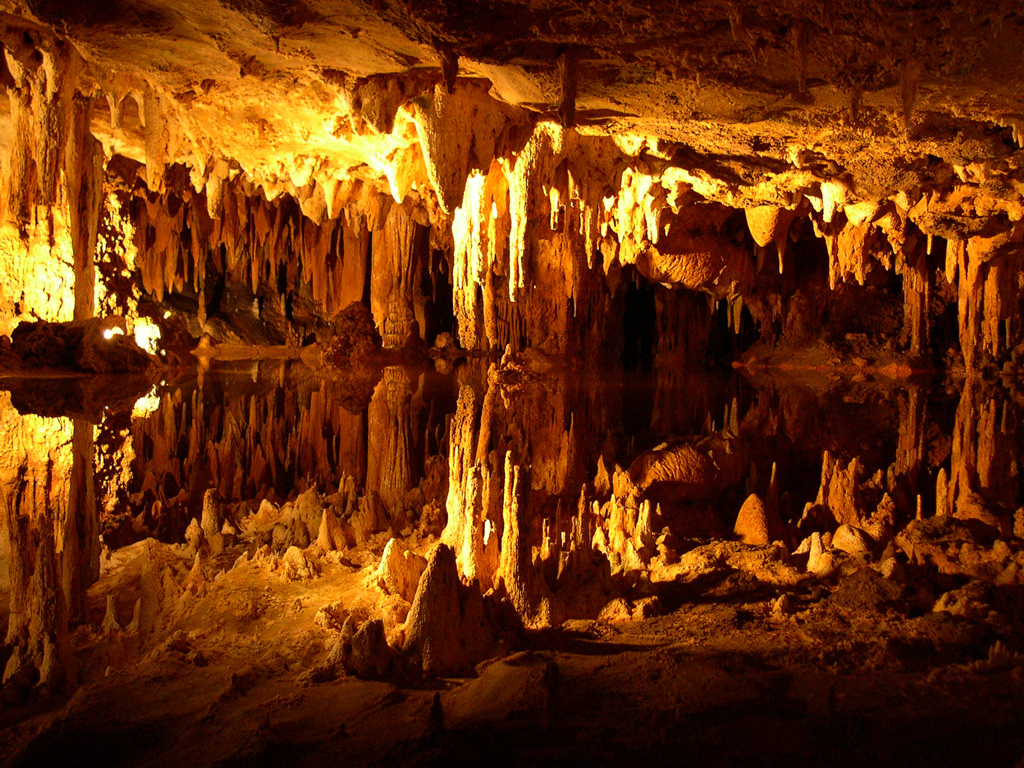
Dream Lake, inside Luray Caverns

The Shenandoah Valley is underlaid by limestone. The fertile soil made it a favored place for early settlement. It remains a major agricultural area of Virginia and West Virginia. Some karst topography is evident, and the limestone is honeycombed with caves. Several have been developed as commercial tourist attractions, including Luray Caverns, Shenandoah Caverns, and Skyline Caverns.

On the riverbank, a few miles above Harper's Ferry, is said to be a cave with an opening just large enough for a mounted rider to squeeze through. It widened in the interior to a spacious room where hundreds of Col. John Mosby's raiding troops are said to have hidden from pursuing Union cavalry.

== Environmental issues ==
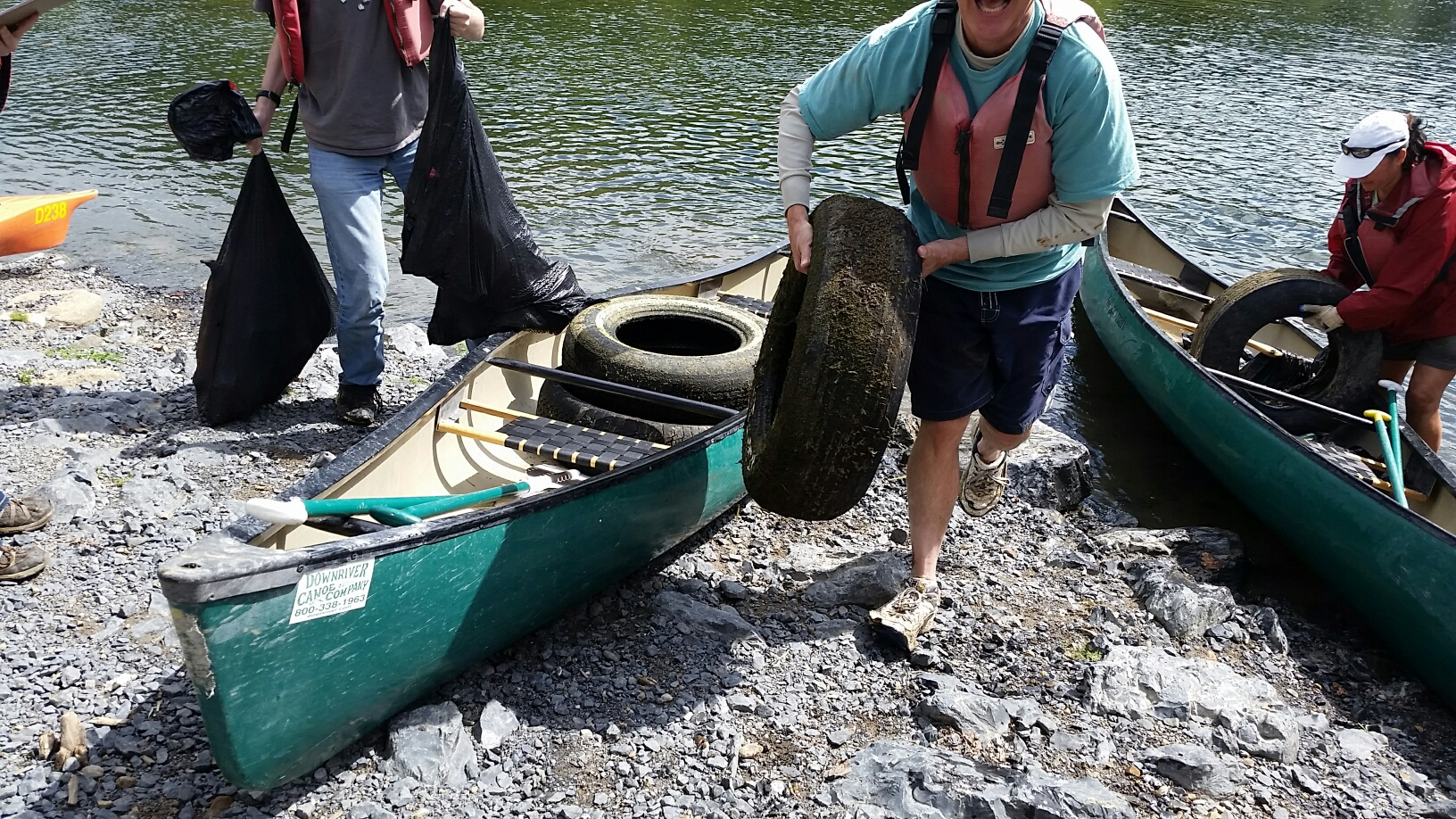
Volunteers cleaning up the river, 2015

=== Mercury contamination ===
The Shenandoah River was contaminated with mercury which was released by a DuPont rayon manufacturing facility located in Waynesboro, Virginia from 1929 to 1950. This mercury is still present in the fish population of the river today; data collected over the last several decades shows that mercury levels remain stable. The fish in many sections of the Shenandoah River are not safe for human consumption. For example, the Virginia Department of Health (VDOH) states that it is not safe to consume any species except trout which are caught between Waynesboro and Grottoes, Virginia due to elevated mercury levels. In general, the VDOH states that it is not safe to consume more than two fish per month which are caught on the Shenandoah River in Page, Warren, Augusta, or Rockingham counties.

In 2017, DuPont agreed to pay $42,069,916.78 to address natural resource damages and to implement restoration projects related to the impacted resources in the South Fork Shenandoah River watershed.

=== Fish kills ===
Since 2005, the Shenandoah River has experienced several springtime fish kills that have affected several of its native fish species. In 2005, redbreast sunfish and smallmouth bass along a 100-mile (160 km) stretch of the South Fork Shenandoah River began dying of lesions caused by bacteria and fungi. Although the fish kill eventually wiped out 80% of the adult redbreast sunfish and smallmouth bass, juvenile populations appeared to be unaffected. The following year more-localized fish kills in Clarke County spread to two of the Shenandoah's three species of sucker: the shorthead redhorse and the northern hogsucker – the former suffering from similar lesions witnessed in the previous year's fish kill. Virginia's Department of Environmental Quality received reports of fish kills near Elkton and between Bentonville and Front Royal in late April 2007 and observed fish exhibiting lesions and strange behavior.

== Etymology ==
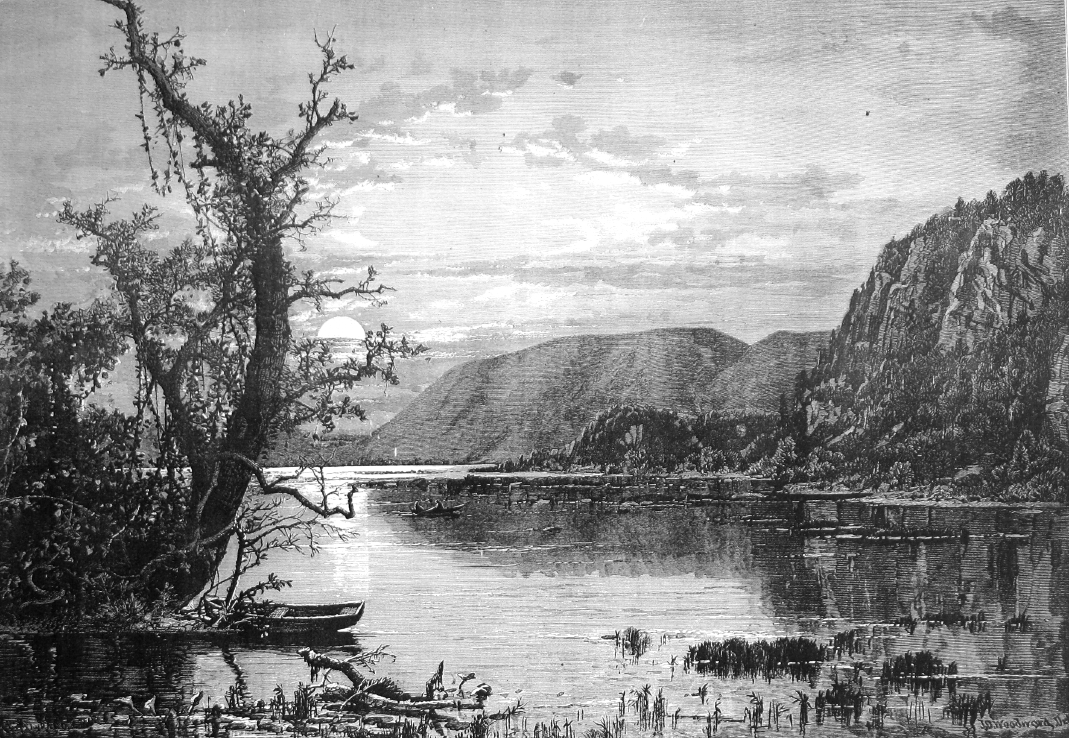
Moonlight on the Shenandoah, engraving by J.D. Woodward

Various accounts tell the origin of the name. According to one, General George Washington named the valley (and river) in honor of Skenandoa (or Shenandoah), an Oneida "pine tree chief" based in New York, who led hundreds of Oneida and Tuscarora warriors in support of the American rebels on the frontier during the Revolutionary War. He also sent much needed corn to Washington and his troops during their hard winter at Valley Forge, Pennsylvania in 1777–1778. However, the name was in use when Washington was a child, as evidenced in land grants and correspondence.

It is also said to be named after the Senedo people, a little-documented tribe said to have lived on the north fork of the river and destroyed by the Catawba, some time between 1650 and 1700.

== Recreation ==
The Shenandoah River is a popular river for canoeing, river tubing, and white-water recreation such as rafting and kayaking (class I-III in season, II-III+ during the spring run-off), and several commercial outfitters offer a variety of guided trips and rentals.

== Bridges ==
=== South Fork ===
- N Shenandoah Avenue (US 340/ US 522/ Va 55)
- Rivermont Drive (SR 619)
- Indian Hollow Road (SR 613)
- Bixlers Ferry Road (SR 675)
- Lee Highway (US 211/ US 340)
- US 340 BUS
- US 340
- Maryland Avenue (SR 602)
- Old Spotswood Trail (US 33 BUS)
- Spotswood Trail (US 33)
- Island Ford Road (SR 649)
- Lynnwood Road (SR 708)

=== North Fork ===
- Winchester Road (US 340)
- Strasburg Road (Va 55)
- Deer Rapids Road (SR 744)
- Colby Lane (low-water, on private property)
- Bear Paw Road
- Headly Road (SR 600)
- Hesley Bridge Lane
- Artz Road (SR 663)
- Woodstock Tower Road (SR 758)
- South Hollingsworth Road (SR 609)
- Laurel Hill Lane
- Edinburg Gap Road (SR 675)
- Palmyra Church Road (SR 698)
- Red Banks Road (SR T-698)
- Old Valley Pike (US 11)
- Wissler Road (SR 720)
- Caverns Road (SR 730)
- Interstate 81
- Quicksburg Road (SR 767)
- River Road (SR 728)
- Va 42
- Shenandoah Avenue (SR 1411)
- Spar Mine Road (SR 617)
- Brocks Gap Road (Va 259)
- Hopkins Gap Road (SR 612)
- Little Dry River Road (SR 818)
- Yankeetown Road
- Lairs Run Road
- Bergton Road (SR 820)
- Bergton Road (SR 820)

== Shenandoah tributaries ==
=== South Fork ===
- North River
  - Middle River
- South River
  - Back Creek
- Naked Creek
  - Mudhole Run
  - Deep Run
- Crooked Run
- Fultz Run
- Hickory Run
- Cub Run
  - Roaring Run
  - Pitt Spring Run
- Foltz Creek
- Honey Run
  - Line Run
- Stony Run
- Hawksclaw Creek
- Big Run
  - Georges Run
  - Browns Run
- Mill Creek
- Hawksbill Creek
  - Pass Run
  - Dry Run
  - Hollow Run
  - Chub Run
  - Beaver Run
  - Rocky Branch
- Jeremys Run
  - Moody Creek
  - Nelson Run
- Dry Mine Run
- Overall Run
- Gooney Creek

=== North Fork ===
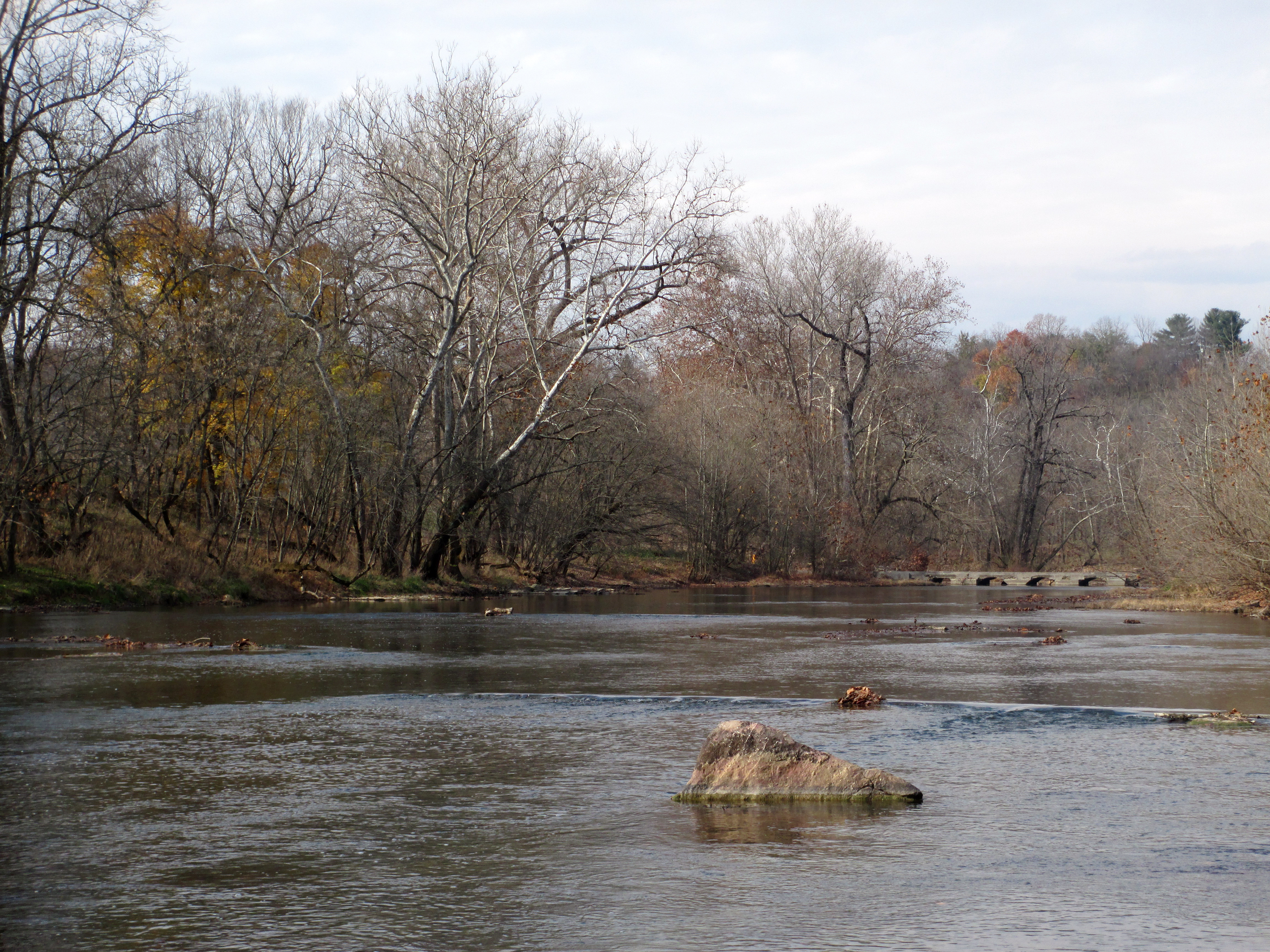
View of the North Fork of the Shenandoah River near Woodstock, Virginia

- German River
- Cedar Creek
- Smith Creek
- Toms Brook
- Passage Creek
- Linville Creek
- Shoemaker River
- Little Dry River
- Turley Creek
- Runions Creek

=== Main Course ===
==== West Virginia ====
- Hog Run
- Long Marsh Run
- Bullskin Run
- Evitts Run
- Forge Run
- Cattail Run
- Flowing Springs Run
- Stikeys Run
- Double Run

==== Virginia ====
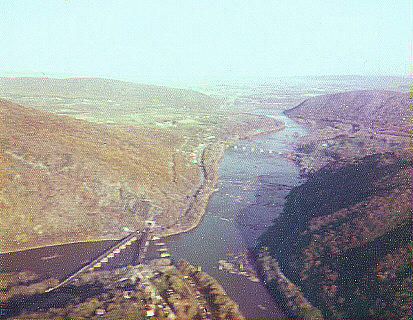
The confluence of the Potomac and Shenandoah Rivers, at Harpers Ferry, looking east. The Potomac flows from lower left to upper center, and the Shenandoah from bottom right-center to the confluence.

- Chapel Run
- Craig Run
- Dog Run
- Happy Creek
- Lewis Run
- Linville Creek
- Long Branch
- Manassas Run
- Morgan Mill Stream
- Passage Creek
- Spout Run
- Venus Branch
- Wheat Spring Run

== In popular culture ==
- The American folk song and river and sea chantey titled "Oh Shenandoah" has been adapted to explicitly reference the river or river valley, although earlier versions referred to the 18th century Oneida Chief Shenandoah and the Missouri River, 1,000 miles to the west
- The 1971 hit and signature song of John Denver, "Take Me Home, Country Roads", prominently mentions the Shenandoah River, and was adopted by the state of West Virginia in 2014 as its fourth official state song

== See also ==
- List of Virginia rivers
- List of West Virginia rivers
