= Lane County Courthouse (Kansas) =

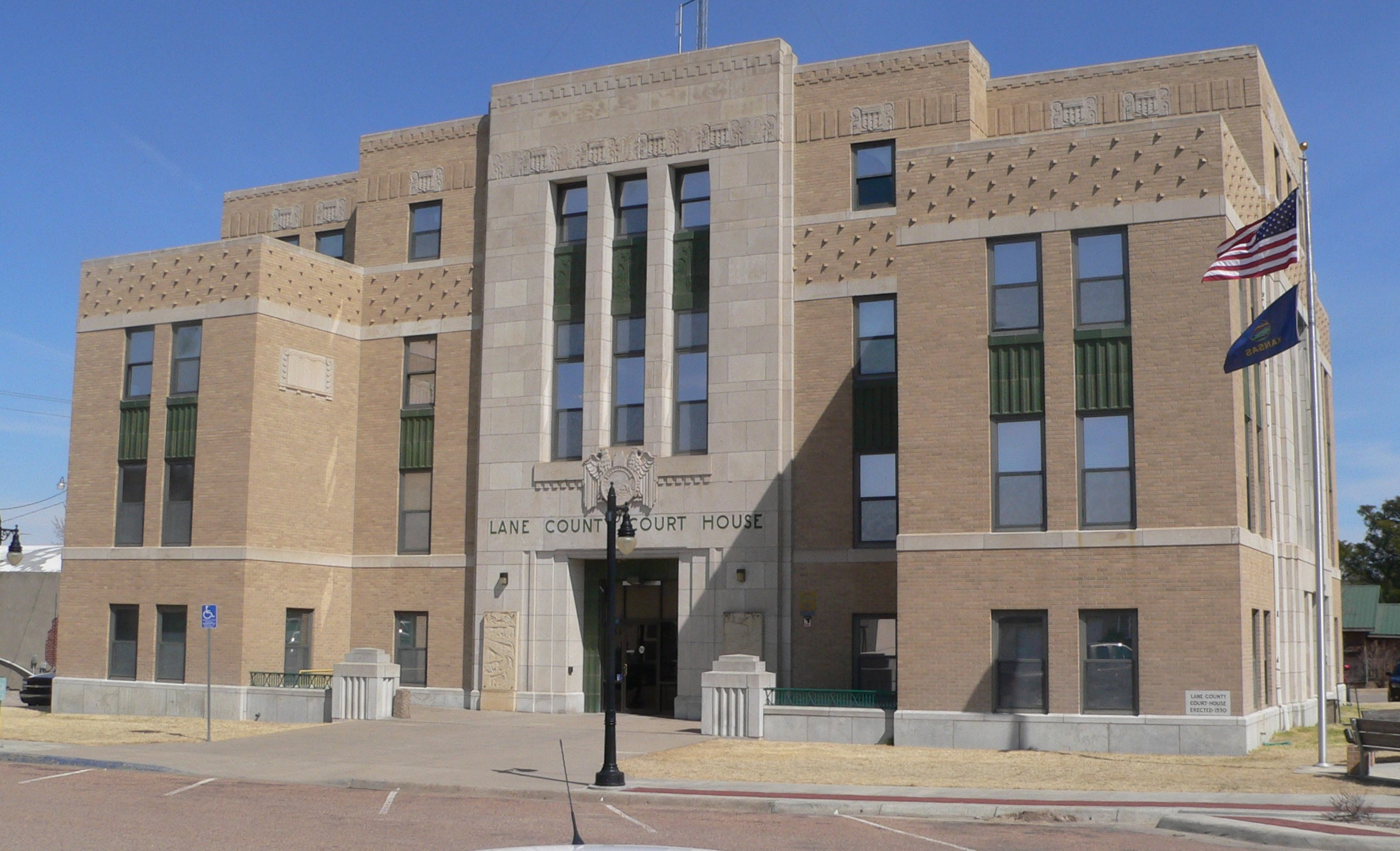

- Location within Kansas Location within the United States

General information
- Architectural style: Art Deco
- Location: 144 South Lane Street, Dighton, Kansas
- Coordinates: 38°28′52″N 100°27′54″W
- Construction started: 1930
- Completed: 1931

Design and construction
- Architect: Mann & Company
- Main contractor: H. W. Underhill Construction Company

The Lane County Courthouse, located at 144 South Lane Street in Dighton, is the seat of government of Lane County, Kansas. Dighton has been the county seat since 1886. The courthouse was built from 1930 to 1931 by H. W. Underhill Construction Company.

Mann & Company of Hutchinson, Kansas designed the courthouse in the Art Deco style. The courthouse is located on landscaped grounds, four stories, and faces west. It is constructed of buff-colored brick, concrete, and stone with a flat roof. Two wings project on the northwest and southwest sides of the building. The entrance has three large, rectangular windows which rise vertically above the entrance from the second to third stories.

The first courthouse was constructed when Dighton became the county seat. It was razed to build the present courthouse.

Mann & Company also designed courthouses in Ellis County, Ellsworth County, Graham County, Pratt County, Republic County, Scott County, Stafford County, and Stevens County.

== See also ==
- List of county courthouses in Kansas
