= Christopher Firmstone =

British graphic designer and visual artist

Christopher John Eldon George Firmstone (born 1937) is a British graphic designer and visual artist. His work as a designer is known by a number of art galleries in London, where his commissions include designs for exhibition posters and the design of rooms for the display of artworks, most notably at the Victoria and Albert Museum. His own artworks have been exhibited in London and New South Wales, Australia, and a selection of his architectural photographs are held in the Courtauld Institute of Art Conway photographic library in London.

== Biography ==
Firmstone was born in 1937, the birth being registered in Rowley, Staffordshire. An entry in the United Kingdom Births, Marriages and Deaths Register, dated April 1965, records marriage to Joan G. Kenrick.

== Career ==
=== Designer ===
Firmstone's work as designer was recognised by various art establishments particularly in London. This work includes designs for exhibition posters at the National Portrait Gallery, now held in the collection at the Victoria and Albert Museum. His work for the Royal Academy of Arts includes a poster for the exhibition Dante Gabriel Rossetti: Painter and Poet. Copies of the poster are archived in the collection of the British Council and Royal Academy.

Firmstone designed the galleries for the 1976 Victoria and Albert Museum show A Tonic to the Nation, which commemorated the 1951 Festival of Britain and was co-organized by art historian Bevis Hillier. Firmstone is also credited with the cover design, with others, of the pamphlet that accompanied the exhibition, a reference to which can be found in The Victoria and Albert Museum: A Bibliography and Exhibition Chronology, 1852-1996, by Elizabeth James.

Photographs of Firmstone's designs of Baroque in Bohemia, a 1969 show at the Victoria and Albert Museum, are reproduced in Michaela Malek's article which documents growing interest in Baroque design in the 1960s in Britain and Czechoslovakia. Malek notes that "Firmstone designed an architecture for the sculptures that recalled a vaulted basilica, with pillars and curving walls and niches for sculptures, which was ‘dramatically’ lit, supposedly to evoke the impression of a Baroque interior".

When the Courtauld Gallery moved in 1990 to Somerset House, Firmstone led the design team to create the space for the hanging of paintings and placement of art objects in its collection.

=== Artist ===
Firmstone's artworks suggest the influence of Modernism. His artworks have been exhibited in London and in New South Wales, Australia. In 2017 his work was included in the exhibition ‘Contemporary British Art’ at the Millinery Works in London.

=== Photography ===
Alongside his work at the Courtauld Gallery, photographs attributed to Firmstone are held in the Conway Library at the Courtauld Institute of Art Collection. The collection consists of mainly architectural images. Firmstone's photographs are of interiors of Somerset House, a building designed by the architect William Chambers (1723-1796).
