= Republic County Courthouse (Kansas) =

- U.S. National Register of Historic Places
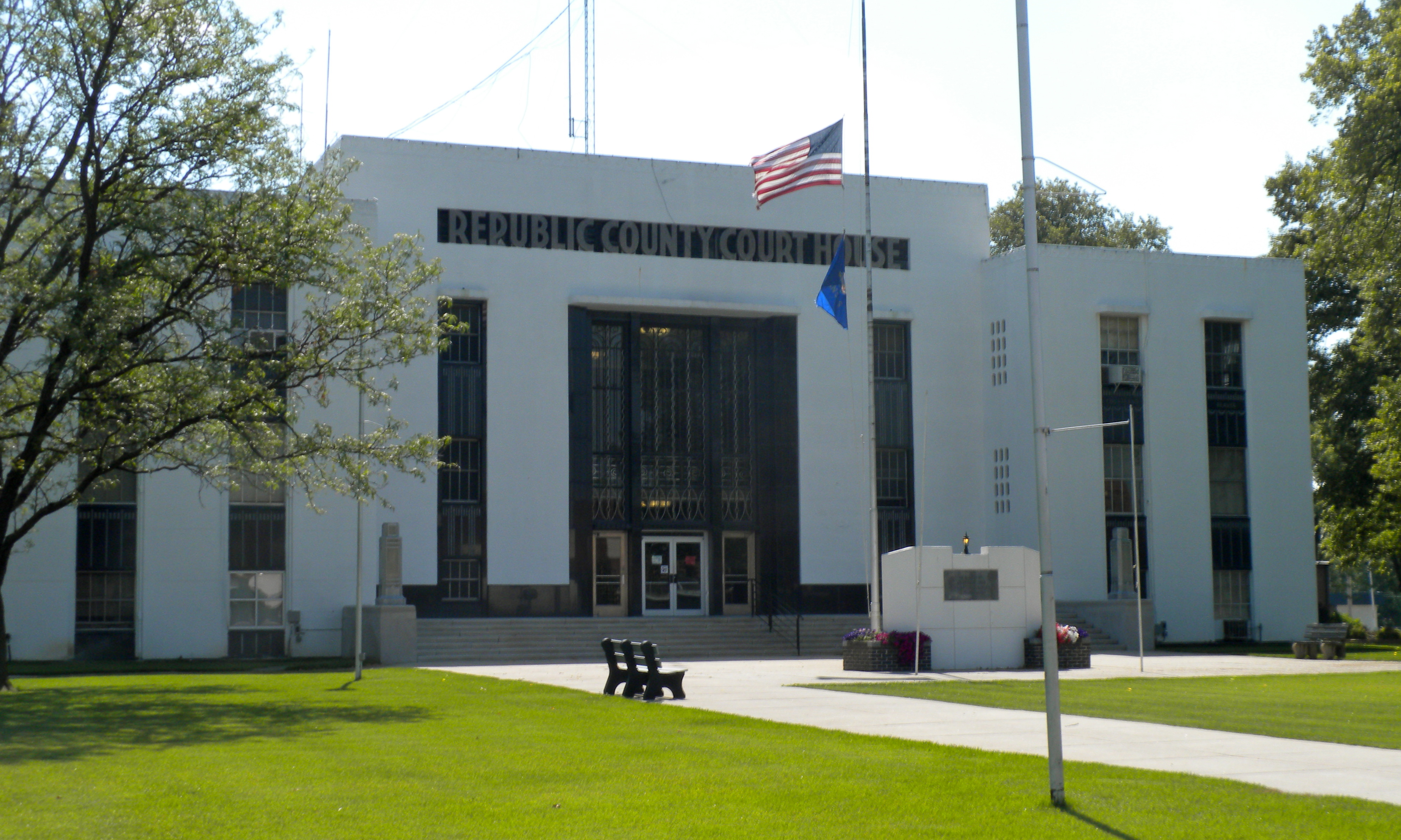

- Location within Kansas Location within the United States
- Interactive map showing the location of Republic County Courthouse
- Location: 1815 M Street, Belleville, Kansas
- Coordinates: 39°49′23″N 97°37′48″W
- Area: less than one acre
- Built by: Peterson Construction Company
- Architect: Mann & Company
- Architectural style: Art Deco
- MPS: County Courthouses of Kansas MPS
- NRHP reference No.: 02000393
- Added to NRHP: April 26, 2002

The Republic County Courthouse, located at 1815 M Street in Belleville, is the seat of government of Republic County, Kansas. Belleville has been the county seat since 1869. The courthouse was built from 1938 to 1939 by Peterson Construction Company of Salina, Kansas.

Architects Mann & Company of Hutchinson, Kansas designed the courthouse in the Art Deco style. The courthouse is located on spacious landscaped grounds, three to four stories, and faces west. It is constructed of white-colored concrete, glass, and concrete with a flat roof. The courthouse has seven bays on the east and west facades and six bays on the north and south facades. It was pored-in-place and has polished black granite detailing. The west front has a projecting center section with rectangular arch with a recessed entrance and vertical windows with metal grille work. During its construction, L. S. Nelson served as architectural superintendent. The cost of construction was $250,532 of which a Public Works Administration grant covered $112,936 of the total cost.

Pleasant Hill (now defunct) was temporarily designated as the county seat when Republic County was organized in 1868. An election the following year determined Belleville as the permanent seat. Residents of the southern part of Republic County successfully petitioned for another election in 1870. Belleville was again determined to be the permanent seat.

The first courthouse was constructed in 1869 at a cost of $3,000. The second courthouse was designed by George Ropes. It was three stories and built in 1885 of brick by Hulse & Mosses and Ulrich Brothers at a cost of $24,344; it was destroyed by a fire in 1938.

Mann & Company also designed courthouses in Ellis County, Ellsworth County, Graham County, Lane County, Pratt County, Scott County, Stafford County, and Stevens County.

== See also ==
- List of county courthouses in Kansas
