= Ellsworth County Courthouse (Kansas) =

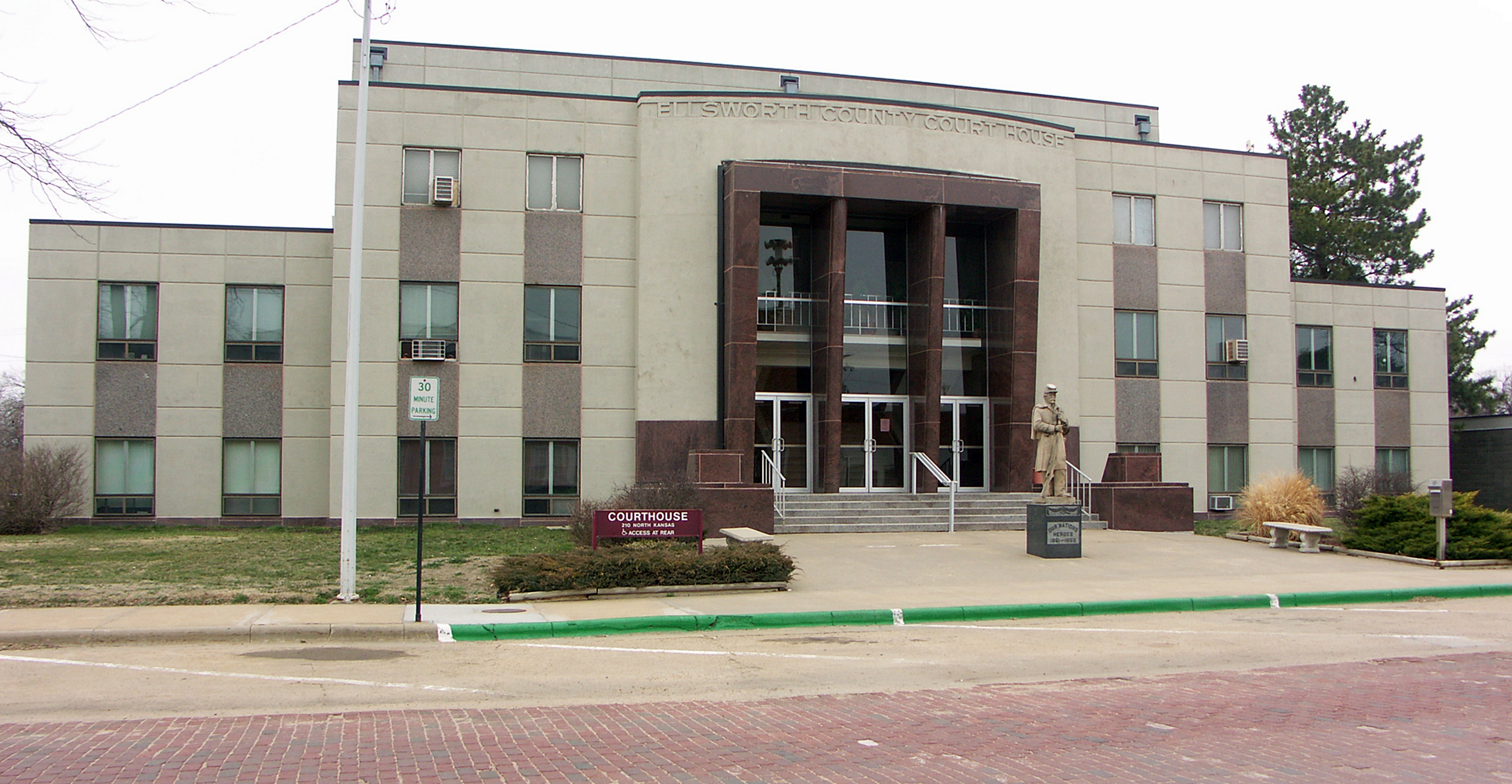
- Ellsworth County Courthouse (2013)

- Location within Kansas Location within the United States

General information
- Architectural style: Modern
- Location: 210 North Kansas Avenue, Ellsworth, Kansas
- Coordinates: 38°43′50″N 98°13′54″W
- Construction started: 1953
- Completed: 1954

Design and construction
- Architect: Mann & Company
- Main contractor: Walter Armngost Construction Company

The Ellsworth County Courthouse, located at 109 East 1st Street in Ellsworth, is the seat of government of Ellsworth County, Kansas. Ellsworth has been the county seat since 1867. The courthouse was built from 1953 to 1954 by contractor Walter Armngost Construction Company of Wichita, Kansas.

Mann & Company of Hutchinson, Kansas designed the courthouse in the Modern style. The courthouse is two stories and faces southeast. It is constructed of buff-colored brick and concrete with a flat roof. The entrance is surrounded and windows above it are surrounded by a polished red granite projection that is supported by two round columns of the same polished granite. In front of the main steps is a carved stone monument of a Union Army soldier from the American Civil War mounted atop a square, polished gray granite pedestal presented to the county by children who raised funds for the monument.

The first courthouse was two stories and constructed of brick in 1872 at a cost of $12,000. The second courthouse was two stories, constructed of red-colored brick and stone, with an arched entrance, and an imposing central clock tower built by J. W. Gardinier in 1889 and designed by George W. Schafer; it was razed to build the present courthouse.

Mann & Company also designed courthouses in Ellis County, Graham County, Lane County, Pratt County, Republic County, Scott County, Stafford County, and Stevens County.

== See also ==
- List of county courthouses in Kansas
