= Stafford County Courthouse (Kansas) =

- Location within Kansas Location within the United States

General information
- Architectural style: Art Deco
- Location: 209 North Broadway Street, St. John, Kansas
- Coordinates: 38°0′4″N 98°45′35″W
- Construction started: 1928
- Completed: 1929

Design and construction
- Architect: Mann & Company
- Main contractor: W. G. Colglazier, C. A. Jordan, R. H. Benford, E. S. Nightwine, and J. H. Tudor

The Stafford County Courthouse, located at 209 North Broadway Street in St. John, is the seat of government of Stafford County, Kansas. St. John has been the county seat since 1867. The courthouse was built from 1928 to 1929 by W. G. Colglazsier, C. A. Jordan, R. H. Benford, E. S. Nightwine, and J. H. Tudor as a Works Progress Administration (WPA) project. Three other county courthouses in Kansas are fully WPA or Public Works Administration (PWA) buildings: Ellis County, Jewell County, and Kearny County.

Mann & Company of Hutchinson, Kansas designed the courthouse in the Art Deco style. The courthouse is located on landscaped grounds, three stories, and faces northwest. It is constructed of buff-colored brick and concrete, with a flat roof. On the east side is a one-story detached annex constructed of buff-colored brick and concrete.

The first courthouse was erected in 1880. The second courthouse was a two-story structure built from 1886 to 1887 of red-colored brick and native stone with a tall central cupola with space for four clock faces; the clock was never purchased. W. G. Colglazier, C. A. Jordan, R. H. Benford, E. S. Nightwine and J. H. Tudor signed a contract to demolish the second courthouse and construct the present courthouse. While it was being built the county offices were located in the Delker Building.

Mann & Company also designed courthouses in Ellis County, Ellsworth County, Graham County, Pratt County, Republic County, Scott County, and Stevens County.

== See also ==
- List of county courthouses in Kansas
