= Ellis County Courthouse (Kansas) =

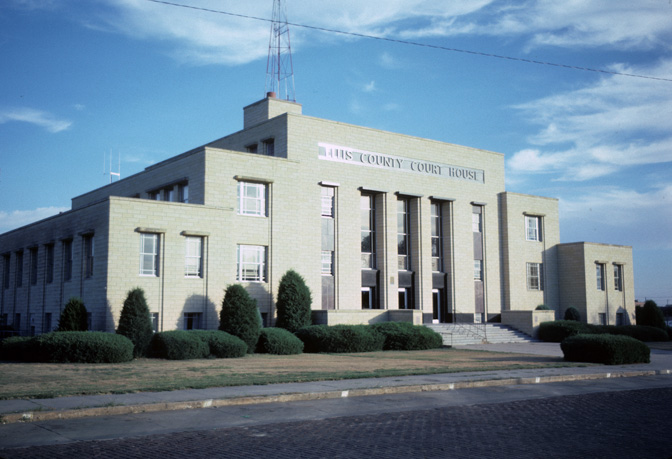

- Location within Kansas Location within the United States

General information
- Architectural style: Modern
- Location: 1204 Fort Street, Hays, Kansas
- Coordinates: 38°52′25″N 99°19′51″W
- Construction started: 1940
- Completed: 1942

Design and construction
- Architect: Mann & Company
- Main contractor: Ralph Hunter Construction

The Ellis County Courthouse, located at 1204 Fort Street in Hays City, is the seat of government of Ellis County, Kansas. Hays has been the county seat since 1867. The courthouse was built from 1940 to 1942 by Ralph Hunter Construction as a Works Progress Administration (WPA) project. Three other county courthouses in Kansas are fully WPA or Public Works Administration (PWA) buildings: Jewell County, Kearny County, and Stafford County.

Mann & Company designed the courthouse in the Modern style. The courthouse is two stories and faces west. It is constructed of yellow-colored brick with a flat roof. Three large, rectangular windows rise vertically above the entrance, which is an aluminum canopy that was not part of the original construction.

The first courthouse was a two stories and constructed of native stone in 1873. The second courthouse was built by Zeigler & Dalton in 1898 of native stone. It was designed by C. W. Squires.

Mann & Company also designed courthouses in Ellsworth County, Graham County, Lane County, Pratt County, Republic County, Scott County, Stafford County, and Stevens County.

== See also ==
- List of county courthouses in Kansas
