= Jack Hillier (art historian) =

British art historian

Jack Ronald Hillier (29 August 1912 – 5 January 1995) was a British scholar of Japanese art.

== Biography ==
Hillier was born on 29 August 1912 in Fulham, England to Charles Hillier and his wife Minnie (née Davies). His father was a postman; one of five siblings, Hillier had a "happy, if slightly impoverished, childhood." His only early "tenuous connection with art was that his father, during his rounds, delivered the mail of Edward Burne Jones, the noted late Victorian artist, who lived in Kensington." He left Fulham Secondary School at 15 and worked for an insurance company until 1967. During World War II he served in the Royal Air Force. Although he applied to be a pilot, "regrettably, the detailed work that he carried out during the day, combined with his wood engraving, had slightly impaired his eyesight, and his application, therefore, was not accepted".

Hillier became interested in Japanese ukiyo-e art in the 1940s, when it was at a low ebb in terms of interest from the West. He collected Japanese prints, books, and paintings. He taught himself to draw and make prints, and in 1951 had Old Surrey Watermills published, with his own illustrations.

Hillier went on to become a leading European ukiyo-e scholar. He assisted in the formation of several collections, and catalogued collections by those such as Henri Vever. He was cataloguer for Japanese prints at Sotheby's for 25 years. Hillier had his first book on ukiyo-e, Japanese Masters of the Colour Print, published by Phaidon Press in 1954. He followed with the monographs Hokusai in 1955, Utamaro in 1961, and Hokusai Drawings in 1966. In his critical assessments, Hillier notably compared the ukiyo-e artist Sharaku to the French painter Paul Cézanne, suggesting that both artists struggled to express themselves, as if hindered and frustrated by the limits of their own draughtsmanship. Later books include The Uninhibited Brush (1974), about the Shijō school of painting; The Art of Hokusai in Book Illustration (1980); and The Art of the Japanese Book (1987). Hillier eventually sold his Nanga and Shijō paintings to Oxford's Ashmolean Museum and his collection of books to the British Museum.

Hiller gave the Cohn Memorial Lecture at Oxford in 1977; he was the only speaker to deliver it who had never held an academic or museum post. He was subject to a Festschrift on his 70th birthday in 1982. The Japanese government conferred on him the Rising Sun with Gold Rays and Rosette.

Hillier married Mary Louise Palmer in 1938, with whom he had a son, the historian Bevis Hillier, and daughter, Mary Alison. He died in Redhill, Surrey, on 5 January 1995.
