= Hutchinson Blue Dragons =

Sports teams of Hutchinson Community College

- University: Hutchinson Community College
- Association: NJCAA
- Conference: Kansas Jayhawk Community College Conference
- Athletic director: Josh Gooch
- Location: Hutchinson, Kansas
- Varsity teams: 12
- Football stadium: Gowans Stadium
- Basketball arena: Hutchinson Sports Arena
- Baseball stadium: Hobart–Detter Field
- Softball stadium: Fun Valley Sports Complex
- Soccer stadium: USD 308 Salthawk Sports Complex
- Nickname: Blue Dragons
- Colors: Scarlet and Blue
- Website: www.bluedragonsports.com

The Hutchinson Blue Dragons are the sports teams of Hutchinson Community College located in Hutchinson, Kansas, United States. They participate in the National Junior College Athletic Association (NJCAA) and in the Kansas Jayhawk Community College Conference.

== Sports ==
Men's sports

- Baseball
- Basketball
- Cross country
- Football
- Track & field
- Golf

Women's sports

- Basketball
- Cross country
- Soccer
- Softball
- Track & field
- Volleyball

== Facilities ==
Hutchinson Community College has five facilities.

- Fun Valley Softball Complex – home of the Blue Dragons softball team
- Gowans Stadium – home of the Blue Dragons football team
- Hobart–Detter Field – home of the Blue Dragons baseball team
- Hutchinson Sports Arena – home of the Blue Dragons men's and women's basketball teams, and volleyball team
- USD 308 Salthawk Sports Complex – home of the Blue Dragons soccer team; also shared with USD 308 Hutchinson Public Schools

== Coaches ==
Men's Sports

- Baseball – Brock Nehls
- Basketball – Kyle Fisher
- Cross Country – Jafet Molinares
- Football – Drew Dallas
- Track and Field – Robert Spies
- Golf - Chris Young

Women's Sports

- Basketball – John Ontjes
- Cross Country – Jafet Molinares
- Soccer – Sammy Lane
- Softball – Jaime Rose
- Track and Field – Robert Spies
- Volleyball – Dayana Acevedo Trent

== Notable athletes ==
- De'Vondre Campbell, professional football player for the San Francisco 49ers
- Andy Dirks, former outfielder for the Detroit Tigers
- Markus Golden, former professional football player for the Arizona Cardinals, New York Giants, and Pittsburgh Steelers
- Shaun Hill, former professional football player for the Minnesota Vikings, San Francisco 49ers, Detroit Lions, and St. Louis Rams
- Darius Johnson-Odom, professional basketball player for the Springfield Armor
- Alvin Kamara, professional football player for the New Orleans Saints
- Cordarrelle Patterson, professional football player for the Pittsburgh Steelers
- Mike Zagurski, former reliever for the Philadelphia Phillies, Arizona Diamondbacks, Pittsburgh Pirates and New York Yankees
- Devonte Wyatt, professional football player for the Green Bay Packers.

== See also ==
- Hutchinson Sports Arena
