= Graham County Courthouse (Kansas) =

- Location within Kansas Location within the United States

General information
- Architectural style: Modern
- Location: 410 North Pomeroy Street, Hill City, Kansas
- Coordinates: 39°22′5″N 99°50′29″W
- Construction started: 1957
- Completed: 1958

Design and construction
- Architect: Mann & Company

The Graham County Courthouse, located at 410 North Pomeroy Street in Hill City, is the seat of government of Graham County, Kansas. Hill City has been the county seat since 1880. The courthouse was built from 1957 to 1958 by the architects Mann & Company of Hutchinson, Kansas.

Mann & Company designed the courthouse in the Modern style. The courthouse is located on spacious landscaped grounds in the northeast of the city. It is one story and faces south. It is constructed of glass and concrete with a flat roof.

The first courthouse was two stories and constructed of native stone in 1888 by James P. Pomeroy and W. R. Hill. It had a central clock tower with four faces.

Mann & Company also designed courthouses in Ellis County, Ellsworth County, Lane County, Pratt County, Republic County, Scott County, Stafford County, and Stevens County.

== See also ==
- List of county courthouses in Kansas
