= Arthur R. Mann =

American architect and engineer (1877–1968)

- Born: June 28, 1877; Sheffield, England
- Died: July 7, 1968 (aged 91); Hutchinson, Kansas
- Occupation: Architect
- Awards: Fellow, American Institute of Architects (1955)
- Practice: Kelso, Mann & Kelso; Kelso, Mann & Gerow; Mann & Gerow; Mann & Company

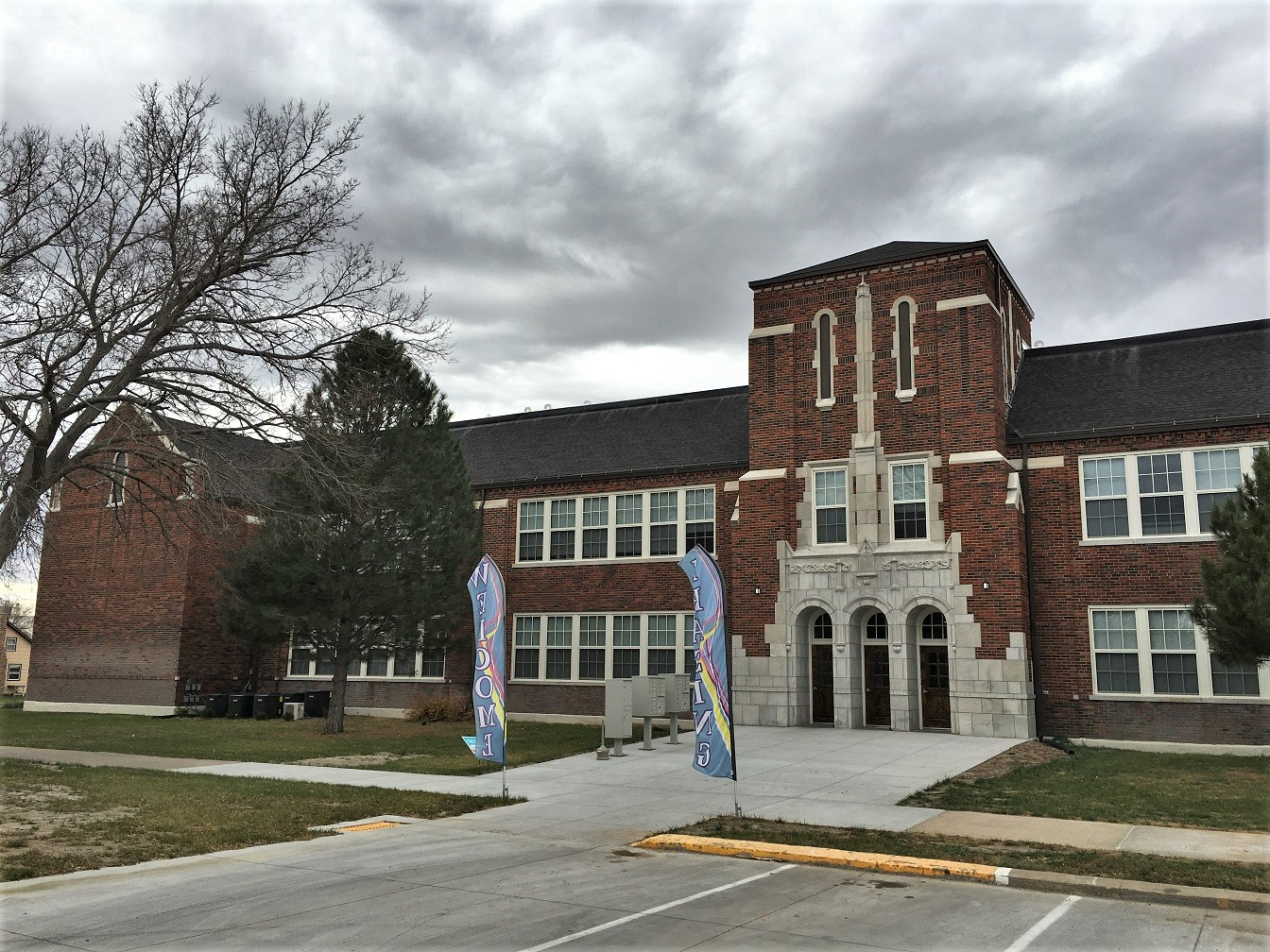
The former Grant School in Goodland, designed by Mann & Company and completed in 1926.

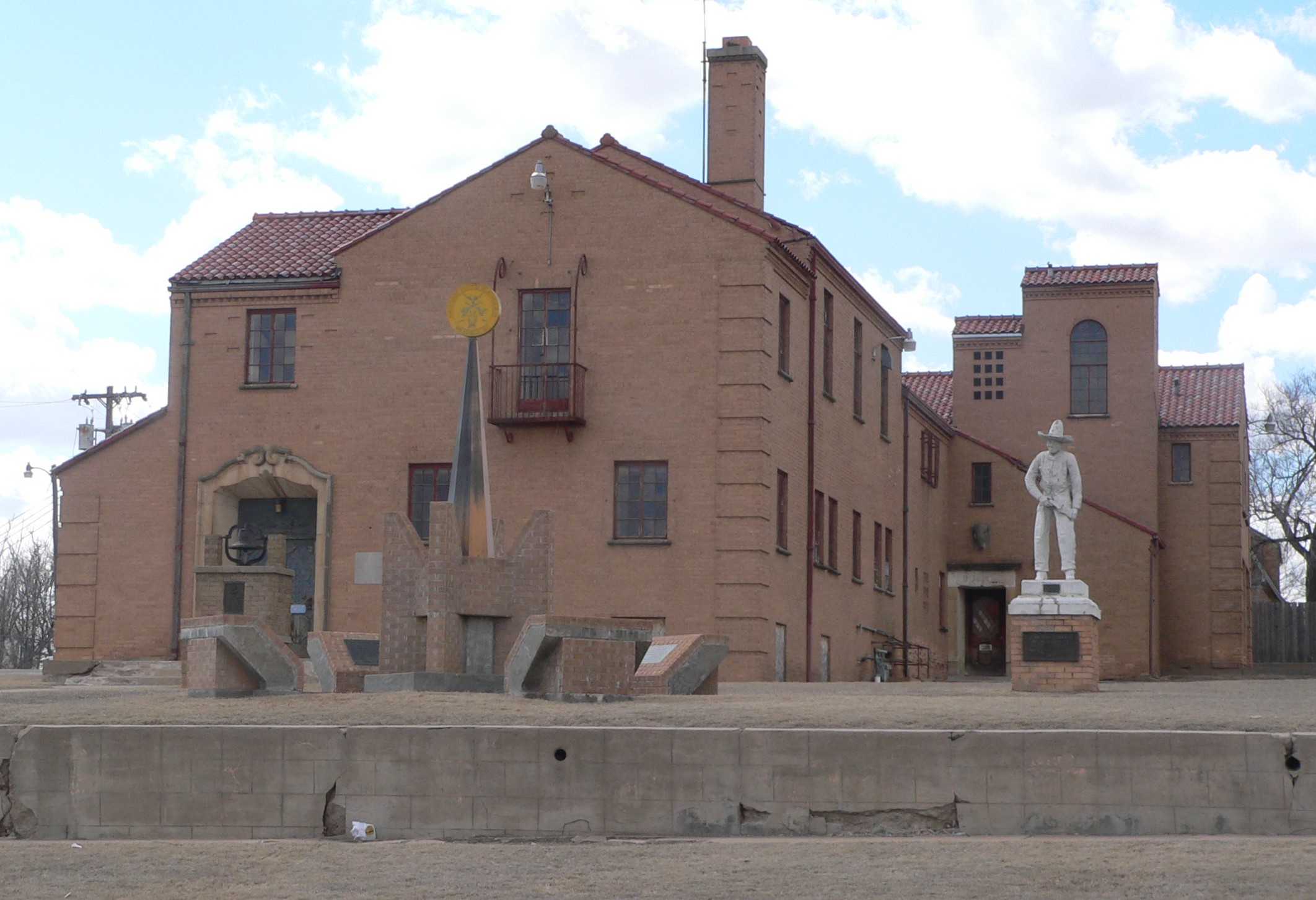
The Dodge City Municipal Building in Dodge City, designed by Mann & Company and completed in 1930.

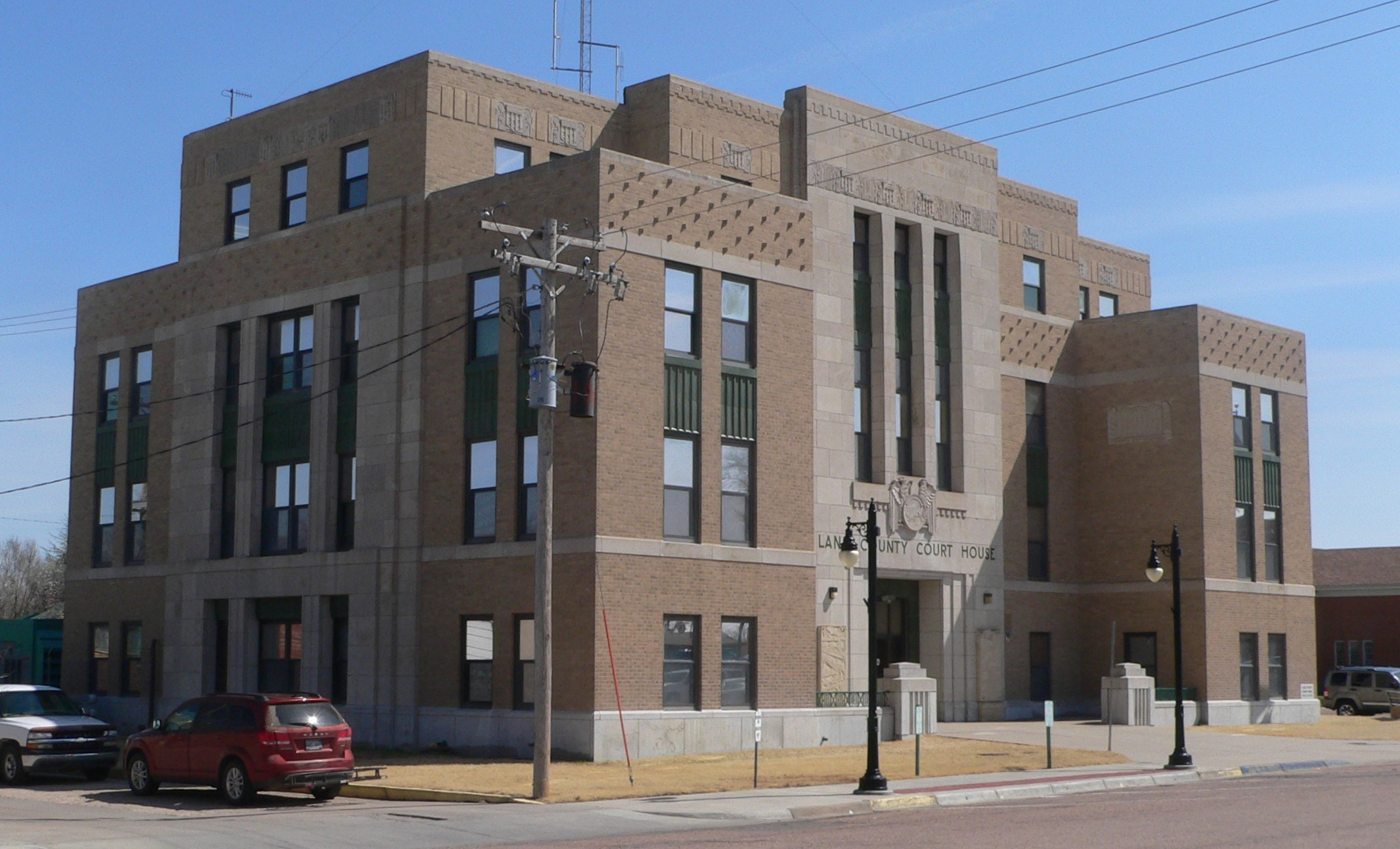
The Lane County Courthouse in Dighton, designed by Mann & Company and completed in 1931.

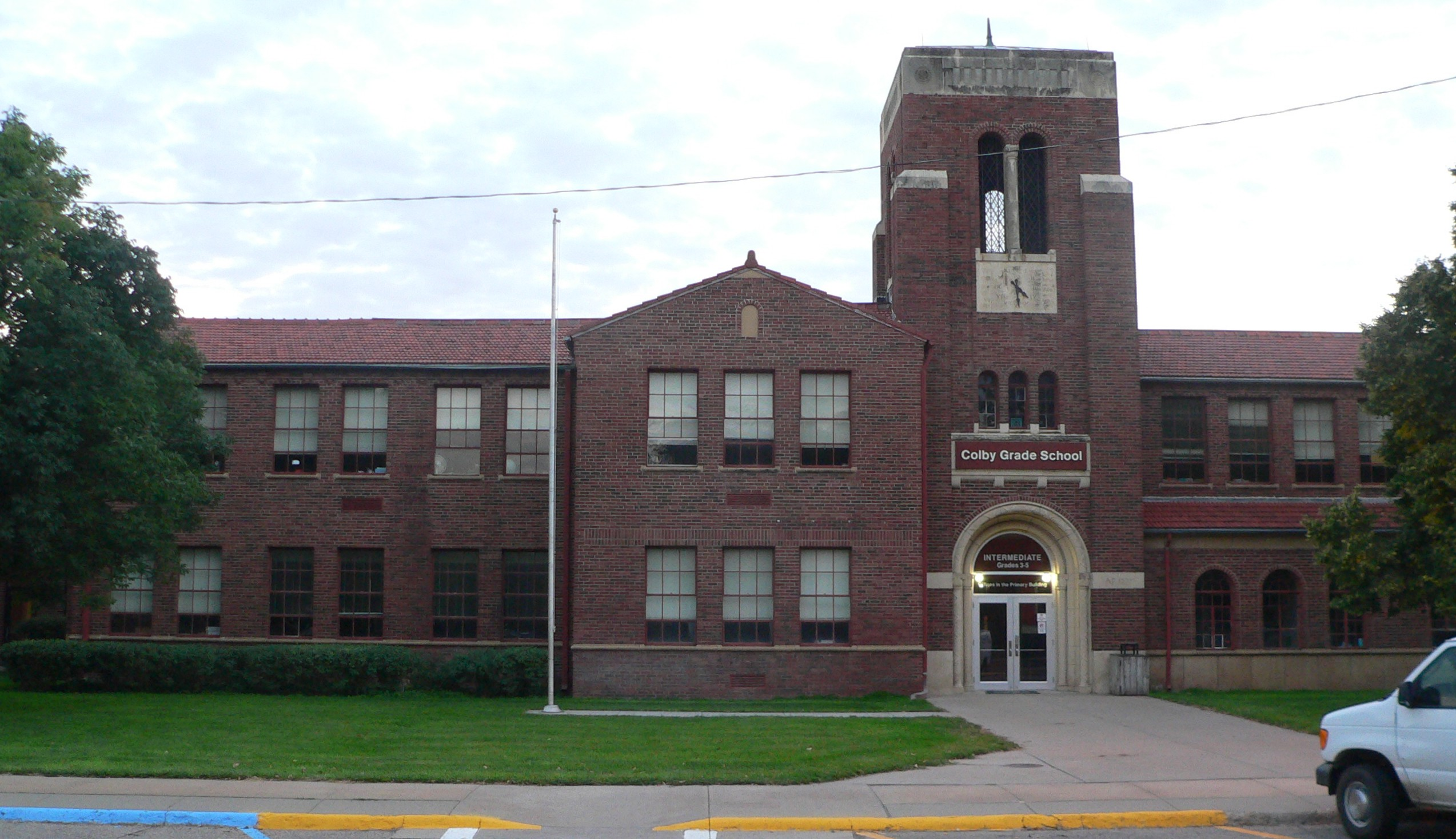
The Colby Community High School in Colby, designed by Mann & Company and completed in 1935.

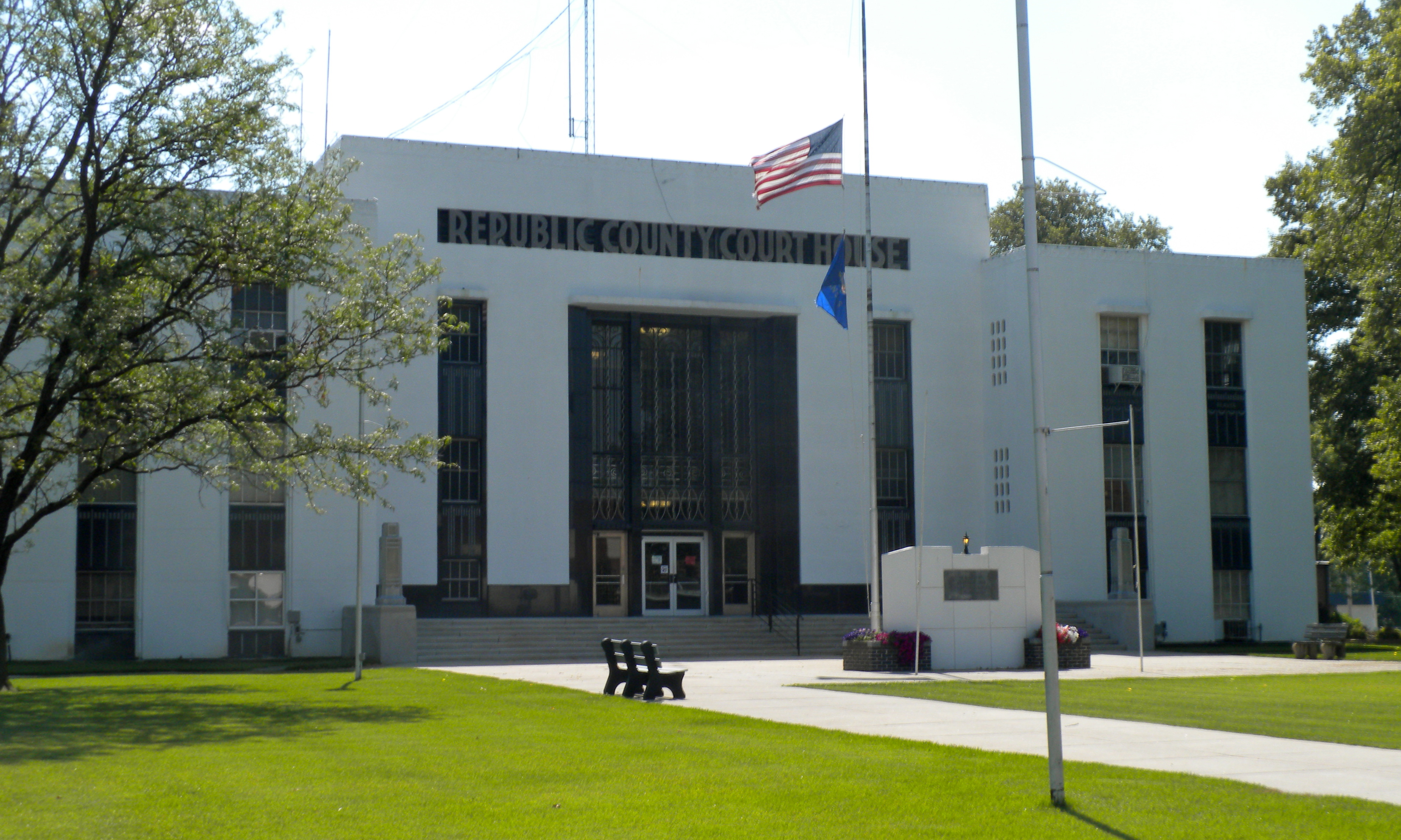
The Republic County Courthouse in Belleville, designed by Mann & Company and completed in 1939.

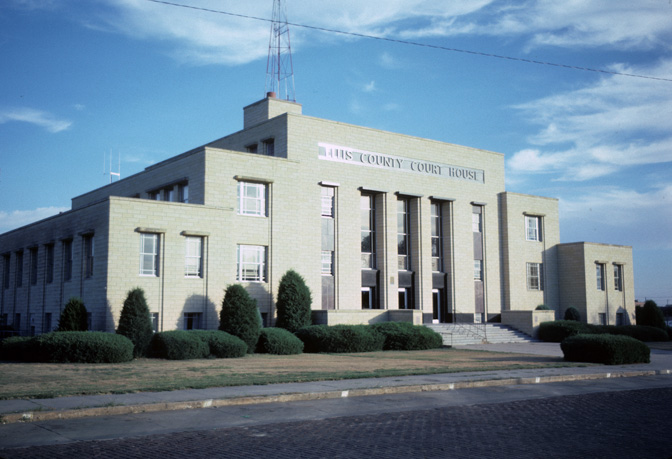
The Ellis County Courthouse in Hays, designed by Mann & Company and completed in 1942.

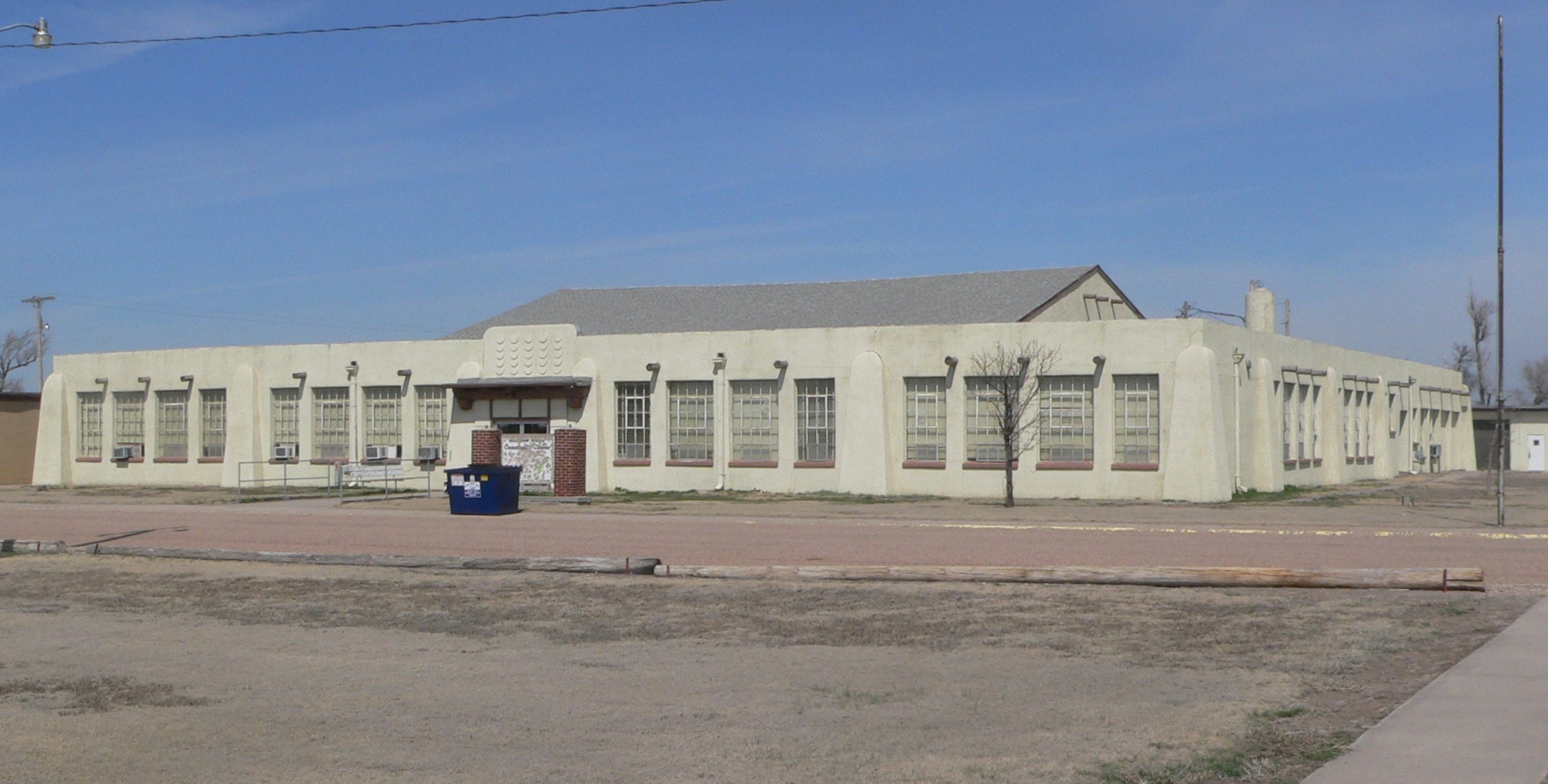
The Shallow Water School in Shallow Water, designed by Mann & Company and completed in 1942.

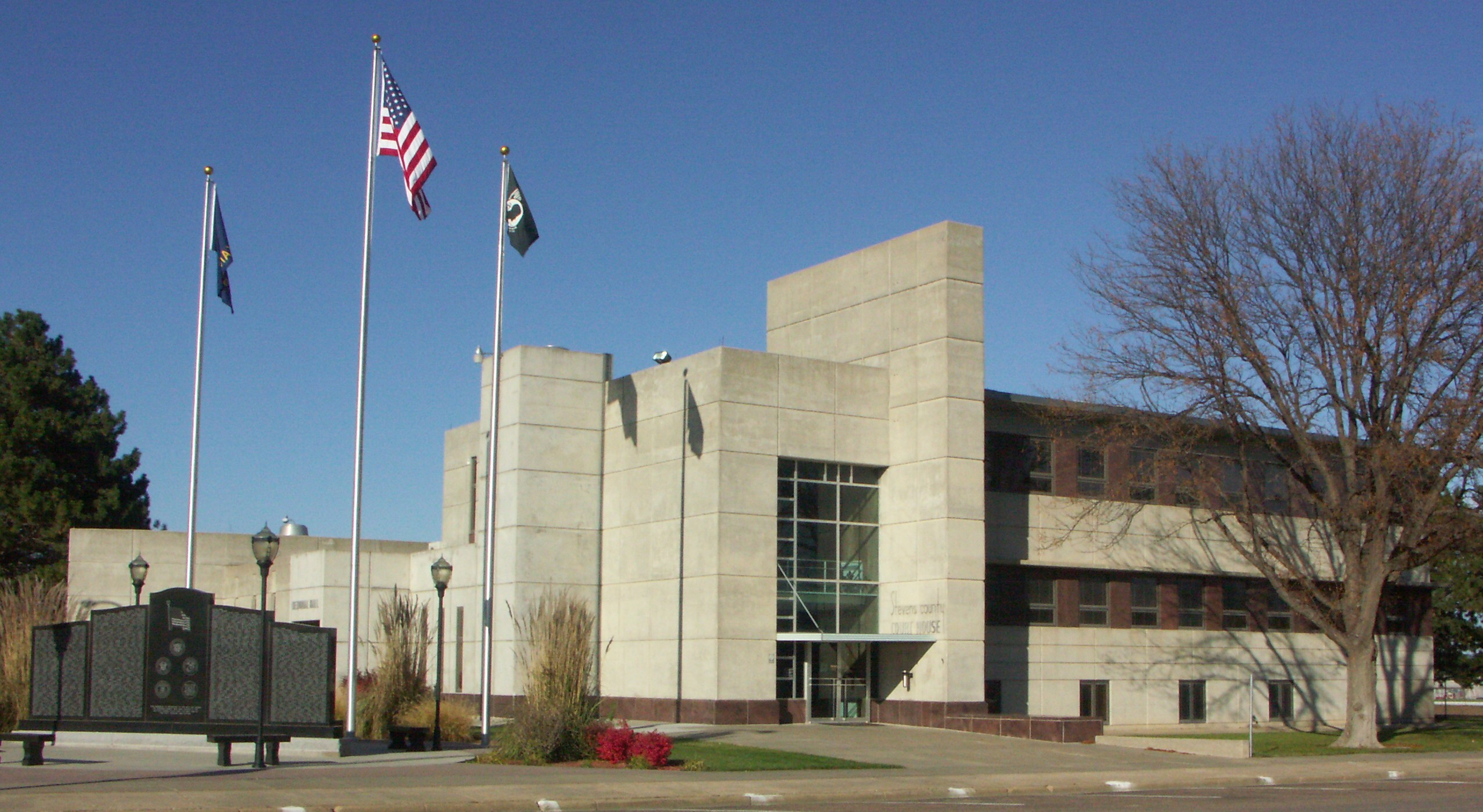
The Stevens County Courthouse in Hugoton, designed by Mann & Company and completed in 1952.

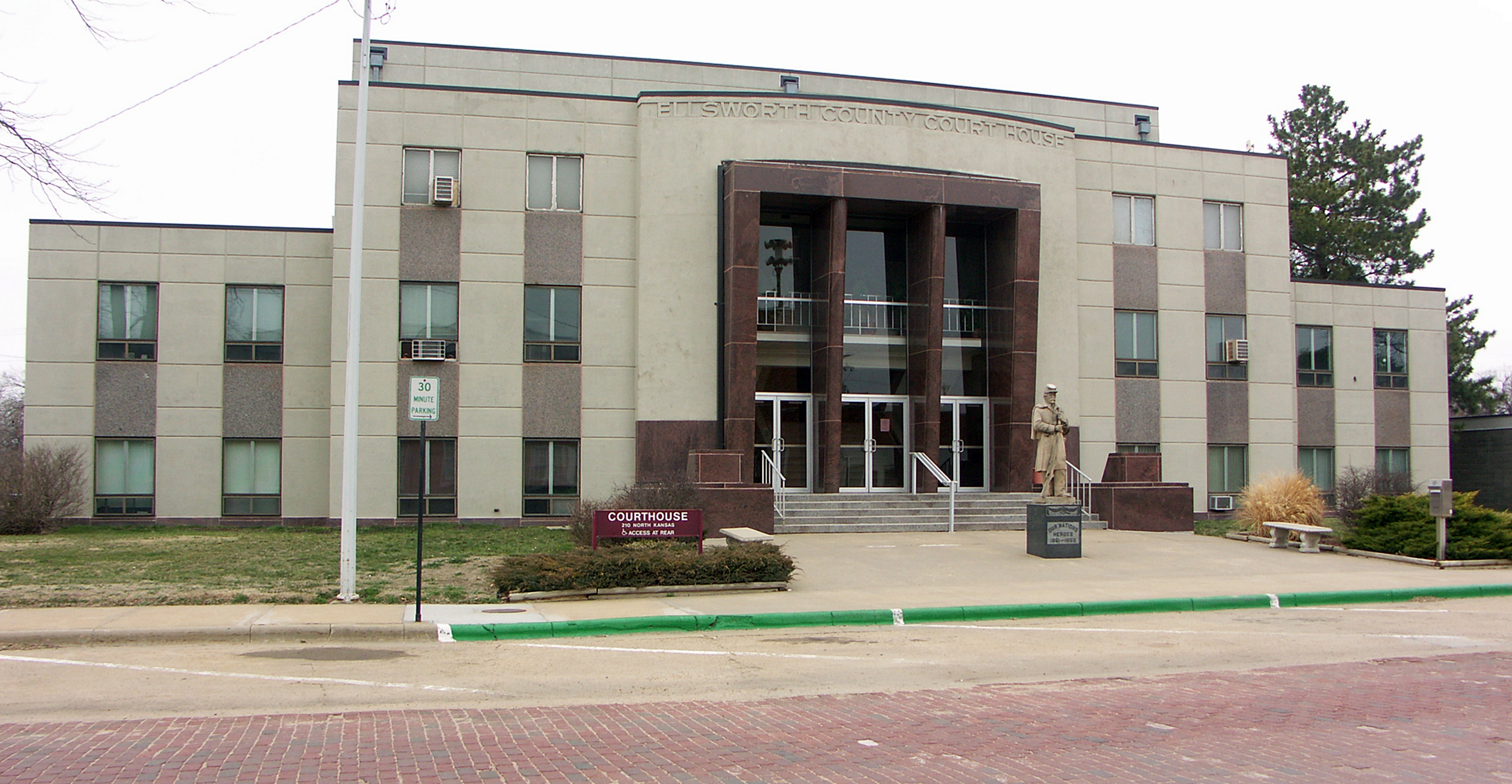
The Ellsworth County Courthouse in Ellsworth, designed by Mann & Company and completed in 1954.

Arthur R. Mann FAIA (June 28, 1877 – July 7, 1968) was an English-born American architect and engineer in practice in Hutchinson, Kansas from 1909 until his retirement in 1965. In 1924 he formed the firm of Mann & Company, which remained under family ownership until 1977 and is still in business.

== Life and career ==
Arthur Robert Mann was born June 28, 1877, in Sheffield, England to George Mann and Eliza Mann, née Lingard. The family immigrated to the United States in 1879, settling in Kansas. He became a naturalized citizen in 1887. Mann was educated at the defunct Nickerson Normal College and the University of Kansas, graduating from the latter in 1906 with a BS in engineering. He worked for the Chicago, Rock Island and Pacific Railroad before moving to Hutchinson, where in 1909 he formed the partnership of Kelso, Mann & Kelso, architects and engineers. During this year he also completed a correspondence course in architecture. The partnership was reorganized in 1910 as Kelso, Mann & Gerow and in 1911 as Mann & Gerow with the withdrawal of the Kelsos and the admission of Theodore M. Gerow. In 1924 Gerow withdrew from the partnership and Mann continued the firm as Mann & Company, a sole proprietorship. In 1934 Mann's son, Robert E. Mann AIA, joined the firm as a partner. In 1965 Mann retired from the partnership, but continued as a consultant.

In 1918 Mann was a founding member and first president of the Kansas Society of Architects, the first successful attempt to organize architects in the state. In 1921 joined the American Institute of Architects (AIA) as a member of the newly formed Kansas chapter. He was highly active in the organization, and was Kansas chapter president three times. In 1955 he was elected a Fellow for service to the institute and for public service. Mann was the third Kansas architect to be elected a Fellow under the modern system instituted in 1898.

== Legacy ==
Mann's architecture firm has continued into the present day. After his retirement architects Winston A. Schmidt AIA and Norman L. Mann AIA, Arthur Mann's brother, Albert Mann's grandson, became partners in the firm, followed in 1974 by Harry R. Rutledge FAIA and Lynn W. Schwartzkopf AIA. Robert E. Mann retired in 1977, and shortly thereafter Schimidt and Norman L. Mann died in a plane crash while returning from a client meeting. In 1978 the firm was purchased from the Mann estate by Rutledge and Schwartzkopf. In 1981 they incorporated the firm as Mann & Company PA, and in 1987 Rutledge withdrew to join BASCO Associates in York, Pennsylvania. Schwartzkopf has continued to lead the firm into the 21st century.

At least seven works by Mann and his partners have been listed on the United States National Register of Historic Places, and others contribute to listed historic districts.

== Personal life ==
Mann was married in 1904 to Ida May Smith. They had two children, Dorothy and Robert Eugene. Mann died July 7, 1968, at the age of 91.

== Architectural works ==
=== Kelso, Mann & Kelso, 1909–1910 ===
- 1911 – Memorial Hall, (Note: A contributing resource to the Downtown Core South Historic District, NRHP-listed in 2004.) 101 S Walnut St, Hutchinson, Kansas

=== Kelso, Mann & Gerow, 1910–1911 ===
- 1910 – P. H. Meehan House, (Note: NRHP-listed.) 401 N Columbus St, Tampa, Kansas

=== Mann & Gerow, 1911–1924 ===
- 1913 – First Christian Church, 15 S 1st St, Herington, Kansas
- 1918 – Lee Larrabee house, (Note: Now the Coronado Museum.) 567 E Cedar St, Liberal, Kansas
- 1919 – Great American Life Insurance Company home office, (Note: Now the Reno County Museum. A contributing resource to the Downtown Core South Historic District, NRHP-listed in 2004.) 100 S Walnut St, Hutchinson, Kansas
- 1919 – Hoover Pavilion, Wright Park, Dodge City, Kansas
- 1920 – Hooker High School, 301 Broadway St, Hooker, Oklahoma
- 1922 – Brewster High School, 127 Kansas Ave, Brewster, Kansas
- 1922 – Harnly Hall, (Note: Demolished.) McPherson College, McPherson, Kansas
- 1923 – Peabody-Burns Junior/Senior High School, 900 N Walnut St, Peabody, Kansas
- 1923 – Zion Lutheran Church, 1017 N Washington St, Hutchinson, Kansas

=== Mann & Company, from 1924 ===
- 1924 – Pratt County Courthouse rebuilding, 300 S Ninnescah St, Pratt, Kansas
- 1925 – Scott County Courthouse, 303 Court St, Scott City, Kansas
- 1926 – Grant School, 520 W 12th St, Goodland, Kansas
- 1926 – 1927 Clayton L. Moses Memorial Bandshell (Great Bend, Kansas), Courthouse Square, Great Bend, Kansas
- 1927 – Central Elementary School, 1100 Central Ave, Dodge City, Kansas
- 1927 – St. Francis Community High School, 100 College St, St. Francis, Kansas
- 1928 – Dodge City High School, 1601 1st Ave, Dodge City, Kansas
- 1928 – Masonic Temple, 2015 Lakin Ave, Great Bend, Kansas
- 1929 – Leon Hotel (former), 14 E 2nd Ave, Hutchinson, Kansas
- 1929 – Stafford County Courthouse, 209 N Broadway St, St. John, Kansas
- 1930 – Dodge City Municipal Building, 501 W Spruce St, Dodge City, Kansas
- 1930 – Lyons High School, (Note: Formerly NRHP-listed. Demolished.) 401 S Douglas Ave, Lyons, Kansas
- 1930 – Scott Community High School, 712 Main St, Scott City, Kansas
- 1931 – Lane County Courthouse, 144 S Lane St, Dighton, Kansas
- 1931 – Wolf Park Band Shell, Wolf Park, Ellinwood, Kansas
- 1935 – Colby Community High School, 750 W 3rd St, Colby, Kansas
- 1938 – Russell High School (former), 400 N Elm St, Russell, Kansas
- 1939 – Republic County Courthouse, 1815 M St, Belleville, Kansas
- 1942 – Ellis County Courthouse, 1204 Court St, Hays, Kansas
- 1942 – Shallow Water School, 180 Barclay Ave, Shallow Water, Kansas
- 1944 – Manweiler-Maupin Chevrolet, 271 S Main St, Hoisington, Kansas
- 1950 – American Legion Hall, 315 N Main St, Russell, Kansas
- 1952 – Fowler High School, 100 W 8th Ave, Fowler, Kansas
- 1952 – Hutchinson Sports Arena, 710 E 11th Ave, Hutchinson
- 1952 – Stevens County Courthouse, 200 E 6th St, Hugoton, Kansas
- 1953 – Dotzour Hall, McPherson College, McPherson, Kansas
- 1953 – Memorial Union expansion, University of Kansas, Lawrence, Kansas
- 1953 – Phillipsburg Elementary School, 300 Nebraska Ave, Phillipsburg, Kansas
- 1954 – Ellsworth County Courthouse, (Note: Designed by Mann & Company, architects, with John G. Seitz of Ellsworth, associate architect.) 210 N Kansas Ave, Ellsworth, Kansas
- 1954 – Oakley High School, 118 W 7th St, Oakley, Kansas
- 1955 – Dodge City Civic Center, 2100 1st Ave, Dodge City, Kansas
- 1958 – Graham County Courthouse, 410 N Pomeroy St, Hill City, Kansas
- 1960 – Dunklau Gardens, 450 E 23rd St, Fremont, Nebraska
- 1960 – Hutchinson High School, 810 E 13th St, Hutchinson, Kansas
- 1960 – Memorial Union expansion, University of Kansas, Lawrence, Kansas
- 1960 – Mohler Hall and Brown Auditorium, McPherson College, McPherson, Kansas
- 1961 – Hoffman Student Union, McPherson College, McPherson, Kansas
- 1963 – Ness City High School, 414 E Chestnut St, Ness City, Kansas
- 1966 – Lincoln Library, 201 N Main St, Medicine Lodge, Kansas
- 1967 – Medicine Lodge City Office, 114 W 1st Ave, Medicine Lodge, Kansas
- 1968 – Ray E. Dillon Jr. house, 301 W 20th Ave, Hutchinson, Kansas
- 1969 – Memorial Union expansion, University of Kansas, Lawrence, Kansas
- 1969 – Bob Wilson Memorial Hospital, 415 N Main St, Ulysses, Kansas
- 1973 – First National Bank Center, (Note: Structurally incorporating the original First National Bank Building, designed by D. H. Burnham & Company and completed in 1911.) 1 N Main St, Hutchinson, Kansas
- 1983 – Hutchinson Middle School 7, 210 E Ave A, Hutchinson, Kansas
- 1983 – Hutchinson Middle School 8, 200 W 14th Ave, Hutchinson, Kansas
