= Dodge City Legend =

- League: USBL 2000–2007
- Founded: 2000
- History: Dodge City Legend; 2000–2007
- Arena: Dodge City Civic Center
- Location: Dodge City, Kansas
- Team colors: Purple, silver, black
- Head coach: Dale Osbourne
- Ownership: Dodge City Basketball
- Championships: 3 2000, 2003, 2005

The Dodge City Legend was a professional basketball franchise located in Dodge City, Kansas in the United States Basketball League, a minor league that played in the spring. The Legend won three USBL titles, in 2000, its first season, 2003 and in 2005.

The Legend drew fans from surrounding towns, such as Garden City and Liberal. They played their home games at the Dodge City Civic Center.

== Colors and nickname ==
The Legend's colors were purple, black and silver. The nickname came from the cowtown history of Dodge City, which has been immortalized in numerous feature films and the television program, Gunsmoke.

== Seasons ==
| Stagione | League | Name | W | G | % | Place | Play-off |
|---|---|---|---|---|---|---|---|
| 2000 | USBL | Dodge City Legend | 22 | 8 | 73,3 | 1º | Champions |
| 2001 | USBL | Dodge City Legend | 15 | 15 | 50,0 | 4º | Final |
| 2002 | USBL | Dodge City Legend | 12 | 18 | 40,0 | 4º | Quarter finals |
| 2003 | USBL | Dodge City Legend | 25 | 5 | 83,3 | 1º | Champions |
| 2004 | USBL | Dodge City Legend | 22 | 8 | 73,3 | 1º | Semifinals |
| 2005 | USBL | Dodge City Legend | 18 | 12 | 60,0 | 2º | Champions |
| 2006 | USBL | Dodge City Legend | 19 | 11 | 63,3 | 2º | Final |
| 2007 | USBL | Dodge City Legend | 20 | 8 | 71,5 | 1º | Round robin |

== Notable players ==
- Kenny Gregory
- Darrin Hancock
- Jamario Moon
- Jimmy King
- Oliver Miller
- Sun Mingming
- Roy Tarpley
- David Bell
- Chad LaCross
- Ricky de Aragon
