= Art Deco of the 20s and 30s =

1968 book by Bevis Hillier

- Softcover edition
- Author: Bevis Hillier
- Language: English
- Subject: History of art, Art Deco
- Genre: Essay
- Published: 1968
- Publisher: Studio Vista
- Publication place: United Kingdom
- Media type: Print
- Pages: 164 pp.
- ISBN: 0289277884
- OCLC: 40363

Art Deco of the 20s and 30s is an art history book by English historian Bevis Hillier. It was initially published in 1968 by Studio Vista. The author discusses how the style of cubism, expressionism, Ancient Egyptian art, Mayan art, and so on influenced Art Deco, and how Art Deco itself changed the style of disciplines as various as modern architecture, jewelry, ceramics, tableware, metalwork, glass, textiles, and many others.

== Content ==
1. What is Art Deco?
2. How Art Deco Developed
3. The Interregnum
4. Influence of Cubism, Expressionism, Futurism, Vorticism.
5. Influence of the Russian Ballet
6. Influence of American Indian Art
7. Influence of Ancient Egyptian Art
8. The Twenties
9. The Thirties
10. The Arts of Art Deco
11. The Revival

== Influence ==
According to historian Thomas Mellins, it was the publication of this book in 1968 that popularised the term Art Deco. Otherwise, the genre may have been referred to as Art Moderne.

== See also ==
- Art Deco Architecture: Design, Decoration and Detail from the Twenties and Thirties
- Art Deco stamps
- International style
- List of Art Deco architecture
- Paris architecture of the Belle Époque
- Paris between the Wars (1919–1939)
