= Cordarrelle Patterson =

American football player (born 1991)

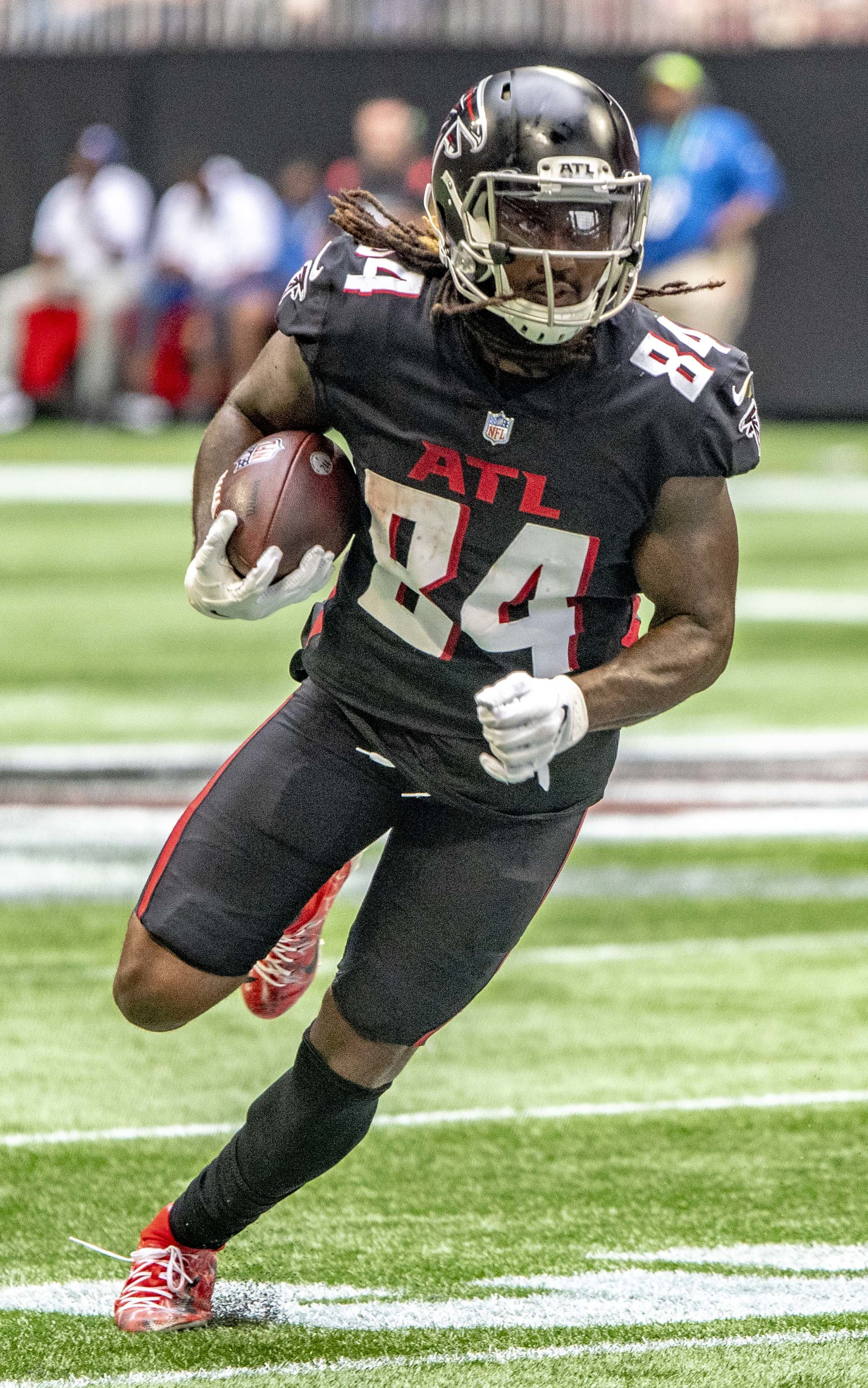
- Patterson with the Atlanta Falcons in 2021

No. 84
- Positions: Running back, kickoff returner, wide receiver

Personal information
- Born: March 17, 1991 (age 35); Rock Hill, South Carolina, U.S.
- Listed height: 6 ft 2 in (1.88 m)
- Listed weight: 220 lb (100 kg)

Career information
- High school: Northwestern (Rock Hill)
- College: Hutchinson (2010–2011); Tennessee (2012)
- NFL draft: 2013: 1st round, 29th overall pick

Career history
- Minnesota Vikings (2013–2016); Oakland Raiders (2017); New England Patriots (2018); Chicago Bears (2019–2020); Atlanta Falcons (2021–2023); Pittsburgh Steelers (2024)

Awards and highlights
- Super Bowl champion (LIII); 4× First-team All-Pro (2013 (Note: Selected as a Return Specialist), 2016 (Note: Selected as a kick returner), 2019 (Note: Selected as a kick returner), 2020 (Note: Selected as a kick returner)); 3× Second-team All-Pro (2015 (Note: Selected as a Return Specialist), 2018 (Note: Selected as a kick returner), 2019 (Note: Selected for Special Teams)); 4× Pro Bowl (2013, 2016, 2019, 2020); 2× NFL kickoff return yards leader (2019, 2020); NFL 2010s All-Decade Team; PFWA All-Rookie Team (2013); First-team All-SEC (2012); 2× NJCAA All-American (2010, 2011); NFL records: 109-yard play (tied); Most career kickoff return touchdowns: 9

Career NFL statistics
- Receptions: 310
- Receiving yards: 2,875
- Rushing yards: 2,646
- Return yards: 8,238
- Total touchdowns: 48
- Stats at Pro Football Reference

Cordarrelle Patterson (/kɔːrˈdɛrəl/ kor-DERR-əl; born March 17, 1991), nicknamed "Flash", is an American professional football running back. As a versatile utility player, he is also a kickoff returner and occasionally a wide receiver. Patterson played college football for the Hutchinson Blue Dragons before transferring to the Tennessee Volunteers, where he earned first-team All-SEC honors.

He was selected by the Minnesota Vikings in the first round of the 2013 NFL draft. Patterson has also been a member of the Oakland Raiders, New England Patriots, Chicago Bears, Atlanta Falcons, and Pittsburgh Steelers.

During a game against the Green Bay Packers in 2013, Patterson tied the NFL record for longest play and set the NFL record for longest kickoff return with 109 yards, the longest possible. He is considered one of the greatest return specialists in NFL history, with a league record nine kickoff return touchdowns in his career, six of which have been longer than 100 yards. On the depth chart for the 2023 season, Patterson was listed under the position "Joker".

== Early life ==
Patterson attended Northwestern High School in Rock Hill, South Carolina, where he played football, basketball, and ran track. He was coached by Jimmy Wallace. As a senior in 2008, Patterson caught 75 passes for 944 yards with 18 touchdowns, leading his team to the State Class 4A Division II championship game, and was named All-state selection. Patterson was also a three-year letterman in track & field at Northwestern High School. He spent part of 2009 beginning a post-graduate year at North Carolina Tech Preparatory Christian Academy, but did not play football, and left prior to the spring to enroll at Hutchinson Community College.

== College career ==
=== Hutchinson Community College ===
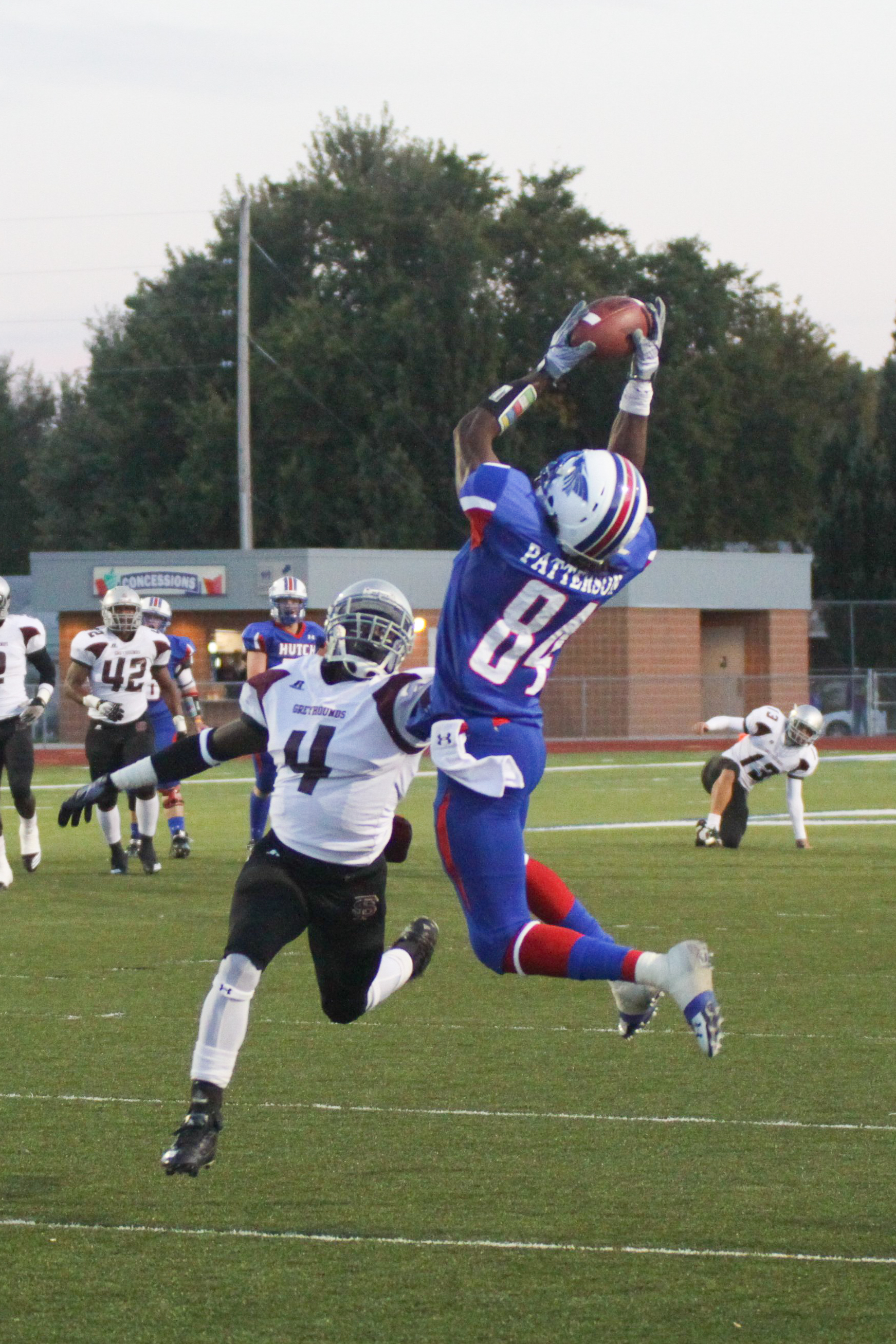
Patterson with Hutchinson in 2010

==== Football ====
In 2010, Patterson transferred to Hutchinson Community College in Hutchinson, Kansas, where he played junior college football and was recognized as a National Junior College Athletic Association (NJCAA) All-American in 2010 and 2011. Patterson holds more than a dozen records at Hutchinson C.C., including career receiving yards (1,832), career receptions (113), career receiving touchdowns (24), career total touchdowns (36), career points (216), career kickoff return average (41.9), and career all-purpose yards (3,379).

In 2011, Patterson was a first-team All-American as a freshman, claiming the honors as a return specialist. He totaled 645 yards on 21 combined kickoff and punt returns with three touchdowns, and also recorded 52 receptions for 908 yards and nine touchdowns.

As a sophomore, Patterson earned first-team All-American honors on offense and was named the 2011 Jayhawk Conference Offensive Player of the Year after catching 61 passes for 924 yards and 15 touchdowns, carrying the ball 32 times for 379 yards and six touchdowns and averaging 48.2 yards on 10 kickoff returns with three more scores.

==== Track and field ====
In addition to football, Patterson competed in track & field, where he clocked personal-bests of 10.33 seconds in the 100-meter dash and 21.19 seconds in the 200-meter dash at the Jayhawk Conference Championship. Patterson also competed in the long jump, and recorded a collegiate-best jump of 6.85 meters (22 ft, 4.5 in) at the Southwestern Invitational Championships. On May 16, the Levelland Meet saw Patterson part of a 4 × 100-meter relay team that timed 40.32 (season-best). At the Lawrence Meet, Patterson helped the sprint medley 1,600-meter unit time in at 3:28.50.

=== Tennessee ===
Patterson was a highly touted recruit in 2012 coming out of Hutchinson Community College. Rated as a 5-star prospect by 247Sports.com and the top JUCO player in the country, he received scholarship offers from upper-tier Division I programs. Patterson ultimately chose to attend the University of Tennessee over LSU, Auburn, Georgia, Ole Miss, and others.

At Tennessee, Patterson played for Derek Dooley and the Tennessee Volunteers football team in 2012. He made an immediate impact with his athletic ability and offensive versatility. Primarily used as a wide receiver, Patterson also excelled as a return specialist and all-purpose running back. In the season opener, a 35–21 victory over North Carolina State in the Chick-fil-A Kickoff Game, he had six receptions for 93 yards and a touchdown to go along with two carries for 72 yards and a touchdown. In the next game, a 51–13 victory over Georgia State, Patterson showed his versatility with three receptions for 71 yards, an 18-yard rush, and three kick returns for 108 net yards. In the following game, a 37–20 loss to the rival Florida Gators, he had eight receptions for 75 yards and a touchdown. After a limited role in the 47–26 victory over the Akron Zips, Patterson had a 46-yard rushing touchdown in a 51–44 shootout loss to the rival Georgia Bulldogs on September 29. In the 55–48 victory over Troy, he had nine receptions for 219 yards and a touchdown. On November 17, in a 41–18 loss to rival Vanderbilt, he had an 81-yard punt return for a touchdown. In the regular season finale against the Kentucky Wildcats, he had four receptions for 88 yards and a touchdown in the 37–17 victory. Despite Tennessee's disappointing 5–7 record in the 2012 season, Patterson scored at least one touchdown by reception, rush, kick return, and punt return, with 10 total touchdowns in 12 games. In 12 starts, Patterson racked up a school-record 1,858 all-purpose yards (set by Reggie Cobb in 1987) to rank first in the Southeastern Conference, tied for 18th in NCAA.

On January 9, 2013, Patterson, along with college teammates Tyler Bray, Justin Hunter, and Darrington Sentimore, announced his intention to leave college early and declare for the 2013 NFL draft.

== Professional career ==
Pre-draft measurables
Height	Weight	Arm length	Hand span	40-yard dash	10-yard split	20-yard split	20-yard shuttle	Three-cone drill	Vertical jump	Broad jump	Wonderlic
6 ft 1 7/8 in (1.88 m)	216 lb (98 kg)	31 3/4 in (0.81 m)	9 in (0.23 m)	4.42 s	1.60 s	2.61 s	4.40 s	7.28 s	37 in (0.94 m)	10 ft 8 in (3.25 m)	11
All results from NFL Combine/Pro Day

=== Minnesota Vikings ===
==== 2013 season ====
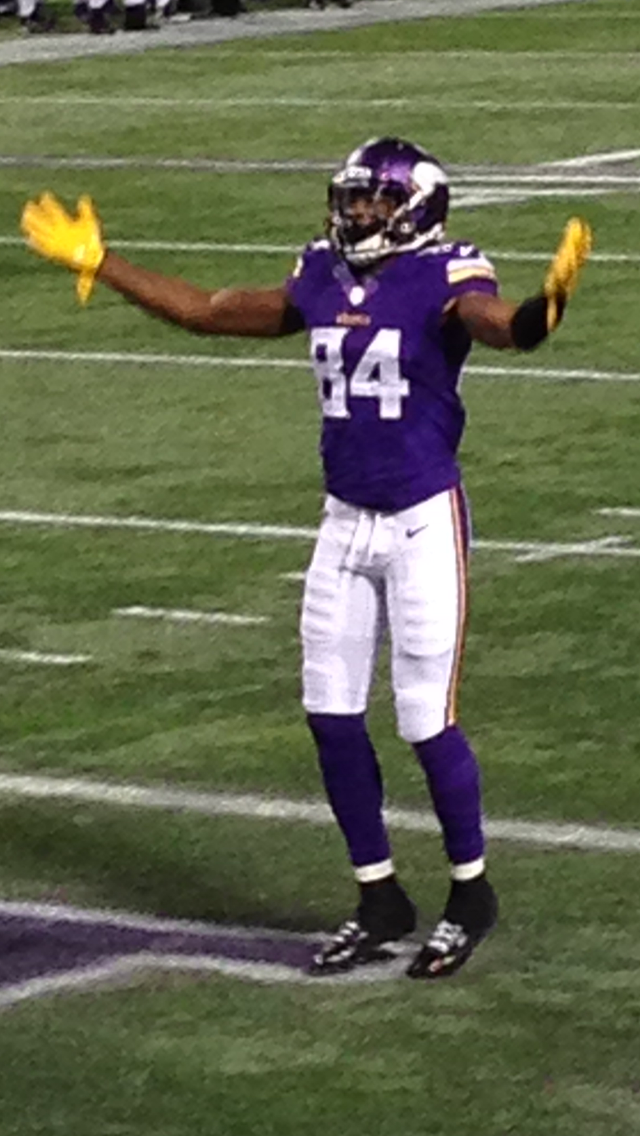
Patterson in 2013

Patterson was selected by the Minnesota Vikings of the National Football League (NFL) in the first round with the 29th overall pick in the 2013 NFL draft in a draft-day trade with the New England Patriots; the Patriots received four draft picks (a second, third, fourth and seventh).

In the season-opener on September 8, Patterson caught his first NFL pass from quarterback Christian Ponder for a 10-yard gain and had two kicks returned for 54 yards. In Patterson's second career game against the Chicago Bears on September 15, he scored his first NFL career touchdown by returning the opening kickoff for a 105-yard kick return touchdown, marking the first kickoff return touchdown the Bears had allowed since September 30, 2007. For his outstanding performance on special teams during the month of September, Patterson was honored as the National Football Conference (NFC) Special Teams Player of the Month. In Week 8, Patterson returned the opening kickoff 109 yards for a touchdown, tying the NFL record for the longest play ever. After Patterson's performance against the Green Bay Packers, he was named NFC Special Teams Player of the Week. On November 7, Patterson caught his first touchdown pass on a two-yard reception. On December 1, Patterson ran a touchdown for 33 yards, helping the Vikings win in overtime over the Bears. Patterson's best receiving performance of the season came in Week 14 against the Baltimore Ravens with five catches for 141 yards; in that game, he scored his longest receiving touchdown when he took a bubble screen pass from Matt Cassel 79 yards to the end zone with just 45 seconds remaining in the fourth quarter. In the season finale victory against the Detroit Lions on December 29, he scored the final two Vikings touchdowns at the Metrodome. The first of them came on a 50-yard run in the first quarter, and then he added an eight-yard reception with 9:19 left in the game. The rushing touchdown set a team record for the longest rushing touchdown by a Vikings receiver.

Patterson finished his rookie year with 45 receptions for 469 yards and four touchdowns while also returning 43 kicks for 1,393 yards and two touchdowns in 16 games and six starts. He was named to the PFWA All-Rookie Team. On January 2, 2014, Patterson was selected to play in the Pro Bowl, filling in for Antonio Brown. The next day, Patterson was named as a starter on the 2013 Associated Press (AP) All-Pro team as the kick returner.

==== 2014 season ====
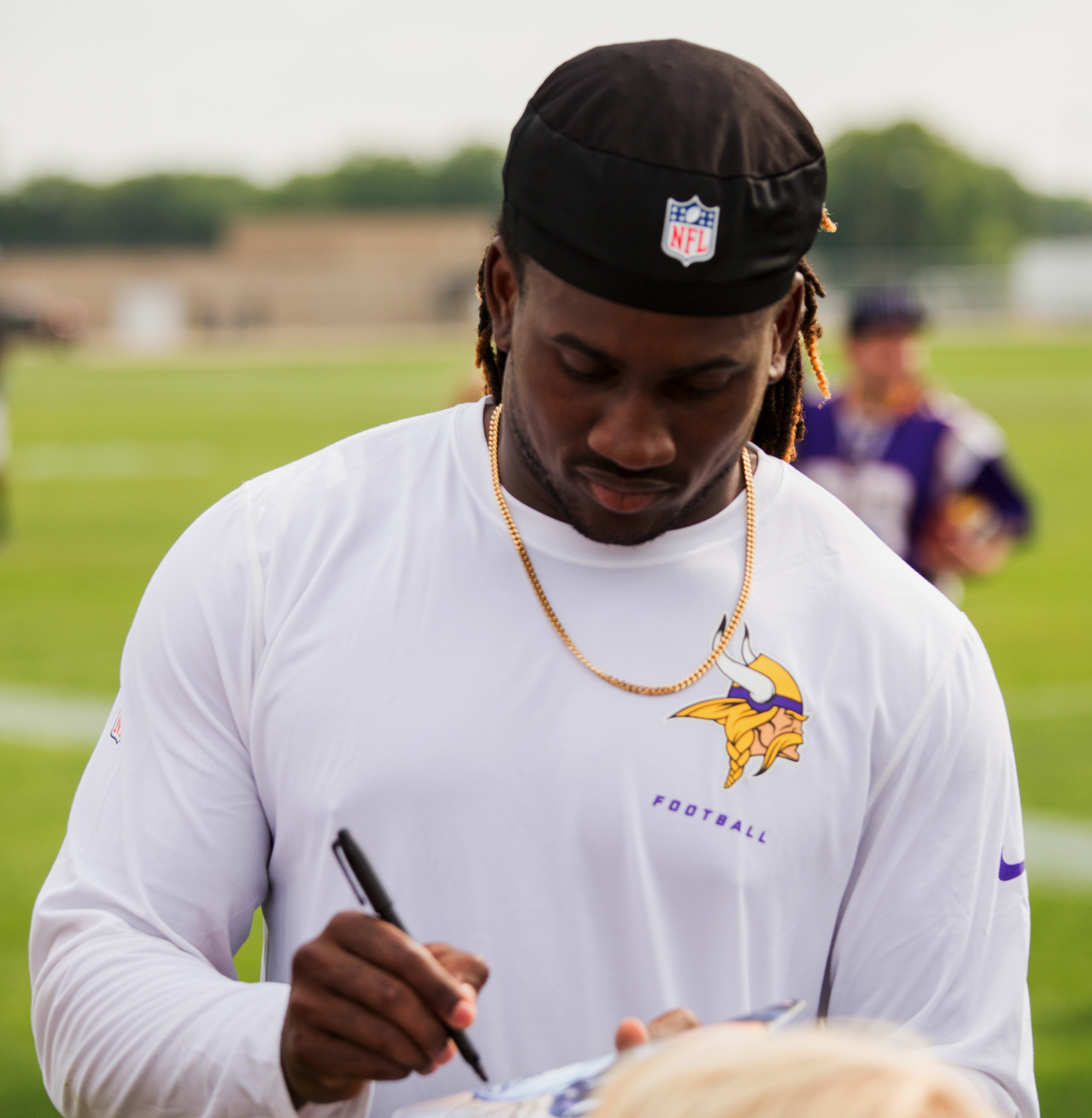
Patterson signing autographs during training camp in 2014

Patterson suffered through a disappointing 2014 season under new head coach Mike Zimmer and offensive coordinator Norv Turner. The team drafted rookie quarterback Teddy Bridgewater in 2014, but Bridgewater and Patterson failed to create any chemistry. The second-year receiver caught only 33 passes for 384 yards and a touchdown. His return yards also plummeted. Patterson ended up losing his starting job to Charles Johnson, a practice squad player the team picked up from the Cleveland Browns. Johnson was drafted the same year as Patterson in the seventh round by the Packers. By the end of the 2014 season, Patterson went from starter to fourth on the team's depth chart.

==== 2015 season ====
Patterson had an opportunity to reacquire his starting position after veteran wide receiver Greg Jennings was released during the off-season. After newly signed veteran Mike Wallace established himself as the starter and rookie Stefon Diggs emerged as a premier receiver in Charles Johnson's absence, Patterson was dropped to fifth position and relegated to return duties. He received minimal play at wide receiver throughout the season, only amounting two receptions for 10 yards all season. However, Patterson had two kick return touchdowns, the first in Week 10 against the Oakland Raiders and the second in Week 13 against the Seattle Seahawks.

==== 2016 season ====
In 2016, Patterson struggled as a receiver but remained a successful kick returner. He was named to his second Pro Bowl and second First-team All-Pro, both as a returner. Overall, Patterson played in 16 games (eight starts) and recorded 52 receptions for 453 yards and two touchdowns while also returning 25 kicks for 792 yards and a return touchdown, which came against the Arizona Cardinals in Week 11.

=== Oakland Raiders ===
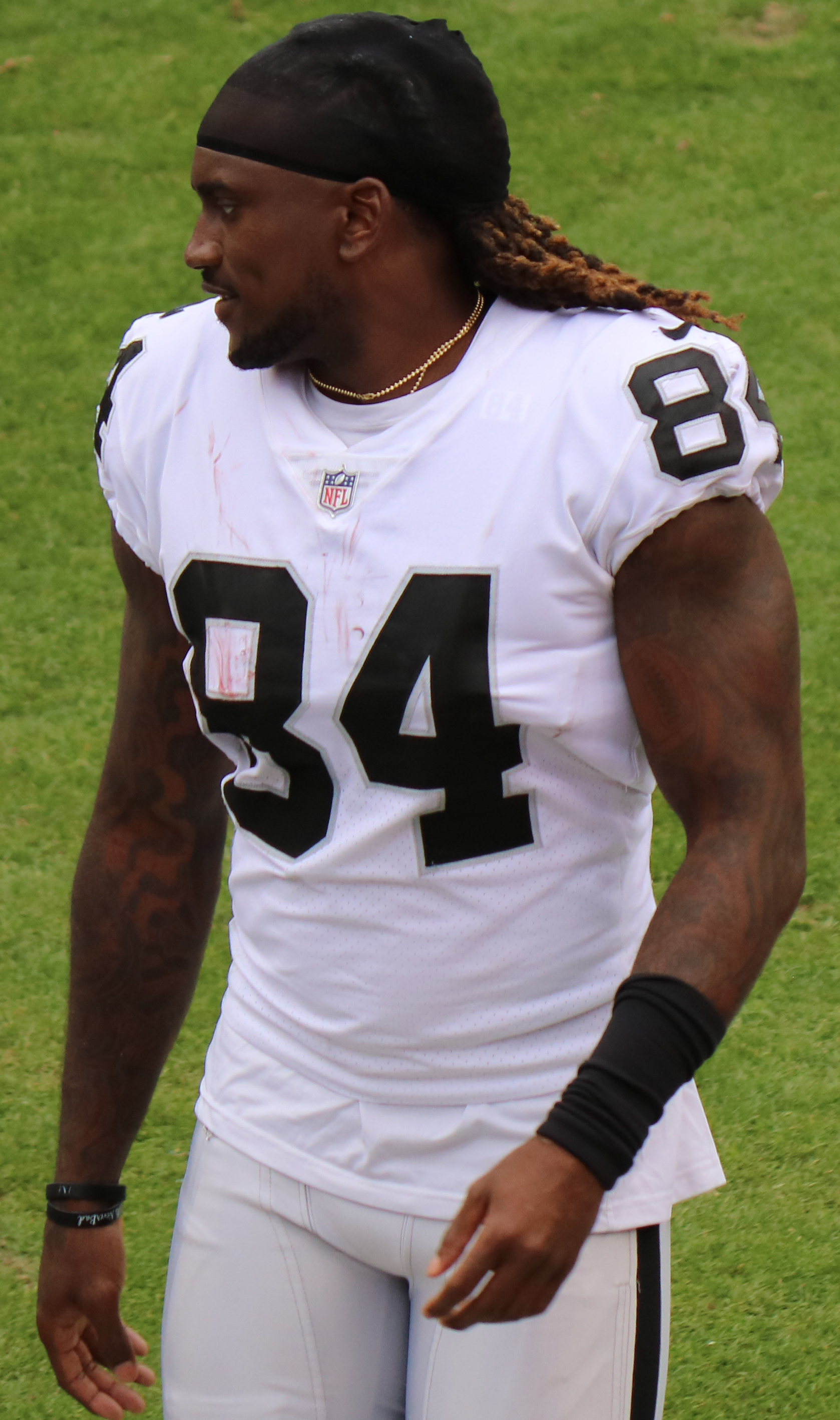
Patterson in 2017

On March 13, 2017, Patterson signed a two-year, $8.5 million contract with the Raiders. He joined a position unit that contained Michael Crabtree, Amari Cooper, Seth Roberts, and Johnny Holton.

On September 10, 2017, in the season opener against the Tennessee Titans, Patterson had one rush for five yards and one reception for two yards and served as the kickoff returner in his Raiders debut. The Raiders won on the road by a score of 26–16. In the next game against the New York Jets, Patterson had three carries for 57 yards and a 43-yard touchdown to go along with a six-yard reception and 70 return yards during the 45–20 victory. During Week 6, he had a 47-yard rushing touchdown as the Raiders narrowly lost to the Los Angeles Chargers by a score of 17–16.

Patterson finished the 2017 season with 31 receptions for 309 yards to go along with 13 carries for 121 yards and two touchdowns and 19 returns for 538 yards in 16 games and two starts.

=== New England Patriots ===
On March 18, 2018, the Raiders agreed to trade Patterson and a 2018 sixth-round pick to the Patriots for a 2018 fifth-round pick. The deal became official two days later.

Patterson made his Patriots debut in the season opener against the Houston Texans, recording a six-yard reception, 13 rushing yards, and 19 return yards during the 27–20 victory. Three weeks later against the Miami Dolphins, he scored his first touchdown as a Patriot on a 55-yard reception. Patterson finished the 38–7 victory with three receptions for 54 yards and an 11-yard carry.

During a Week 7 38–31 road victory over the Bears, Patterson fumbled the ball early in the game but later returned a 95-yard kick return for a touchdown. He finished the game with four returns for 179 yards along with a four-yard carry. Two weeks later against the Packers, the injury-depleted Patriots used Patterson as their backup running back behind James White. Coming out of the tailback position, Patterson led the team in rushing, gaining 61 yards on 11 carries and scoring a touchdown in the 31–17 victory.

Patterson finished the season playing in 15 games (five starts) recording 21 receptions for 247 yards and three touchdowns to go along with 42 carries for 228 yards and a touchdown. He also returned 23 kicks for 663 yards and a touchdown. The Patriots finished atop the AFC East with an 11–5 record and earned the #2-seed for the American Football Conference (AFC) Playoffs. Patterson appeared in his first playoff game since the 2015 season with the Vikings. In the Divisional Round against the Chargers, Patterson had a three-yard rush and a 23-yard kick return in the 41–28 victory. During the AFC Championship Game, he had two receptions for 18 yards and returned three kicks for 80 yards in the 37–31 overtime road victory over the Kansas City Chiefs. Patterson had two receptions for 14 yards, a 38-yard kick return, and seven rushing yards as the Patriots defeated the Los Angeles Rams by a score of 13–3 in Super Bowl LIII.

=== Chicago Bears ===
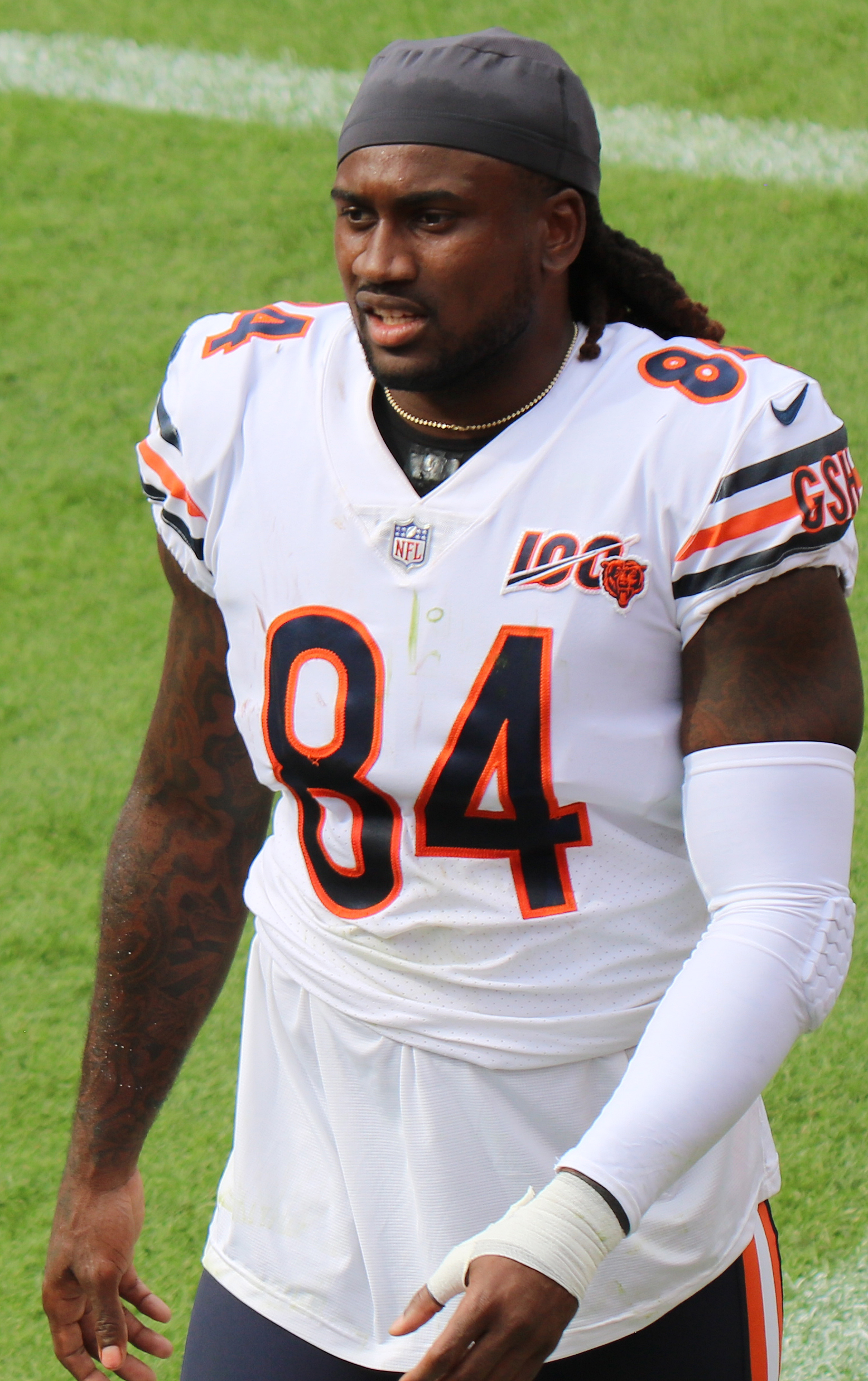
Patterson in 2019

==== 2019 season ====
On March 13, 2019, Patterson signed a two-year, $10 million contract with the Bears.

Patterson made his Bears debut in the season-opener against the Packers, rushing once for −2 yards and caught a three-yard reception as the Bears lost 10–3. During Week 7 against the New Orleans Saints, Patterson recorded a 102-yard kickoff return for a touchdown in the 36–25 loss.

In November, Patterson recorded 294 kickoff return yards on 10 attempts and four tackles as a gunner on punts. For his performance, Patterson was named NFC Special Teams Player of the Month for the second time in his career, while he was the first Bears player to win the award since Devin Hester in October 2011.

On December 17, 2019, Patterson was voted into the 2020 Pro Bowl roster as a starter; at the time, he led the NFC in kickoff return average with 29.6 yards per return. At the end of the season, Patterson was named first-team All-Pro as a kick returner and second-team All-Pro as a special teamer. He finished the year with the NFL's most kick return yards (825), while his yards per return (29.5) led the NFC and was second in the league. Patterson's 29.9 kickoff return average was also the second-highest in Bears' franchise history behind Gale Sayers.

==== 2020 season ====
During a Week 10 19–13 loss to his former team, the Vikings, on Monday Night Football, Patterson tied the NFL record for the most kickoff return touchdowns in a career when he returned the second half opening kickoff for a 104-yard score that gave the Bears the lead. The touchdown also set the franchise record for the longest kickoff return in team history, surpassing Sayers' 103-yard score in 1967.

On December 21, 2020, Patterson was named as an All-Pro to the Pro Bowl for the second consecutive season. At the time of the roster reveal, he led the league in kickoff returns (32) and yards per return (29.4). On the season, Patterson totaled the most rushing attempts and rushing yards in his career, at 64 attempts and 232 yards respectively.

=== Atlanta Falcons ===
==== 2021 season ====
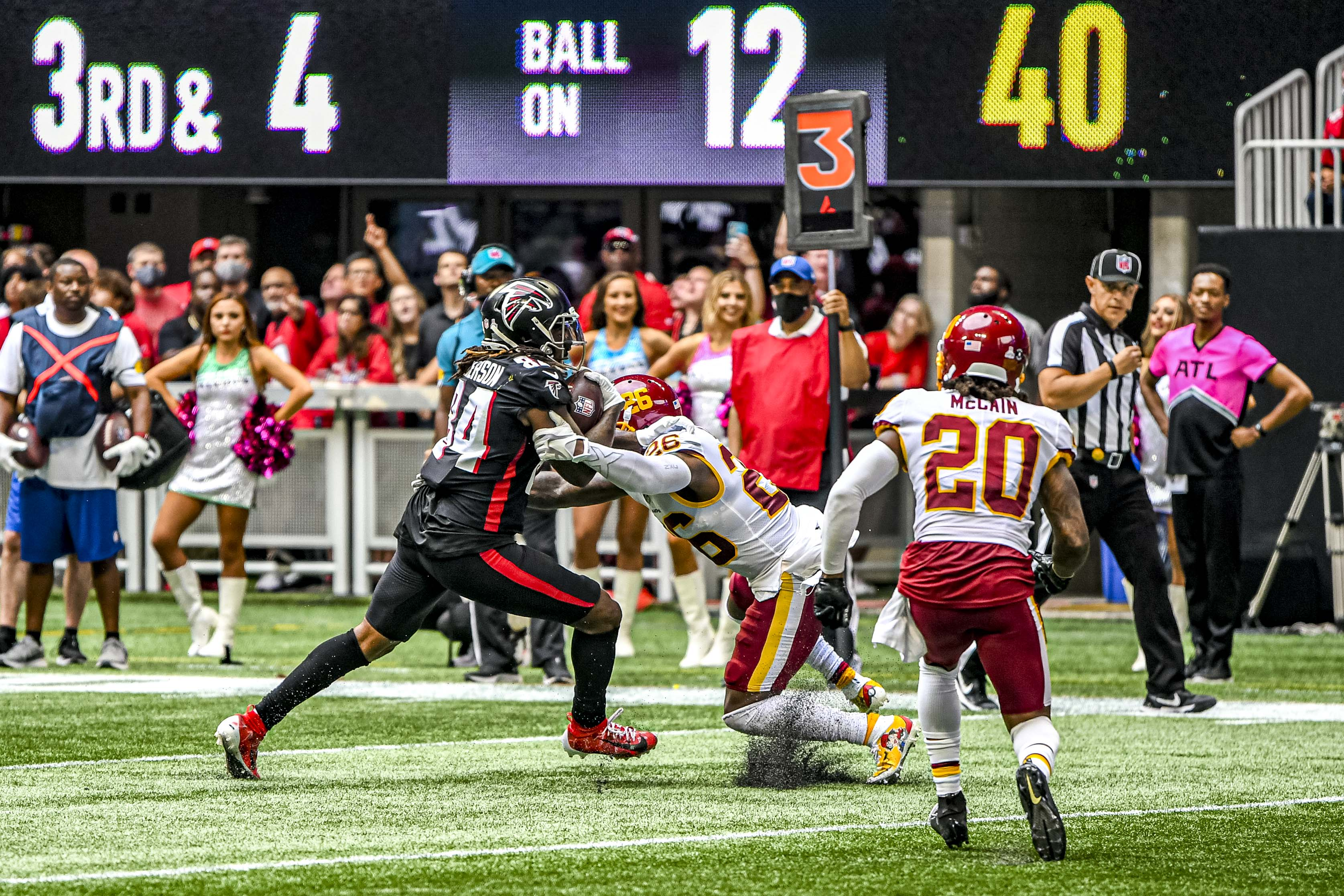
Patterson in 2021

On April 15, 2021, Patterson signed a one-year, $3 million contract with the Atlanta Falcons.

During a Week 2 48–25 road loss to the Tampa Bay Buccaneers, Patterson had seven carries for 11 yards and a touchdown, and five receptions for 58 yards and a touchdown. In the next game against the New York Giants, he caught six passes for 86 yards during the 17–14 victory. The following week against the Washington Football Team, Patterson recorded three receiving touchdowns, a career high.

During Week 5 against the Jets in London, Patterson had 54 rushing yards and 60 receiving yards, while also attempting his first career pass in the 27–20 victory. Following a Week 6 bye, the Falcons returned home to face the Dolphins. Patterson rushed for 60 yards and a touchdown in the narrow 30–28 victory. Two weeks later against the Saints, Patterson had six receptions for 126 yards, including a 64-yard catch at the end of the game that put the Falcons in range for a game-winning field goal.

After suffering an injury in Week 10 against the Dallas Cowboys, Patterson returned two weeks later against the Jacksonville Jaguars, where he recorded 108 rushing yards and two rushing touchdowns, both career-highs. Patterson also made his first appearance on defense for the Falcons, playing one down at safety during a Hail Mary attempt. After the game, the Falcons added him to the depth chart as the third-string safety.

Patterson finished the 2021 season with 153 carries for 618 yards, 52 receptions for 548 yards, and 11 total touchdowns, all career-highs. Patterson was ranked 73rd by his fellow players on the NFL Top 100 Players of 2022.

==== 2022 season ====
On March 22, 2022, Patterson re-signed with the Falcons for a two-year, $10.5 million contract. He entered the 2022 season as the Falcons’ starting running back.

Patterson started the 2022 season with 22 carries for 120 yards and a touchdown in a narrow 27–26 loss to the Saints. Two weeks later against the Seahawks, he had 17 carries for 141 yards and a touchdown in the 27–23 victory. He was named NFC Offensive Player of the Week for this game. He was placed on injured reserve on October 3, 2022, after aggravating a knee injury in Week 4. Patterson's designated to return from injured reserve on November 2. He was activated from injured reserve three days later. In his return against the Chargers, Patterson had two rushing touchdowns.

On November 20, Patterson recorded a 103-yard kickoff return for a touchdown against the Bears in the 27–24 victory; his ninth kickoff return for a touchdown, the most in NFL history. Patterson finished the 2022 season with 144 carries for 695 yards and eight touchdowns to go along with 21 receptions for 122 yards in 13 games.

==== 2023 season ====
Patterson appeared in 14 games in the 2023 season but fell to third on the running back depth chart behind rookie Bijan Robinson and Tyler Allgeier. He scored a receiving touchdown in Week 15 against the Panthers.

=== Pittsburgh Steelers ===
==== 2024 season ====
On April 1, 2024, Patterson signed with the Pittsburgh Steelers on a two-year contract.

As the team's third-string running back in 2024, Patterson often caught pitches behind the line of scrimmage. He was described by the team as being a "a hard-nosed runner" who also "has the agility to make defenders miss". Though primarily used as a running back, Patterson subbed in at wide receiver as well as the team's kick returner for much of the season.

Patterson finished the regular season with 12 receptions on 14 targets for 80 yards and a touchdown. He also recorded 32 rushes for 135 yards. The Steelers finished with a 10–7 record and earned a playoff berth as the #6-seed in the AFC. During the Wild Card Round against to the Baltimore Ravens, Patterson did not play an offensive down in the 28–14 road loss.

On July 28, 2025, Patterson was released by the Steelers.

== Career statistics ==
Legend
	Won the Super Bowl
	NFL record
	Led the league
**Bold**	Career high

=== NFL ===
==== Regular season ====
Year	Team	Games		Receiving					Rushing					Kick returns					Fumbles	
Year	Team	GP	GS	Rec	Yds	Avg	Lng	TD	Att	Yds	Avg	Lng	TD	Ret	Yds	Avg	Lng	TD	Fum	Lost
2013	MIN	16	6	45	469	10.4	**79T**	4	12	158	**13.2**	50T	3	**43**	**1,393**	**32.4**	**109T**	**2**	0	0
2014	MIN	16	7	33	384	11.6	28	1	10	117	11.7	**67T**	1	34	871	25.6	51	0	1	**1**
2015	MIN	16	1	2	10	5.0	9	0	2	15	7.5	9	0	32	1,019	31.8	101T	**2**	1	**1**
2016	MIN	16	8	52	453	8.7	30	2	7	43	6.1	22	0	25	792	31.7	104T	1	2	0
2017	OAK	16	2	31	309	10.0	59	0	13	121	9.3	47T	2	19	538	28.3	49	0	**3**	0
2018	NE	15	5	21	247	**11.8**	55T	3	42	228	5.4	27	1	23	663	28.8	95T	1	1	**1**
2019	CHI	16	4	11	83	7.5	33	0	17	103	6.1	46	0	28	825	29.5	102T	1	0	0
2020	CHI	16	3	21	132	6.3	25	0	64	232	3.6	13	1	35	1,017	29.1	104T	1	0	0
2021	ATL	16	13	**52**	**548**	10.5	64	**5**	**153**	618	4.0	39	6	18	434	24.1	32	0	2	0
2022	ATL	13	11	21	122	5.8	16	0	144	**695**	4.8	40	**8**	9	284	31.6	103T	1	1	**1**
2023	ATL	14	0	9	38	4.2	11	1	50	181	3.6	18	0	7	153	21.9	29	0	1	0
2024	PIT	13	1	12	80	6.7	20	1	32	135	4.2	14	0	11	240	21.8	33	0	1	**1**
Career		183	61	310	2,875	9.3	79T	17	546	2,646	4.8	67T	22	284	8,229	29.0	109T	9	13	5

==== Postseason ====
Year	Team	Games		Receiving					Rushing					Kick returns					Fumbles	
Year	Team	GP	GS	Rec	Yds	Avg	Lng	TD	Att	Yds	Avg	Lng	TD	Ret	Yds	Avg	Lng	TD	Fum	Lost
2015	MIN	1	0	0	0	0.0	0	0	0	0	0.0	0	0	3	65	21.7	34	0	0	0
2018	NE	3	0	**4**	**32**	**8.0**	**15**	0	**3**	**10**	**3.3**	**6**	0	**5**	**141**	28.2	38	0	0	0
2020	CHI	1	0	0	0	0.0	0	0	1	2	2.0	0	0	2	68	**34.0**	**42**	0	0	0
2024	PIT	1	0	0	0	0.0	0	0	0	0	0.0	0	0	1	26	26.0	26	0	0	0
Career		6	0	4	32	8.0	15	0	4	12	3.0	6	0	11	300	27.3	42	0	0	0

=== College ===
Season	Team	GP	Rushing				Receiving				Returning			
Season	Team	GP	Att	Yds	Avg	TD	Rec	Yds	Avg	TD	Ret	Yds	Avg	TD
2010	Hutchinson CC	11	7	19	2.7	0	52	908	**17.5**	9	21	645	30.7	**3**
2011	Hutchinson CC	12	**32**	**379**	11.8	**6**	**61**	**924**	15.1	**15**	10	482	**48.2**	**3**
2012	Tennessee	12	25	308	**12.3**	3	46	778	16.9	5	**29**	**772**	26.6	2
Total		35	64	706	11.0	9	159	2,610	16.4	29	60	1,899	31.6	8

== Career highlights ==
=== Awards and honors ===
NFL

- Super Bowl champion (LIII)
- 4× First-team All-Pro (2013, 2016, 2019, 2020)
- 3× Second-team All-Pro (2015, 2018, 2019)
- 4× Pro Bowl (2013, 2016, 2019, 2020)
- 2× NFL kickoff return yards leader (2019, 2020)
- NFL 2010s All-Decade Team
- PFWA All-Rookie Team (2013)
- Ranked No. 73 in the Top 100 Players of 2022

College

- First-team All-SEC (2012)
- 2× NJCAA All-American (2010, 2011)

=== Records ===
==== NFL records ====
- Most kickoff return touchdowns in NFL history: 9
- Longest kickoff return touchdown: 109 yards (October 27, 2013)
- First NFL player to have a 100-yard kickoff return touchdown, a 75-yard touchdown catch, and a 50-yard rushing touchdown in the same season (2013)

==== Vikings franchise records ====
- First wide receiver to rush for 100 yards in a game: 102 yards (September 7, 2014)
- Longest rushing touchdown by a wide receiver: 67 yards (September 7, 2014)
- Most kickoff return yards in a season: 1,393 (2013)
- Most kickoff return yards in a season by a rookie: 1,393 (2013)
- Highest kick return average in a season: 32.4 (2013)
- Highest kick return average in a career: 29.6 (2013–present)
- Most kickoff return touchdowns in a season: 2 (2013) (tied with Percy Harvin)
- Longest play: 109 yards (October 27, 2013)
- Most games with 100 kick return yards: 13
- Most kick return yards in a career: 4,040
- Most special teams touchdowns in franchise history: 5 (tied with Marcus Sherels)

== Personal life ==
Patterson was raised by his mother, Catherine, and has two siblings: Charles and Crystal.

Patterson has four children. He married his wife, Taylor Quick, in July 2024. They lost a son during pregnancy in 2017; in December 2021, Patterson wore cleats in support of pregnancy and infant loss awareness.

In October 2026, Patterson was arrested for domestic assault.
