= Hutchinson Community College =

Public college in Hutchinson, Kansas, US

- Former names: Hutchinson Junior College (1928–1965); Hutchinson Community Junior College (1965–1980); Hutchinson Community College (1980–1993); Hutchinson Community College and Area Vocational School (1993–2012)
- Type: Public community college
- Established: 1928; 98 years ago
- Parent institution: Kansas Board of Regents
- Accreditation: HLC
- President: Dr. Tricia Paramore
- Academic staff: 269 (2020)
- Administrative staff: 385 (2020)
- Students: 5,070 (Fall 2023)
- Location: Hutchinson, Kansas, United States; 38.069192°N 97.920282°W
- Newspaper: The Hutchinson Collegian
- Academic term: Semester
- Colors: Scarlet & Blue
- Nickname: Blue Dragons
- Sporting affiliations: NJCAA Division I; KJCCC
- Mascot: Duke the Dragon
- Website: hutchcc.edu

Hutchinson Community College (HutchCC or HCC) is a public community college in Hutchinson, Kansas. It serves nearly 5,000 credit students every semester.

== History ==
The college was established in the spring of 1928 as Hutchinson Junior College, and held its first classes that fall. On July 1, 1965, the name was changed to Hutchinson Community Junior College, then in 1980 to Hutchinson Community College.

On July 1, 1993, Hutchinson Community College was renamed once again to Hutchinson Community College and Area Vocational School after a merger with the local vocational school. In 2012, the vocational school addition was removed, and the institution finally became known as Hutchinson Community College.

== Campuses ==
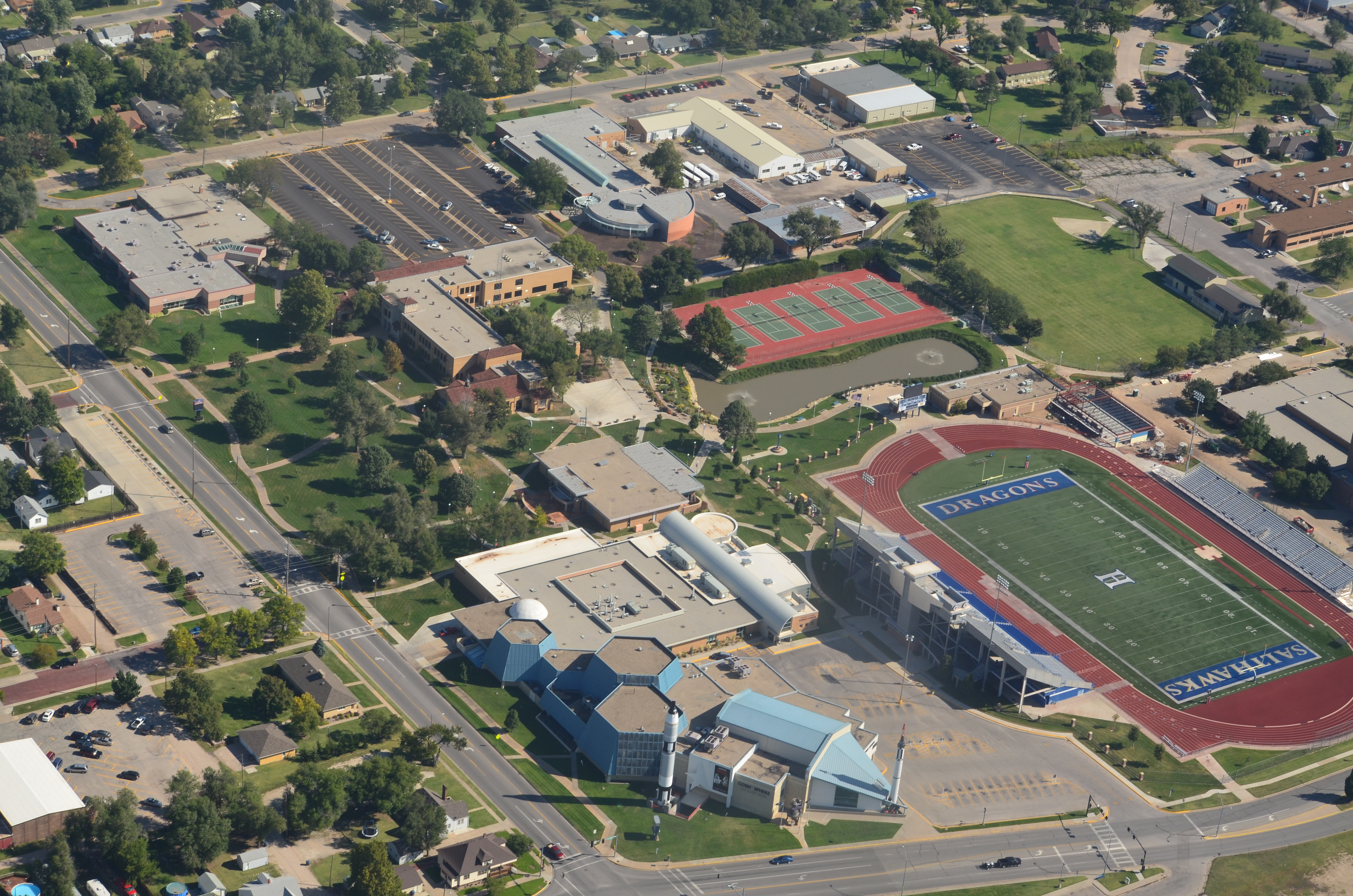
Hutchinson Community College and Cosmosphere (2014)

The main campus is located at 1300 North Plum in Hutchinson, Kansas, and mostly bounded between the streets of 11th Street, 14th Street, and Plum Street. There are additional locations within Hutchinson that house the College's Agriculture, Fire Science, Allied Health, Cosmetology and Barbering programs.

HutchCC has two satellite locations, in McPherson, Kansas and Newton, Kansas.

== Academics ==
Students can choose from more than 70 different academic programs, leading to Associate of Arts, Associate of Science, Associate of General Studies and Associate of Fine Arts degrees. Hutchinson Community College has transfer and articulation agreements with every Kansas Regents university and college, as well as a variety of other institutions across the country.

The college also offers over 50 technical programs.

== Athletics ==
The Hutchinson Blue Dragons are the sports teams of Hutchinson Community College. They participate in the National Junior College Athletic Association (NJCAA) and in the Kansas Jayhawk Community College Conference.

== Notable alumni ==
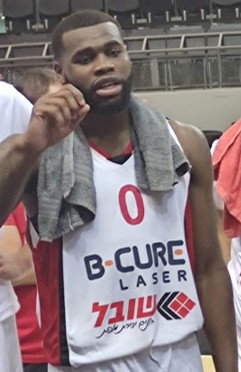
Kadeem Allen

- Kadeem Allen (born 1993), professional basketball player
- De'Vondre Campbell, professional football player
- Andy Dirks (born 1986), professional baseball player
- Gerald Everett, professional football player
- Steve Fritz (born 1967), 1996 Olympic decathlete
- Markus Golden, professional football player
- Shaun Hill, former professional football player
- Storey Jackson, professional football player
- Darius Johnson-Odom, professional basketball player
- Alvin Kamara (born 1995), professional football player
- Jeremiah Ledbetter, professional football player
- Martina McBride, country music singer-songwriter
- Andre Morris (born 1972), sprint runner
- Cordarrelle Patterson, professional football player
- Mike Zagurski, professional baseball pitcher
- Devonte Wyatt, professional football player

== See also ==
- Hutchinson Sports Arena
- Cosmosphere space museum
- Radio Kansas public radio network
