= Pratt County Courthouse (Kansas) =

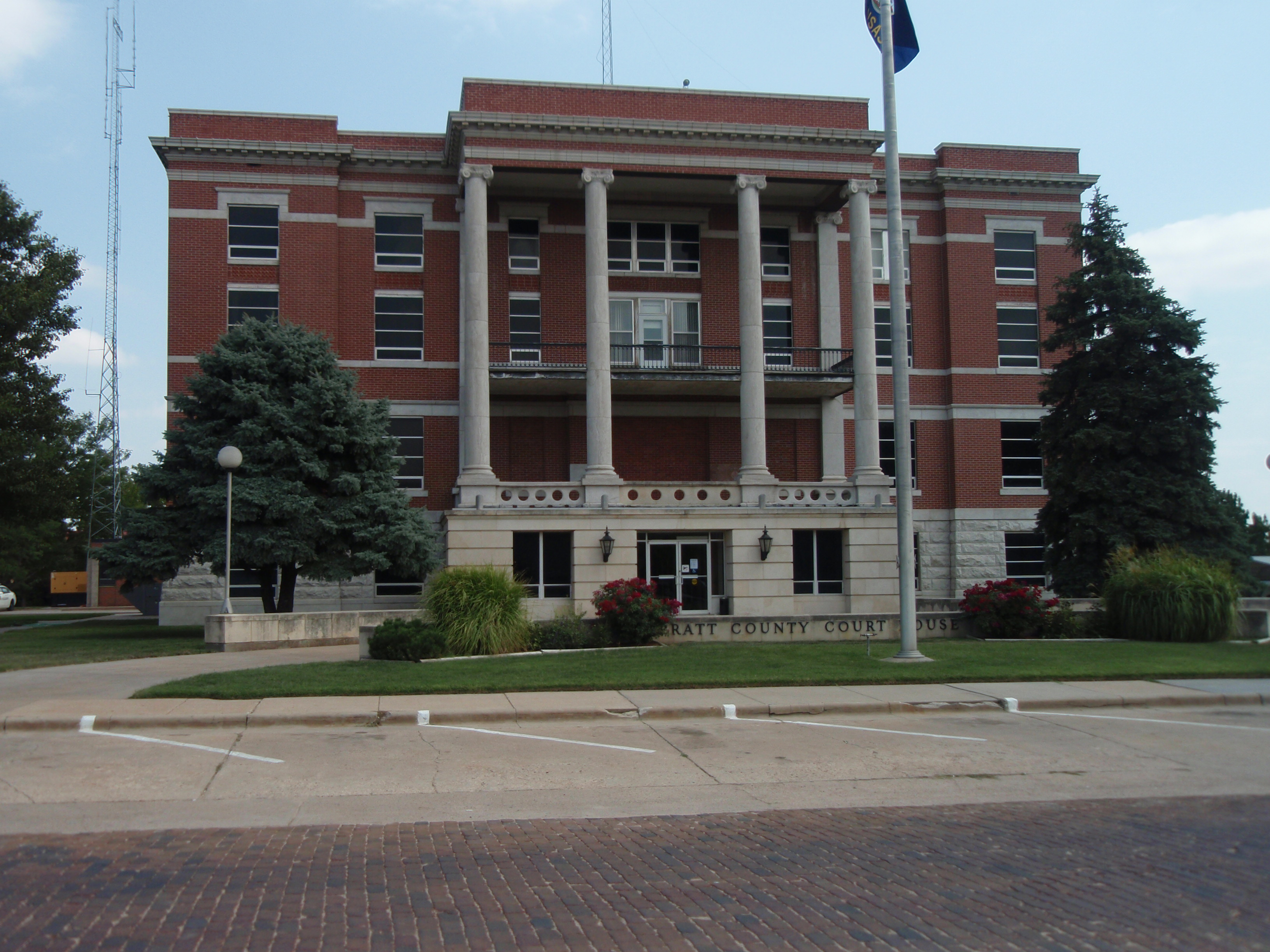

- Location within Kansas Location within the United States

General information
- Architectural style: Classical Revival
- Location: 300 South Ninnescah Street, Pratt, Kansas
- Coordinates: 37°38′36″N 98°44′15″W
- Construction started: 1909
- Completed: 1910

Design and construction
- Architects: George P. Washburn & Son; Mann & Company
- Main contractor: Randall & Smith

The Pratt County Courthouse, located at 300 South Ninnescah Street in Pratt, is the seat of government of Pratt County, Kansas. Pratt has been the county seat since 1888. The courthouse was built from 1909 to 1910 by Randall & Smith. Architects Mann & Company of Hutchinson, Kansas, were hired to extensively remodel the building after a 1923 fire.

George P. Washburn & Son of Ottawa, Kansas designed the courthouse in the Classical Revival style. The courthouse is located on spacious landscaped grounds, four stories, and faces west. It is constructed of red-colored brick and white limestone with a flat roof. The front has a large porch which is supported by four Ionic columns rising from the second story to the top of the fourth story. The first story is entirely faced with limestone. Balconies are accessible on the second and third stories. The courthouse and separate jail located behind it were built for a total of $101,399.31. On June 6, 1923, the roof and top two floors of the courthouse were destroyed by fire; lightning was believed to be the cause. Following an inspection, it was determined to be structurally sound. Mann & Company performed the remodel at an estimated cost of $50,000 to $60,000.

The first courthouse was located in the Peoples Bank on Main Street.

George P. Washburn & Sons also designed courthouses in Anderson County, Atchison County, Butler County, Chautauqua County, Doniphan County, Franklin County, Harper County, Kingman County, Miami County, Woodson County, and Beaver County in Oklahoma.

Mann & Company also designed courthouses in Ellis County, Ellsworth County, Graham County, Lane County, Republic County, Scott County, Stafford County, and Stevens County.

== See also ==
- List of county courthouses in Kansas
