= Hutchinson Sports Arena =

Arena in Kansas, United States

- "the old barn"
- Interactive map of Hutchinson Sports Arena
- Location: 720 East 11th Ave; Hutchinson, Kansas 67501
- Coordinates: 38°3′56″N 97°54′58″W
- Owner: City of Hutchinson
- Operator: Hutchinson Community College
- Capacity: 6,500

Construction
- Opened: 1952
- Renovated: 2016
- Architects: Mann & Company (1952); SJCF Architecture (2016)

Tenants
- Hutchinson Blue Dragons (1952–present); Hutchinson Salthawks (1952–2002); NJCAA Men's Basketball Tournament (1952–present); KSHSAA 3A State Basketball Tournament

Hutchinson Sports Arena is a 6,500-seat multi-purpose arena in Hutchinson, Kansas, United States. It is located a few blocks east of Plum Street on the north side of 11th Street on the campus of Hutchinson Community College. The arena hosts local sporting events and concerts.

== History ==
The building was opened in 1952. Though owned by the City of Hutchinson, the arena is run and maintained by Hutchinson Community College, as well as Hutchinson Recreation Commission (Hutch Rec), who oversees several programs, activities, and events in the auxiliary gyms as well as the community walking program.

The building was designed by Mann & Company, local architects.

The NJCAA Men's Basketball Championship has been held at the arena since it first opened.

=== Renovation project ===
In 2013, the NJCAA expressed concerns to the City of Hutchinson about the facility and what could be done to improve the overall tournament experience. A steering committee was created to explore improvements to the aging building. In 2014, the city solicited a request from architectural consultants for improvements, and hired the firm of SJCF Architecture. The preliminary plans were presented by the architects to the City Council in December 2014.

In 2015, Hutchinson voters approved a 0.35% tax increase to update the arena with $29.5 million improvements. The tax took effect in July 2015 and would remain in place for about 10 years. Hutchinson Community College pledged $4.5 million for the project. In 2016, the NJCAA signed a 25-year contract to hold the NJCAA Division I Men's Basketball Championship at the arena until 2041.

The estimated $29.5 million improvements included: community gyms & running track, weight training & sports medicine room, locker and team areas, drop-off plaza and new entrances, lobby & ticketing, concessions & food service areas, restrooms & elevators, offices, club areas and conference rooms, landscaped parking facilities. Project Scope and Cost Estimates: South Spectator Addition - $8,885,147, North Athletic Addition - $13,243,832, Renovation of Existing Facility - $7,294,686, Total Project Cost - $29,423,664. The construction occurred in two phases and took approximately 1.5 to 2 years. The renovation was completed in 2016 in time for the 2016-17 basketball season.

== Sports ==
=== College ===
The arena is the home of Hutchinson Community College men's and women's basketball and volleyball teams (Hutchinson Blue Dragons).

Each March, the arena hosts the National Junior College Athletic Association (NJCAA) men's basketball championship tournament. In 1948, the first NJCAA basketball tournament was played in Springfield, Missouri. In 1949, the tournament was moved to Hutchinson, then later played at the Hutchinson Sports Arena after it was built.

=== High school ===
Every year, the arena hosts the Kansas State High School Activities Association (KSHSAA) boys and girls 3A state basketball tournaments.

Previously, the arena hosted Hutchinson High School varsity basketball until the SaltHawk Athletic Center was constructed across the street in about 2002.

== See also ==
- Cosmosphere space museum, 2 blocks west of arena
