= Dodge City Civic Center =

Sporting and event venue in Kansas

Coordinates: 37.7700702°N 100.0174177°W

The Dodge City Civic Center is a 2,500-seat multi-purpose arena in Dodge City, Kansas. It was home to the Dodge City Legend basketball team. The arena has all spectator seating on one side as a stage for community theatre is located on the other side. When Dodge City High School played home basketball games there, the student section was situated on the stage.

Dodge City Community College also plays its home men's and women's basketball games there. The Civic Center is also home to the annual mid-season basketball tournaments (boys and girls) for the Southern Plains Iroquois Athletic Association (high school, commonly known by its acronym, SPIAA). It also often hosts a Kansas Class 1A regional or sub-state basketball tournament in late February or early March.

The building was built in 1955 and designed by Mann & Company, architects of Hutchinson.
