= Scott County Courthouse (Kansas) =

- Location within Kansas Location within the United States

General information
- Architectural style: Classical Revival
- Location: 303 Court Street, Scott City, Kansas
- Coordinates: 38°29′2″N 100°54′31″W
- Construction started: 1924
- Completed: 1925

Design and construction
- Architect: Mann & Company
- Main contractor: Henderson & Riggs

The Scott County Courthouse, located at 303 Court Street in Scott City, is the seat of government of Scott County, Kansas. Scott City has been the county seat since 1886. The courthouse was built from 1924 to 1925 by Henderson & Riggs.

Mann & Company of Hutchinson, Kansas designed the courthouse in the Classical Revival style. The courthouse is located on landscaped grounds, three stories, and faces east. It is constructed of red-colored brick and concrete, with a flat roof. Four Ionic columns rise two stories from the entrance steps and support a stone portico.

The first courthouse was constructed in 1887. It was a two-story wood-frame building with a one-story wood-frame wing.

Mann & Company also designed courthouses in Ellis County, Ellsworth County, Graham County, Pratt County, Republic County, Stafford County, and Stevens County.

== See also ==
- List of county courthouses in Kansas
