= Bevis Hillier =

British art historian

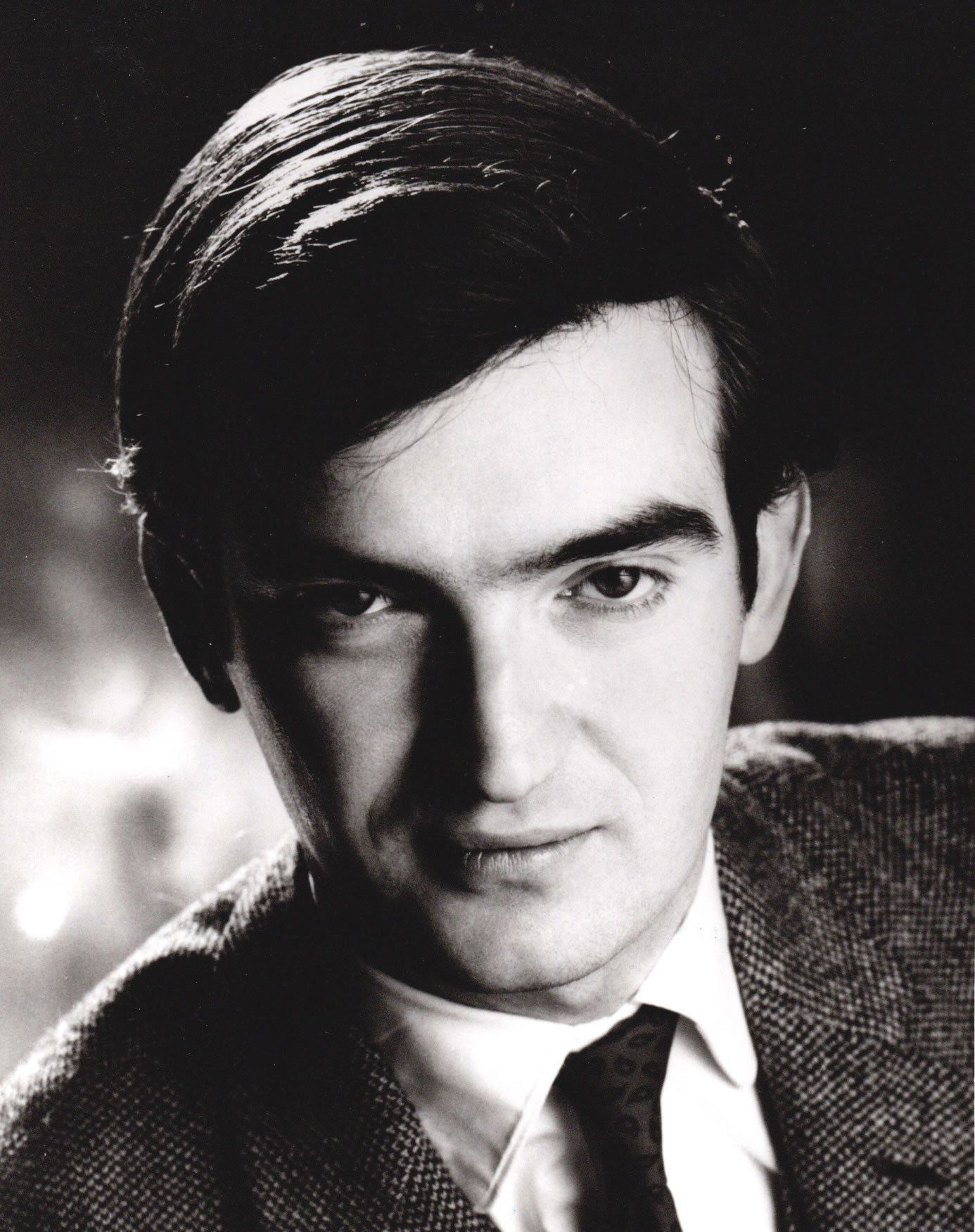
- Born: 28 March 1940 (age 86); Redhill, Surrey, England
- Education: Magdalen College, Oxford
- Occupations: Art historian, author and journalist
- Relatives: Jack Hillier (father)

Bevis Hillier (born 28 March 1940) is an English art historian, author and journalist. He has written on Art Deco, and also a biography of Sir John Betjeman.

== Life and work ==
Hillier was born in Redhill, Surrey. In 1947 the family moved to South Merstham, Surrey; in 1959, back to Redhill. His father was Jack Hillier, an authority and author on Japanese art; his mother, Mary Louise (née Palmer), was an authority on wax dolls and automata. Hillier was educated at Reigate Grammar School and Magdalen College, Oxford, where he won the Gladstone Memorial Prize for History. He was employed as a journalist on The Times from 1963 (on the editorial staff until 1968; edited The Connoisseur magazine (1972–76); antiques correspondent of The Times from 1970 to 1984; deputy literary editor from 1980 to 1981). In 1981, editor of The Times's colour magazine. From 1982 to 1984, features editor, then executive editor of the Telegraph Sunday Magazine. From 1984 to 1988, he was an associate editor of the Los Angeles Times. He has since been a reviewer for The Spectator.

In 1968 Hillier's book Art Deco of the 20s and 30s was published by Studio Vista. This was the first major work on a hitherto neglected genre of art that had previously been referred to as Art Moderne (the term Art Moderne has since come to be used to refer to the later streamlined style of Art Deco in the 1930s). Hillier's use of the term Art Deco became definitive. In 1971 Hillier curated a major Art Deco show at the Minneapolis Institute of Arts, which helped to increase popular awareness of this style.

In 1969 Weidenfeld published Hillier's Posters. In 1970 Studio Vista published his Cartoons and Caricatures, a study of caricature from the 13th century to the late 20th. Hillier has also written books on ceramics, as well as Austerity Binge: Decorative Arts of the 1940s and 50s and The Style of the Century (1983), a review of the various styles of art in the 20th century, from Art Nouveau through psychedelia and pop art to punk.

Hillier's major work, however, is the authorised biography of Sir John Betjeman. It took him 28 years to research and write, and was published by John Murray in three volumes (1988, 2002 and 2004). A one-volume abridgement was published in 2006 for Betjeman's centenary.

He was elected a Fellow of the Royal Society of Literature in 1997.

From the age of 60, Hillier has resided at the almshouse of the Hospital of St Cross in Winchester, Hampshire, having an appreciation for the architecture reminiscent of his time at Oxford.

== Betjeman letter hoax ==
In August 2006 a rival biography of Betjeman was published by A. N. Wilson. It was later discovered to contain a hoax letter, purportedly by Betjeman, but actually containing an acrostic insulting Wilson. The letter had been sent to Wilson by "Eve de Harben", an anagram of "Ever been had?", and the first letters of each sentence, beginning with the second sentence, spelled out the message "A. N. Wilson is a shit." Hillier was an immediate suspect for the literary forgery: the Sunday Times article revealing the hoax was accompanied by a prominent picture of Hillier and noted that an envelope containing a letter supposedly from de Harben to the newspaper had been bought in Winchester, his home town. Hillier initially denied responsibility, but soon admitted that he had written the letter. He explained that he had been angered by Wilson's negative review of the second volume of his biography of Betjeman, and by pre-publication publicity for Wilson's own biography.

== Bibliography ==
=== Books ===
- Art Deco of the 20s and 30s (Studio Vista/Dutton Picturebacks, 1968) ISBN 978-0-289-27788-1
- Pottery and Porcelain 1700–1914: England, Europe and North America (Weidenfeld & Nicolson, 1968) ISBN 0-29717668-4; "The Social History of the Decorative Arts" series
- Posters (Weidenfeld & Nicolson, 1969) ISBN 978-0-297-17934-4
- 100 Years of Posters (Pall Mall Press, 1972) ISBN 0269028382
- Victorian Studio Photographs: Unique Portraits of the Makers of the High Victorian Age. From the Collections of Studio Bassano and Elliott & Fry, London (Ash & Grant, 1975) ISBN 978-0-904-06903-7
- The Decorative Arts of the Forties and Fifties: Austerity/Binge (Clarkson N. Potter, 1975) ISBN 0-517-518503
- Travel Posters (Phaidon, 1976) ISBN 978-0-714-81623-4
- Bevis Hillier's Pocket Guide to Antiques (Mitchell Beazley, 1981) ISBN 0-855-333170
- John Betjeman: A Life in Pictures (John Murray, 1984) ISBN 0-719-541816
- Young Betjeman (John Murray, 1988) ISBN 0-719-545315
- John Betjeman: New Fame, New Love, 1934–1958 (John Murray, 2002) ISBN 0-719-550025
- Betjeman: The Bonus of Laughter (John Murray, 2004) ISBN 0-719-564956
- The Virgin's Baby: The Battle of the Ampthill Succession (Hopcyn Press, 2013) ISBN 978-0-957-29776-0

=== Articles ===
- "A laughing cavalier". The Spectator. 308 (9397): 32–34. 4 October 2008. Archived from the original on 4 December 2008.
