= Art Deco Architecture: Design, Decoration and Detail from the Twenties and Thirties =

1992 book by Patricia Bayer

- Hardcover edition
- Author: Patricia Bayer
- Language: English
- Subject: History of art Art Deco architecture
- Genre: Non-fiction
- Published: October 1992
- Publisher: Harry N. Abrams
- Publication place: United States
- Media type: Print
- Pages: 224 pp.
- ISBN: 978-0810919235
- OCLC: 25509002

Art Deco Architecture: Design, Decoration and Detail from the Twenties and Thirties is an illustrated book by American art historian Patricia Bayer. The book was initially published in October 1992 by Harry N. Abrams. Patricia Bayer is an art historian living in Connecticut and writing extensively on Art Deco design. Her other books include Art Deco Interiors and Art Deco Postcards. The book contains 376 illustrations, 146 in colour.

== Content ==
1. Introduction
2. Influences, Precursors and Parallels
3. International Expositions
4. Residences and Hotels
5. Public Buildings, Office Buildings, Factories, Stores, Restaurants, Cinemas, Theatres, Travel Buildings, Civic Structures, Churches and Monuments
6. Revivals and Replicas

== Review ==
From a sleekly modern apartment house in Cairo to a town hall in the Netherlands, architecture was influenced internationally by the Art Deco style, as revealed by this wide-angled, superbly illustrated survey. Bayer (The Art of Rene Lalique) first uncovers Art Deco's ancient and exotic sources, from Assyrian to Mayan to Moorish. Her text, wedded to 376 jazzy, snazzy illustrations (146 in color), demonstrates how this vibrant, decorative style extended between the wars into every nook and cranny of the U.S. leaving its mark on skyscrapers, movie theaters, firehouses, factories, dams, tunnels, high schools, gas stations, roadside diners and even gravestones. Bayer also examines the Art Deco revival, citing restored Miami Beach hotels as well as public buildings by Michael Graves, Robert Venturi and Helmut Jahn that echo or evoke Art Deco, a style "at once traditional and innovative."

—Publishers Weekly

== See also ==
- Art Deco of the 20s and 30s
- International style
- List of Art Deco architecture
- Paris architecture of the Belle Époque
- The New York Apartment Houses of Rosario Candela and James Carpenter
- Higher: A Historic Race to the Sky and the Making of a City
