= National Register of Historic Places listings in Reno County, Kansas =

Location of Reno County in Kansas

This is a list of the National Register of Historic Places listings in Reno County, Kansas.

This is intended to be a complete list of the properties and districts on the National Register of Historic Places in Reno County, Kansas, United States. The locations of National Register properties and districts for which the latitude and longitude coordinates are included below, may be seen in a map.

There are 22 properties and districts listed on the National Register in the county, and two former listings.

This National Park Service list is complete through NPS recent listings posted September 11, 2026.

== Current listings ==
	Name on the Register	Image	Date listed	Location	City or town	Description
1	Bernard's Restaurant and Catering		January 7, 2025 (#100011284)	2100 South Bonebrake Street. 38°01′36″N 97°54′30″W	Hutchinson	The building was demolished in late 2025.
2	Downtown Core North Historic District	Downtown Core North Historic District	November 18, 2004 (#04000739)	Generally bounded by BNSF Railway tracks, 1st Ave., west side of N. Main and Poplar St. 38°03′22″N 97°55′50″W	Hutchinson	Commercial and Industrial Resources of Hutchinson MPS
3	Downtown Core South Historic District	Downtown Core South Historic District	November 18, 2004 (#04000737)	Generally bounded by C Ave., the alley south of Sherman, and Washington and Poplar Sts. 38°03′07″N 97°55′52″W	Hutchinson	Commercial and Industrial Resources of Hutchinson MPS
4	Fox Theater	Fox Theater	September 7, 1989 (#89001391)	18 E. First; 38°03′16″N 97°55′48″W	Hutchinson	
5	John P.O. Graber House	John P.O. Graber House	January 27, 1994 (#93001518)	208 E. 6th St. 38°04′53″N 97°55′37″W	Hutchinson	
6	Hamlin Block	Hamlin Block	July 2, 2008 (#08000613)	304-306 S. Main St. 38°02′54″N 97°55′55″W	Hutchinson	Commercial and Industrial Resources of Hutchinson MPS
7	Hoke Building	Hoke Building	August 4, 2011 (#11000506)	25 E. 1st Ave. 38°03′11″N 97°55′49″W	Hutchinson	Commercial and Industrial Resources of Hutchinson MPS
8	Hotel Stamey		June 17, 2024 (#100010420)	501 N. Main; 38°03′31″N 97°55′55″W	Hutchinson	
9	Houston Whiteside Historic District		November 26, 2004 (#04000738)	Roughly bounded by BNSF Railway, Pershing, Ave. B and Ave. A, and Plum and Elm Sts. 38°03′15″N 97°55′11″W	Hutchinson	
10	Hutchinson Public Carnegie Library	Hutchinson Public Carnegie Library	June 25, 1987 (#87000968)	427 N. Main; 38°03′35″N 97°55′51″W	Hutchinson	
11	Kelly Mills	Kelly Mills	April 16, 2008 (#08000304)	400-414 S. Main St. 38°02′49″N 97°55′55″W	Hutchinson	Commercial and Industrial Resources of Hutchinson MPS
12	G.W. Norris House		November 4, 2009 (#09000876)	301 E. 12th Ave. 38°03′57″N 97°55′35″W	Hutchinson	
13	Ranson Hotel		November 20, 2008 (#08001067)	4918 E. Main St. 38°08′54″N 97°50′52″W	Medora	
14	Reno County Courthouse	Reno County Courthouse	April 13, 1987 (#86003530)	206 W. 1st 38°03′17″N 97°56′04″W	Hutchinson	
15	Anna Richardson-Brown House	Anna Richardson-Brown House	July 26, 2023 (#100009182)	311 North Peabody St. 38°09′01″N 98°04′49″W	Nickerson	
16	St. Teresa's Catholic Church	St. Teresa's Catholic Church	April 29, 1994 (#94000390)	211 E. 5th Ave. 38°03′33″N 97°55′38″W	Hutchinson	
17	Soldiers and Sailors Memorial	Soldiers and Sailors Memorial	May 24, 2002 (#02000557)	First Ave. and Walnut St. 38°03′12″N 97°55′47″W	Hutchinson	
18	Sylvia Rural High School		November 17, 2005 (#05001247)	203 Old K-50; 37°57′25″N 98°24′33″W	Sylvia	
19	Terminal Station	Terminal Station	October 13, 1983 (#83003601)	111 2nd Ave., E. 38°03′16″N 97°55′45″W	Hutchinson	
20	US Post Office-Hutchinson	US Post Office-Hutchinson	October 17, 1989 (#89001644)	128 E. First St. 38°03′15″N 97°55′38″W	Hutchinson	
21	Wall-Ratzlaff House	Wall-Ratzlaff House	April 30, 1992 (#92000443)	103 N. Maple; 38°08′05″N 97°46′09″W	Buhler	
22	Frank D. Wolcott House	Frank D. Wolcott House	May 6, 1994 (#94000408)	100 W. 20th Ave. 38°04′33″N 97°56′00″W	Hutchinson	

== Former listings ==
	Name on the Register	Image	Date listed	Date removed	Location	City or town	Description
1	Kansas Sugar Refining Company Mill	Kansas Sugar Refining Company Mill	January 3, 1985 (#85000013)	March 18, 2020	600 E. 1st St. 38°03′14″N 97°55′04″W	Hutchinson	Partially collapsed in 2019. Subsequently demolished.
2	Plevna General Store		December 22, 1988 (#88002968)	February 25, 2004	3rd and Main	Plevna	Destroyed by fire on January 3, 1997.

== See also ==
- List of National Historic Landmarks in Kansas
- National Register of Historic Places listings in Kansas
