= Beulah Armstrong =

American mathematician (1895–1965)

Beulah May Armstrong
- Born: November 18, 1895; Sterling, Kansas
- Died: February 22, 1965 (aged 69); Urbana, Illinois
- Burial place: Fairlawn Cemetery
- Education: Baker University; University of Kansas; University of Illinois Urbana-Champaign
- Occupations: Mathematician and university professor

Beulah May Armstrong (1895–1965) was an American mathematician and university professor. She was one of the few American women awarded a PhD in math before World War II.

== Biography ==
Beulah was born November 18, 1895 in Sterling, Kansas, the third of five children of Lillie J. Detter and John Allen Armstrong, both Pennsylvania natives.

In 1900 the family lived in Enterprise Township, Ford County, Kansas, where her father was a farmer, and by 1910 they had moved to Hutchinson, Kansas. Beulah graduated from Hutchinson High School and then attended Baker University in Baldwin City, a co-educational Methodist Church school in eastern Kansas. After receiving her bachelor 's degree from Baker University in 1917, she received a scholarship to attend the University of Kansas, and in 1918 she earned her master's degree there. Her master's thesis was titled, Simple And Complete K-Points in Continuous and in Modular Projective Spaces. She was offered an additional scholarship to continue her studies at Kansas, but did not accept it apparently because she was keen on doing graduate work at the University of Illinois where she was offered a scholarship for the academic year 1918–1919 and a fellowship for the following year.

She earned her PhD there in 1921 under George Abram Miller with the dissertation: Mathematical Induction in Group Theory. She taught at the University of Illinois from 1921 to 1931, was an associate from 1931 to 1945, then became an assistant professor from 1945 to 1959, and finally an associate professor at Illinois from 1959 until her retirement as an associate professor emeritus in 1963. She was heavily involved with advising aspiring math teachers while they studied with her at Illinois and she taught many of the math courses they were scheduled to take. In addition, she was one of the instructors for the University's correspondence courses.

She was active in a number of organizations on and off campus. She was secretary-treasurer of the Sigma Xi honor society and was a member of Kappa Delta Pi. She was listed in the Who's Who of American Women in the late 1950s.

She died suddenly at age 69 at her home on February 22, 1965, in Urbana, Illinois. She was buried in Fairlawn Cemetery, Hutchinson, Kansas and, in her will, she bequeathed $1,000 to her first alma mater Baker University.

== Memberships ==
Organizational affiliations, according to Green.

- American Mathematical Society (AMS)
- Mathematical Association of America (MAA)
- Sigma Delta Epsilon
- Sigma Xi
- Pi Mu Epsilon
- Phi Beta Kappa
