= Hutchinson High School (Kansas) =

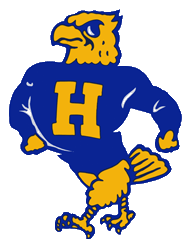

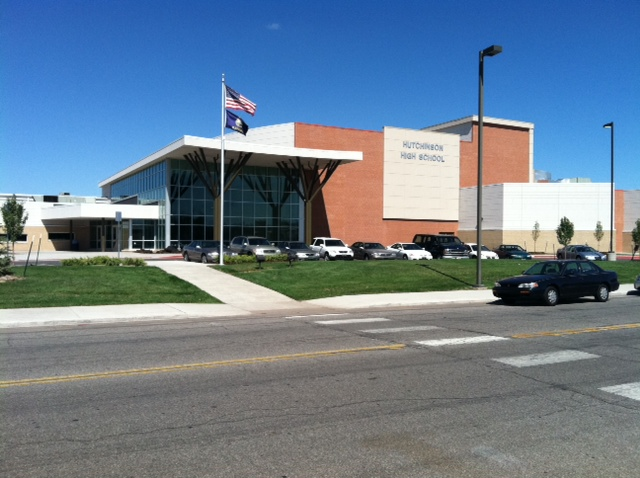
- Main Entrance of Hutch High (2011)

Location
- 810 East 13th Street; Hutchinson, Kansas 67501; United States; 38.067991°N 97.914487°W

Information
- School type: Public, High School
- Established: 1872
- School district: Hutchinson USD 308
- CEEB code: 171432
- Principal: Ryan Ewy
- Staff: 105.65 (FTE)
- Grades: 9-12
- Enrollment: 1,283 (2023–2024)
- Student to teacher ratio: 12.14
- Campus: Urban
- Colors: Blue and Gold
- Mascot: Sammy Salthawk
- Rival: Derby and Newton
- Newspaper: The Newshawk (defunct)
- Website: School webpage

Hutchinson High School is a public secondary school in Hutchinson, Kansas, United States, operated by Hutchinson USD 308 public school district. This school is the only public high school within the city limits of Hutchinson. The enrollment for 2020-2021 was 1,430 students. The school mascot is the Salthawk and the school colors are blue and gold. As of the 2020–2021 school year, the principal is Ryan Ewy, and the activities director is Kevin Armstrong.

Hutchinson High School is a member of the Kansas State High School Activities Association. Athletic teams compete in the 5A and 6A divisions and are known as the "Salthawks". Extracurricular activities are also offered in the form of performing arts, school publications, and clubs. The Salthawk football team won six consecutive state championships from 2004 to 2009.

== History ==
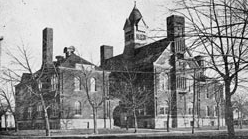
The first Hutchinson High School in 1908.

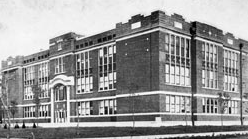
The second Hutchinson High School in 1915.

The first high school in Hutchinson was established in 1872 to help educate the growing population of Hutchinson. The first high school graduating class occurred in 1882. Due to the demand for more space, a new high school was constructed in 1891 at 5th and Maple. This location would last for nineteen years. In 1910, the city voted to approve the construction of a new $125,000 high school located at 7th and Walnut. In 1930, the Salt Hawk (shortened to Salthawk in the 1990s) became the school's official mascot. The high school would remain in this location until 1960 when, due to inadequate conditions, Hutchinson High moved to its current location at 13th and Severance.

The high school's current building was designed by Mann & Company, Hutchinson architects.

== School layout ==
Hutchinson High School consists of several halls. A Hall is the longest hall in the school. It is attached to the Salthawk Activity Center at the west and runs to the east, where it turns north toward the cafeteria. A Hall is bisected by the recently constructed M Hall, which houses upgraded drama, band, orchestra, and choir rooms. The "M-Hall Expansion" also included the construction of a new auditorium, allowing for the old one to be repurposed into a learning facility. This also created a new space for an upgraded 3-D art room, making use of the previous "backstage" area. Apart from A and M hall, there is B, C, G, F, and V halls. The Hutchinson Career and Vocational Technology Education (HCTEA or V hall) buildings, including the recently constructed T Building, stand-alone. There are three gymnasiums on campus (North Gym, South Gym, and the Main Gym/Salthawk Activity Center, known better as 'the SAC'). Many students attend classes and athletics practices (primarily swimming) at the YMCA close to campus. Students are also allowed to make the short trip to nearby Hutchinson Community College to take classes.

== Extracurricular activities ==
The Salthawks are a 5A school, the second largest classification in Kansas, according to the Kansas State High School Activities Association. Hutchinson has won several state championships in various sports.

=== Athletics ===
==== Football ====
The Salthawks are seven-time state champion in football, having won the state championship in 2004–2009, 2011, and were state runners-up in 2003, 2012. The first four state championships were 6A and the three most recent state championships were 5A.

==== Basketball ====
The Salthawk basketball teams won boys' championships in 1974, 1975, and 2001 and girls' championships in 1976 and 1985.

==== Cross Country ====
In 2009–2010, the cross country team won the AVCTL Championships, became regional runner-ups, and placed third in the state 5A championships.

==== Wrestling ====
The Salthawks wrestling team won state titles in 1973, 1982, 2002, and 2003, making it one of the most successful sports in Hutchinson High School history.

==== Other sports ====
The Salthawk boys' golf team won state championships in 1942, 1958, 1960, 1974, 1995, and 2005. The boys' track and field team won state titles in 1927, 1928, 1941, 1942, 2000 and 2004.

=== State championships ===
State Championships
| Season | Sport | Number of Championships | Year |
|---|---|---|---|
| Fall | Football | 7 | 2004, 2005, 2006, 2007, 2008, 2009, 2011 |
| Winter | Wrestling | 4 | 1973, 1981, 2002, 2003 |
| Winter | Basketball, Boys' | 3 | 1974, 1975, 2001 |
| Winter | Basketball, Girls' | 2 | 1976, 1985 |
| Winter | Indoor Track & Field, Boys' | 1 | 1973 |
| Spring | Golf, Boys' | 6 | 1942, 1958, 1960, 1974*, 1995, 2005 |
| Spring | Track & Field, Boys' | 7 | 1927, 1928, 1941, 1942, 2000, 2004, 2017 |
| Spring | Track & Field, Girls' | 2 | 2003, 2004 |
| Spring | Tennis, Boys' | 2 | 1934, 2010 |
| Total | | 33 | |

* In 1974 Hutchinson High School won both the 2-man & 4-man state golf championships. In those days, trophies were awarded to the winner of both, so their total golf titles could be interpreted as 7 golf titles and 33 titles overall.

Hutchinson High School offers the following sports:

=== Fall ===
- Football
- Volleyball
- Boys' Cross-Country
- Girls' Cross-Country
- Girls' Golf
- Boys' Soccer
- Girls' Tennis
- Cheerleading

=== Winter ===
- Boys' Swimming
- Boys' Basketball
- Girls' Basketball
- Wrestling
- Boys' Bowling
- Girls' Bowling
- Winter Cheerleading

=== Spring ===
- Baseball
- Boys' Golf
- Boys' Tennis
- Girls' Soccer
- Girls' Swimming
- Softball
- Boys' Track and Field
- Girls' Track and Field

=== School newspaper and yearbook ===
The Newshawk was the school's official paper. It was published on a monthly basis. However, it is not published.

=== Speech and Debate ===
Hutch High has produced 13 NFL All-Americans since 1986 and has produced 77 national qualifying students since 1972. The debate team placed 1st at state in 2009 and 2010. The debate program has, as of 2019, won 16 state championships.

- The debate team won KSHSAA state championships in 1941, 1944, 1946, 1950, 1951, 1976, 1981, 1982, 1993, 1994, 1996, 1998, 1999, 2007, 2009, and 2010.

== Notable alumni ==
- Beulah Armstrong, American mathematician and professor
- Jack Banta, former MLB player for the Brooklyn Dodgers
- David Dillon, former CEO of The Kroger Company, former student body president at the University of Kansas
- Geneo Grissom, third-round pick in the 2015 NFL draft for the New England Patriots
- Ben Heeney, fifth-round pick in the 2015 NFL draft for the Oakland Raiders
- V. John Krehbiel, Ambassador to Finland
- Ronald Parker, screenwriter and movie producer, former director of development for the Producers Circle Company and former vice president of Creative Affairs for Marble Arch Productions
- Fay B. Prickett, U.S. Army major general
- Donald Worster, one of the founders and leading figures in the field of environmental history, Distinguished Foreign Expert, and senior professor in the School of History of Renmin University of China

== See also ==
- List of high schools in Kansas
- List of unified school districts in Kansas
