= Buhler USD 313 =

Public school district in Buhler, Kansas

Address
- 406 W. 7th St. Buhler, Kansas, 67522; United States
- Coordinates: 38°8′32″N 97°46′31″W

District information
- Type: Public
- Grades: K to 12

Other information
- Website: usd313.org

Buhler USD 313 is a public unified school district headquartered in Buhler, Kansas, United States. The district includes the communities of Buhler, northeast Hutchinson, Medora, and nearby rural areas.

== Schools ==
The school district operates the following schools:

- Buhler High School
- Prairie Hills Middle School
- Buhler Grade School
- Plum Creek Elementary School
- Union Valley Elementary School

Closed schools

- Obee Elementary School (K-6) (closed)
- Prosperity Elementary School (4-6) (closed)

== See also ==
- Kansas State Department of Education
- Kansas State High School Activities Association
- List of high schools in Kansas
- List of unified school districts in Kansas
