= StraightLine HDD =

- StraightLine Logo (2003 – Present)
- Company type: Private
- Industry: Directional Drilling Tooling & Equipment
- Founded: Kansas, United States (January 1, 1984, as StraightLine Manufacturing, Inc.)
- Headquarters: 1816 E. Wasp Rd., Hutchinson, Kansas 67501
- Website: straightlinehdd.com

StraightLine HDD, formerly StraightLine Manufacturing, Inc., is an American corporation which designs and builds tooling and equipment for the Directional drilling industry. The company's products include directional drills, mud mixing systems, air hammers and a full line of down hole tools, wear parts and accessories for all brands of directional drill rigs.

Established in Wichita, Kansas on January 1, 1984, the company was called "StraightLine Manufacturing, Inc." for its first 19 years.

Today StraightLine HDD has directional drilling equipment, tools and accessories operating in the United States, Canada, the United Kingdom, Singapore, Malaysia, China, Australia, India, Poland, Ukraine and the Russian Federation.

== History ==
=== 1984 to 1988: The early years ===
StraightLine Manufacturing, Inc. is founded in Wichita, Kansas. During this time the company launches its family of rotary tools and introduces a dry bore solution.

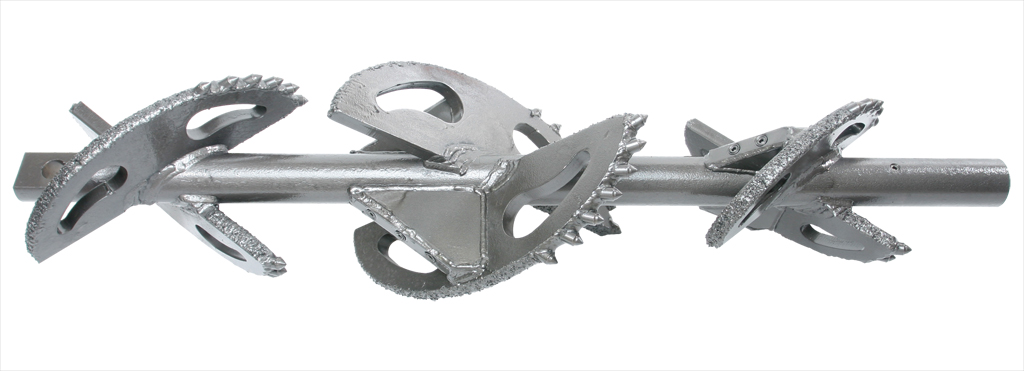
A Cyclone back reamer built by StraightLine HDD

=== 1989 to 2002: Entering the HDD market ===
StraightLine entered the HDD market with the introduction of its line of DirectLine drills in 1989. In 1991 the company moved to a 36,000 sq ft (3,300 m^{2}). facility in Newton, Kansas, and opened a new 9,000-square-foot (840 m^{2}) engineering/technical support facility on the 13-acre (53,000 m^{2}) grounds.

Finco Inc.

=== 2003 to Present: Acquisition by Finco Inc. ===
StraightLine was acquired by privately held Finco Inc. d/b/a Source: HDD in 2003. Finco Inc. rebranded the company as StraightLine HDD and relocated the company to a new 70,000 sq ft (6,500 m^{2}). manufacturing plant in Hutchinson, Kansas.

== Patents ==
StraightLine HDD has been awarded four US Patents:

- US Patent 5231899 for a drilling rig breakout wrench system on August 3, 1993.
- US Patent 5253721 for a directional boring head on October 19, 1993.
- US Patent 5709276 for a multi-position directional drill on January 20, 1998.
- US Patent 5921331 for a backreamer on July 13, 1999.
