= Valley Center, Kansas =

City in Sedgwick County, Kansas

- City
- Location within Sedgwick County and Kansas
- Interactive map of Valley Center, Kansas
- Coordinates: 37°49′47″N 97°22′10″W
- Country: United States
- State: Kansas
- County: Sedgwick
- Founded: 1870s
- Incorporated: 1885
- Named for: Little Arkansas River valley

Government
  - Mayor: Jet Truman

Area
  - Total: 7.11 sq mi (18.41 km^{2})
  - Land: 7.10 sq mi (18.40 km^{2})
  - Water: 0.0039 sq mi (0.01 km^{2})
- Elevation: 1,345 ft (410 m)

Population (2020)
  - Total: 7,340
  - Density: 1,030/sq mi (399/km^{2})
- Time zone: UTC-6 (CST)
  - Summer (DST): UTC-5 (CDT)
- ZIP Code: 67147
- Area code: 316
- FIPS code: 20-73250
- GNIS ID: 473852
- Website: valleycenterks.gov

Valley Center is a city in Sedgwick County, Kansas, United States, and a suburb of Wichita. As of the 2020 census, the population of the city was 7,340.

== History ==
Valley Center was incorporated on September 29, 1885, and was named for its location in the valley of the Arkansas River.

The former Valley Center rail depot for Atchison, Topeka and Santa Fe Railway Company and the St. Louis-San Francisco Railway Company was moved to south of Hillsboro at the southeastern corner of Indigo Rd and 140th Street and is currently a private residence.

On the morning of July 17, 2007, a large explosion occurred at the Barton Solvents chemical plant in Valley Center, destroying the plant and forcing the temporary evacuation of the city. Cleanup began several weeks later, and the investigation was completed by mid-August.

== Geography ==
Valley Center is located at 37°49′47″N 97°22′10″W (37.829719, -97.369341). According to the United States Census Bureau, the city has a total area of 6.95 square miles (18.00 km^{2}), all land.

Valley Center is located two miles west of the combined Interstate 135, U.S. Route 81 and K-15.

== Demographics ==
Historical population
Census	Pop.	Note	%±
1880	71		—
1890	167		135.2%
1900	312		86.8%
1910	381		22.1%
1920	486		27.6%
1930	896		84.4%
1940	700		−21.9%
1950	854		22.0%
1960	2,570		200.9%
1970	2,551		−0.7%
1980	3,300		29.4%
1990	3,624		9.8%
2000	4,883		34.7%
2010	6,822		39.7%
2020	7,340		7.6%
2023 (est.)	7,347		0.1%
U.S. Decennial Census; 2010-2020

Valley Center is part of the Wichita, KS Metropolitan Statistical Area.

=== 2020 census ===
As of the 2020 census, Valley Center had a population of 7,340. The median age was 36.0 years. 29.5% of residents were under the age of 18 and 14.6% of residents were 65 years of age or older. For every 100 females there were 96.4 males, and for every 100 females age 18 and over there were 94.4 males age 18 and over.

88.1% of residents lived in urban areas, while 11.9% lived in rural areas.

There were 2,620 households and 1,967 families in Valley Center. Of all households, 39.7% had children under the age of 18 living in them, 58.5% were married-couple households, 14.6% were households with a male householder and no spouse or partner present, and 21.3% were households with a female householder and no spouse or partner present. About 19.5% of all households were made up of individuals and 8.3% had someone living alone who was 65 years of age or older.

There were 2,789 housing units, of which 6.1% were vacant. The homeowner vacancy rate was 1.2% and the rental vacancy rate was 9.9%.

Racial composition as of the 2020 census
Race	Number	Percent
White	6,323	86.1%
Black or African American	101	1.4%
American Indian and Alaska Native	77	1.0%
Asian	45	0.6%
Native Hawaiian and Other Pacific Islander	1	0.0%
Some other race	160	2.2%
Two or more races	633	8.6%
Hispanic or Latino (of any race)	580	7.9%

=== Income and poverty ===
The 2016–2020 5-year American Community Survey estimates show that the median household income was $66,250 (with a margin of error of +/- $8,521) and the median family income $73,183 (+/- $6,598). Males had a median income of $44,175 (+/- $9,121) versus $27,475 (+/- $8,688) for females. The median income for those above 16 years old was $37,107 (+/- $6,335). Approximately, 1.7% of families and 2.9% of the population were below the poverty line, including 1.9% of those under the age of 18 and 0.0% of those ages 65 or over.

=== 2010 census ===
As of the census of 2010, there were 6,822 people, 2,484 households, and 1,862 families living in the city. The population density was 981.6 inhabitants per square mile (379.0/km^{2}). There were 2,601 housing units at an average density of 374.2 per square mile (144.5/km^{2}). The racial makeup of the city was 94.2% White, 0.8% African American, 0.8% Native American, 0.4% Asian, 1.3% from other races, and 2.5% from two or more races. Hispanic or Latino of any race were 4.6% of the population.

There were 2,484 households, of which 42.6% had children under the age of 18 living with them, 58.5% were married couples living together, 11.0% had a female householder with no husband present, 5.5% had a male householder with no wife present, and 25.0% were non-families. 22.6% of all households were made up of individuals, and 9.3% had someone living alone who was 65 years of age or older. The average household size was 2.75 and the average family size was 3.22.

The median age in the city was 34.3 years. 31.4% of residents were under the age of 18; 7.1% were between the ages of 18 and 24; 26.3% were from 25 to 44; 23.8% were from 45 to 64; and 11.4% were 65 years of age or older. The gender makeup of the city was 49.5% male and 50.5% female.

== Education ==
Valley Center USD 262 employs approximately 370 people and serves more than 2,760 children from the communities of Valley Center, Park City, Kechi, and Wichita. The schools include one Pre-K–3 building, two K–3 schools, an intermediate school that houses the fourth and fifth grades, a sixth, seventh and eighth grade middle school, and a high school. There is also an alternative school, The Learning Center, which assists students of all ages earning their high school diploma. The Valley Center school district mascot is the Hornets.

== Events ==
- Fall Festival – Annual event in September

== Notable people ==
Notable individuals who were born in and/or have lived in Valley Center include:

- Cady Groves (1989–2020), pop-country singer
- Patrick Miller (born 1980), U.S. Army Staff Sergeant, prisoner of war

== See also ==
- Arkansas Valley Interurban Railway
- Theorosa's Bridge, a reportedly haunted bridge and site of local folklore
