= Hutchinson USD 308 =

Public school district in Hutchinson, Kansas

Address
- 1520 N. Plum St. Hutchinson, Kansas, 67501; United States
- Coordinates: 38°4′14″N 97°55′16″W

District information
- Type: Public
- Grades: K to 12
- Schools: 11

Other information
- Website: usd308.com

Hutchinson USD 308 is a public unified school district headquartered in Hutchinson, Kansas, United States. The district includes most of the city of Hutchinson.

== Schools ==
The school district operates the following schools:

- Hutchinson High School
- Hutchinson Middle School 7
- Hutchinson Middle School 8
- Magnet School at Allen
- Avenue A Grade School (A Program)
- Faris Elementary School
- Graber Elementary School
- Lincoln-McCandless Elementary School
- Morgan Elementary School
- Wiley Elementary School

== See also ==
- Kansas State Department of Education
- Kansas State High School Activities Association
- List of high schools in Kansas
- List of unified school districts in Kansas
