= Theorosa's Bridge =

Reportedly haunted bridge in Sedgwick County, Kansas, U.S.

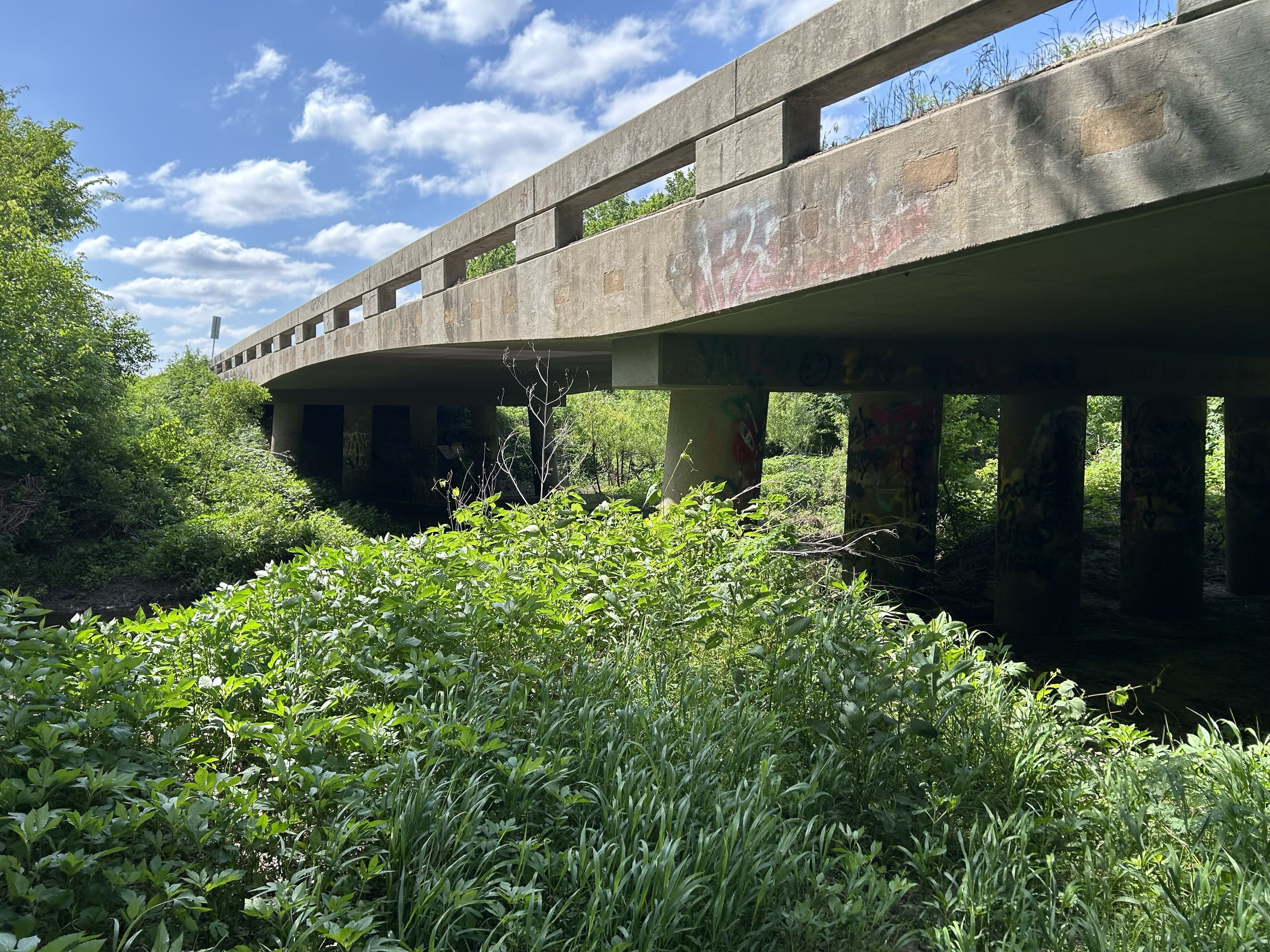
- Theorosa's Bridge in 2026
- Interactive map of Theorosa's Bridge
- Location: Sedgwick County, Kansas
- Nearest city: Valley Center, Kansas
- Coordinates: 37°52′59.18″N 97°22′26.55″W

Theorosa's Bridge is a reportedly haunted bridge located west of 109th Street North and Meridian between the towns of Sedgwick and Valley Center in Kansas. The bridge spans Jester Creek. Due to its reputation it has become a site of local folklore. Over the years, it has burned down and been rebuilt. There are several versions of a haunted urban legend, most surrounding a woman, but none have been confirmed historically or otherwise. The theories surrounding the bridge has attracted visitors in search of paranormal sightings.
