= Houston Whiteside Historic District =

Historic district in Kansas, United States

- U.S. National Register of Historic Places
- Location within Kansas Location within the United States
- Location: Roughly bounded by BNSF RR, Pershing, Ave. B and Ave. A, Plum and Elm Sts., Hutchinson, Kansas
- Coordinates: 38°03′15″N 97°55′11″W
- Area: 61.6 acres (24.9 ha)
- Architect: Selby Kurfis, Others
- Architectural style: Late Victorian, Late 19th And 20th Century Revivals
- NRHP reference No.: 04000738
- Added to NRHP: November 26, 2004

The Houston Whiteside Historic District in Hutchinson, Kansas is a 61.6 acres (24.9 ha) historic district which was listed on the National Register of Historic Places in 2004.

The district is roughly bounded by the BNSF Railway tracks on the north, by Pershing St. on the east, by East Ave. B and East Ave. A on the south, and by Plum and South Elm on the west. It included 175 contributing buildings and two contributing structures.

Atchison, Topeka, and Santa Fe Railroad tracks run through the district.

"Key Contributing" properties in the district include:

- 402 E. First Avenue (c. 1890s), a two-story Queen Anne house with multiple gable-on-hip roofs
- John Nelson House (c. 1898), 407 E. First Avenue, an elaborate Second Empire house.
