= Hutchinson Municipal Airport (Kansas) =

Airport in Reno County, Kansas, US

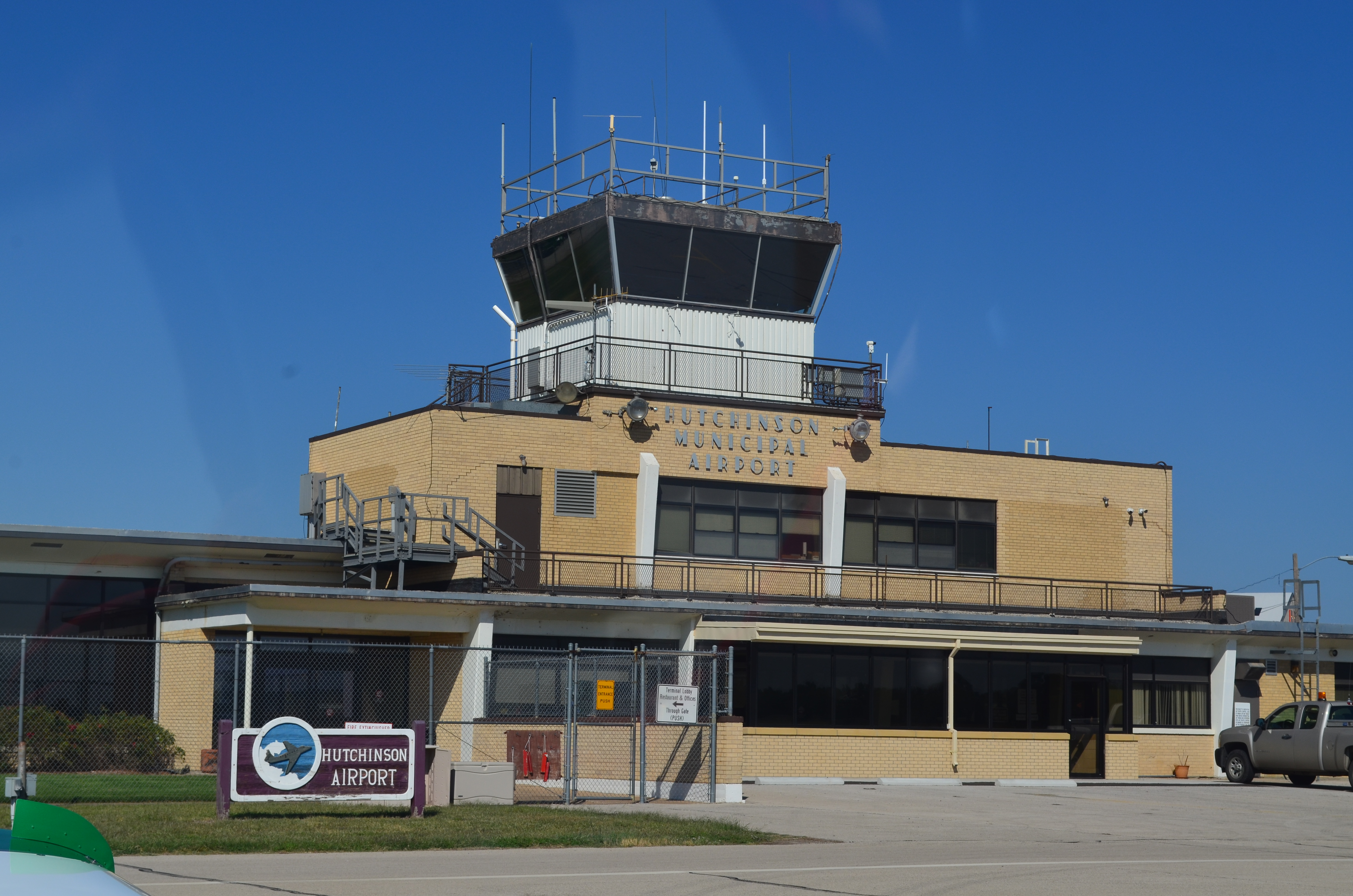
- IATA: HUT; ICAO: KHUT; FAA LID: HUT

Summary
- Airport type: Public
- Owner: City of Hutchinson
- Serves: Hutchinson, Kansas
- Elevation AMSL: 1,543 ft (470 m)
- Coordinates: 38°03′56″N 097°51′38″W
- Interactive map of Hutchinson Municipal Airport

Runways
Direction	Length		Surface
Direction	ft	m	Surface
13/31	7,004	2,135	Asphalt
4/22	6,000	1,829	Asphalt
17/35	4,252	1,296	Asphalt

Statistics (2008)
- Aircraft operations: 53,134
- Based aircraft: 29
- Source: Federal Aviation Administration

Hutchinson Municipal Airport (IATA: HUT, ICAO: KHUT, FAA LID: HUT) is a city-owned public airport three miles east of Hutchinson, in Reno County, Kansas, United States.

== Facilities and aircraft ==
Hutchinson Municipal Airport covers 1,597 acres (646 ha) at an elevation of 1,543 feet (470 m) above mean sea level. It has three asphalt runways: 13/31 is 7,004 by 100 feet (2,135 x 30 m); 4/22 is 6,000 by 100 feet (1,829 x 30 m); and 17/35 is 4,252 by 75 feet (1,296 x 23 m).

In 2010 the airport had 40,850 aircraft operations, average 120 per day: 88% general aviation, 7% military and 5% air taxi, 33 aircraft were then based at this airport: 71% single-engine, 21% multi-engine, 5% jet and 3% helicopter.

There have been no airline flights since 1990. Efforts to attract airlines in recent years have failed, the airport being too close to Kansas' busiest airport, Wichita.

=== Historical airline service ===
Hutchinson had been served by commercial airlines with direct flights to Denver, Kansas City, and Wichita from about 1944 through 1990. Continental Airlines provided the first service from 1944 through 1961. Continental used Douglas DC-3, Convair 340, and Vickers Viscount aircraft. Central Airlines served from 1961 through 1967 using DC-3s, Convair 240s, and Convair 600s. Frontier Airlines from 1967 through 1970 using Convair 580s, and Air Midwest from 1970 through 1990 using Cessna 402s, Beechcraft 99s, and Fairchild Swearingen Metroliner IIs. During 1988 Air Midwest operated as Eastern Express on behalf of Eastern Airlines and during 1989 as Braniff Express on behalf of Braniff Airways.

== See also ==
- List of airports in Kansas
