= Sedgwick, Kansas =

City in Harvey and Sedgwick County, Kansas

- City
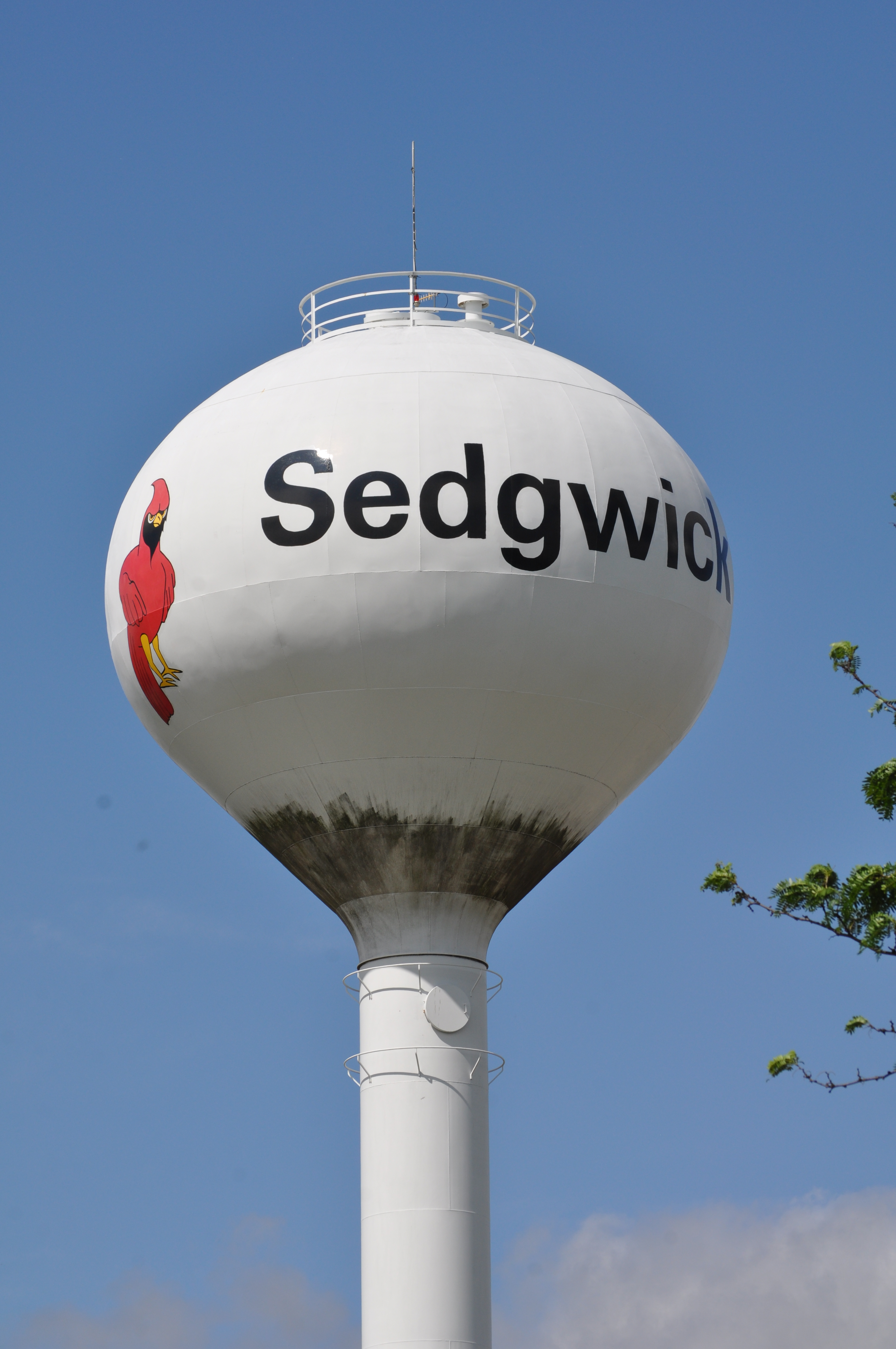
- Sedgwick Water Tower (2015)

- Location within Harvey County and Kansas

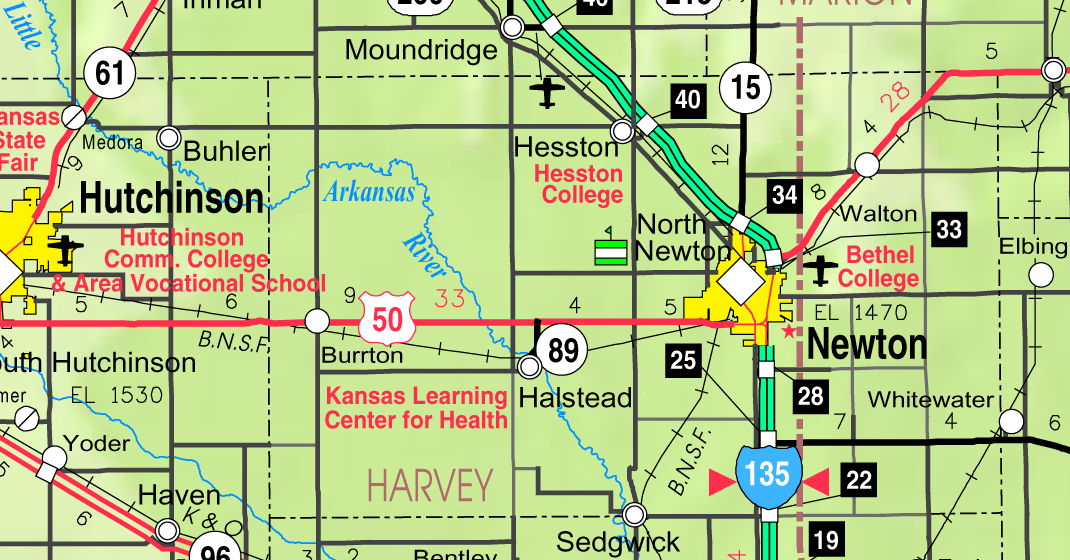
- KDOT map of Harvey County (legend)
- Coordinates: 37°55′05″N 97°25′13″W
- Country: United States
- State: Kansas
- County: Harvey, Sedgwick
- Founded: 1870
- Platted: 1870
- Incorporated: 1872
- Named for: John Sedgwick

Government
  - Type: Mayor–Council

Area
  - Total: 1.63 sq mi (4.23 km^{2})
  - Land: 1.63 sq mi (4.23 km^{2})
  - Water: 0 sq mi (0.00 km^{2})
- Elevation: 1,378 ft (420 m)

Population (2020)
  - Total: 1,603
  - Density: 982/sq mi (379/km^{2})
- Time zone: UTC-6 (CST)
  - Summer (DST): UTC-5 (CDT)
- ZIP Code: 67135
- Area code: 316
- FIPS code: 20-63800
- GNIS ID: 2396570
- Website: cityofsedgwick.org

Sedgwick is a city in Harvey and Sedgwick counties in the U.S. state of Kansas. As of the 2020 census, the population of the city was 1,603.

== History ==
For millennia, the land now known as Kansas was inhabited by Native Americans. In 1803, most of modern Kansas was secured by the United States as part of the Louisiana Purchase. In 1854, the Kansas Territory was organized, then in 1861 Kansas became the 34th U.S. state. In 1867, Sedgwick County was founded. In 1872, Harvey County was founded.

Sedgwick was laid out on an 80-acre (32 ha) town site in 1870. It was named for John Sedgwick, a major general in the Union Army during the American Civil War. Sedgwick was incorporated as a city in 1872.

== Geography ==
According to the United States Census Bureau, the city has a total area of 1.41 square miles (3.65 km^{2}), all land.

=== Climate ===
The climate in this area is characterized by hot, humid summers and generally mild to cool winters. According to the Köppen Climate Classification system, Sedgwick has a humid subtropical climate, abbreviated "Cfa" on climate maps.

== Demographics ==
Historical population
Census	Pop.	Note	%±
1880	415		—
1890	652		57.1%
1900	622		−4.6%
1910	626		0.6%
1920	731		16.8%
1930	832		13.8%
1940	738		−11.3%
1950	732		−0.8%
1960	1,095		49.6%
1970	1,083		−1.1%
1980	1,471		35.8%
1990	1,438		−2.2%
2000	1,537		6.9%
2010	1,695		10.3%
2020	1,603		−5.4%
U.S. Decennial Census

=== 2020 census ===
As of the 2020 census, Sedgwick had a population of 1,603. The median age was 39.2 years. 27.2% of residents were under the age of 18 and 16.3% of residents were 65 years of age or older. For every 100 females there were 92.9 males, and for every 100 females age 18 and over there were 94.5 males age 18 and over.

0.0% of residents lived in urban areas, while 100.0% lived in rural areas.

There were 609 households in Sedgwick, of which 33.8% had children under the age of 18 living in them. Of all households, 52.9% were married-couple households, 16.6% were households with a male householder and no spouse or partner present, and 24.5% were households with a female householder and no spouse or partner present. About 28.2% of all households were made up of individuals and 13.9% had someone living alone who was 65 years of age or older.

There were 649 housing units, of which 6.2% were vacant. The homeowner vacancy rate was 1.4% and the rental vacancy rate was 6.5%.

Racial composition as of the 2020 census
Race	Number	Percent
White	1,422	88.7%
Black or African American	6	0.4%
American Indian and Alaska Native	15	0.9%
Asian	2	0.1%
Native Hawaiian and Other Pacific Islander	5	0.3%
Some other race	22	1.4%
Two or more races	131	8.2%
Hispanic or Latino (of any race)	101	6.3%

=== 2010 census ===
As of the census of 2010, there were 1,695 people, 611 households, and 440 families living in the city. The population density was 1,202.1 inhabitants per square mile (464.1/km^{2}). There were 643 housing units at an average density of 456.0 per square mile (176.1/km^{2}). The racial makeup of the city was 95.8% White, 0.2% African American, 0.5% Native American, 0.3% Asian, 1.5% from other races, and 1.7% from two or more races. Hispanic or Latino of any race were 4.4% of the population.

There were 611 households, of which 40.6% had children under the age of 18 living with them, 56.1% were married couples living together, 10.5% had a female householder with no husband present, 5.4% had a male householder with no wife present, and 28.0% were non-families. 24.5% of all households were made up of individuals, and 9.4% had someone living alone who was 65 years of age or older. The average household size was 2.68 and the average family size was 3.21.

The median age in the city was 37 years. 29.6% of residents were under the age of 18; 6.5% were between the ages of 18 and 24; 24.6% were from 25 to 44; 24.3% were from 45 to 64; and 14.9% were 65 years of age or older. The gender makeup of the city was 48.0% male and 52.0% female.

=== 2000 census ===
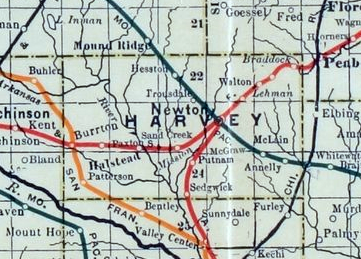
1915 railroad map of Harvey County

As of the census of 2000, there were 1,537 people, 545 households, and 424 families living in the city. The population density was 1,408.8 inhabitants per square mile (543.9/km^{2}). There were 568 housing units at an average density of 520.6 per square mile (201.0/km^{2}). The racial makeup of the city was 95.71% White, 0.07% African American, 1.56% Native American, 0.26% Asian, 0.78% from other races, and 1.63% from two or more races. Hispanic or Latino of any race were 3.12% of the population.

There were 545 households, out of which 40.9% had children under the age of 18 living with them, 65.5% were married couples living together, 8.3% had a female householder with no husband present, and 22.2% were non-families. 20.9% of all households were made up of individuals, and 9.2% had someone living alone who was 65 years of age or older. The average household size was 2.71 and the average family size was 3.15.

In the city, the population was spread out, with 29.6% under the age of 18, 6.4% from 18 to 24, 30.7% from 25 to 44, 19.5% from 45 to 64, and 13.8% who were 65 years of age or older. The median age was 35 years. For every 100 females, there were 93.6 males. For every 100 females age 18 and over, there were 92.9 males.

As of 2000 the median income for a household in the city was $44,934, and the median income for a family was $49,659. Males had a median income of $37,216 versus $24,732 for females. The per capita income for the city was $17,009. About 4.4% of families and 6.2% of the population were below the poverty line, including 11.7% of those under age 18 and 5.9% of those age 65 or over.

== Education ==
The community is served by Sedgwick USD 439 public school district.

== Notable people ==
- Bryce Douvier (born 1991), professional basketball player.
- Allen Kanavel (1874–1938), surgeon, professor of surgery and he established the Department of Neurological Surgery at Northwestern University School of Medicine.
- Harold Manning (1909–2003), long-distance runner, he represented the United States in the steeplechase at the 1936 Summer Olympics.
- Brian Moorman (born 1976), punter in the NFL for the Buffalo Bills.

== See also ==
- National Register of Historic Places listings in Harvey County, Kansas
- Arkansas Valley Interurban Railway
- Theorosa's Bridge, a nearby reportedly haunted bridge and site of local folklore
