= Arkansas Valley Interurban Railway =

American railroad from 1910 to 1938

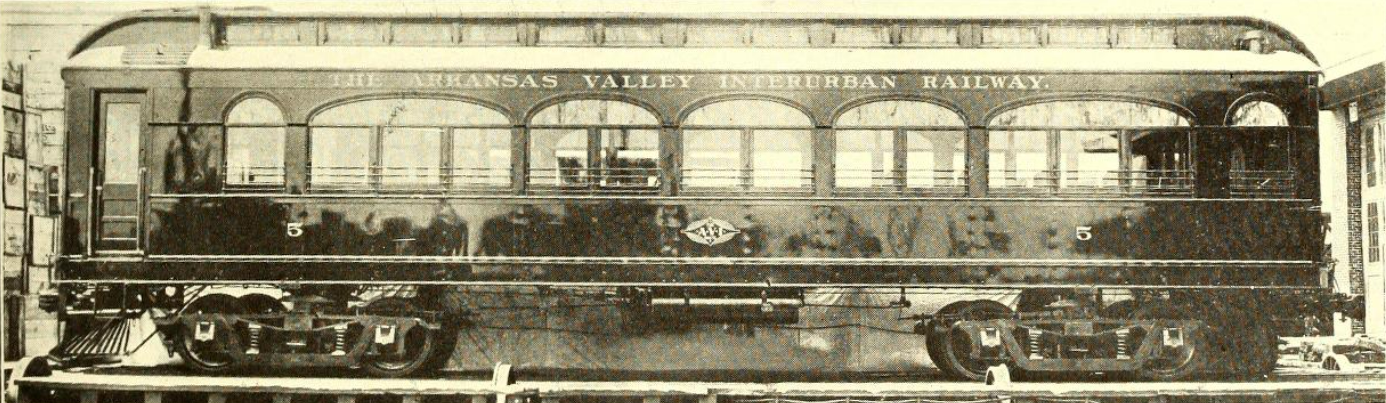
Arkansas Valley Interurban Railway Car

The Arkansas Valley Interurban Railway (AVI) was an interurban railway that operated in Kansas, United States, from 1910 to 1938 for passengers and to 1942 for freight, running between Wichita, Newton, and Hutchinson. It operated a small fleet of electrically powered passenger and freight equipment. Service was suspended during World War II and never resumed, except on a small portion owned by the Hutchinson and Northern Railroad which is still in operation. (2020)

== History ==
=== Proposal ===
The AVI, as it emerged, was only a portion of a proposal in 1910 for a large network of interurban lines focusing on Wichita, running passenger and freight services mainly in competition with the Atchison, Topeka and Santa Fe Railway and expecting to feed freight to the St. Louis–San Francisco Railway and the Midland Valley Railroad, also to Wichita's new transcontinental line the Kansas City, Mexico and Orient Railway when that was finished – it never was.

The main line was to have been from Wichita to Salina, which two cities lacked any direct passenger railroad service between them – although the line would have run closely parallel with the Santa Fe to Newton, then the Missouri Pacific Railroad to McPherson and finally the Union Pacific Railroad to Salina.

From this line, another one would have run from Van Arsdale Junction (south-west of Newton) to Hutchinson and Great Bend, again closely paralleling Santa Fe lines. From Hutchinson, a third line would have run direct to Hudson and would have given rail access to a portion of territory that lacked it.

To the south of Wichita, a line would have run to Oxford via Belle Plaine, with a short branch to Wellington from the latter place. At Oxford, it would have joined a circular service running Oxford - Winfield - Arkansas City - Geuda Springs- Oxford which would have subsumed a pre-existing little interurban between Winfield and Arkansas City called the Southwestern Interurban Railway of Kansas.

The project was a strictly local one, financed with capital raised by selling shares in the cities it hoped to serve. The chief promoters were W. O. Van Arsdale, a Wichita stockbroker who gave his name to the railway's main junction, and George Theis Jnr who was to acquire control and who had an amusement park named after him on the line outside Newton. The city of Wichita was strongly in support, and invested $30 000. Theis, a Wichita capitalist and enthusiast for interurbans, founded the Interurban Construction Company to build the system.

=== Construction ===
Construction began in 1910 on the first 17.8-mile (28.6 km) long section from Wichita north to Sedgwick. On November 19, 1910 the line from Wichita to Valley Center was officially opened, and service was extended to Sedgwick on December.

In 1911, construction began on the Sedgwick to Newton segment, which was opened on October 9, 1911. With the completion of the line to Newton, work began on the line to Halstead, which branched off of the Newton line at Van Arsdale Junction and headed straight west for five miles. This section opened late in 1911.

It was not until 1915 that construction began on extending the Halstead branch another 24 miles (39 km) to reach Hutchinson, but work commenced in April of that year and the first AVI car ran to Hutchinson on December 22, 1915.

=== Bethel Line ===
The only other branch operated by the AVI was a short line north from Newton to Bethel College which opened in 1913 and was abandoned in 1925. This was essentially an urban streetcar line nicknamed the Bethel Line – the city lacked a system of its own.

Unfortunately the service always ran at a loss, even after a renovation of the track and the provision of new cars in 1921. In 1923, the company tried to abandon but the Public Utilities Commission of Kansas enforced a continuation order. The AVI appealed this, and the case was heard in the Supreme Court of the United States in 1927. Judgment was against the company on the grounds that the Bethel Line was an integral part of the franchise conditions granted by the city of Newton, but by then nobody cared much and the service never resumed.

=== Downtown access ===
The interurban passenger services initially used the streetcar systems of Wichita and Hutchinson to access downtown, although these were separately owned. However, a private right of way was constructed into Wichita in 1923. This was very fortunate, because the Wichita streetcars were abandoned in 1933 and the interurban would have had to shut to passengers in that year otherwise.

In 1932 the AVI was forced to build its own access to the Chicago, Rock Island and Pacific Railroad station at Hutchinson, after the city streetcar company (confusingly called the Hutchinson Interurban Railway) went bankrupt and was scrapped.

=== End of extension hopes ===
These downtown extensions were the only ones that the AVI built, and the rest of the original scheme was given up in the Twenties. In 1922 George Theis Jr., President of the AVI, bought out the Southwestern Interurban Railway of Kansas on his own account, and restructured it as the Arkansas City, Winfield and Northern Railway. This was with the intention of making it part of the AVI system, but the ACW&N was a hopeless enterprise. It had originally opened in 1909 and included in-city electric trolley systems for both Ark City and Winfield, as well as the 14 miles (23 km) of actual interurban trackage between the two. By mid-1925 though, Arkansas City was dismantling its in-city system and by April 1926, the trackage between the two cities was no longer in use and was being taken up. The last vestige of the ACW&N to operate was the College Hill line of the Winfield city portion of the railway, making its last run in May 1926. This was just months before George Theis' tragic death on August 13, 1926.

=== Struggle for business ===
The interurban was three years younger than the Ford Model T automobile, and so always suffered from increasing automobile use. It was also hit by the mechanization of agriculture in the Twenties, as combine harvesters and tractors reduced the demand for farm workers and so the number of rural travelers. On the other hand, bus competition was patchy and the company actually ran feeder bus services (many other interurbans were crippled by competition from jitney buses). The company responded to declining passenger revenue by raising fares to 3.6 cents per mile – very high for any interurban – but this did not help.

On the other hand, freight revenue increased and became very important. The AVI had been projected with freight traffic in mind, exchanged with friendly steam railroads, but initially the emphasis was on LCL (less-than-carload or parcel) freight and on milk, cream and other perishable foodstuffs taken into the cities from farms. Only when roads improved was it feasible for farmers to use trucks to get to market for such items. As time went on, carload freight came to dominate and this was mostly switched through to steam roads. Important commodities were cattle, grain and oil. A large sand and gravel pit was at Forest Park north of Wichita, and the Carey Salt Company opened a deep salt mine just east of Hutchinson in 1923 which was to be the AVI's most important customer.

The salt mine proprietors opened a very short switching line in 1923, running from the AVI west of their mine for about 3 miles (4.8 km) south-west to the Missouri Pacific Railroad at Hutchinson, and incorporated this as a common carrier called the Hutchinson and Northern Railroad. This road also owned the mine spur from the AVI line.

=== Failure ===
The Great Depression affected the AVI as it did all interurban lines, and revenues declined owing to the serious economic downturn. As a result, the company entered receivership in 1933. It had well-laid track, so the receiver ordered deferred maintenance but the deterioration resulting damaged the passenger business further. Interurban cars were engineered with relatively soft springing in order to take up irregularities in track with light rails, but once the track decayed the ride could oscillate violently as a result.

An evocative description of an interurban ride in the last days: "A ride ... was an experience never to be forgotten. Particularly on the wooden cars the bodies jerked back and forth, and threatened to fly off their trucks every time the cars started or stopped quickly. Windows rattled in their rotting sashes, and interior doors that could no longer close were banging against their warped frames. The gentle rolling motion of earlier years gave way to a violent rocking that made it impossible to keep parcels in their luggage racks, and the rocking in turn was intensified by twisting lurches as one set of wheels passed over a dip in the rails where the ties had rotted."

On July 31, 1938, all passenger service on the AVI was abandoned, but the company continued to haul freight using its electric locomotives and box motors.

In November 1939 the line was sold to the H.E. Salzberg Company, which its name to Arkansas Valley Railway. Dieselization came within a year, and the last electric operation was made on October 20, 1940, by a trio of interurban cars held in storage since abandonment of passenger service. Following this run the wires came down and all freight was hauled by diesel. This only lasted a year and a half; in July 1942 the War Production Board requisitioned the line for scrap and the track was mostly torn up.

However, the salt mine at Hutchinson still needed rail access so the Hutchinson and Northern Railroad bought the length of track to there from its property in the city, about 6 miles (9.7 km). This is still in operation (2020).

== Route ==
=== Wichita metropolitan ===
The company offices were at Wichita, and its terminal station was on the north-west corner of West Douglas Avenue and North Waco Avenue. Actually occupying the corner is a seven-storey hotel built by the company, the Broadview Hotel. This historic building is still a hotel, the Drury Plaza, and is in good condition. Included in it, facing Waco near the former passenger terminal (the replacement building on the site of the latter is now occupied by the AVI Seabar & Chophouse), is a wide stone arch with AVI on its keystone and the epigraph Freight Station above.

Freight connections came in from the Midland Valley Railroad and the Kansas City, Mexico and Orient Railroad, both of which terminated at Wichita and so were grateful to the AVI for forwarding freight.

The line crossed the Arkansas River, then paralleled McLean Boulevard to cross back over just west of the mouth of the Little Arkansas River. From here it ran to the west end of W Murdock Street in Riverside, where the Botanica station building survives bearing the AVI logo. Then the railway followed Amidon Street to W 13th Street N and then N Perry Avenue, diagonally across North Riverside and across the Little Arkansas River at Woodland Park with a station at 21st Street which connected with a streetcar line. From here, it was due north to the Santa Fe railroad, where Interurban Avenue preserves its course paralleling the railroad. Stops were at 24th Street, 29th Street, Bingham, Walnut Grove (where the company had an amusement park and a siding), Sullivan's Dam, Heller's Grove, Forest Park (here, an industrial spur owned by the AVI ran west to serve a gravel pit), Urbandale, Interurban Place (siding), Van View and Fairfield.

Before the AVI built its reserve access to downtown, it used the Wichita streetcar system. The interurban met the end of the latter's 21st Street line near Woodland Park, and ran to a terminal at 1st and Water. The streetcar company strengthened its tracks over this portion to bear the weight of the AVI cars.

=== Wichita to Van Arsdale ===
The railway then ran north-west, closely parallel to the Santa Fe, on its west side, to Sedgwick where it veered due north to Van Arsdale. Here the Newton branch had a triangular wye.

Stops were at Bide-a-wee, Goodrich (siding), Substation One, Valley Center (siding), Ferguson (siding), Lloyd, Congden (siding), Mahannah, Sedgwick (siding), Seaman, Hall (siding), Bowersox and Briggs (siding). At Valley Center, a triangular wye made a freight connection to the St Louis - San Francisco Railroad.

=== Newton branch ===
The Newton branch from Van Arsdale had stops at Royer, Hupp, Theis Park (which was another amusement park run by the company and named after its president, and which had a siding), Nicholson, Sand Creek and Newton.

The terminal was on E 5th Street and Main, where the little Bethel Line streetcar connected for its mile-long (1.6 km) run to Bethel College.

=== Van Arsdale to Hutchinson ===
From Van Arsdale, the main line ran due west to Halstead, where it met the Santa Fe railroad again and followed it on the south side as far as the salt mine, where it turned due west to run to its downtown terminus opposite the Rock Island railroad station. Stops were at Chapel, Emma Creek, Mission (siding), McNair, Halstead (siding and freight spur), McWilliams, White (siding), Drees, Packston (siding), Armstrong or Lynn (siding), Bell (siding), Dobbin, Burrton (siding, and a triangular wye as a freight connection to the St Louis - San Francisco Railroad facing south), Fast, Fairview (with Morrison Siding and freight spur), Lassen, Smyth (siding), Masterman, Brandy Lake or Cooper (siding), Kent, Strandberg (siding), Campbell, Hutton, Salt Mine (the line to this did not belong to the AVI) and Strawboard (siding).

The Terminal Station building at Hutchinson survives, and is recognised as of historic importance. The address is 111 East 2nd Avenue.

The AVI in Hutchinson forwarded freight to the Rock Island Railroad and the Santa Fe, but not to the Missouri Pacific Railroad which is why the salt mine company built the Hutchinson and Northern Railroad as a connection.

The station buildings at Halstead and Burrton also survive.

== Operations ==
=== Passengers ===
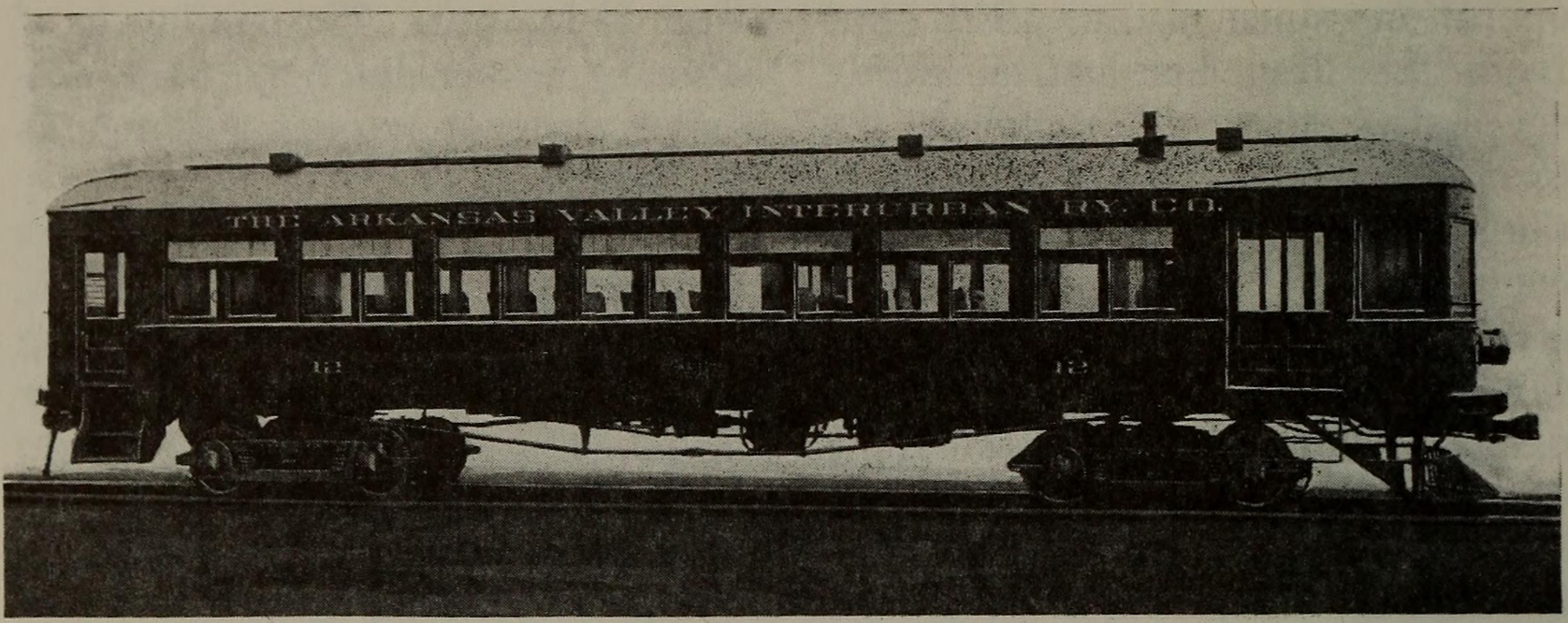
Arkansas Valley Interurban Railway Car

Passenger operations in, for example, February 1926 were typically on an 90 minute interval, running between Wichita and Hutchinson with the Newton branch having a connecting shuttle meeting at Van Arsdale. The first car out of Wichita was at 6:00, and the last at 23:30 with thirteen runs. From Hutchinson, the first was 6:20, and the last 11:25 also with thirteen runs. A direct Newton to Wichita service left at 00:10, to arrive at 1:20 and with a Hutchinson connection arriving at 1:40. All these ran daily, unchanged on Sundays, but on Mondays to Saturdays a commuter run was made additionally from Wichita to Valley Center and back, leaving at 6:35.

The Newton shuttle did not always have connections to both cities at Van Arsdale. There was a total of nineteen runs on the branch each way, including the midnight through special mentioned above.

The company did not own trailer cars, and their motor cars were not adapted for multiple-unit operation.

The 52.5 miles (84.5 km) main line run usually took two hours. The 6 miles (9.7 km) Newton branch took 20 minutes. The company advertised baggage accommodations to be the same as available on steam railroads.

For rural stops, the conductor-guard on the car sold paper tickets, each of which was printed with a list of stops, dates and fares payable. It was the conductor's job to punch out the relevant start and finish of journey, date and fare collected. Strictly speaking this was a Conductor's Cash Fare Receipt for a single journey, because it couldn't be purchased in advance and return tickets were not available. Stops within the terminal cities were included in a single fare stage, which in Wichita started or ended at 21st Street where the interurban interchanged with the city's streetcar system.

The little Newton to Bethel streetcar line serving Bethel College was a separate operation, and not timetabled with the two main services although it connected with Van Arsdale to Newton cars at the city's terminal station.

=== Freight ===
The company in the Twenties advertised a daily express LCL freight service, using its motorised box cars, as well as carload freight trains. However, the operation of the latter was hampered by an inadequate power supply and the voltage between sub-stations sometimes dropped from its expected 625 volts to as low as 300 volts. This meant that only short carload trains could be run, or only one car at a time.

=== Equipment ===
The passenger cars of the AVI were numbered 1 to 12, and comprised a wide variety. All but one were wooden bodied. Most came from the St. Louis Car Company, but the McGuire-Cummings Manufacturing Company, the American Car and Foundry Company and the Cincinnati Car Company provided singletons. The American firm's number 12 was considered the best.

The St Louis firm also provided motorised box cars for LCL freight. An electric locomotive for hauling freight cars, number 602, was bought from General Electric in 1929 and sold on to the Chicago North Shore and Milwaukee Railroad in 1942.

Cars number 2, 8 and 9 were sold to Bethel College after the end of passenger service, taken off their trucks and used as overflow dormitory accommodation. How horrible this was still remembered half a century later, by those who had to sleep there. Car number 10 (latterly converted to a freight trailer) became a diner at Peabody, Kansas. Car number 12, the former pride and joy, became a farmer's chicken coop and feed store at Bentley, Kansas, until rescued for the Great Plains Transportation Museum in 1988.
