= Buhler, Kansas =

City in Reno County, Kansas

- City
- Location within Reno County and Kansas

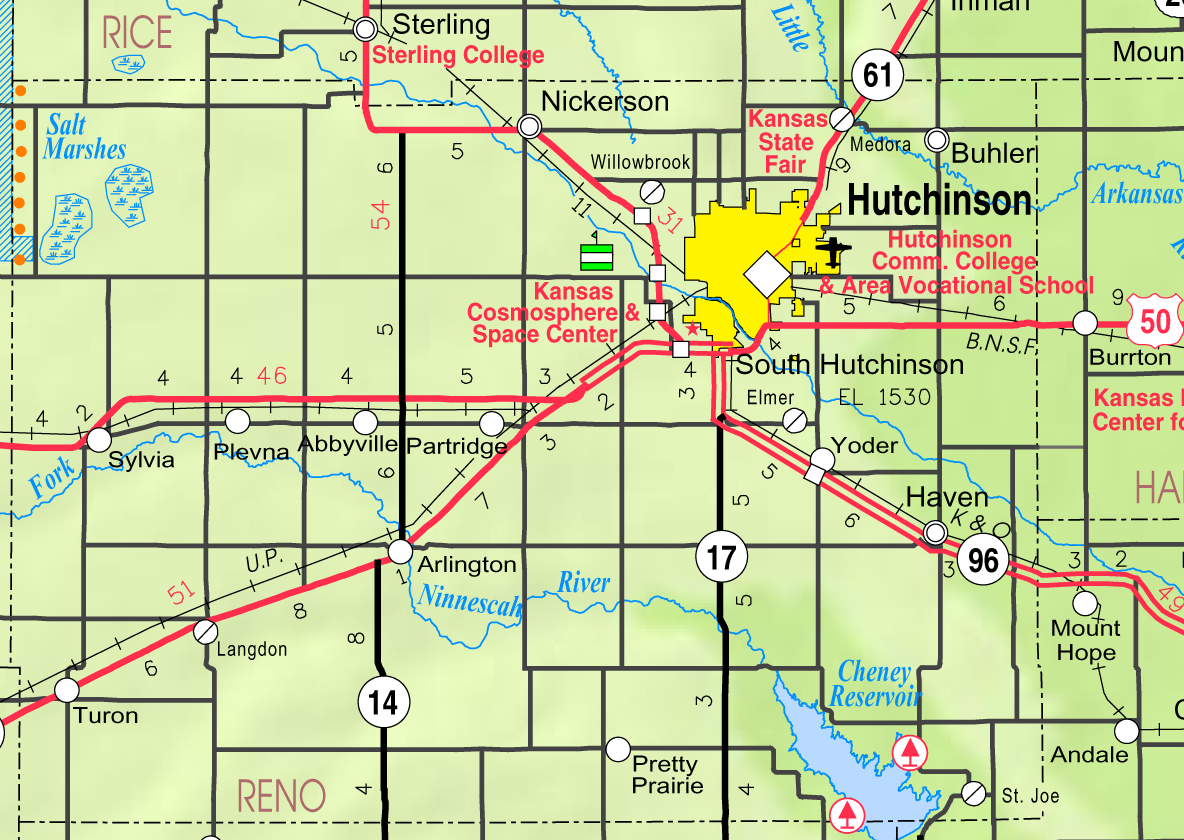
- KDOT map of Reno County (legend)
- Coordinates: 38°08′18″N 97°46′14″W
- Country: United States
- State: Kansas
- County: Reno
- Founded: 1888
- Incorporated: 1913

Government
  - Type: Mayor–Council
  - Mayor: Jake Schmidt

Area
  - Total: 0.71 sq mi (1.85 km^{2})
  - Land: 0.71 sq mi (1.85 km^{2})
  - Water: 0 sq mi (0.00 km^{2})
- Elevation: 1,486 ft (453 m)

Population (2020)
  - Total: 1,325
  - Density: 1,850/sq mi (716/km^{2})
- Time zone: UTC-6 (CST)
  - Summer (DST): UTC-5 (CDT)
- ZIP Code: 67522
- Area code: 620
- FIPS code: 20-09200
- GNIS ID: 2393460
- Website: buhlerks.org

Buhler is a city in Reno County, Kansas, United States. As of the 2020 census, the population of the city was 1,325.

== History ==
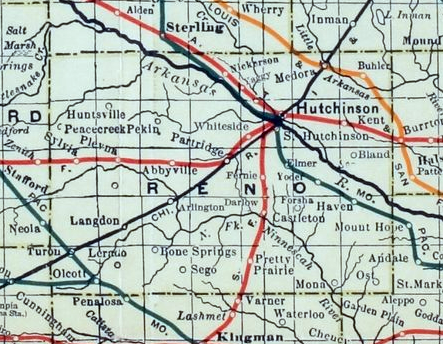
1915 railroad map of Reno County

The first post office in Buhler was established in 1888.

Buhler was primarily inhabited by Mennonite families that had emigrated from Russia during the 1880s.

In September 2012, the City of Buhler received a letter from the Freedom from Religion Foundation regarding a complaint about perceived constitutual violations about the city seal having a cross in it. In November 2012, the city stated that every legal opinion it had received indicated the city has no supportable case in the event that it was sued to legally force the removal of the seal. If the city lost, it would be obligated to pay all the legal fees of the prevailing party. The city decided to hold a contest in January 2013 to redesign the city seal without specific reference to religion.

== Geography ==
According to the United States Census Bureau, the city has a total area of 0.72 square miles (1.86 km^{2}), all land.

== Demographics ==
Historical population
Census	Pop.	Note	%±
1920	486		—
1930	520		7.0%
1940	634		21.9%
1950	750		18.3%
1960	888		18.4%
1970	1,019		14.8%
1980	1,188		16.6%
1990	1,277		7.5%
2000	1,358		6.3%
2010	1,327		−2.3%
2020	1,325		−0.2%
U.S. Decennial Census

=== 2020 census ===
The 2020 United States census counted 1,325 people, 477 households, and 337 families in Buhler. The population density was 1,850.6 per square mile (714.5/km^{2}). There were 534 housing units at an average density of 745.8 per square mile (288.0/km^{2}). The racial makeup was 91.47% (1,212) white or European American (88.53% non-Hispanic white), 0.75% (10) black or African-American, 0.68% (9) Native American or Alaska Native, 0.6% (8) Asian, 0.08% (1) Pacific Islander or Native Hawaiian, 0.53% (7) from other races, and 5.89% (78) from two or more races. Hispanic or Latino of any race was 5.28% (70) of the population.

Of the 477 households, 34.8% had children under the age of 18; 59.1% were married couples living together; 22.6% had a female householder with no spouse or partner present. 26.8% of households consisted of individuals and 16.4% had someone living alone who was 65 years of age or older. The average household size was 2.3 and the average family size was 2.6. The percent of those with a bachelor's degree or higher was estimated to be 17.5% of the population.

27.5% of the population was under the age of 18, 6.9% from 18 to 24, 22.0% from 25 to 44, 19.4% from 45 to 64, and 24.2% who were 65 years of age or older. The median age was 39.5 years. For every 100 females, there were 112.0 males. For every 100 females ages 18 and older, there were 119.4 males.

The 2016–2020 5-year American Community Survey estimates show that the median household income was $55,859 (with a margin of error of +/- $14,409) and the median family income was $62,500 (+/- $14,540). Males had a median income of $40,761 (+/- $3,845) versus $18,869 (+/- $4,976) for females. The median income for those above 16 years old was $30,272 (+/- $5,864). Approximately, 4.5% of families and 5.1% of the population were below the poverty line, including 7.2% of those under the age of 18 and 2.8% of those ages 65 or over.

=== 2010 census ===
As of the census of 2010, there were 1,327 people, 483 households, and 361 families residing in the city. The population density was 1,843.1 inhabitants per square mile (711.6/km^{2}). There were 520 housing units at an average density of 722.2 per square mile (278.8/km^{2}). The racial makeup of the city was 98.1% White, 0.1% African American, 0.7% Native American, 0.1% Pacific Islander, 0.5% from other races, and 0.6% from two or more races. Hispanic or Latino of any race were 2.4% of the population.

There were 483 households, of which 36.0% had children under the age of 18 living with them, 63.1% were married couples living together, 9.3% had a female householder with no husband present, 2.3% had a male householder with no wife present, and 25.3% were non-families. 23.6% of all households were made up of individuals, and 13% had someone living alone who was 65 years of age or older. The average household size was 2.57 and the average family size was 3.03.

The median age in the city was 41.1 years. 26.8% of residents were under the age of 18; 6.8% were between the ages of 18 and 24; 20.9% were from 25 to 44; 23.3% were from 45 to 64; and 22.2% were 65 years of age or older. The gender makeup of the city was 47.2% male and 52.8% female.

== Government ==
The Buhler government consists of a mayor and five council members. The council meets the last Tuesday of each month at 7 pm.

== Education ==
The community is served by Buhler USD 313 public school district. The school district administrative office is located in Buhler. The district has six schools and two are located in Buhler:

- Buhler High School, Grades 9 to 12.
- Buhler Grade School, Grades PreK to 5.

== Notable people ==
- Katharina Schellenberg, Mennonite medical missionary.

== See also ==
- Threshing Stone
