= Plevna General Store =

Historic building in Plevna, Kansas, US

- Formerly listed on the U.S. National Register of Historic Places
- Location within Kansas Location within the United States
- Location: 3rd and Main, Plevna, Kansas
- Coordinates: 37°58′20″N 98°18′31″W
- Area: less than one acre
- Built: 1913
- Architect: Caldwell, John
- NRHP reference No.: 88002968

Significant dates
- Added to NRHP: December 22, 1988
- Removed from NRHP: February 25, 2004

The Plevna General Store was a historic general merchandise store located at the corner of 3rd Avenue and Main Street in Plevna, Kansas, United States. It was built in 1913 and was added to the National Register of Historic Places on December 22, 1988. The building was in continuous operation as a general store for 83 years until it was destroyed by a fire in 1997.

== History ==
In the 1880s, local businessman Jeremiah Hinshaw purchased a general merchandise business in Plevna, Kansas. In 1897, Jeremiah sold a half interest in the general store to his brother Emmett Hinshaw, and the business became the Hinshaw and Hinshaw General Mercantile. The original Hinshaw general store was located on the first floor of the Santa Fe Hotel, located at 301 S. Main Street in Plevna.

=== 1910s–1920s ===
When the location of the original store was demolished to make space for a new bank building, the Hinshaw brothers were forced to relocate their business. They chose a location directly across the street to the north (219 S. Main Street) in Plevna as the location for the new store. In September 1913, construction began on the new general store building. The new "Hinshaw and Hinshaw General Store" opened for business the week of November 17, 1913.

In 1917, Emmett Hinshaw's son, N.H. "Jack" Hinshaw, purchased a one-quarter interest of stock in the business from his father and uncle. A year later, in 1918, Jeremiah Hinshaw left the business. Emmett continued to run the store until his death in 1928.

=== 1920s–1970s ===
Following Emmett Hinshaw's death in 1928, his son Jack took ownership of the store. Jack operated the store for the next 47 years until selling the business in 1975.

=== 1970s–1980s ===
Darrell Lee Holmes purchased the store from Hinshaw in 1975 and operated it for several months. The store was then sold to Harold Beem, who operated it until 1986.

=== 1980s–1990s ===
In 1986, the Hinshaw Store was purchased by Charles and Shirley Kern and was renamed the Plevna General Store. The Kern family operated the store for 10 years. During that time, Charles Kern restored the store to its original 1913 condition. After restoration, the store was described as "one of the most architecturally elaborate examples of an early 20th century detached commercial building remaining in Kansas." The building featured the original pressed-tin 14-foot ceilings and preserved hardwood floors, along with the original scale, cash register, display cases, and arched windows. A root cellar was located under the building, and Kern still used a hand-operated cargo elevator to access it. Many of the relics which he found in the root cellar were displayed in the main store. These antique items included Peet Brothers Soap, B&R Root Beer Flavor, and Dr. Hess Stock Tonic. The store became a national and international attraction, receiving visitors from Queens, NY, Los Angeles, CA, Japan, England, New Zealand, and Germany.

== Fire ==
At approximately 7:50 pm on Friday, January 3, 1997, the building caught fire and was completely destroyed as a result. It took firefighters several hours to bring the conflagration under control. Although the exact origin of the blaze was never determined, an electrical fire was thought to be the cause. Owner Charles Kern told The Hutchinson News "When I arrived, the power line between the building and the pole was burning, and the building started burning on that side."

== Historical recognition ==
The Plevna General Store was added to the Register of Historic Kansas Places and National Register of Historic Places on December 22, 1988. It was removed from the register on February 25, 2004.
