= St. Teresa's Catholic Church (Hutchinson, Kansas) =

Historic church in Kansas, United States

- U.S. National Register of Historic Places
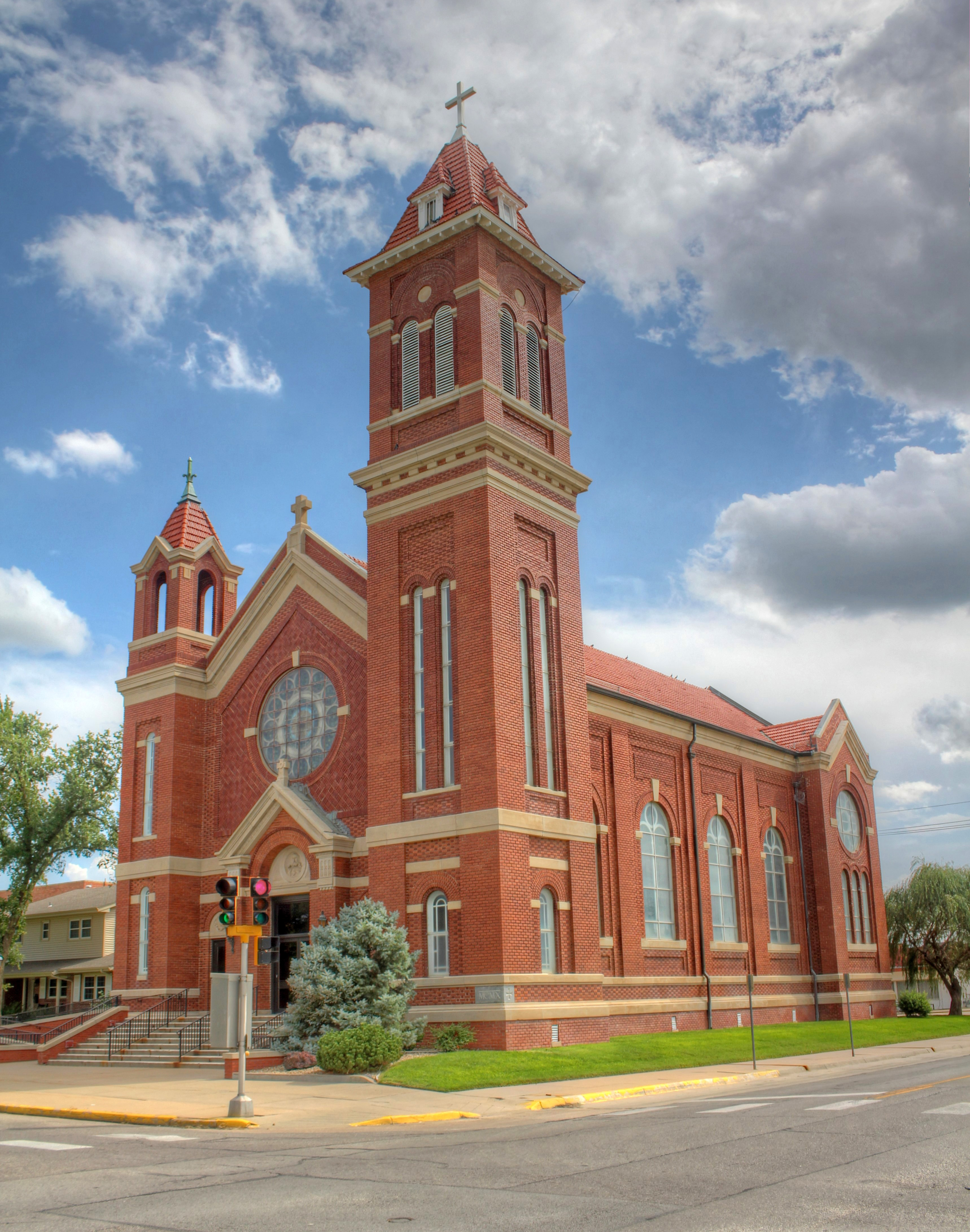

- Location within Kansas Location within the United States
- Location: 211 E. 5th Ave., Hutchinson, Kansas
- Coordinates: 38°3′29″N 97°55′37″W
- Area: less than one acre
- Built: 1910
- Architect: Emmanuel L. Masqueray; Harry I. Ellis
- Architectural style: Romanesque
- NRHP reference No.: 94000390
- Added to NRHP: April 29, 1994

St. Teresa's Catholic Church is a historic church at 211 E. 5th Avenue in Hutchinson, Kansas, United States. It was built in 1910 and added to the National Register on April 29, 1994.

The church is part of the St. Teresa of Avila Parish

== History ==
The Reverend Farrell became pastor of the church 1908 when it was still a small frame building. In September 1909, a collection was held to raise funds for a new building. The cornerstone of the new Romanesque building was laid in May 1910. The building was completed and dedicated on May 18, 1911.
