= Terminal Station (Hutchinson, Kansas) =

- U.S. National Register of Historic Places
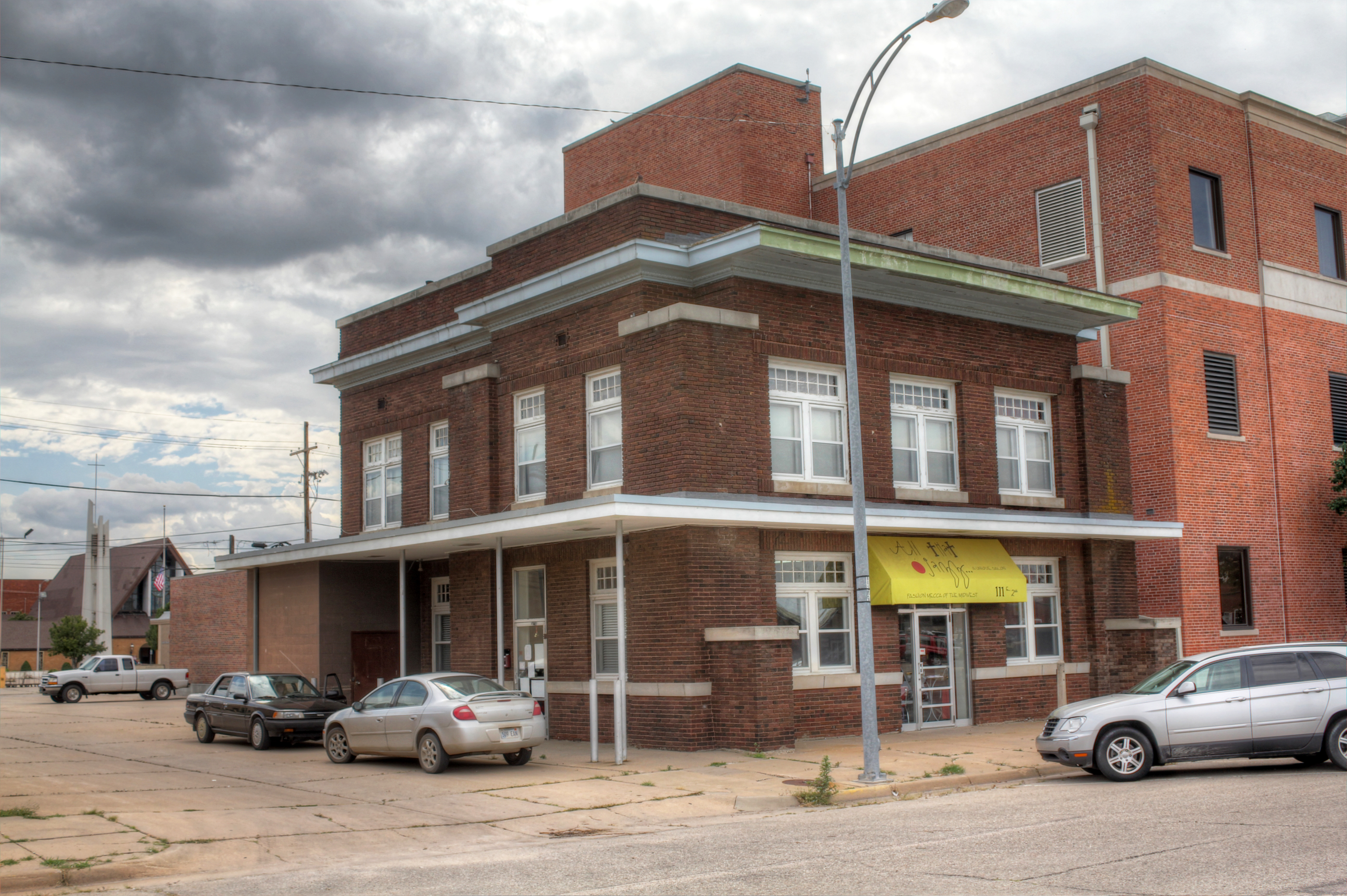

- Location within Kansas Location within the United States
- Location: 111 2nd Ave., E., Hutchinson, Kansas
- Coordinates: 38°3′16″N 97°55′45″W
- Built: 1915
- Built by: Foy Construction Company
- Architectural style: Prairie School
- NRHP reference No.: 83003601
- Added to NRHP: October 13, 1983

The Terminal Station in Hutchinson, Kansas is a Prairie School style building built in 1915. It was listed on the National Register of Historic Places in 1983.

It was built as a station of the Wichita-based Arkansas Valley Interurban Railway trolley-car system.

In 1983, its first floor was a Trailways Bus station and its second floor was unused.
