= Hutchinson, Kansas =

City in Reno County, Kansas

- City and County seat
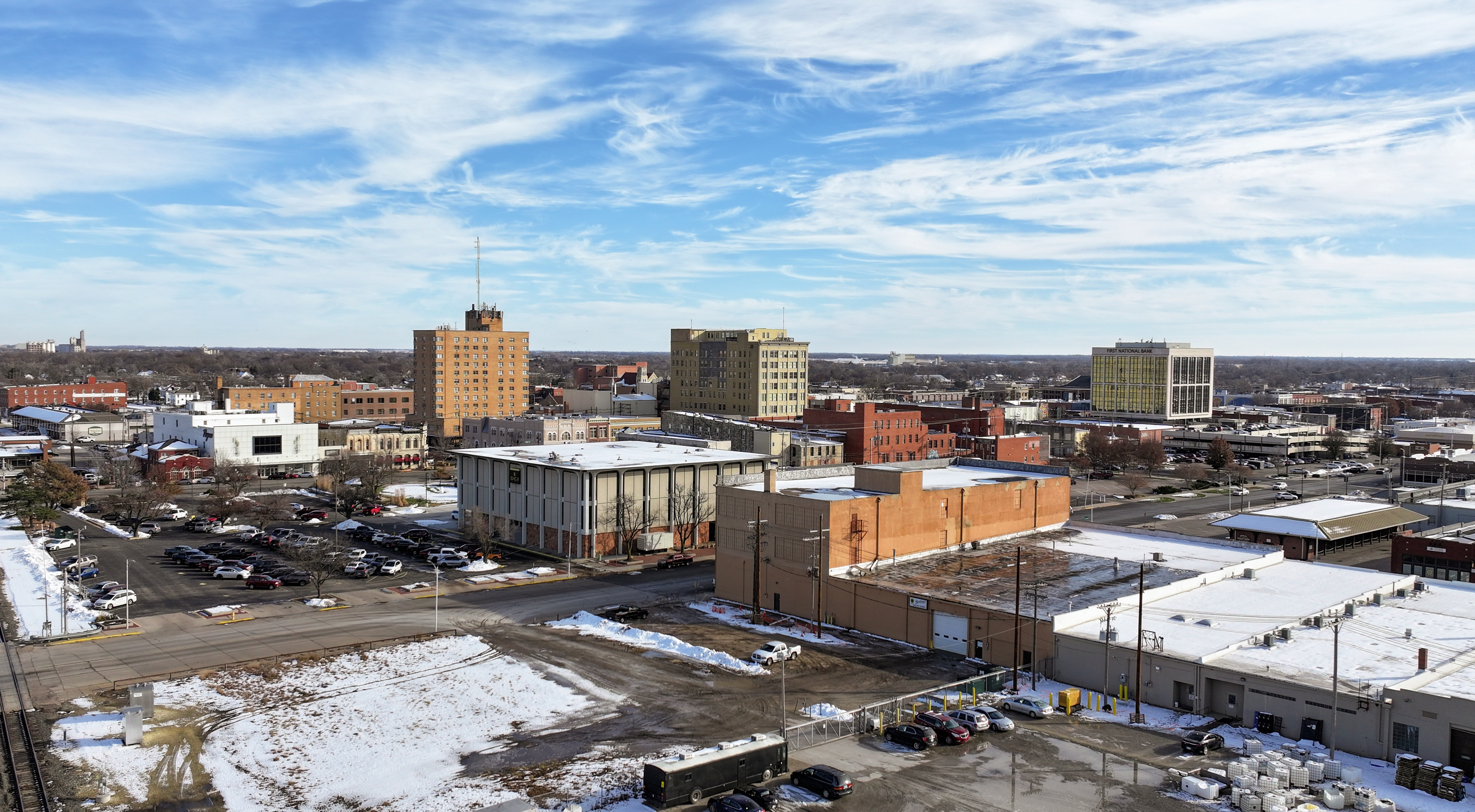
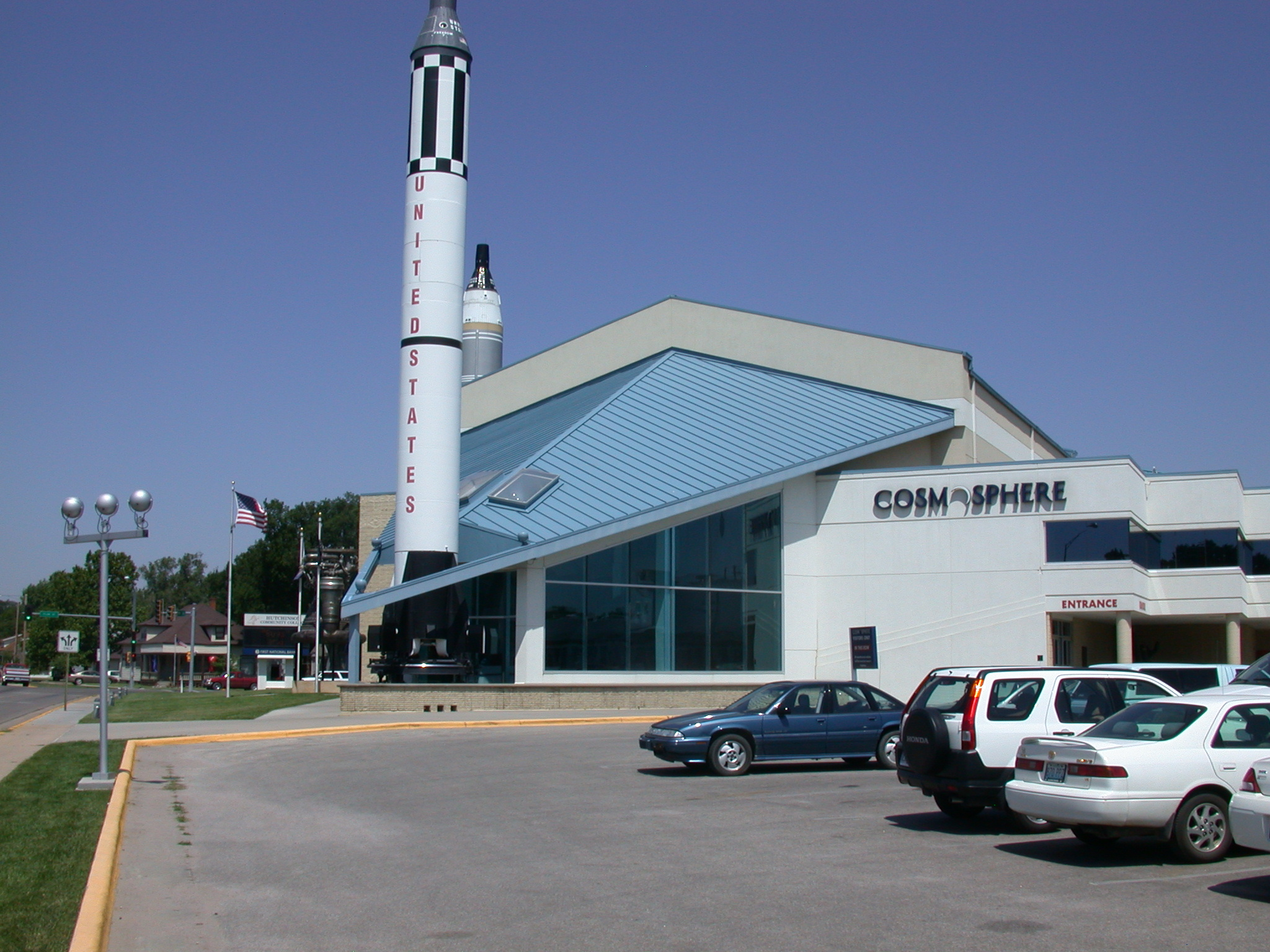
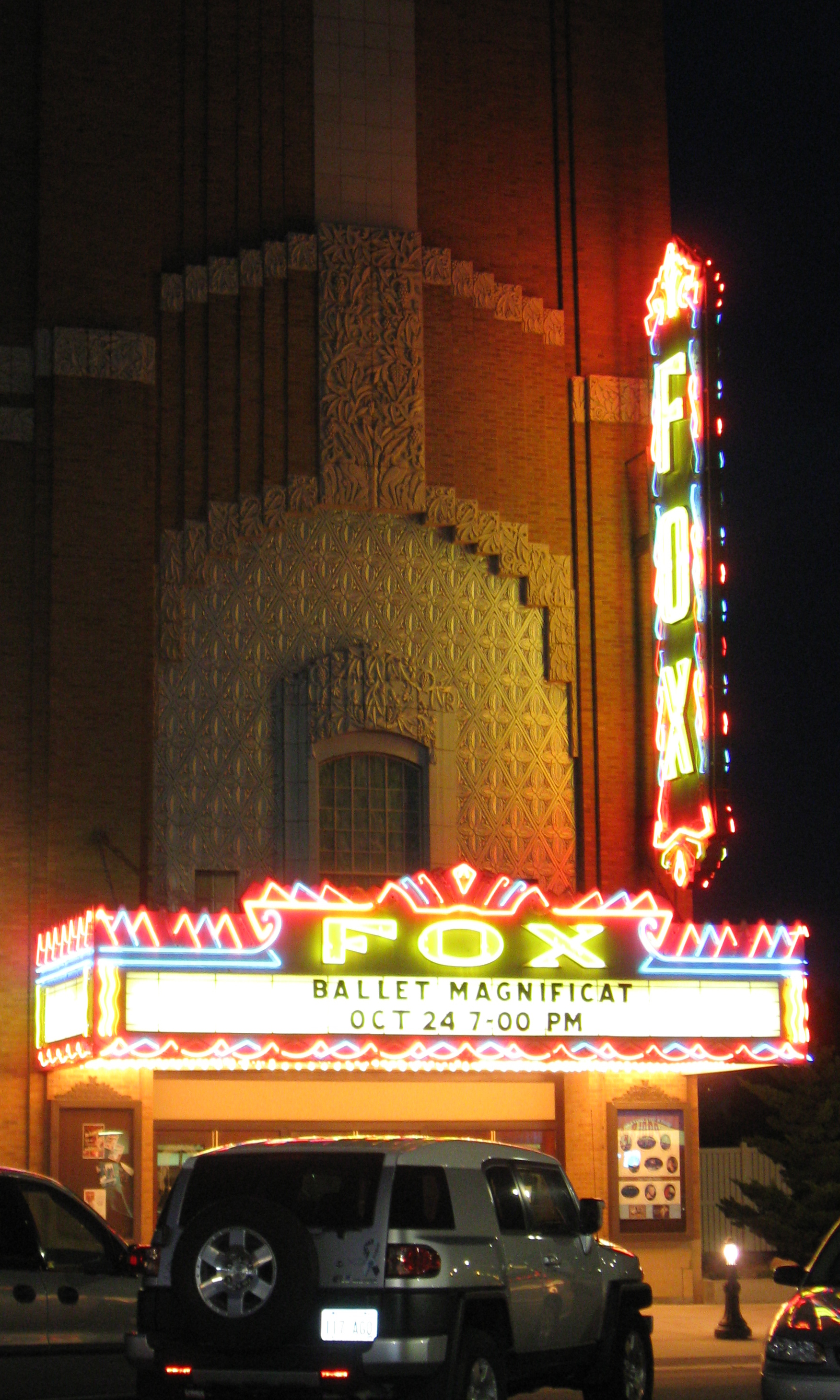
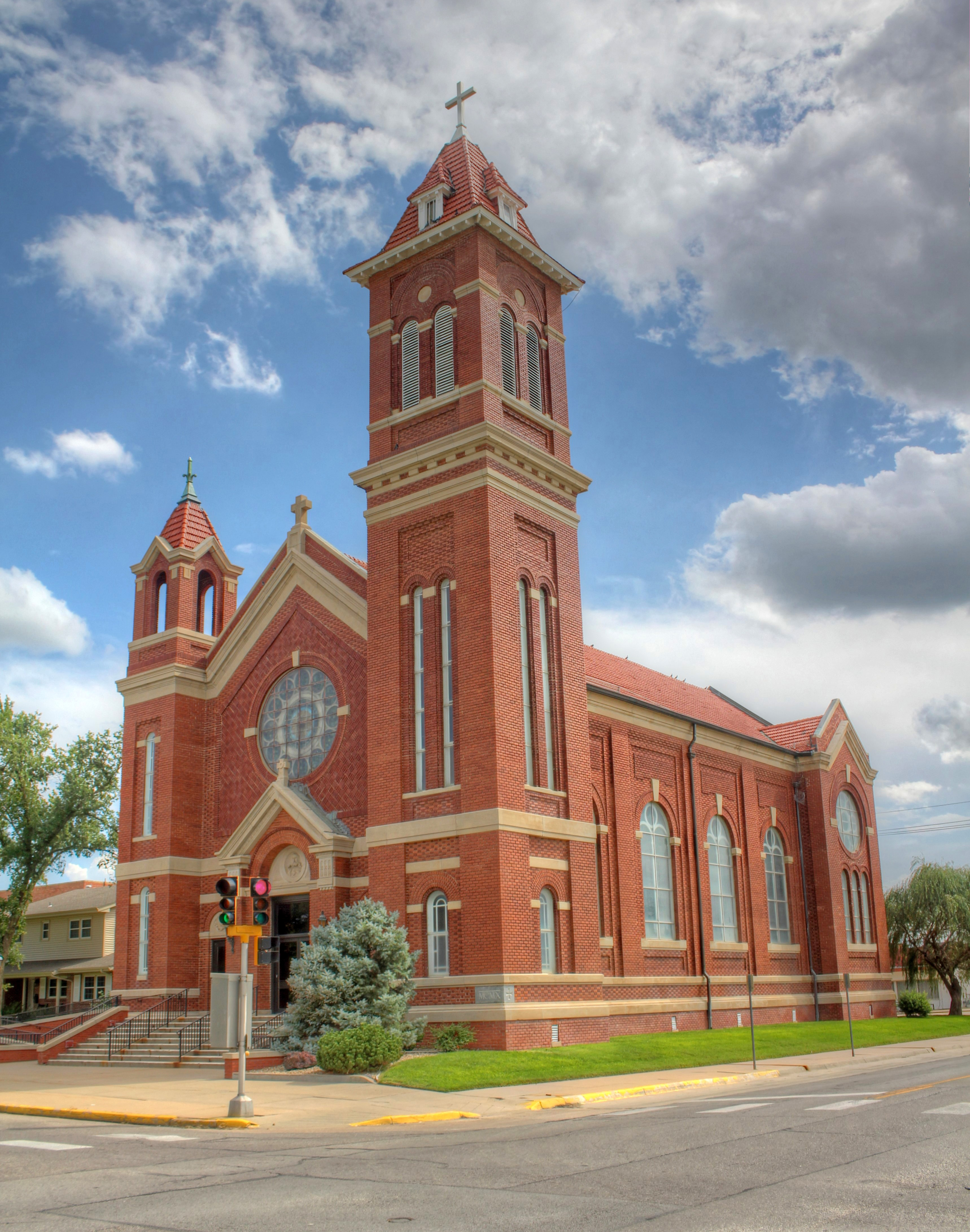
- Skyline Cosmosphere Fox Theater St. Teresa's Catholic Church

- Flag Seal
- Nicknames: "Salt City", "Hutch"
- Location within Reno County and Kansas

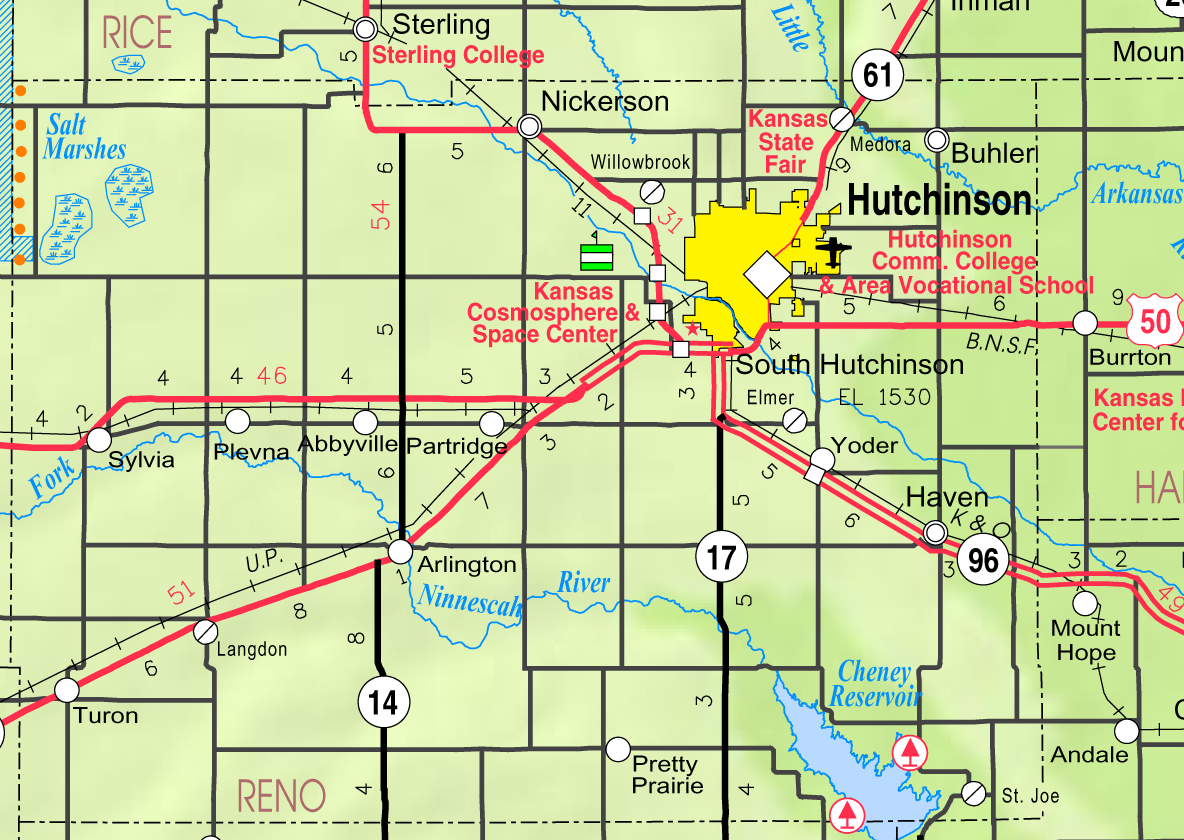
- KDOT map of Reno County (legend)
- Coordinates: 38°04′02″N 97°54′29″W
- Country: United States
- State: Kansas
- County: Reno
- Founded: 1871
- Incorporated: 1872
- Named for: C.C. Hutchinson

Government
  - Type: Mayor–Council
  - Mayor: Stacy Goss

Area
  - Total: 24.63 sq mi (63.80 km^{2})
  - Land: 24.58 sq mi (63.66 km^{2})
  - Water: 0.054 sq mi (0.14 km^{2})
- Elevation: 1,526 ft (465 m)

Population (2020)
  - Total: 40,006
  - Density: 1,628/sq mi (628.4/km^{2})
- Time zone: UTC-6 (CST)
  - Summer (DST): UTC-5 (CDT)
- ZIP Code: 67501-67502
- Area code: 620
- FIPS code: 20-33625
- GNIS ID: 485597
- Website: hutchinsonks.gov

Hutchinson is the largest city in and the county seat of Reno County, Kansas, United States, and located along the Arkansas River. As of the 2020 census, the population of the city was 40,006. It has been home to salt mines since 1887, thus its nickname of "Salt City". Each year, Hutchinson hosts the Kansas State Fair, and National Junior College Athletic Association (NJCAA) Men's Basketball Tournament. It is the home of the Hutchinson Community College, the Cosmosphere aerospace museum, and Strataca underground salt museum.

== History ==
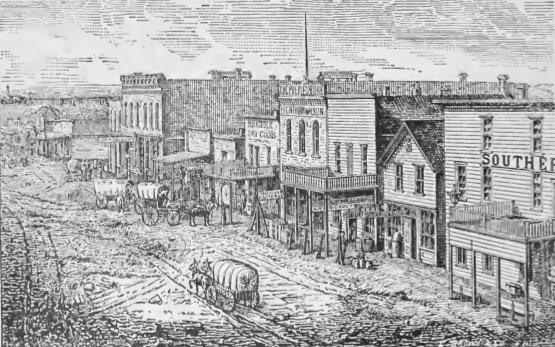
Hutchinson in the 1880s

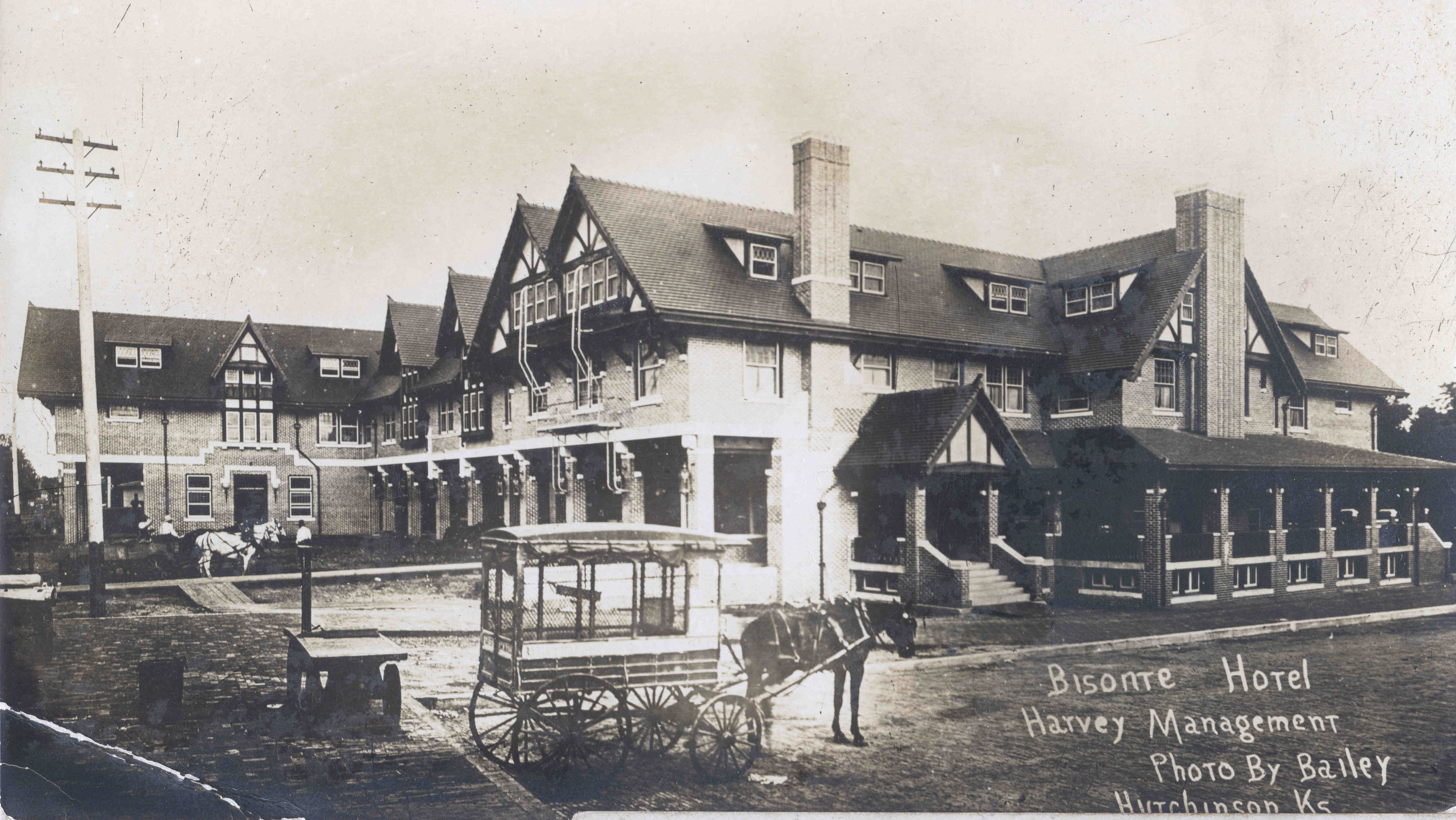
The Bisonte Hotel, built in 1906 and closed in 1946. It was the Harvey House and Santa Fe Railroad station in Hutchinson.

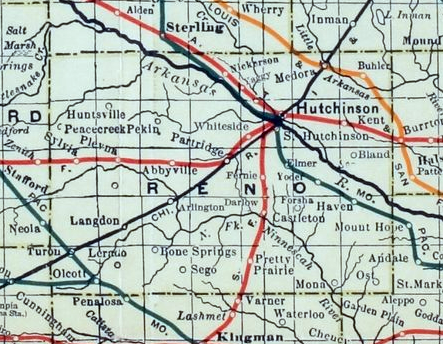
1915 railroad map of Reno County

The city of Hutchinson was founded in 1871 when frontiersman Clinton "C.C." Hutchinson contracted with the Santa Fe Railway to make a town at the railroad's crossing over the Arkansas River. The town actually sprang up about one-half mile north, on the banks of Cow Creek, where a few houses already existed. Hutchinson later founded the Reno County Bank in 1873, and by 1878 had erected the state's first water mill at Hutchinson. The community earned the nickname "Temperance City" due to the prohibition of alcohol set by its founder who placed a deed restriction on every lot prohibiting the sale or gifting of any alcoholic beverage which, if violated, would result in forfeiture of the lot, improvements, and payments associated with its sale and purchase. Hutchinson was incorporated as a third-class city in August 1872.

In 1887, the Chicago, Kansas and Nebraska Railway built a main line from Herington through Hutchinson to Pratt. In 1888, this line was extended to Liberal. Later, it was extended to Tucumcari, New Mexico and El Paso, Texas. It foreclosed in 1891 and was taken over by Chicago, Rock Island and Pacific Railway, which shut down in 1980 and reorganized as Oklahoma, Kansas and Texas Railroad, merged in 1988 with Missouri Pacific Railroad, merged in 1997 with Union Pacific Railroad. Most locals still refer to this railroad as the "Rock Island".

Also in 1887, local salt deposits were discovered for the first time, when Ben Blanchard, a land speculator who founded South Hutchinson, drilled for oil in the area. Salt mining would become a major industry in Hutchinson, with the city eventually earning the nickname "Salt City".

Hutchinson had been holding county fairs since 1873. By 1900, many referred to the Hutchinson Fair as the Kansas State Fair, even though there was no state-supported Kansas State Fair yet. In 1913, after lobbying in the Kansas Legislature, Hutchinson gifted the State of Kansas the land that became the Kansas State Fairgrounds. The official Kansas State Fair has been held in Hutchinson ever since.

In 1943, German and Italian prisoners of World War II were used in Kansas and other Midwest states as a means of solving the labor shortage caused by American men serving in the war effort. Large prisoner-of-war camps were established in Kansas: Camp Concordia, Camp Funston (at Fort Riley), Camp Phillips (at Salina under Fort Riley). Fort Riley established 12 smaller branch camps, including Hutchinson.

=== 2001 gas explosions ===
On January 17, 2001, 143 million cubic feet (4,000,000 m^{3}) of compressed natural gas leaked from the nearby Yaggy storage field. It sank underground, then rose to the surface through old brine or salt wells, making around 15 gas blowholes. An explosion in the downtown area at 10:45 am destroyed two businesses and damaged 26 others. An explosion the next day in a mobile home park killed two people. The Kansas National Guard was called in to help evacuate parts of the city because of the gas leaks, and a team of specialists checked the city for leaks after the event. These events were televised on news stations across the country.

=== Present ===
On June 21, 2013, following a grassroots campaign in an effort to promote Smallville Con, a comic-book convention hosted at the Kansas State Fair, the mayor of Hutchinson decreed the city's name would be changed to "Smallville" for one day in honor of Superman's fictional Kansas hometown of the same name. The tradition has continued annually, coinciding with the convention for two days every June.

== Geography ==
Hutchinson is located in south-central Kansas at the intersection of US 50 and K-96, Hutchinson is 39 miles (63 km) northwest of Wichita, 200 mi (320 km) west-southwest of Kansas City, and 395 miles (636 km) east-southeast of Denver.

The city lies on the northeast bank of the Arkansas River in the Great Bend Sand Prairie region of the Great Plains. Cow Creek, a tributary of the Arkansas, runs southeast through the city.

According to the United States Census Bureau, the city has a total area of 22.75 square miles (58.92 km^{2}), of which 22.69 square miles (58.77 km^{2}) is land and 0.06 square miles (0.16 km^{2}) is water.

=== Climate ===
Hutchinson has a humid subtropical climate (Köppen: Cfa), with hot, humid summers and cold, dry winters. Temperatures exceed 90 °F (32.2 °C) an average of 63.4 afternoons each year and drop below 32 °F (0 °C) an average of 119.5 mornings each year. Snowfall averages 6.9 inches (18 cm) per year. Total precipitation averages 32.93 inches (836 mm) per year. On average, January is the coolest month, July is the warmest month, and May is the wettest month. The hottest temperature recorded in Hutchinson was 113 °F (45 °C) on July 27, 2011; the coldest temperature recorded was −19 °F (−28.3 °C) on February 16, 2021.

Climate data for Hutchinson, Kansas (Hutchinson Municipal Airport), 1991–2020 normals; extremes 1948–present
Month	Jan	Feb	Mar	Apr	May	Jun	Jul	Aug	Sep	Oct	Nov	Dec	Year
Record high °F (°C)	77 (25)	86 (30)	97 (36)	98 (37)	102 (39)	109 (43)	113 (45)	112 (44)	107 (42)	97 (36)	88 (31)	82 (28)	113 (45)
Mean maximum °F (°C)	67.7 (19.8)	71.7 (22.1)	81.3 (27.4)	88.2 (31.2)	94.2 (34.6)	99.6 (37.6)	104.1 (40.1)	103.0 (39.4)	98.0 (36.7)	88.6 (31.4)	76.9 (24.9)	65.7 (18.7)	105.5 (40.8)
Mean daily maximum °F (°C)	45.1 (7.3)	49.9 (9.9)	60.1 (15.6)	69.8 (21.0)	78.6 (25.9)	89.0 (31.7)	93.6 (34.2)	91.8 (33.2)	84.2 (29.0)	72.3 (22.4)	58.4 (14.7)	46.5 (8.1)	69.9 (21.1)
Daily mean °F (°C)	32.1 (0.1)	36.3 (2.4)	45.9 (7.7)	55.5 (13.1)	65.7 (18.7)	76.0 (24.4)	80.7 (27.1)	78.7 (25.9)	70.7 (21.5)	58.1 (14.5)	44.9 (7.2)	34.5 (1.4)	56.6 (13.7)
Mean daily minimum °F (°C)	19.2 (−7.1)	22.6 (−5.2)	31.6 (−0.2)	41.2 (5.1)	52.8 (11.6)	62.9 (17.2)	67.7 (19.8)	65.6 (18.7)	57.3 (14.1)	44.0 (6.7)	31.3 (−0.4)	22.5 (−5.3)	43.2 (6.3)
Mean minimum °F (°C)	0.9 (−17.3)	4.0 (−15.6)	13.1 (−10.5)	24.7 (−4.1)	36.3 (2.4)	49.5 (9.7)	56.5 (13.6)	53.8 (12.1)	40.4 (4.7)	25.5 (−3.6)	13.4 (−10.3)	4.2 (−15.4)	−4.4 (−20.2)
Record low °F (°C)	−14 (−26)	−19 (−28)	−9 (−23)	15 (−9)	28 (−2)	39 (4)	48 (9)	47 (8)	31 (−1)	13 (−11)	2 (−17)	−13 (−25)	−19 (−28)
Average precipitation inches (mm)	0.84 (21)	1.25 (32)	2.34 (59)	2.65 (67)	5.52 (140)	4.46 (113)	4.03 (102)	4.11 (104)	2.39 (61)	2.50 (64)	1.46 (37)	1.38 (35)	32.93 (835)
Average snowfall inches (cm)	1.4 (3.6)	2.4 (6.1)	0.9 (2.3)	0.3 (0.76)	0.0 (0.0)	0.0 (0.0)	0.0 (0.0)	0.0 (0.0)	0.0 (0.0)	0.1 (0.25)	0.6 (1.5)	1.2 (3.0)	6.9 (17.51)
Average precipitation days (≥ 0.01 in)	4.5	5.2	6.9	9.0	9.6	8.5	7.9	8.2	6.9	6.9	4.6	4.2	82.4
Average snowy days (≥ 0.1 in)	1.6	1.7	0.7	0.6	0.0	0.0	0.0	0.0	0.0	0.2	0.8	1.3	6.9
Source 1: NOAA
Source 2: National Weather Service

== Demographics ==
Historical population
Census	Pop.	Note	%±
1880	1,540		—
1890	8,682		463.8%
1900	9,379		8.0%
1910	16,364		74.5%
1920	23,298		42.4%
1930	27,085		16.3%
1940	30,013		10.8%
1950	33,575		11.9%
1960	37,574		11.9%
1970	36,885		−1.8%
1980	40,284		9.2%
1990	39,308		−2.4%
2000	40,787		3.8%
2010	42,080		3.2%
2020	40,006		−4.9%
2023 (est.)	39,662		−0.9%
U.S. Decennial Census; 2010-2020

=== 2020 census ===
As of the 2020 census, Hutchinson had a population of 40,006, with 16,535 households and 9,708 families. The population density was 1,627.7 per square mile (628.4/km^{2}). There were 18,609 housing units at an average density of 757.1 per square mile (292.3/km^{2}), and 11.1% of housing units were vacant; the homeowner vacancy rate was 2.8% and the rental vacancy rate was 11.3%.

99.4% of residents lived in urban areas, while 0.6% lived in rural areas.

Racial composition as of the 2020 census
Race	Number	Percent
White	32,686	81.7%
Black or African American	1,703	4.3%
American Indian and Alaska Native	388	1.0%
Asian	280	0.7%
Native Hawaiian and Other Pacific Islander	29	0.1%
Some other race	1,505	3.8%
Two or more races	3,415	8.5%
Hispanic or Latino (of any race)	5,172	12.9%

The median age was 39.8 years; 21.1% of residents were under 18, 9.5% were 18 to 24, 25.6% were 25 to 44, 24.3% were 45 to 64, and 19.5% were 65 years of age or older. For every 100 females there were 103.1 males, and for every 100 females age 18 and over there were 103.1 males age 18 and over.

Among the 16,535 households, 26.3% had children under the age of 18 living in them. Of all households, 41.2% were married-couple households, 21.3% had a male householder with no spouse or partner present, and 30.1% had a female householder with no spouse or partner present. About 34.8% of households consisted of individuals and 15.5% had someone living alone who was 65 years of age or older. The average household size was 2.4 and the average family size was 3.0.

An estimated 14.4% of residents held a bachelor's degree or higher.

The 2016-2020 5-year American Community Survey estimates show that the median household income was $48,889 (with a margin of error of +/- $2,113) and the median family income was $62,975 (+/- $4,685). Males had a median income of $32,099 (+/- $2,156) versus $25,329 (+/- $1,028) for females. The median income for those above 16 years old was $27,346 (+/- $1,108). Approximately, 8.4% of families and 14.0% of the population were below the poverty line, including 18.0% of those under the age of 18 and 8.9% of those ages 65 or over.

=== 2010 census ===
As of the 2010 United States census, there were 42,080 people, 16,981 households, and 10,352 families residing in the city. The population density was 1,854.6 inhabitants per square mile (716.1/km^{2}). There were 18,580 housing units at an average density of 818.9 per square mile (316.2/km^{2}). The racial makeup of the city was 87.9% White, 4.3% African American, 0.7% American Indian, 0.6% Asian, 3.4% from other races, and 3.2% from two or more races. Hispanics and Latinos of any race were 10.6% of the population.

There were 16,981 households, of which 29.3% had children under the age of 18 living with them, 44.1% were married couples living together, 12.3% had a female householder with no husband present, 4.5% had a male householder with no wife present, and 39.0% were non-families. 33.2% of all households were made up of individuals, and 13.7% had someone living alone who was 65 years of age or older. The average household size was 2.31 and the average family size was 2.93.

The median age in the city was 37.8 years. 23.1% of residents were under the age of 18; 10.5% were between the ages of 18 and 24; 24.4% were from 25 to 44; 25.4% were from 45 to 64; and 16.6% were 65 years of age or older. The gender makeup of the city was 50.3% male and 49.7% female.

The median income for a household was $38,880, and the median income for a family was $47,336. Males had a median income of $39,442 versus $26,600 for females. The per capita income for the city was $21,050. About 12.9% of families and 15.7% of the population were below the poverty line, including 26.0% of those under age 18 and 6.9% of those age 65 or over.

== Economy ==
Salt was discovered in Reno County by Benjamin Blanchard on September 26, 1887. This gave rise to the first salt-processing plants west of the Mississippi River. Salt was originally extracted using the evaporation method by pumping water into brine wells. In 1923, the Carey Salt Company opened the only salt mine in Hutchinson, which then produced rock salt. That mine is still in use today and is now operated by Hutchinson Salt Company. Cargill and Morton Salt also have evaporative salt plants in Hutchinson.

Excavated portions of the mine are used for archival storage of movie and television masters, data tapes, and permanent business records. Underground Vaults & Storage currently houses the masters for The Wizard of Oz (1939), Gone with the Wind (1939), and Star Wars (1977), among many others.

The world's longest grain elevator was built in Hutchinson in 1961.

Dillon's grocery stores was established in Hutchinson by J.S. Dillon in the 1920s (originated in Sterling, Kansas). Dillon's merged with The Kroger Co. in 1983. The company still operates a distribution center and headquarters for Dillons and Kwik Shop in town.

The Eaton Corporation operates a hydraulics plant in Hutchinson. On August 22, 2006, Eaton announced it would keep the Hutchinson plant open because of a $1 million economic incentive from the City of Hutchinson and a $2 million incentive from the State of Kansas. 155 assembly jobs were moved to the Reynosa, Mexico plant in June 2007.

On September 2, 2008, the Hutchinson Hospital changed its name to Promise Regional Medical Center. In 2012, it changed its name again to Hutchinson Regional Medical Center.

Lowen Corporation, founded in 1950 in a converted garage behind C.W. "Mike" Lowen's house, is a provider of graphic solutions. Lowen Sign Company, Lowen Color Graphics, and Lowen Certified are located in Hutchinson.

Collins Bus Corporation resides just outside Hutchinson and is the leading small school bus manufacturer in North America.

StraightLine HDD, a leading directional drill tooling manufacturer, has a 70,000 sq ft (6,500 m^{2}). manufacturing plant in Hutchinson.

In May 2009, Siemens announced it would open its American wind turbine nacelle assembly facility in Hutchinson. The facility was expected to begin producing in 2010 and to create 400 jobs in Hutchinson.

Kuhn-Krause operates a huge manufacturing plant in Hutchinson, manufacturing agricultural equipment and housing one of two Kuhn factories in North America.

== Government ==
Hutchinson is a city of the first class with a council-manager form of government. The city council consists of five members. For purposes of representation in the council, the city is divided into four districts with one council member elected to a four-year term from each district. The fifth council member is elected at-large to a two-year term. Every year, the council selects one member to serve as mayor and another as vice-mayor. Council members are term limited and may not serve for more than one partial term plus two consecutive four-year terms. The council sets policy for the city and oversees the city manager who executes those policies. Hired by the council, the city manager serves as the city's chief administrative officer, administers the city budget, and conducts daily city business. Council meetings occur on the first and third Tuesday of each month, broadcast live on local cable channel 7.

As the county seat, Hutchinson is the administrative center of Reno County. The county courthouse is located downtown, and all departments of the county government base their operations in the city.

Hutchinson lies within Kansas's 1st U.S. Congressional District. For the purposes of representation in the Kansas Legislature, the city is located in the 34th district of the Kansas Senate and the 102nd, 104th, and 114th districts of the Kansas House of Representatives.

== Education ==
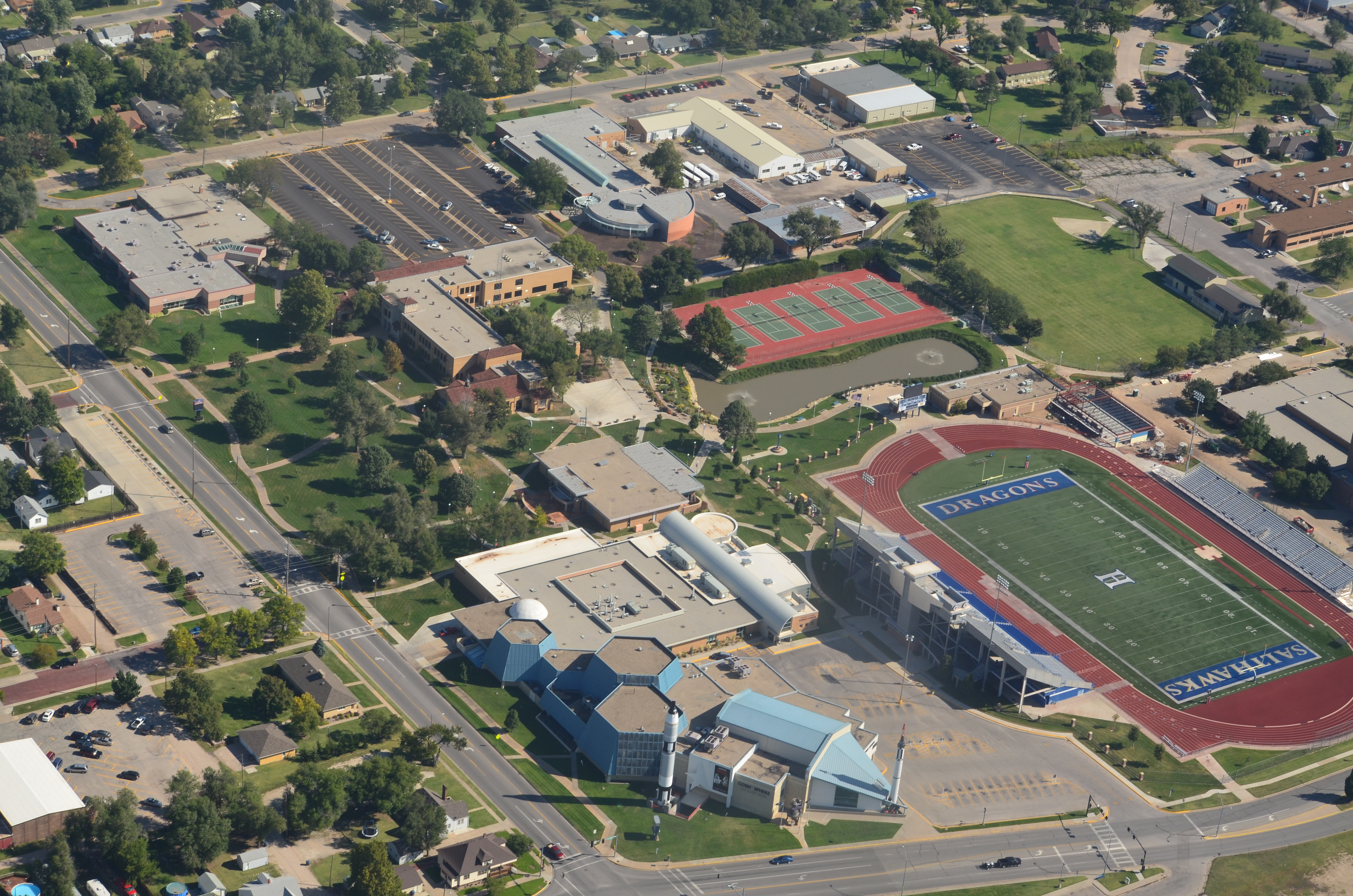
Hutchinson Community College and Cosmosphere (2014)

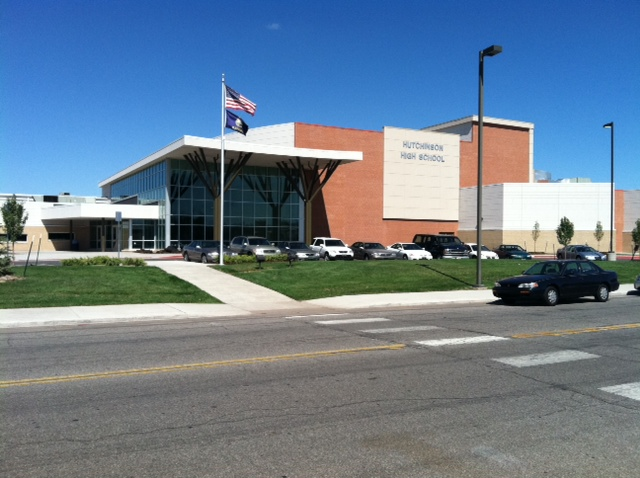
Hutchinson High School (2011)

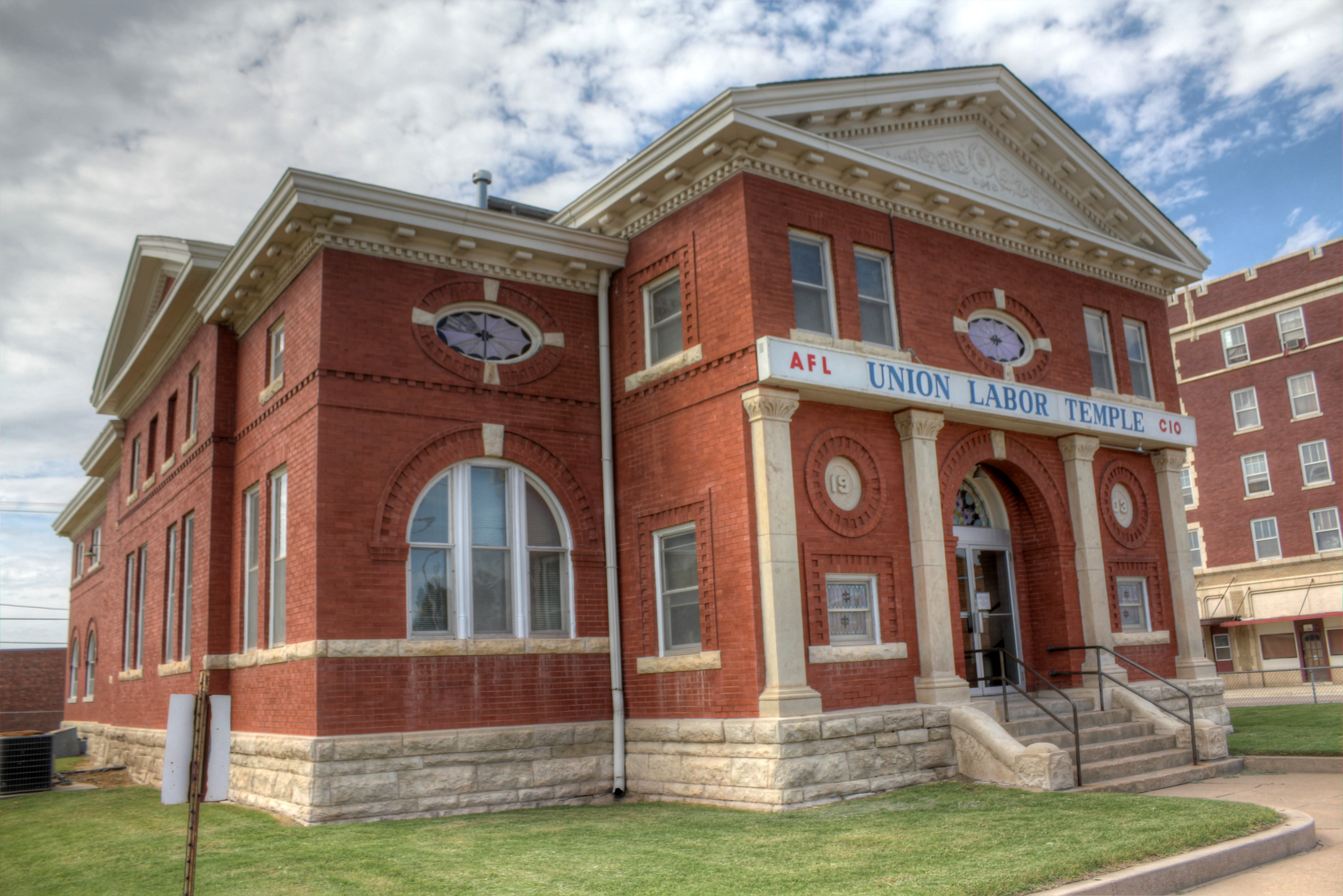
Former Hutchinson Carnegie Library (2013)

=== Colleges ===
The main campus of Hutchinson Community College, a two-year public college, is located in the city.

=== Primary and secondary ===
Three public school districts provide education for students in and around Hutchinson: USD 308, USD 309, and USD 313.

==== USD 308 ====
Hutchinson USD 308 school district operates twelve schools in the city:

- Avenue A Elementary School (grades Pre-K-6)
- Faris Elementary School (K-6)
- Graber Elementary School (K-6)
- Lincoln Elementary School (K-6)
- Magnet School at Allen (K-6)
- McCandless Elementary School (K-6)
- Morgan Elementary School (K-6)
- Wiley Elementary School (K-6)
- Hutchinson Middle School 7 (7)
- Hutchinson Middle School 8 (8)
- Hutchinson High School (9–12)
- Hutchinson Career & Technical Educational Academy

The Hutchinson High School football team (the Salthawks) has had seven straight appearances, including six straight wins, in the 6A & 5A State Championship Game.

==== USD 313 ====
Buhler USD 313 school district operates three schools in and around Hutchinson:

- Union Valley Elementary School (K-5)
- Plum Creek Elementary (K-5)
- Prairie Hills Middle School (6–8)

==== USD 309 ====
Nickerson–South Hutchinson USD 309 school district operates one school near Hutchinson:

- Reno Valley Middle School (7–8).

==== Private ====
There are also three private schools in Hutchinson:

- Central Christian School (K-12)
- Holy Cross Catholic School (Pre-K-6)
- Trinity Catholic High School (7–12)

== Infrastructure ==
=== Transportation ===
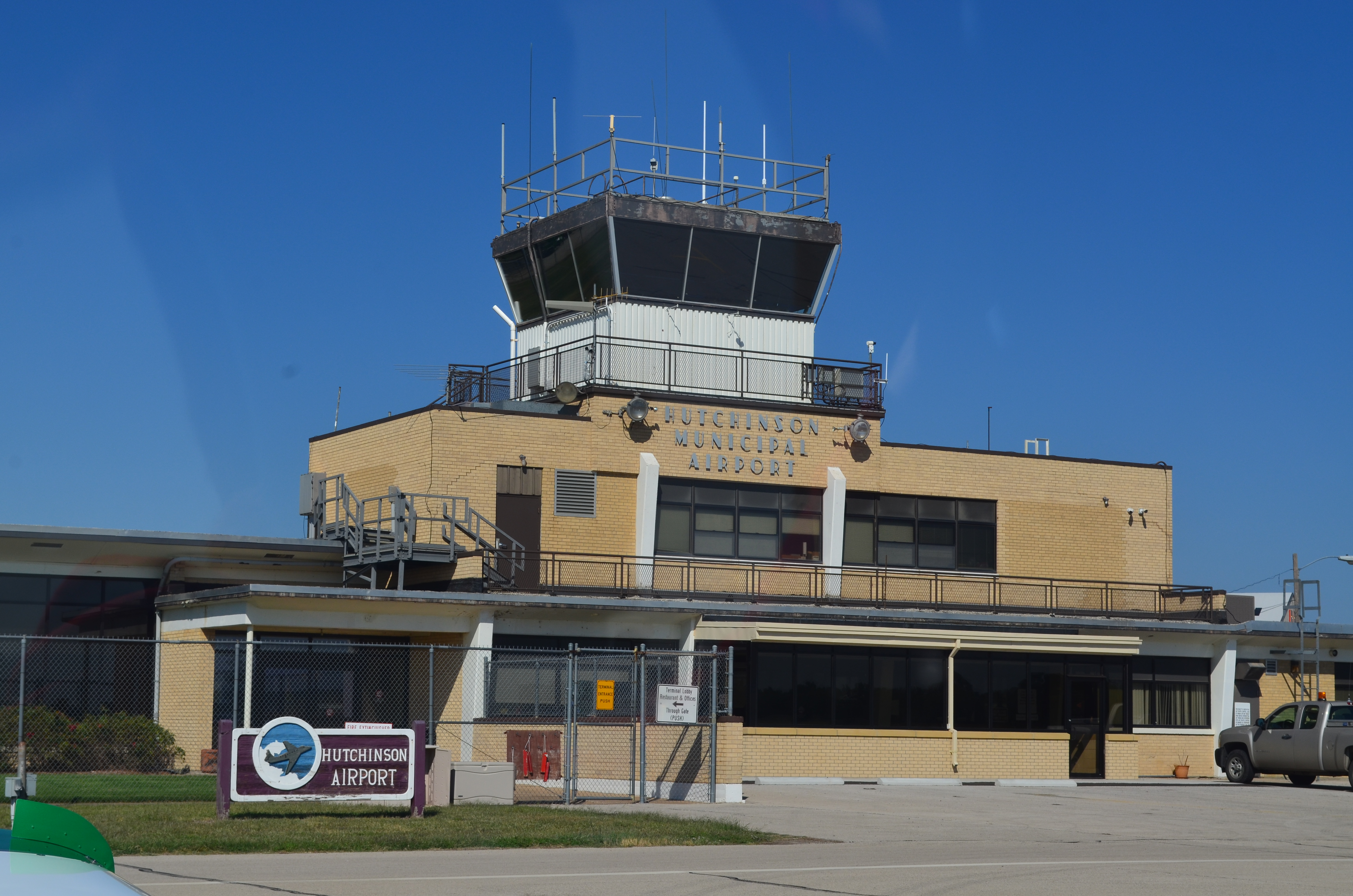
Hutchinson Municipal Airport (2014)

US 50 runs east–west south of the city. K-96 approaches Hutchinson from the south, bypasses it to the west, and then turns northwest. Coming from the west, K-61 runs concurrently with US 50, turns north and runs through the eastern part of the city, and then exits to the northeast.

Reno County Area Transit provides local public transport bus service. The agency operates three bus routes colored Red, Blue, and Yellow. Greyhound Lines offers long-distance bus service on its route through Hutchinson from Wichita to Pueblo. Bus service is provided daily towards Wichita and Salina by BeeLine Express (subcontractor of Greyhound Lines).

Hutchinson Municipal Airport is located on the eastern side of the city. The airport is primarily utilized for general aviation. Therefore, residents typically use Wichita Dwight D. Eisenhower National Airport in Wichita for commercial travel.

Three railroads serve Hutchinson. One is the La Junta Subdivision of the BNSF Railway which runs east–west through the city. Amtrak uses the La Junta Subdivision to provide passenger rail service. Hutchinson is a stop on the Southwest Chief, which provides daily train service between Chicago and Los Angeles. Another railroad serving Hutchinson is the Tucumcari Line of the Union Pacific Railroad, which runs northeast–southwest through the city. Lastly, Hutchinson is the terminus of two lines of the Kansas and Oklahoma Railroad: the Hutchinson Subdivision, which enters the city from the south, and the Great Bend Subdivision, which enters the city from the northwest.

=== Health care ===
There are two hospitals in Hutchinson. The larger of the two, Hutchinson Regional Medical Center, is a not-for-profit general medical and surgical facility that offers a range of services including emergency care. The other hospital is Summit Surgical, a specialized corporate surgical facility.

== Media ==
The Hutchinson News is the city's primary newspaper, published daily. In 2023 The Hutchinson Tribune was launched online to compete with The Hutchinson News and in 2025 a weekly print edition was launched.

Hutchinson is a center of broadcast media for south-central Kansas. One AM (KWBW 1450) and 12 FM radio stations are licensed to broadcast from the city.

Hutchinson is also the second principal city of the Wichita-Hutchinson, Kansas television market. The market's primary affiliates of CBS (KWCH-DT) and Dabl (KMTW), as well as PBS member station KPTS are licensed to the city, but all three stations broadcast from Wichita.

== Parks and recreation ==
Hutchinson is home to the Prairie Dunes Country Club, a golf course frequently ranked among the best golf courses in the U.S. and has hosted several United States Golf Association national championship tournaments. The club was founded by Emerson Carey and his four sons in the mid-1930s. The course was designed by Perry Maxwell and the first nine holes opened on September 13, 1937. Twenty years later, in 1957, nine more holes were opened, designed by J. Press Maxwell (Perry's son). Prairie Dunes was the host of the 2002 U.S. Women's Open and 2006 U.S. Senior Open golf championships.

Located on the north eastern edge of Hutchinson is the Sand Hills State Park.

== Culture ==
=== Points of interest ===
- Kansas Cosmosphere and Space Center
- Strataca, formerly known as Kansas Underground Salt Museum
- Kansas State Fair
- Carey Park, home of the Hutchinson Zoo, Carey Park Golf Course, and Salt City Splash outdoor aquatic center
- Hutchinson Sports Arena
- Hobart-Detter Field
- Arkansas Valley Interurban Railway

=== National Register of Historic Places listings ===
- Fox Theater
- Terminal Station
- St. Teresa's Catholic Church

=== In popular culture and the arts ===
==== Film ====
- Wait till the Sun Shines, Nellie (1952)
- Picnic (1955)
- Mysterious Skin (2004)
- Salvation U.S.A. (2013), directed by Brett Donowho and Bernie Van De Yacht, was shot in Hutchinson.

==== Television ====
- Modern Marvels', Season 17 Episode 7 (time code: 29:40 - 34:26, first aired October 12, 2010), contained a segment on the Hutchinson Salt Mine.
- History Channel "Gas Explosion", 17 min segment on the Hutchinson Gas Explosion of 2001.
