= Canton Bridge Company =

Former American bridge-building firm

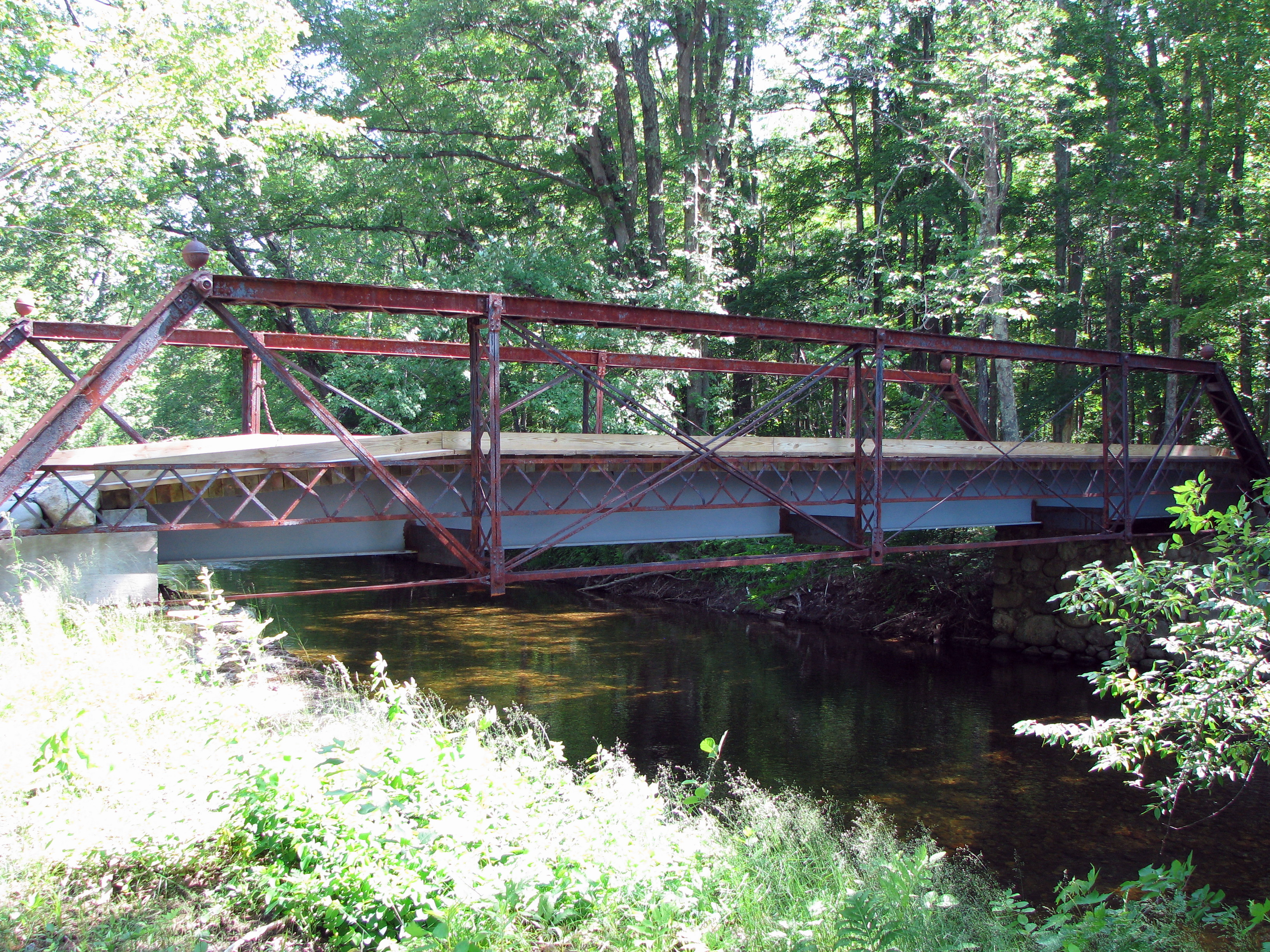
Ranney Bridge, in Keene Valley, New York

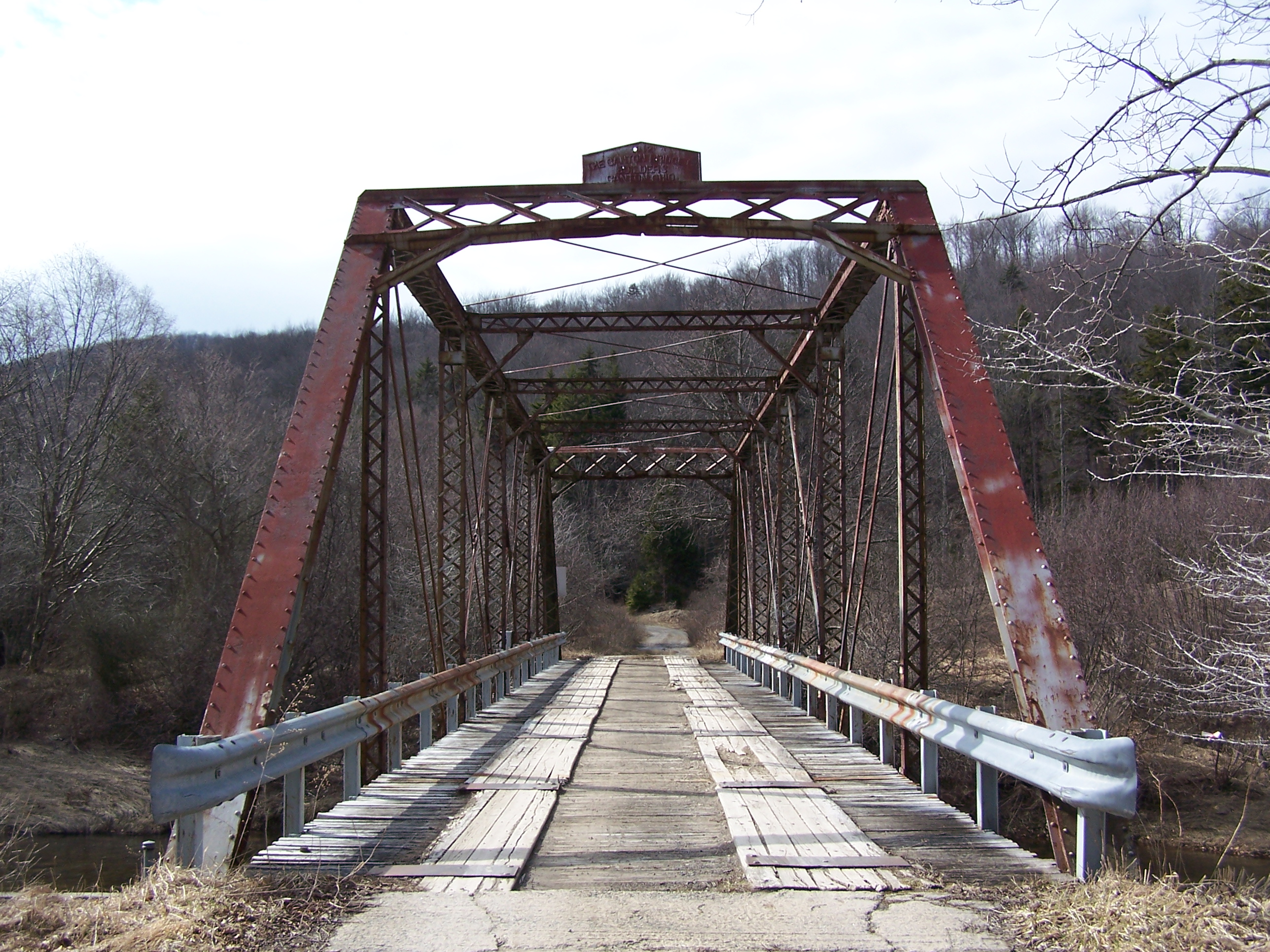
Cheat Bridge, West Virginia

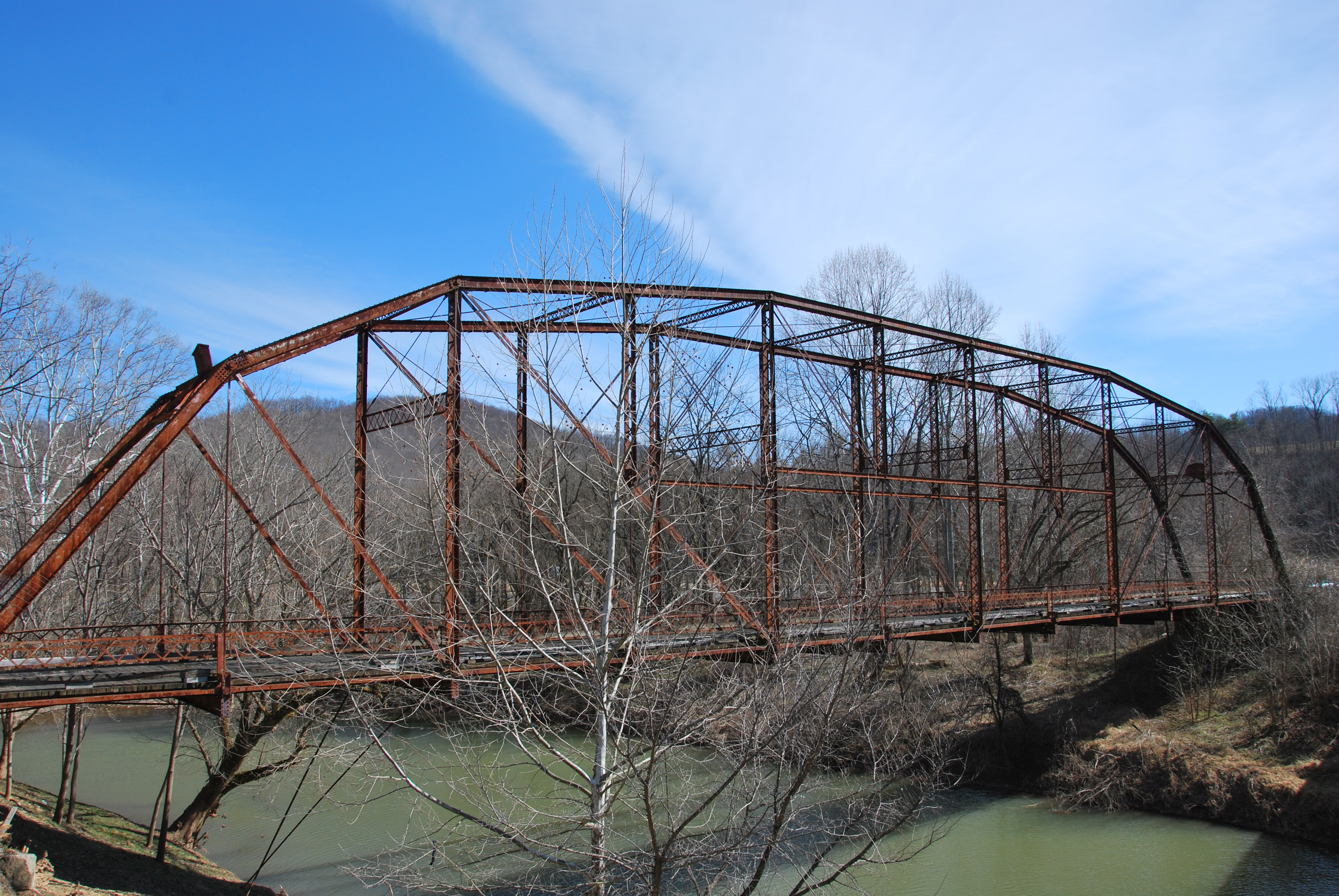
Stouts Mill Bridge, in Stouts Mill, West Virginia

Canton Bridge Company was a firm that was later incorporated into the American Bridge Company. The firm was established in Canton, Ohio, in 1892 and became one of the nation's biggest bridge-builders during the early 20th century. It designed and/or built many bridges that later became listed on the U.S. National Register of Historic Places (NRHP).

== History ==
The Canton Bridge Company was founded in 1892 by Canton native John R. Reed. He was born in 1862 and as a young man was trained in publishing and got a job working for Canton's first daily newspaper in 1878. In 1880 he came to work for the Wrought Iron Bridge Company in Canton where he gained enough insight in the bridge construction trade to go into business for himself in 1892. His company soon became one of the largest bridge builders in the country. Mr. Reed left the company and moved to Joplin, Missouri in 1900 to work for the rival Massillon Bridge and Structural Company which was headquartered there.

== Notable bridges ==
Notable bridges built by the firm include many that are NRHP-listed (and which then usually are still surviving). Others, not listed on the NRHP, also survive, including the Cheat Bridge, in West Virginia. There are three bridges in Christian County, Missouri that still survive near the town of Ozark, Missouri. They are known as Red Bridge, Green Bridge, and Riverside Bridge. NOTE: Riverside Bridge has been condemned a closed bridge in 2010 because of safety issues from flooding and vehicle accidents impairing the bridge's safety.

Notable ones (by state then city):

- Wilson Pratt Truss Bridge, 2.9 m. W. of Rain Rd. on 3200 Ave., Chapman, Kansas, NRHP-listed
- Chapman Creek Pratt Truss Bridge, Quail Rd., 1.7 mi. S of int. with KS 18, 2.5 mi. N of Chapman, Chapman, Kansas, NRHP-listed
- Sand Cree Truss Leg Bedstead Bridge, Rd. Y, 0.5 mi. W of int with KS 283, 2 mi. N of KS 9 and 6 mi. NE of Lenora, Lenora, Kansas, NRHP-listed
- North Fork Solomon River Lattice Truss Bridge, Rd. W&, 0.1 mi. S of int with Rd. BB, 1.5 mi. W of Lenora, Lenora, Kansas, NRHP-listed
- Battle Creek King Post Truss Bridge, W. Eagle Rd., 3.0 mi. E of jct. with Washington Rd., Long Island, Kansas, NRHP-listed
- Jack Creek Kingpost, SE of Long Island, Long Island, Kansas, NRHP-listed
- West Sappa Creek Lattice, NW of Norton over West Sappa Creek, Norton, Kansas, NRHP-listed
- Four Mile Creek Lattice, over Four Mile Creek, SE of Wilsey, Wilsey, Kansas, NRHP-listed
- Swan Creek Bridge, N of Forsyth, Forsyth, Missouri, NRHP-listed
- Turkey Creek Bridge, Co. Rd. over Turkey Creek, 2 mi. W and 1 mi. S of Ragan, Ragan, Nebraska, NRHP-listed
- Willow Creek Bridge, Co. Rd. over Willow Cr., 6.5 mi. S of Foster, Foster, Nebraska, NRHP-listed
- Canton Bridge Company Bridge over an artificial pool by the Great Platte River Road Archway Monument in Kearney, Nebraska.
- Adamson Bridge, NE 97 over the Niobrara River, 7.8 mi. SW of Valentine, Nebraska, NRHP-listed
- Bell Bridge, Co. Rd. over the Niobrara R., 11.9 mi. NE of Valentine, Valentine, Nebraska, NRHP-listed
- Big Blue River Bridge, Twp. Rd. over Big Blue River, 1 mi. SE of Surprise, Surprise, Nebraska, NRHP-listed
- Borman Bridge, Co. Rd. over the Niobrara River, 2.3 mi. SE of Valentine, Valentine, Nebraska, NRHP-listed
- Ranney Bridge, Private Rd. off NY 73 over East Branch of AuSable River, Keene Valley, New York, NRHP-listed as built by Canton Iron Bridge Company
- Witherup Bridge, LR 60007 over Scrubgrass Creek, Kennerdell, Pennsylvania, NRHP-listed
- Vale Cut-Off Belle Fourche River Bridge, 7 mi. SW of Newell, Belle Fourche, South Dakota, NRHP-listed (Dismantled in 1980's)
- South Dakota Dept. of Transportation Bridge No. 10-109-360, Local rd. over the Diversion Dam Inlet Canal, Belle Fourche Irrigation District, Belle Fourche, South Dakota, NRHP-listed, (1906)
- South Dakota Dept. of Transportation Bridge No. 10-270-338, Viken & Hope Rd. over Horse Creek, Newell, South Dakota, NRHP-listed
- Stonelake Bridge, Stonelake & Orman Rd., Newell, South Dakota, NRHP-listed (Now resides at Newell Golf Course, 1910)
- Vale Bridge, Gammon & Dunn Rd. over Belle Fourche River, Vale, South Dakota, NRHP-listed (Gammon Bridge, 1906)
- Cheat Bridge, in Cheat Bridge, West Virginia, a metal truss bridge
- Stouts Mill Bridge, Duskcamp Rd., over Little Kanawha River, Stouts Mill, West Virginia,
- ECS Bridge over Big Goose Creek, Cty. Rd. CN3-93, Sheridan, Wyoming, NRHP-listed
- EDL Peloux Bridge, Cty. Rd. CN16-40, Buffalo, Wyoming, NRHP-listed
- EDZ Irigary Bridge, Cty. Rd. CN16-254, Sussex, Wyoming, NRHP-listed
