= National Register of Historic Places listings in Phillips County, Kansas =

Location of Phillips County in Kansas

This is a list of the National Register of Historic Places listings in Phillips County, Kansas.

This is intended to be a complete list of the properties and districts on the National Register of Historic Places in Phillips County, Kansas, United States. The locations of National Register properties and districts for which the latitude and longitude coordinates are included below, may be seen in a map.

There are 10 properties and districts listed on the National Register in the county.

This National Park Service list is complete through NPS recent listings posted October 23, 2026.

== Current listings ==
	Name on the Register	Image	Date listed	Location	City or town	Description
1	Agra Consolidated School	Agra Consolidated School	November 15, 2005 (#05001246)	941 Kansas Ave. 39°45′41″N 99°06′52″W	Agra	Now Thunder Ridge Middle School
2	Agra Lake and Park	Agra Lake and Park	June 26, 2008 (#08000616)	¼ mile north of U.S. Route 36 on the west edge of Agra. 39°45′41″N 99°07′34″W	Agra	
3	Battle Creek King Post Truss Bridge	Battle Creek King Post Truss Bridge	May 9, 2003 (#03000362)	W. Eagle Rd., 3.0 miles east of its junction with Washington Rd. 39°56′39″N 99°28′47″W	Long Island	
4	Hoff School District No. 42	Hoff School District No. 42	January 18, 2011 (#10001140)	Near intersection of E. Union Rd. and E. 1300 Rd. 39°42′50″N 99°05′05″W	Kirwin	Public Schools of Kansas MPS
5	Jack Creek Kingpost	Jack Creek Kingpost	January 4, 1990 (#89002188)	Eagle Rd east of West 600 Rd; 39°56′39″N 99°26′20″W	Long Island	
6	Kirwin City Hall	Kirwin City Hall	June 7, 2006 (#06000471)	1st and Main Sts. 39°40′23″N 99°07′20″W	Kirwin	
7	Long Island School	Long Island School	June 9, 2005 (#05000551)	Washington Street; 39°56′47″N 99°32′04″W	Long Island	
8	Phillips 66 Service Station		October 19, 2026 (#100013541)	603 State Street; 39°45′22″N 99°19′12″W	Phillipsburg	
9	Phillipsburg Community Building	Phillipsburg Community Building	October 20, 2010 (#10000845)	425 F St. 39°45′26″N 99°19′22″W	Phillipsburg	New Deal-Era Resources of Kansas MPS
10	Pleasant Ridge Church	Pleasant Ridge Church	November 5, 2005 (#05001204)	381 E. Buffalo Rd. 39°59′15″N 99°15′27″W	Phillipsburg	

== See also ==
- List of National Historic Landmarks in Kansas
- National Register of Historic Places listings in Kansas
