= Niobrara River Bridge =

Niobrara River Bridge may refer to:

- Adamson Bridge, near Valentine, Nebraska, also known as Niobrara River Bridge and as NEHBS No. CE00-227, listed on the National Register of Historic Places (NRHP) in Cherry County
- Bell Bridge, near Valentine, Nebraska, also known as the Allen Bridge and Niobrara River Bridge and NEHBS No. CE00-22, also NRHP-listed in Cherry County
- Berry State Aid Bridge, near Valentine, Nebraska, also known as Niobrara River Bridge and as NEHBS No. CE00-225, also NRHP-listed in Cherry County
- Borman Bridge, near Valentine, Nebraska, also known as Niobrara River Bridge and NEHBS No. CE00-224, also NRHP-listed in Cherry County
- Brewer Bridge, near Valentine, Nebraska, also known as Niobrara River Bridge and NEHBS No. CE00-226, built 1899, also NRHP-listed in Cherry County
- Colclesser Bridge, near Rushville, Nebraska, also NRHP-listed in Sheridan County
- Loosveldt Bridge, near Rushville, Nebraska, also NRHP-listed in Sheridan County
- Niobrara River Bridge (Niobrara State Park, Nebraska), near Niobrara, Nebraska, NRHP-listed in Knox County
