= Cambria Iron Company =

- U.S. National Register of Historic Places
- U.S. National Historic Landmark District
- Pennsylvania state historical marker
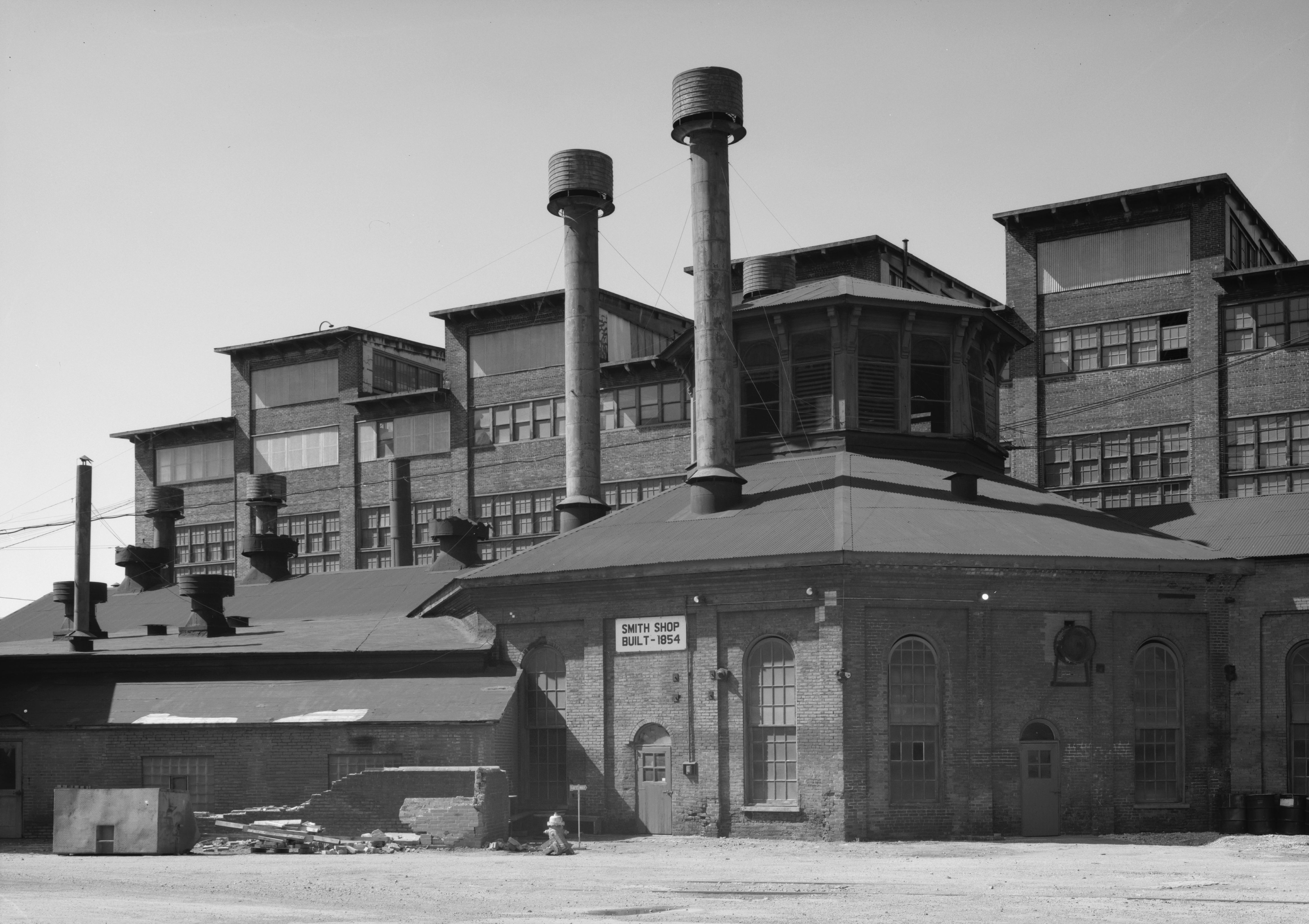
- Blacksmith Shop in 1958

- Location within Pennsylvania Location within the United States
- Location: Johnstown, Pennsylvania
- Coordinates: 40.336°N 78.923°W
- Area: 482 acres (195 ha)
- Architect: Cambria Iron Co., et al.
- NRHP reference No.: 89001101

Significant dates
- Added to NRHP: June 22, 1989
- Designated NHLD: June 22, 1989
- Designated PHMC: March 04, 1947

The Cambria Iron Company of Johnstown, Pennsylvania, was a major producer of iron and steel that operated independently from 1852 to 1916. The company adopted many innovations in the steelmaking process, including those of William Kelly and Henry Bessemer.

Founded in 1852, the company became the nation's largest steel foundry within two decades. It was reorganized and renamed the Cambria Steel Company in 1898, purchased by Midvale Steel and Ordnance Company in 1916, and sold to the Bethlehem Steel Company in 1923.

The company's facilities, which extend some 12 miles (19 km) along the Conemaugh and Little Conemaugh rivers, operated until 1992. Today, they are designated as a National Historic Landmark District. Several works by the firm are listed on the National Register of Historic Places.

== Facilities ==
The industrial facilities of the Cambria occupied five separate sites in and around Johnstown, Pennsylvania. Its earliest facilities, known as the Lower Works, are located on the east bank of the Conemaugh River, north of downtown Johnstown and the Little Conemaugh River.

The Gautier Plant is northeast of downtown Johnstown on the south side of the Little Conemaugh. Further up that river is the extensive Franklin Plant and Wheel Plant, while the Rod and Wire Plant is located on the west side of the Conemaugh River, north of the Lower Works.

Each of these facilities represents a different phase of development and growth of the steel industry. The Lower Works no longer has significant traces of the earliest facilities used in steel manufacturing. All five of these areas comprise the National Historic Landmark District designated in 1989.

== Company history ==
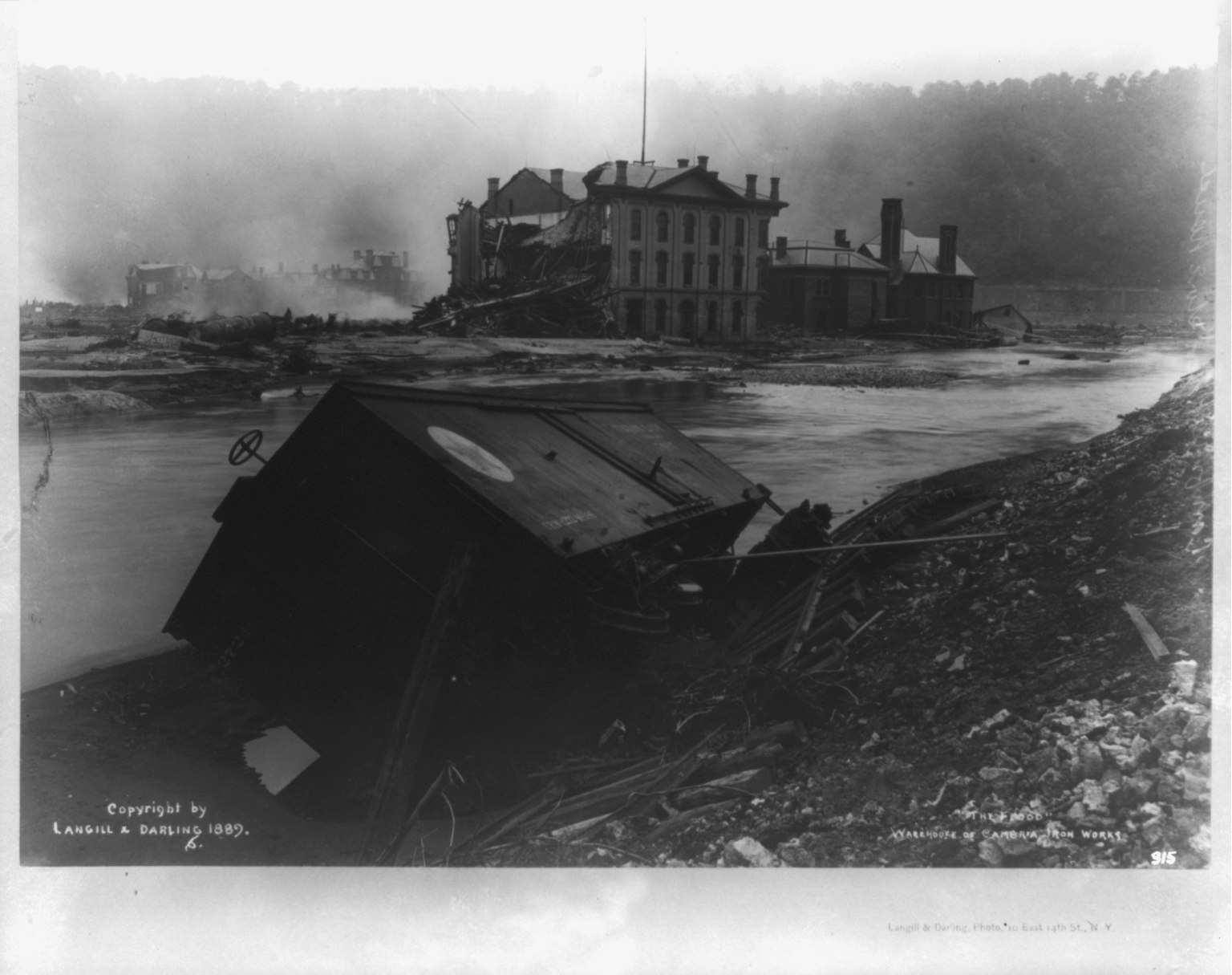
Warehouse of Cambria Iron Works after the 1889 Johnstown Flood.

The Cambria Iron Company was founded in 1852 to provide iron for the construction of railroads. In 1854, the iron works, which had gone out of the blast, were purchased by a group of Philadelphia merchants led by Matthew Newkirk. After a fire destroyed the main rolling mill in 1857, Newkirk persuaded his co-investors to rebuild it on a larger scale.

The company grew rapidly and by the 1870s, was a leading producer of steel and an innovator in the advancement of steelmaking technology. It performed early experiments with the Kelly converter, built the first blooming mill, and was one of the first plants to use hydraulics for the movement of ingots. It built one of the first plants to use the Bessemer process for making steel at a large scale. The company's innovations, methods, and processes were widely influential throughout the steel industry.

The company was at its height in the 1870s, under the long-term leadership of general manager Daniel Johnson Morrell, who had overseen the expansion of the works into one of the largest producers of rails in the United States. He helped to end US dependence on British railroad construction imports. A Republican, Morrell also served as a member of the 40th United States Congress and 41st United States Congresses from Pennsylvania, from 1867-1871.

Morrell became concerned about the South Fork Dam, which formed Lake Conemaugh above Johnstown and Cambria Iron Company's facilities. To monitor the dam, Morrell joined South Fork Fishing and Hunting Club, which owned the dam. Morrell campaigned to club officials to improve the dam, which he had inspected by his own engineers and by those of the Pennsylvania Railroad. Morrell offered to effect repairs, partially at his own expense, but was rejected by club president Benjamin F. Ruff. Morell died in 1885, his warnings unheeded.

On May 31, 1889, the dam failed, unleashing the Johnstown Flood. The flood killed more than 2,200 people—then the largest disaster in U.S. history—and badly damaged the Cambria Iron Company's facilities along the rivers. The company reopened one week later, but at reduced capacity, and it was eclipsed by other producers as it rebuilt.

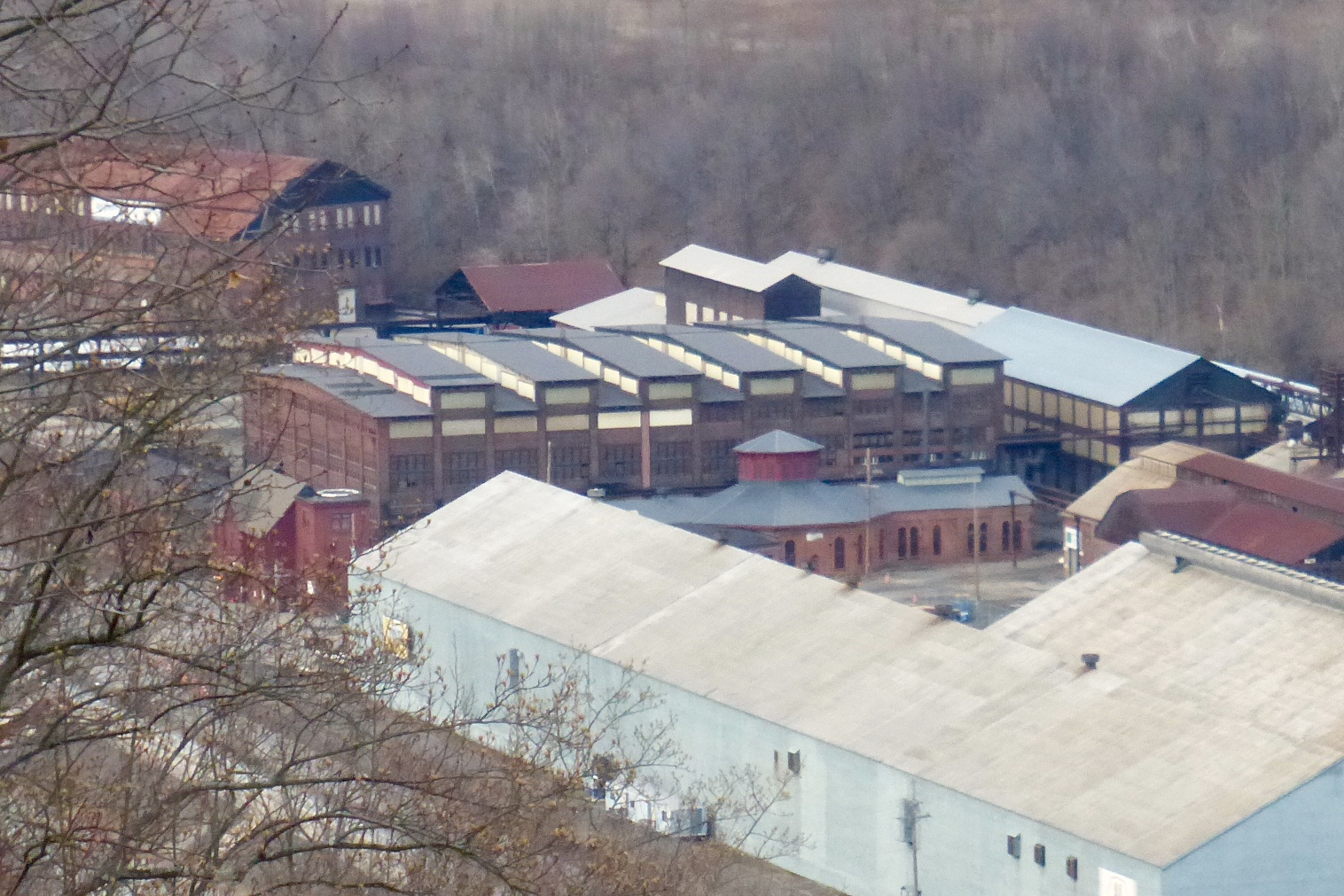
View from Westmont, Pennsylvania. Blacksmith shop (octagon roof) and machine shop (raised roof) in the center.

After Morrell's death, his club membership was purchased by Cyrus Elder, who became the club's only Johnstown native; most of the men were from Pittsburgh. Elder was a former news editor who had become chief legal counsel for Cambria Iron Company. His wife and daughter died in the flood. He continued to be a notable civic leader. He also wrote books and poetry.

In 1916, Cambria Iron was acquired by Midvale Steel and Ordnance Company. Midvale sold the company to Bethlehem Steel in 1923., It operated continuously until 1992.

Cambria Steel Company had formed a wholly-owned subsidiary shipping company called Franklin Steamship Company of Cleveland in 1906 and Beaver Steamship Company in 1916. Both companies were sold to Bethlehem Steamship Company in 1924.

== Works produced ==
Infrastructure whose parts were manufactured by the Cambria Company include the following (with variations in attribution). All have been listed on the National Register of Historic Places (NRHP):

- Bell Bridge, county road over Niobrara River, 11.9 miles (19.2 km) northeast of Valentine, Nebraska (Cambria Steel Co.), NRHP-listed
- Boone River Bridge, Buchanan Avenue over Boone River, Goldfield, Iowa (Cambria Steel Company), NRHP-listed
- Borman Bridge, county road over Niobrara River, 2.3 miles (3.7 km) southeast of Valentine, Nebraska (Cambria Steel Co.), NRHP-listed
- Eldorado Bridge, State Street over Turkey River, Eldorado, Iowa (Cambria Steel Co.), NRHP-listed
- Johnstown Inclined Railway, Johns Street and Edgehill Drive, Johnstown, Pennsylvania (Cambria Iron Co.), NRHP-listed
- Neligh Mill Bridge, Elm Street over Elkhorn River, Neligh, Nebraska (Cambria/Lackawanna Steel Cos.), NRHP-listed
- North Loup Bridge, county road over North Loup River, 1.5 miles (2.4 km) northeast of North Loup, Nebraska (Cambria & Lackawanna Steel Cos.), NRHP-listed
- Republican River Bridge, county road over Republican River, 1 mile (1.6 km) east and 1.5 miles (2.4 km) south of Riverton, Nebraska (Cambria Steel Co.), NRHP-listed
- Willow Creek Bridge, county road over Willow Creek, 6.5 miles (10.5 km) south of Foster, Nebraska (Cambria Steel Co.), NRHP-listed

== See also ==
- Rolling Mill Mine
- List of National Historic Landmarks in Pennsylvania
- National Register of Historic Places listings in Cambria County, Pennsylvania
