= Stouts Mill Bridge =

- U.S. National Register of Historic Places
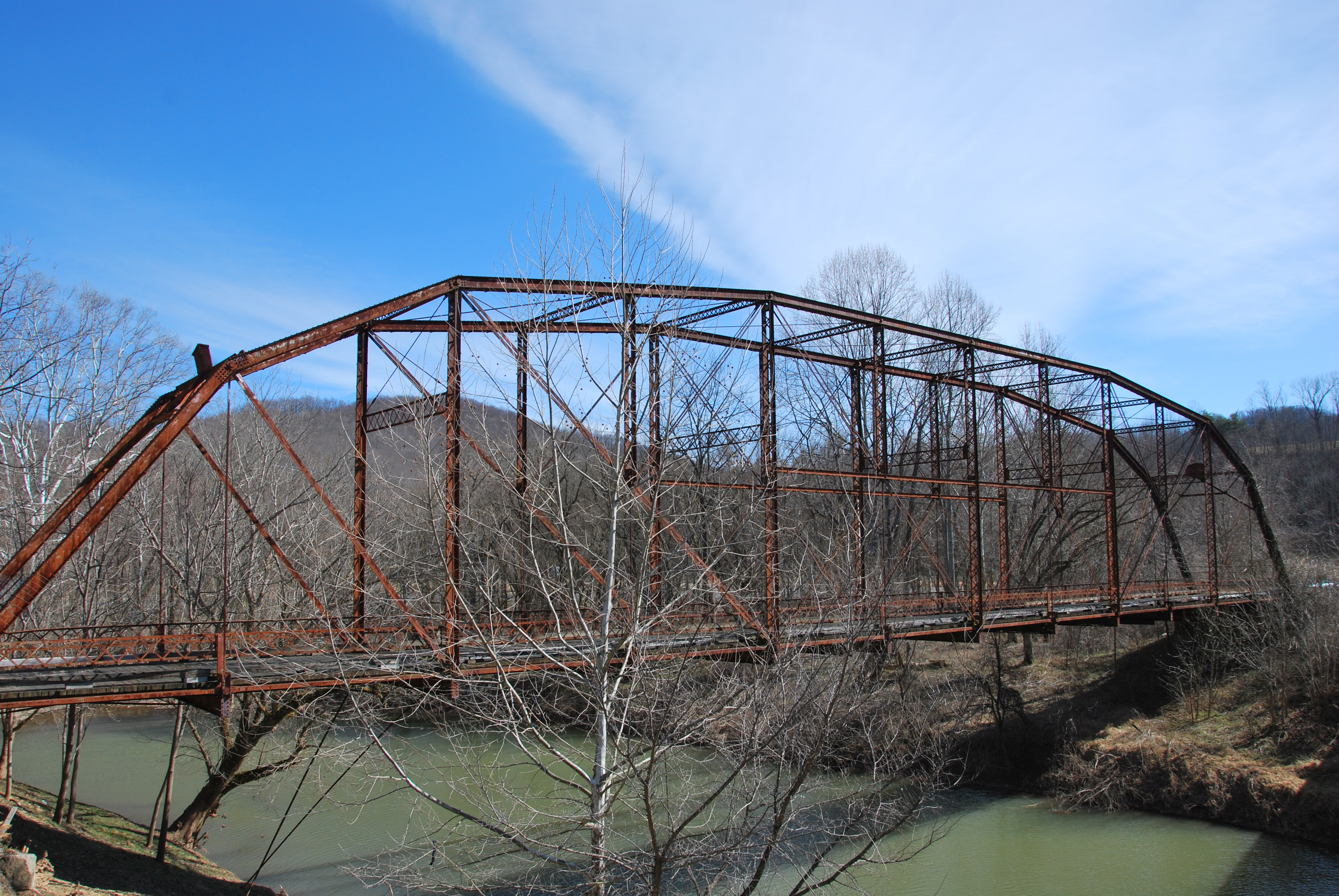
- Stouts Mill Bridge, February 2011

- Location within West Virginia Location within the United States
- Location: Duskcamp Rd., over Little Kanawha R., Stouts Mill, West Virginia
- Coordinates: 38°53′47″N 80°43′54″W
- Area: less than one acre
- Built: 1897
- Architect: Canton Bridge Co.
- Architectural style: camelback through truss
- NRHP reference No.: 98001476
- Added to NRHP: December 4, 1998

The Stouts Mill Bridge is a historic camelback through truss bridge that brings Duskcamp Rd. over Little Kanawha River in Stouts Mill, Gilmer County, West Virginia. The bridge was built in 1897. It was designed and/or built by the Canton Bridge Company.

It was listed on the National Register of Historic Places in 1998.
