= North Fork Solomon River Lattice Truss Bridge =

- U.S. National Register of Historic Places
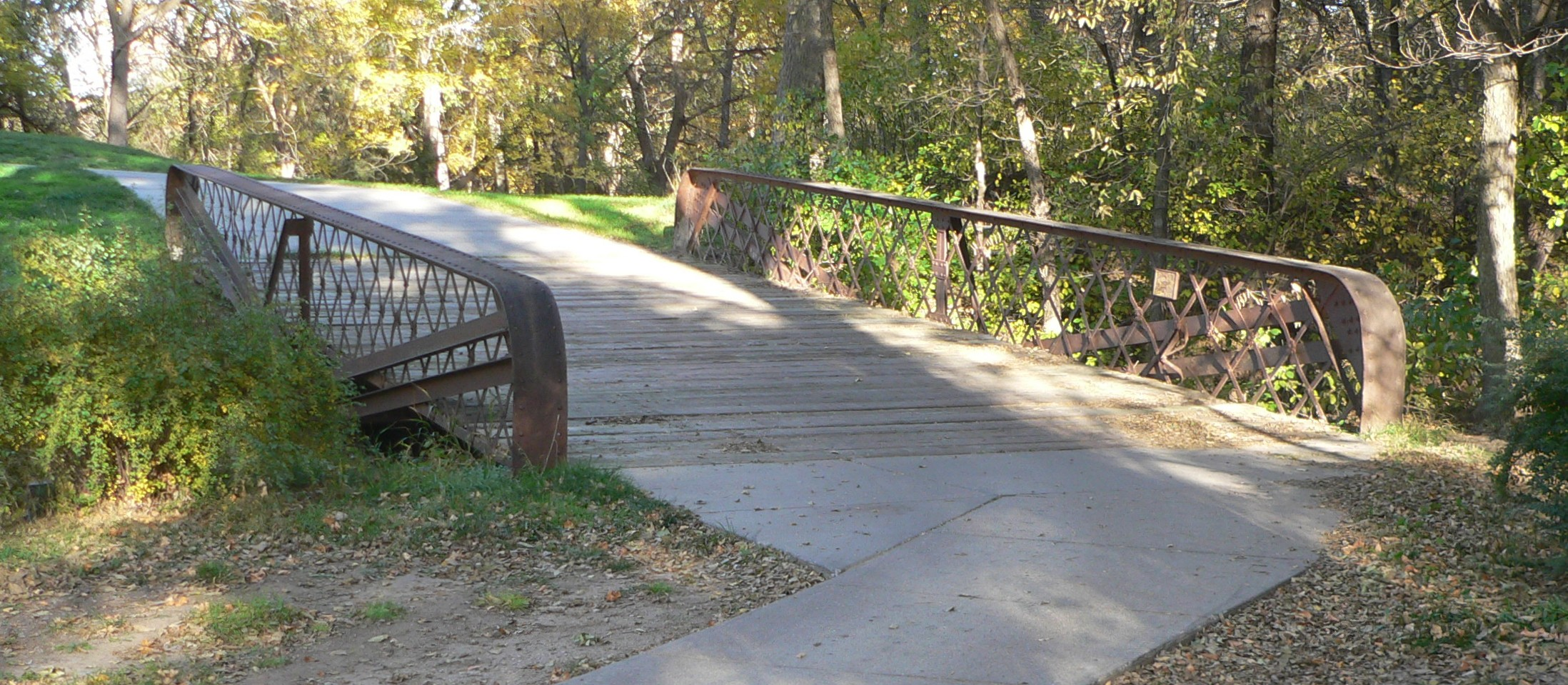
- Bridge in 2014

- Location within Kansas
- Nearest city: Norton, Kansas
- Coordinates: 39.818378°N 99.876697°W
- Area: less than one acre
- Built: 1925
- Built by: Canton Bridge Co.
- Architectural style: Lattice truss
- MPS: Metal Truss Bridges in Kansas 1861--1939 MPS
- NRHP reference No.: 03000366
- Added to NRHP: May 9, 2003

The North Fork Solomon River Lattice Truss Bridge, now located on a golf course just southeast of Norton County, Kansas, was listed on the National Register of Historic Places in 2003 when at its original location on a road near Lenora, Kansas, and its registration was updated in 2008 to address its relocation.

It is a single-span 40 feet (12 m)-long metal lattice truss bridge fabricated by the Canton Bridge Co. It now crosses a tributary of Prairie Dog Creek on the Prairie Dog Golf Course, a nine-hole golf course.

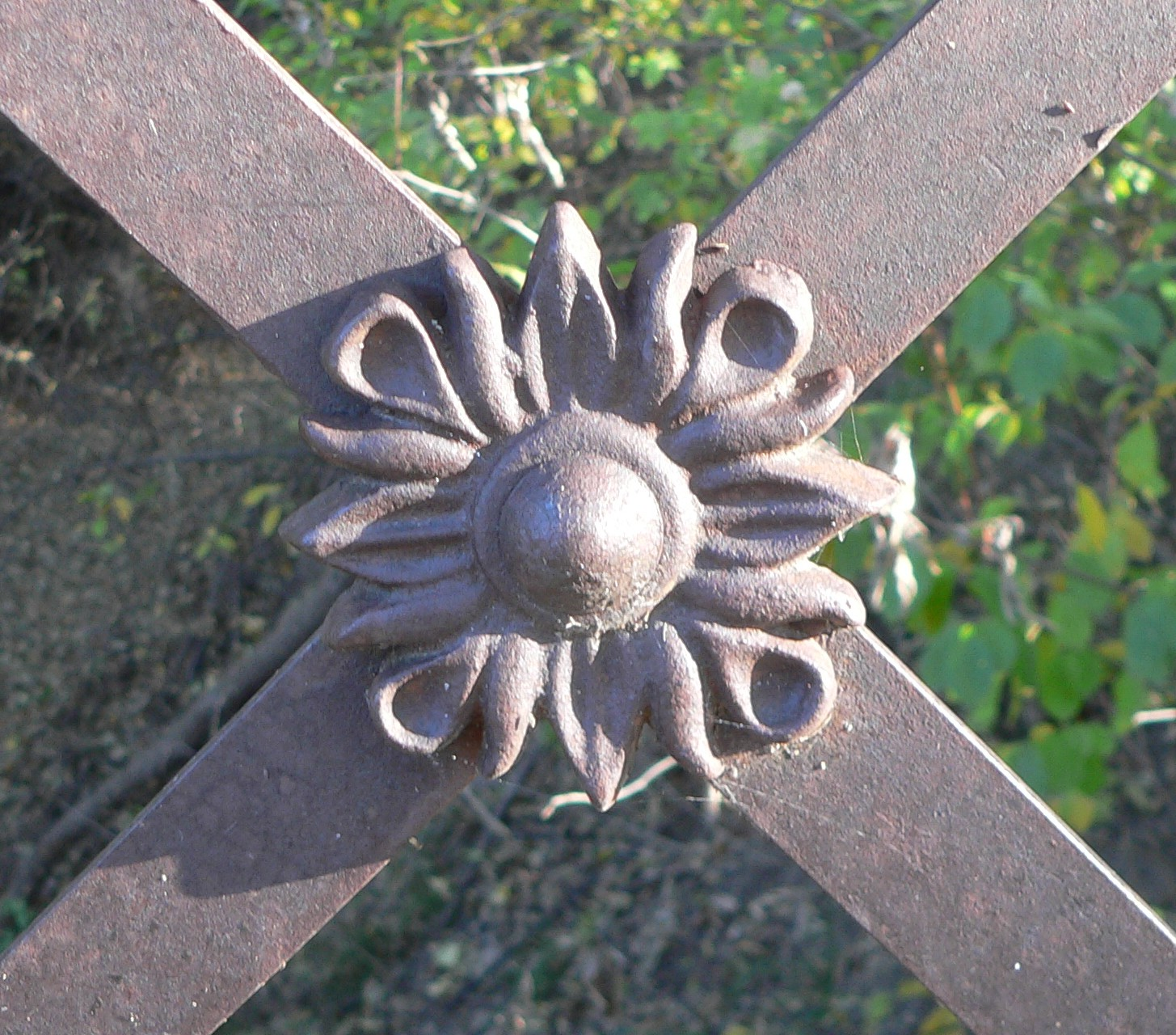
Cast iron floret decorating an intersection of its diagonal "lacing bars"

It was originally located on Road W7, approximately 0.1 miles south of its intersection with Road BB (a.k.a. 15 S), approximately 1.5 miles (2.4 km) west of the town of Lenora, at 39.60841°N 100.03028°W. When originally listed the bridge's road had little traffic and the bridge was expected to survive indefinitely.

Its listing was consistent with standards set in a study of historic metal truss bridges in Kansas.

It was moved in 2006, and its National Register registration was amended in 2008 for its proposed relocation. Its 16 feet (4.9 m) width and its load capacity were then deemed insufficient for traffic on its road.

It now serves golf carts and pedestrians traversing between holes #5 and #6 of the golf course, southeast of Norton in Norton County, Kansas.
