= ECS Bridge over Big Goose Creek =

- U.S. National Register of Historic Places
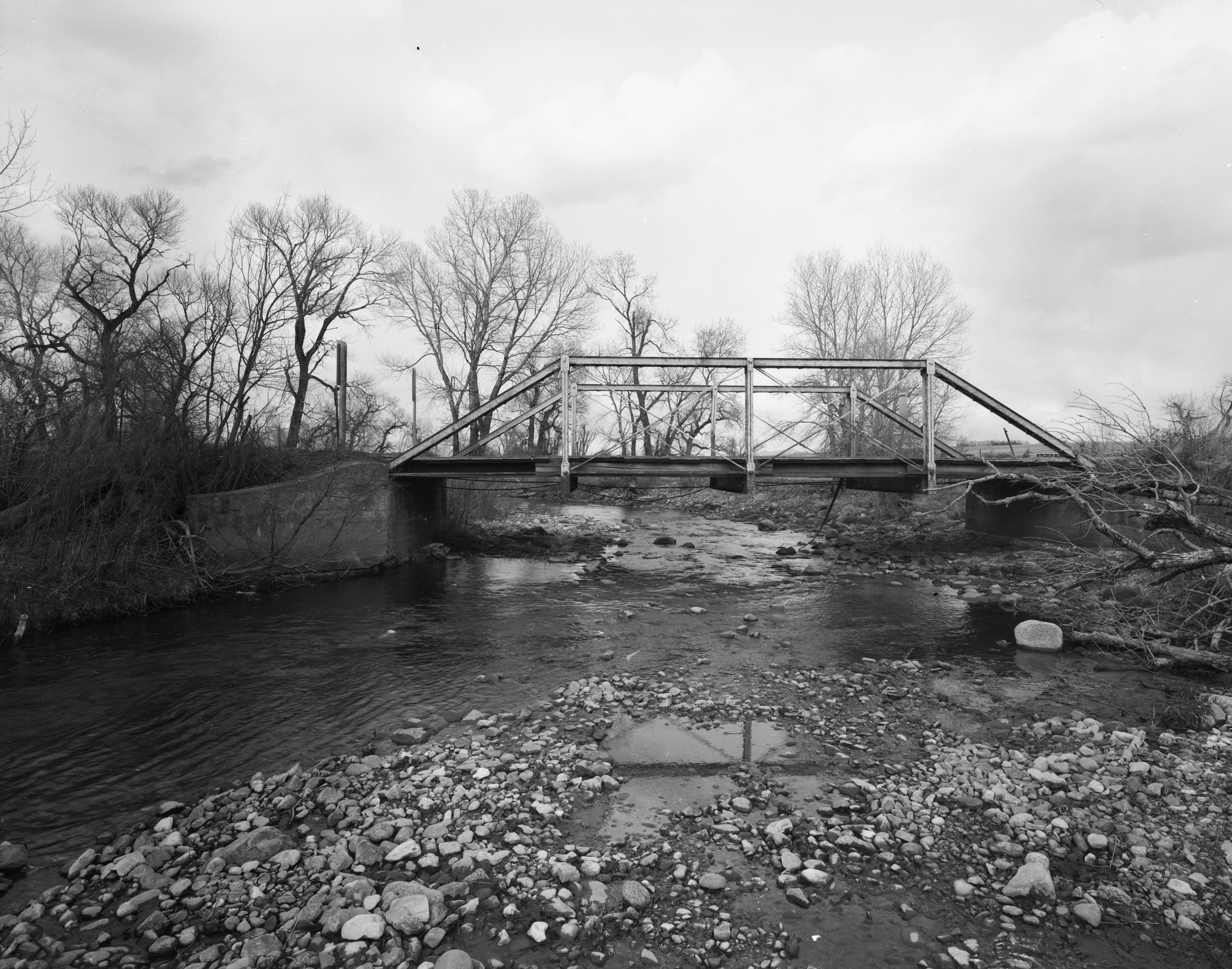

- Location within Wyoming Location within the United States
- Nearest city: Sheridan, Wyoming
- Coordinates: 44°44′35″N 107°7′45″W
- Area: less than one acre
- Built: 1913–1914
- Architect: Canton Bridge Company
- Architectural style: Pratt pony truss
- MPS: Vehicular Truss and Arch Bridges in Wyoming TR
- NRHP reference No.: 85000435
- Added to NRHP: February 22, 1985

The ECS Bridge over Big Goose Creek was a bridge near Sheridan, Wyoming, that was built in 1914. It was a Pratt pony truss bridge built by the Canton Bridge Company of Canton, Ohio. The Canton Bridge Company built four steel bridges in Wyoming in 1914; when nominated to the National Register of Historic Places in 1982, the ECS Bridge was the only one of these surviving in its original location. It was 50 feet (15 m) long and 15 feet (4.6 m) wide.

It was one of 171 Wyoming bridges surveyed in a study that led to the nomination of 31 of them for NRHP listing. The ECS bridge was listed on the National Register of Historic Places (NRHP) in 1985.

Two other Canton Bridge Company bridges in Wyoming are also listed on the NRHP:

- EDL Peloux Bridge, County Road CN16-40, in or near Buffalo, Wyoming and
- EDZ Irigary Bridge, County Road CN16-254, in or near Sussex, Wyoming.

== See also ==
- List of bridges documented by the Historic American Engineering Record in Wyoming
