= Willow Creek Bridge =

- U.S. National Register of Historic Places
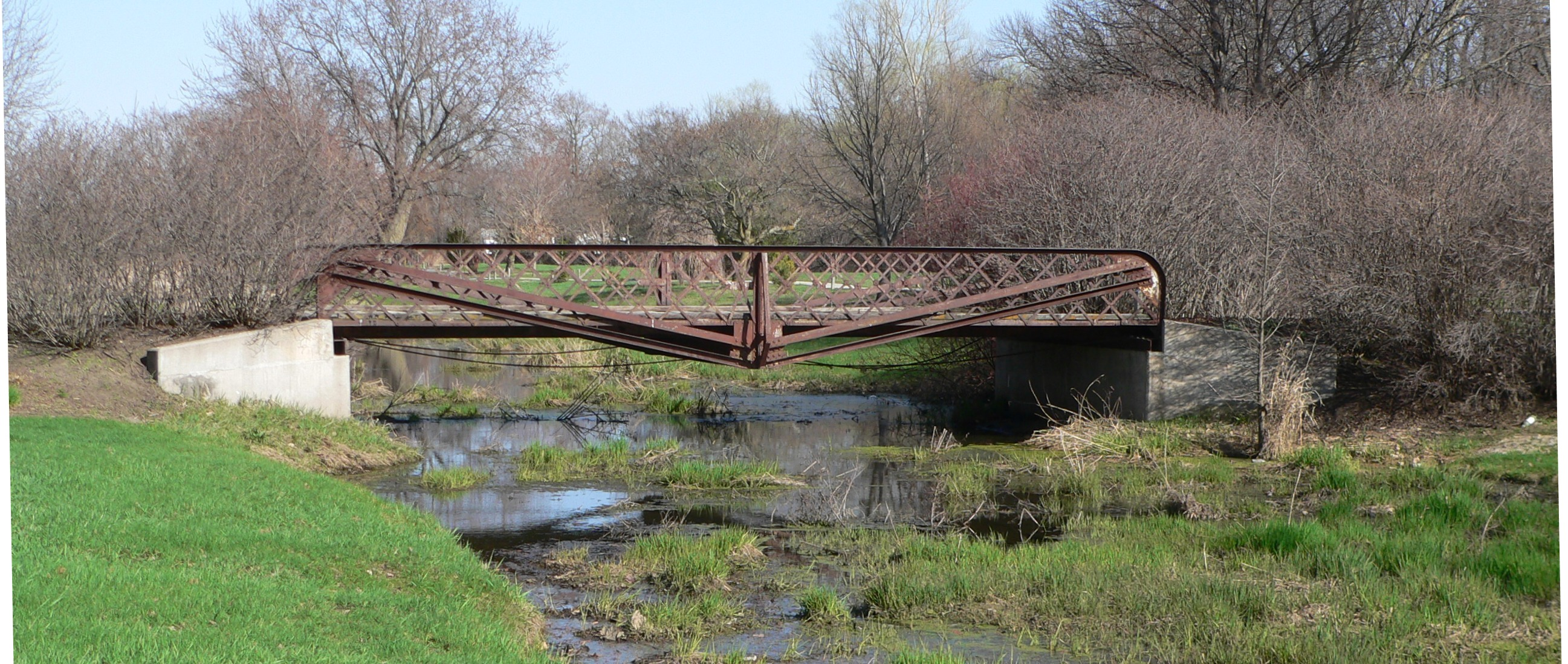

- Location within Nebraska Location within the United States
- Nearest city: Foster, Nebraska
- Coordinates: 42.2005745°N 97.5204158°W
- Area: less than one acre
- Built: 1913
- Built by: Canton Bridge Co.; Cambria Steel Co.
- Architectural style: Lattice pony truss
- MPS: Highway Bridges in Nebraska MPS
- NRHP reference No.: 92000706
- Added to NRHP: June 29, 1992

The Willow Creek Bridge, which brought a Pierce County, Nebraska road over Willow Creek, about 6.5 miles (10.5 km) miles south of Foster, Nebraska, was built in 1913. It is a Lattice truss bridge. It was listed on the National Register of Historic Places in 1992. The bridge was moved to Gilman Park in Pierce, Nebraska in 1994.

The bridge has a single 34.0 feet (10.4 m) span and supports a 15.7 feet (4.8 m) roadway. Its floor is a timber deck over I-beam stringers and it is of steel, rigid-connected lattice pony truss construction with latticed guardrails.

Although probably a number of similar structures were built on secondary roads in Nebraska in the early 1900s, only this and another also built by Canton Bridge Company, and also crossing Willow Creek in Pierce County, were surviving in 1992. Its NRHP nomination summarized: "In a well-preserved state, this bridge is technologically significant as one of the last remaining examples in the state of this early vehicular truss type."
