= Chapman Creek Pratt Truss Bridge =

- U.S. National Register of Historic Places
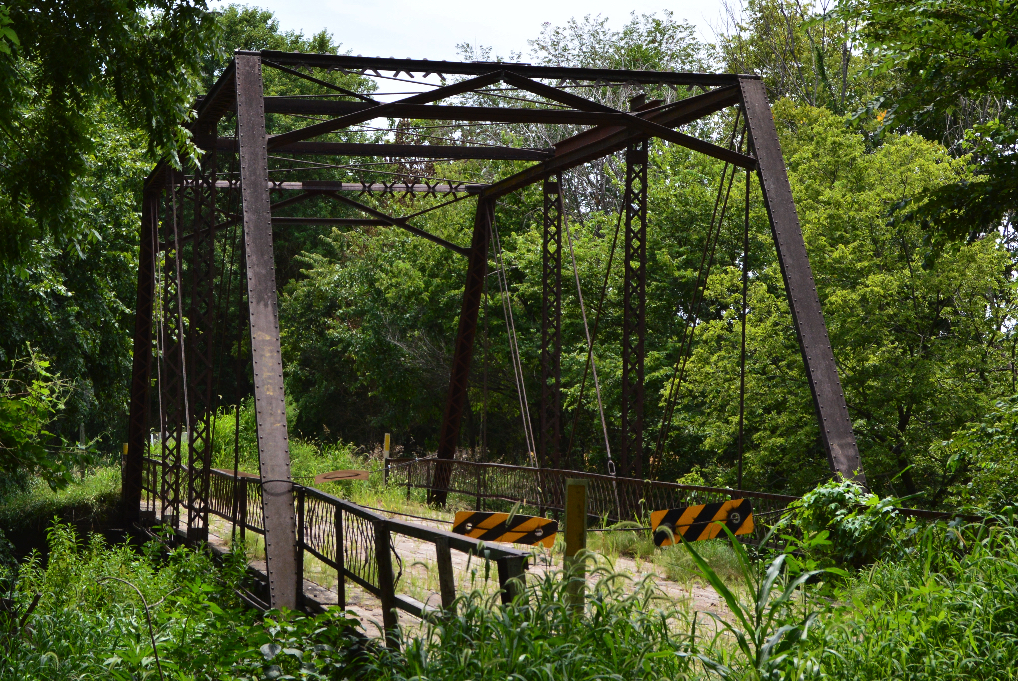

- Location within Kansas Location within the United States
- Nearest city: Chapman, Kansas
- Coordinates: 39°0′31″N 97°2′12″W
- Area: less than one acre
- Built: 1905
- Architect: Canton Bridge Co.
- Architectural style: Pratt Truss
- MPS: Metal Truss Bridges in Kansas 1861--1939 MPS
- NRHP reference No.: 03000375
- Added to NRHP: May 9, 2003

The Chapman Creek Pratt Truss Bridge is a Pratt truss bridge located near Chapman, Kansas. The bridge spans Chapman Creek, a branch of the Smoky Hill River, and carries a dirt road called Quail Road. It was built in 1905 by the Canton Bridge Company. The bridge was one of 800 Pratt truss bridges in Kansas as of 1998 and is considered "an excellent example" of one of the most common bridge types in the state.

The bridge was listed on the National Register of Historic Places in 2003. According to its National Register nomination, it is also known as 21-HT-02 or as 08583.00436.6.

The National Bridge Inventory has classified the bridge as "structurally deficient".

== See also ==
- Wilson Pratt Truss Bridge, another Canton Bridge Co. bridge near Chapman, also NRHP-listed
