= Ranney Bridge =

- U.S. National Register of Historic Places
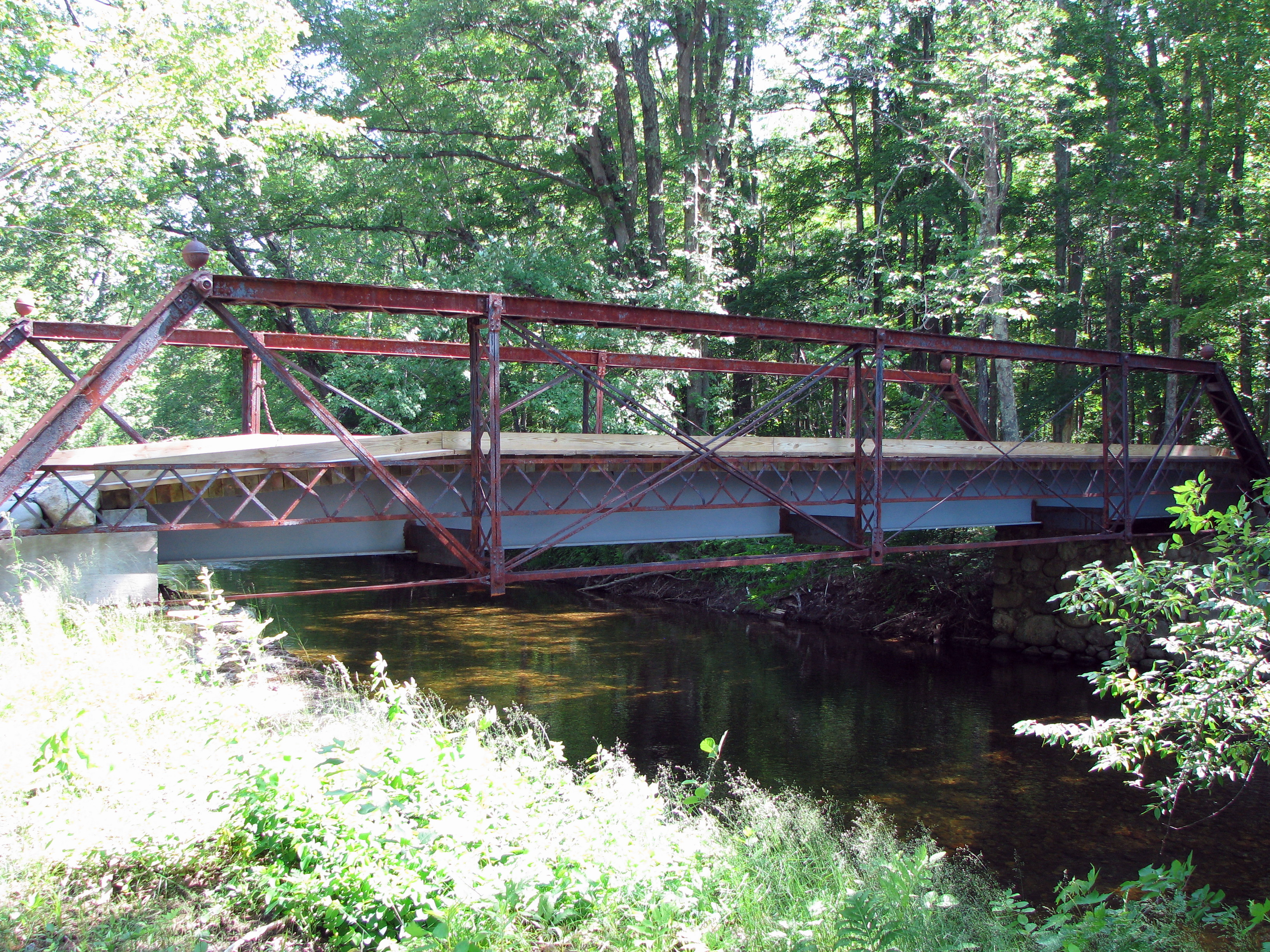
- Ranney Bridge, June 2010

- Location within New York Location within the United States
- Location: Private Road off NY 73 over East Branch of AuSable River, Keene Valley, New York
- Coordinates: 44°10′55″N 73°47′3″W
- Area: less than one acre
- Built: 1902
- Architect: Canton Iron Bridge Company
- Architectural style: Pratt Pony Truss Bridge
- MPS: AuSable River Valley Bridges MPS
- NRHP reference No.: 99001329
- Added to NRHP: November 12, 1999

Ranney Bridge is a historic Pratt Pony Truss Bridge over the Ausable River at Keene Valley in Essex County, New York. It was built in 1902 and was built by the Canton Iron Bridge Company. It was originally located at the hamlet of New Russia and moved to its present site about 1925. It is 15 feet, 9 inches wide and spans 59 feet, 9 inches at roughly 7 feet, 4 inches above water level.

It was listed on the National Register of Historic Places in 1999.
