= Wilson Pratt Truss Bridge =

- U.S. National Register of Historic Places
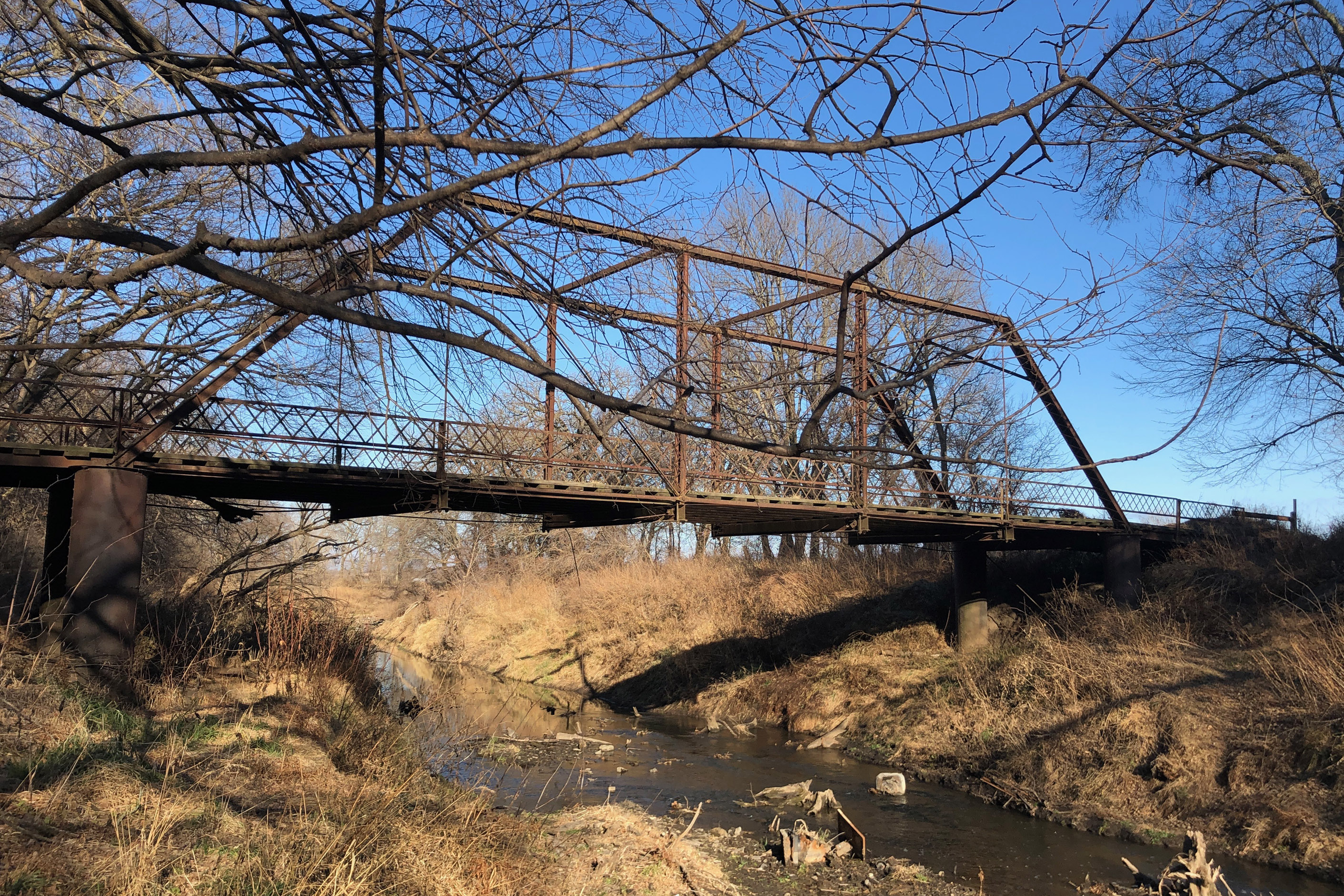

- Location within Kansas Location within the United States
- Nearest city: Chapman, Kansas
- Coordinates: 39.060463°N 97.072891°W
- Area: less than one acre
- Built: 1904
- Architect: Canton Bridge Co.
- Architectural style: Pratt Truss
- MPS: Metal Truss Bridges in Kansas 1861--1939 MPS
- NRHP reference No.: 08001349
- Added to NRHP: January 22, 2009

The Wilson Pratt Truss Bridge is a Pratt Truss bridge over the Chapman Creek near Chapman, Kansas that was built in 1904. It was listed on the National Register of Historic Places in 2009. It was built by the Canton Bridge Co. and is an excellent example of this type of bridge, along with the nearby Chapman Creek Pratt Truss Bridge. The bridge spanning the creek is 90 feet (27 m) long. It has a wooden deck. There are two additional approach spans on either side of the bridge for a total length of 165 feet (50 m). Due to its location on a dirt road, it has been mostly left alone and does not carry much traffic. It is also denoted as 21-HT-1 and as KSHS Inventory # 041-0000-0169.
