= Swan Creek Bridge =

- Formerly listed on the U.S. National Register of Historic Places
- Location within Missouri Location within the United States
- Nearest city: Forsyth, Missouri
- Coordinates: 36°42′2″N 93°5′8″W
- Area: less than one acre
- Built: 1914, 1932
- Built by: Canton Bridge Company
- NRHP reference No.: 83001055

Significant dates
- Added to NRHP: September 8, 1983
- Removed from NRHP: December 19, 1994

Swan Creek Bridge was a historic Pratt truss bridge located at Forsyth, Taney County, Missouri. It was built in 1914 by the Canton Bridge Company as one span of a double span highway bridge. The span was moved to a location at Swan Creek in 1932. It was destroyed in 1989.

It was listed on the National Register of Historic Places in 1983 and delisted in 1994.
