= Rolling Mill Mine =

Mine in operation in Johnstown, Cambria County, Pennsylvania

Coordinates: 40.330°N 78.927°W

The Rolling Mill Mine was a drift portal coal mine in operation in Johnstown, Cambria County, Pennsylvania, operating from approximately 1856 until 1931. It was originally owned by the Cambria Iron Company and was developed in the Westmont hillside across the Conemaugh River from the company's rolling mill. Its portal was near the confluence of the Stonycreek River and Little Conemaugh River. It supplied the bulk of the coal used in the iron and steel making taking place in the city, producing an average of 3,000 tons a day in 1902, and primarily employed recent immigrants from Central and Eastern Europe.

== Explosion ==
On Thursday, July 10, 1902, at approximately 11:00 a.m., a powerful explosion occurred in the Klondike section of the mine, and ultimately 112 miners, 84 of whom were immigrants from England, Poland and Slovakia, lost their lives. The explosion was attributed to what miners refer to as firedamp, a methane gas mixture. Killed immediately were those miners working in the Klondike section. Many other miners, as well as the vast majority of mine animals, were killed by an asphyxiating gas called afterdamp that spread through the mine as they fled to the Millcreek Portal, several miles away, the only other exit from the mine. In fact, only seven of the deaths in the disaster were caused by the explosion; the rest were caused by afterdamp. The mine was re-opened on Monday, July 14, but the disaster devastated the immigrant community in Johnstown and provoked calls for investigations and greater safety measures from public officials and even foreign governments. The Rolling Mill Mine Disaster still ranks as one of the most deadly mining accidents in the history of the United States.

== Closure ==
The mine continued in operation until 1931, when the portals were sealed after it was worked out. At the end it was known as Mine #71 of the Bethlehem Mines Corporation, which in more recent times was known as BethEnergy.

== Entrance ==
One of the original entrances to the Rolling Mill Mine can still be seen on the James Wolfe Sculpture Trail, which runs down Yoder (Westmont) Hill near the incline and directly across from the Point Stadium. Coal was transported to the nearby Iron Works through this portal on a company-built trestle.
