= Big Blue River Bridge (Surprise, Nebraska) =

- U.S. National Register of Historic Places
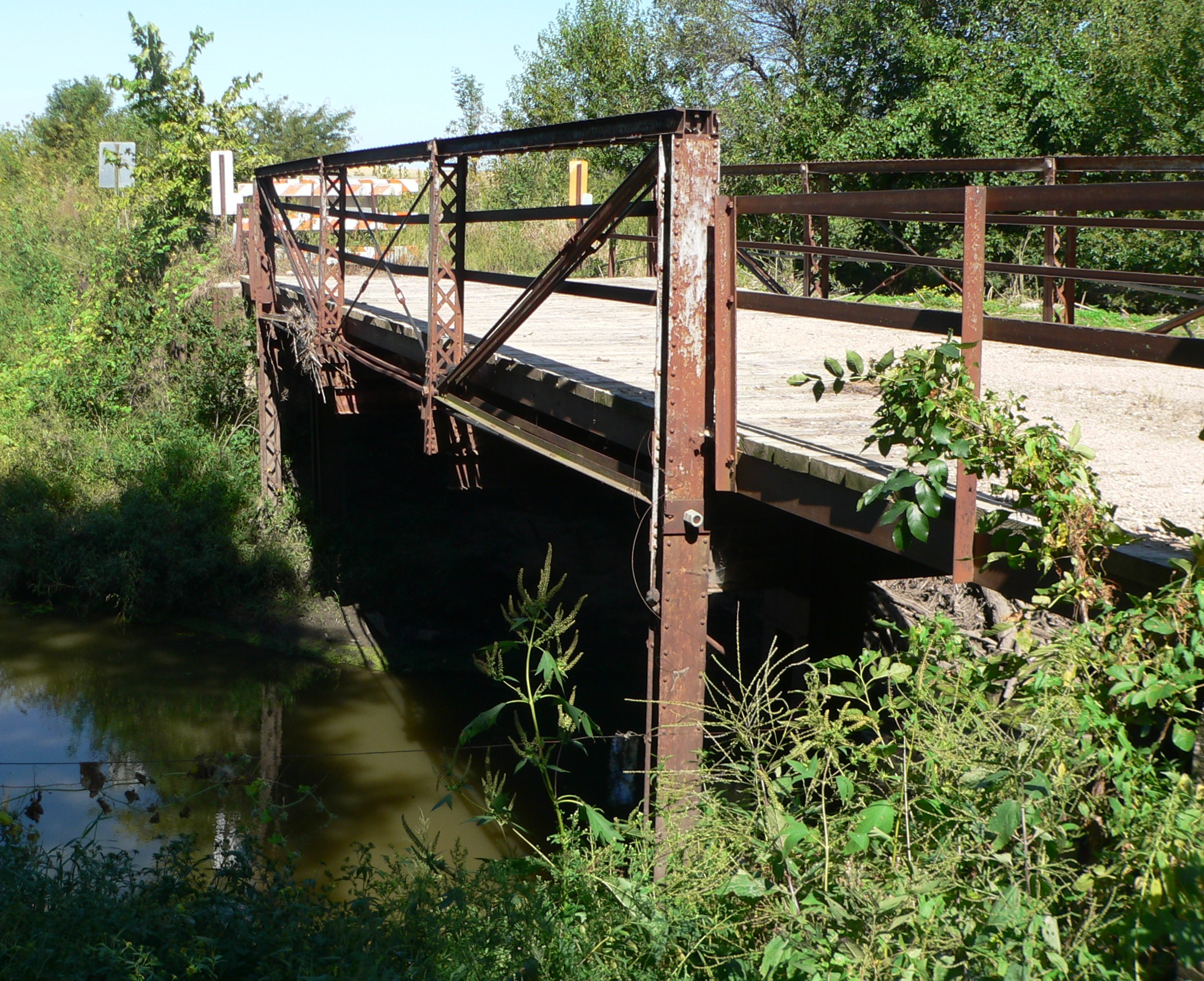

- Location within Nebraska Location within the United States
- Location: Township road over the Big Blue River, 1 mile southeast of Surprise
- Nearest city: Surprise, Nebraska
- Coordinates: 41°6′3″N 97°17′28″W
- Area: less than one acre
- Built: 1897
- Built by: Canton Bridge Co.; Jones & Laughlin Steel Co.
- Architectural style: Pin-connected Pratt truss
- MPS: Highway Bridges in Nebraska MPS
- NRHP reference No.: 92000708
- Added to NRHP: June 29, 1992

The Big Blue River Bridge near Surprise, Nebraska is a pin-connected Pratt truss bridge that was built in 1897. It was designed and built by the Canton Bridge Co. with steel fabricated by the Jones & Laughlin Steel Co. Also denoted NEHBS No. BU00-84, it was listed on the National Register of Historic Places in 1992. It was deemed significant as a relatively rare example, and one of the oldest examples documented in Nebraska, of a truss leg bedstead bridge.

As of 2010, the bridge was closed to traffic. The Bridge is no longer closed.
