= Pleasant Ridge Church =

Historic church in Kansas, United States

- U.S. National Register of Historic Places
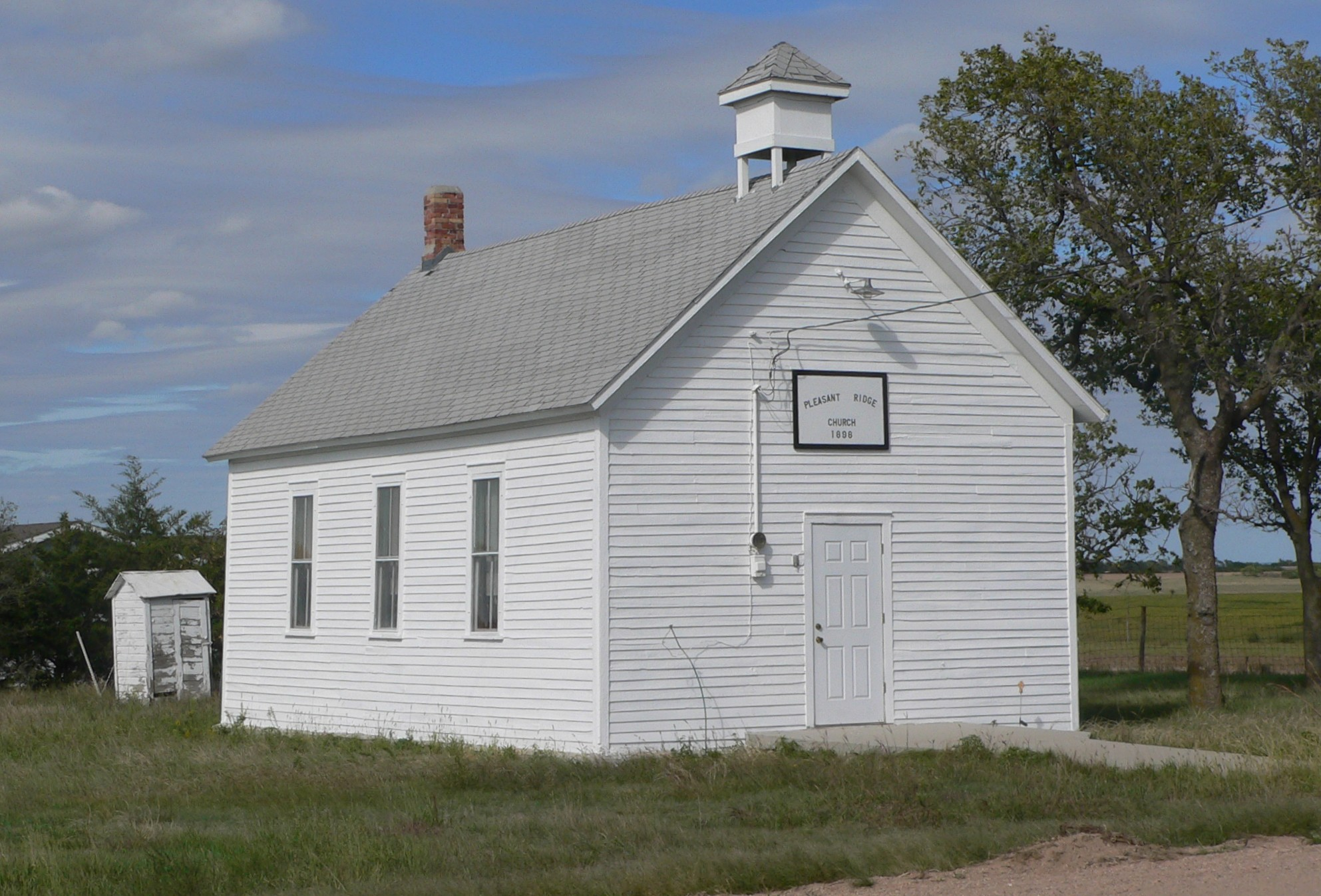

- Location within Kansas Location within the United States
- Nearest city: Phillipsburg, Kansas
- Coordinates: 39°59′14.75″N 99°15′26.75″W
- Built: 1898
- NRHP reference No.: 05001204
- Added to NRHP: November 5, 2005

The Pleasant Ridge Church in Phillipsburg, Kansas, known also as Sod Church is a church which was built in 1898. It was added to the National Register of Historic Places in 2005.

It is a 20 by 32 feet (6.1 m × 9.8 m) building, built in a national folk architectural style. It replaced a sod church across the road.

Regular church services ended in 1969. In 1989 the property was sold to the Pleasant Ridge Historical Society, Inc.
