= Hoff School District No. 42 =

- U.S. National Register of Historic Places
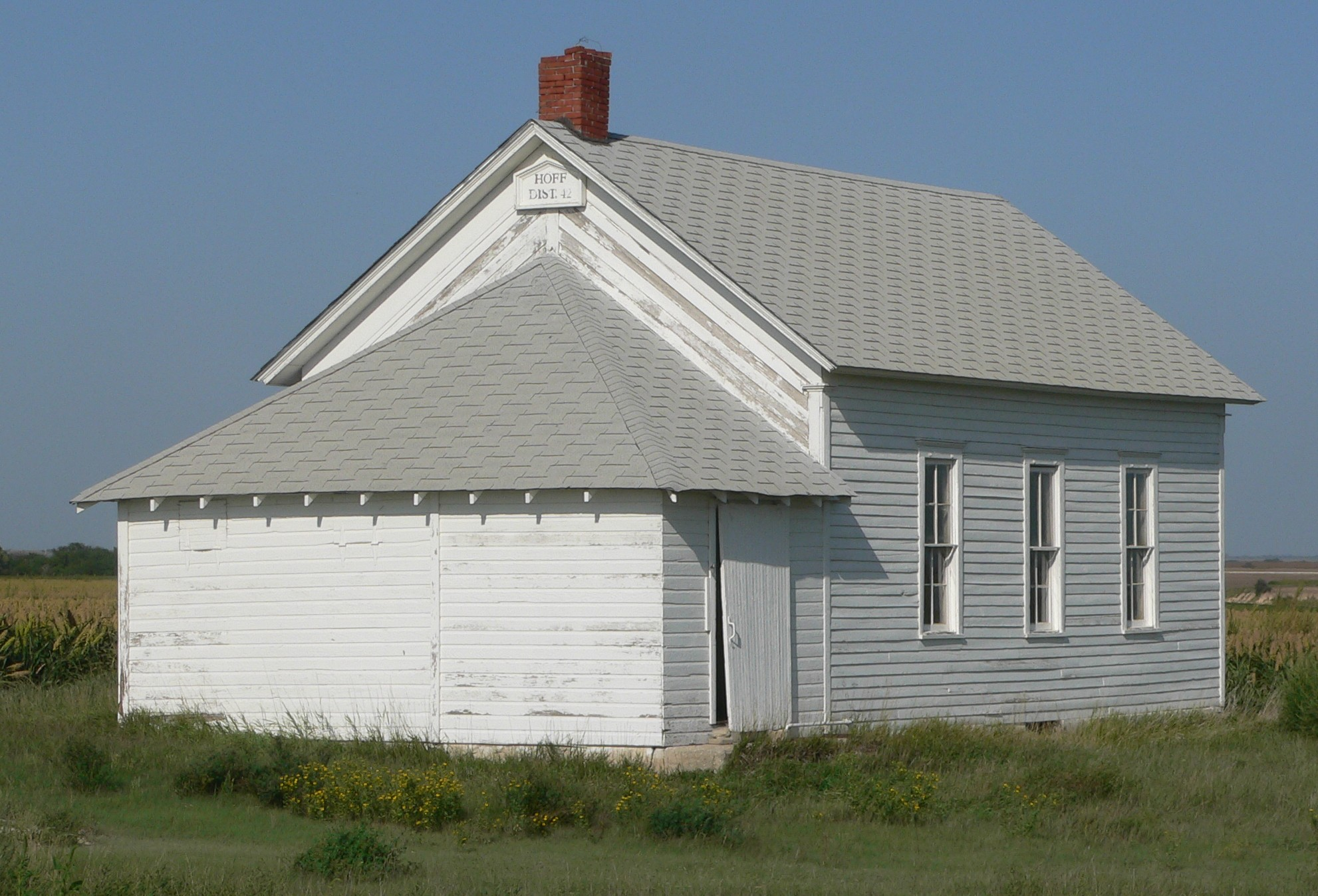

- Location within Kansas
- Location: Near intersection of E. Union Rd. and E. 1300 Rd., Kirwin, Kansas
- Coordinates: 39.71377°N 99.08461°W
- Area: 1.2 acres (0.49 ha)
- Built: 1899
- Built by: Agard, Fred M.
- Architectural style: Late Victorian
- MPS: Public Schools of Kansas MPS
- NRHP reference No.: 10001140
- Added to NRHP: January 18, 2011

The Hoff School District No. 42, near Kirwin, Kansas in Phillips County, Kansas, is a one-room schoolhouse built in 1899. It was listed on the National Register of Historic Places in 2011.

It is a wood-frame structure that was built to serve what was then rural Kirwin Township, one of 25 townships within the county, at approximately the peak of population in the county (14,442 in 1900; 4,981 in 2020).

It was built by carpenter Fred M. Agard with assistance of a Mr. Freeman. "Like many one-room schools, it features a front-entry addition and a front-facing gable roof with three double-hung windows on each of the north and south sides."

It is located near the intersection of E. Union Rd. and E. 1300 Rd., which is 4.8 miles (7.7 km) by road from what is now the small city of Kirwin, Kansas, and 15.7 miles (25.3 km) from Phillipsburg, the county seat.

Its listing is consistent with historic integrity standards for one-room schoolhouses in Kansas that were established in a 2005 study.
