= Bell Bridge =

- U.S. National Register of Historic Places
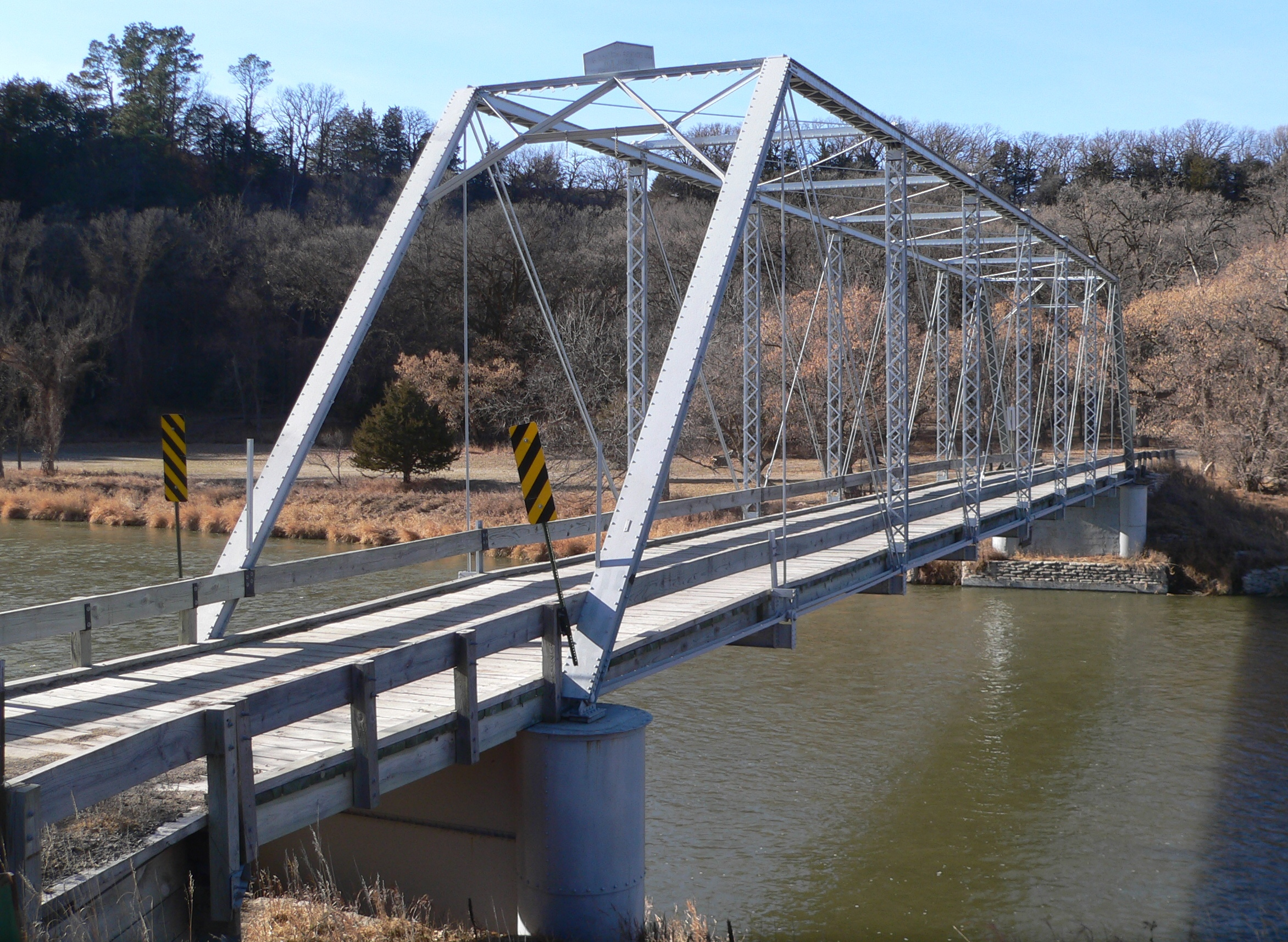

- Location within Nebraska Location within the United States
- Nearest city: Valentine, Nebraska
- Coordinates: 42°53′42″N 100°19′20″W
- Area: less than one acre
- Built: 1903
- Built by: Canton Bridge Co.; Cambria Steel Co.
- Architectural style: Pratt through truss
- MPS: Highway Bridges in Nebraska MPS
- NRHP reference No.: 92000752
- Added to NRHP: June 29, 1992

The Bell Bridge, crossing the Niobrara River near Valentine, Nebraska, is a historic bridge that is listed on the National Register of Historic Places.

It is a Pratt through truss bridge that was designed by the Canton Bridge Co. of Canton, Ohio, fabricated by the Cambria Steel Co. of Johnstown, Pennsylvania, and built by the Canton Bridge Co. It was built in 1903 and brings a Cherry County road across the Niobrara, 11.9 miles northeast of Valentine. It has also been known as the Allen Bridge and the Niobrara River Bridge and is registered as NEHBS No. CE00-22.

It is one of just four bridges in Cherry County that survived a flood in February, 1916. According to its NRHP nomination it is notable as "one of the oldest, longest and best-preserved of Cherry County's remarkable group of through trusses" and is "distinguished as one of the handful of pre-1916 trusses remaining" in the county and in the state.

National Register designation was given in 1992.
