= Adamson Bridge =

- Formerly listed on the U.S. National Register of Historic Places
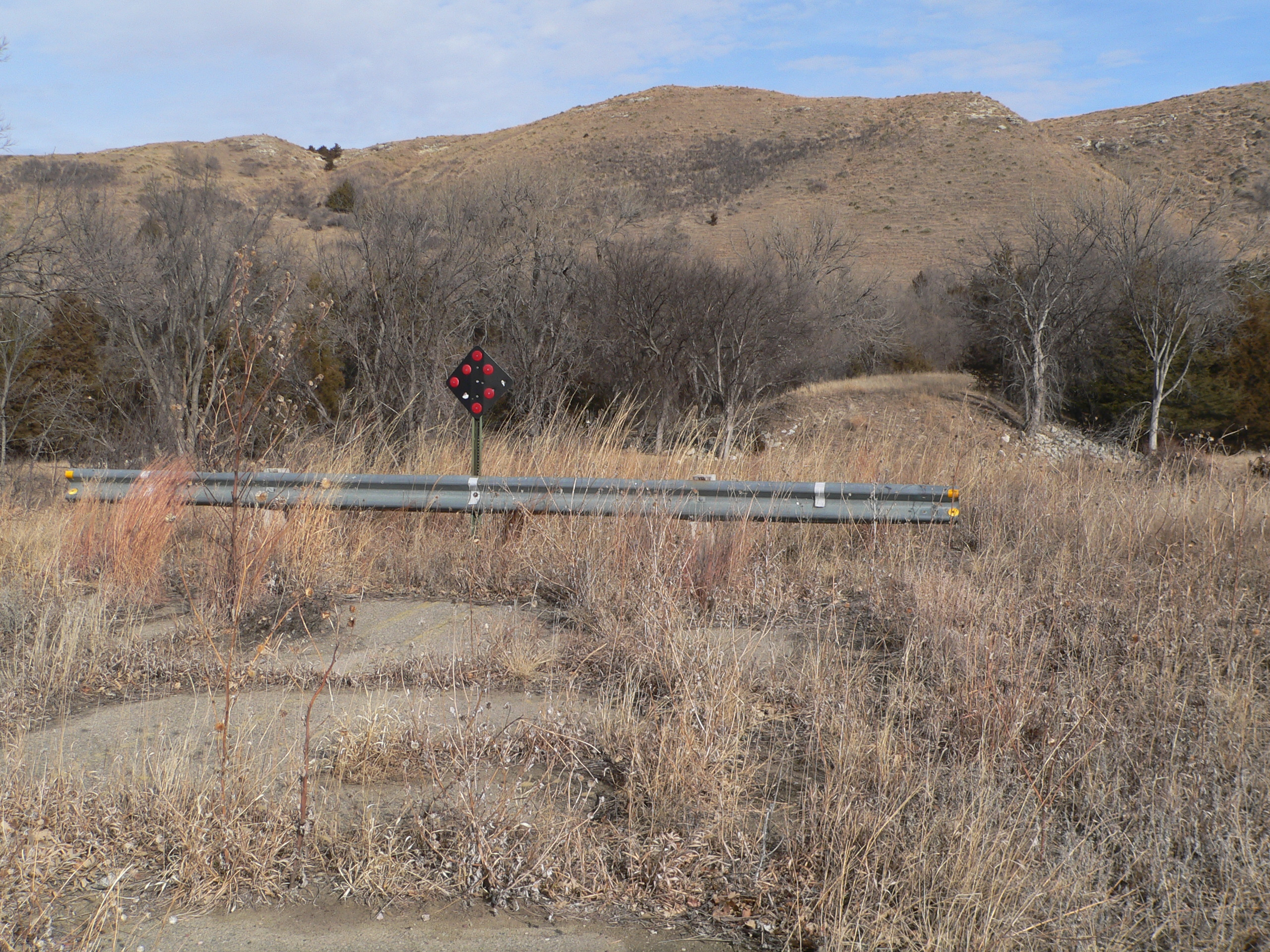
- Former bridge site, photographed from south bank in 2014

- Location within Nebraska Location within the United States
- Nearest city: Valentine, Nebraska
- Coordinates: 42°48′26″N 100°40′20″W
- Area: less than one acre
- Built: 1916
- Architect: Canton Bridge Co.
- Architectural style: Timber stringer trestle
- MPS: Highway Bridges in Nebraska MPS
- NRHP reference No.: 92000749

Significant dates
- Added to NRHP: June 29, 1992
- Removed from NRHP: March 25, 2019

The Adamson Bridge near Valentine in Cherry County, Nebraska, is or was a historic bridge. It was listed on the U.S. National Register of Historic Places in 1992, and was delisted in 2019.

The bridge was built in 1916 by the Canton Bridge Co. It was a timber stringer trestle bridge. It has also been known as the Niobrara River Bridge and has been denoted as NEHBS No. CE00-227.

When it was listed on the National Register, the bridge was notable as one of few surviving examples in Nebraska of early timber bridge designs. The Adamson Bridge appeared to have survived with few alterations due to relatively light traffic at its location.

The bridge was listed on the National Register of Historic Places in 1992.

The river crossing was apparently replaced by a concrete beam bridge crossing, at a different crossing point, ca. 1994. Aerial photo view of the coordinates given in the NRHP nomination suggest the highway alignment has changed, showing roads leading to a former crossing point but with no bridge remaining.
