= EDL Peloux Bridge =

- U.S. National Register of Historic Places
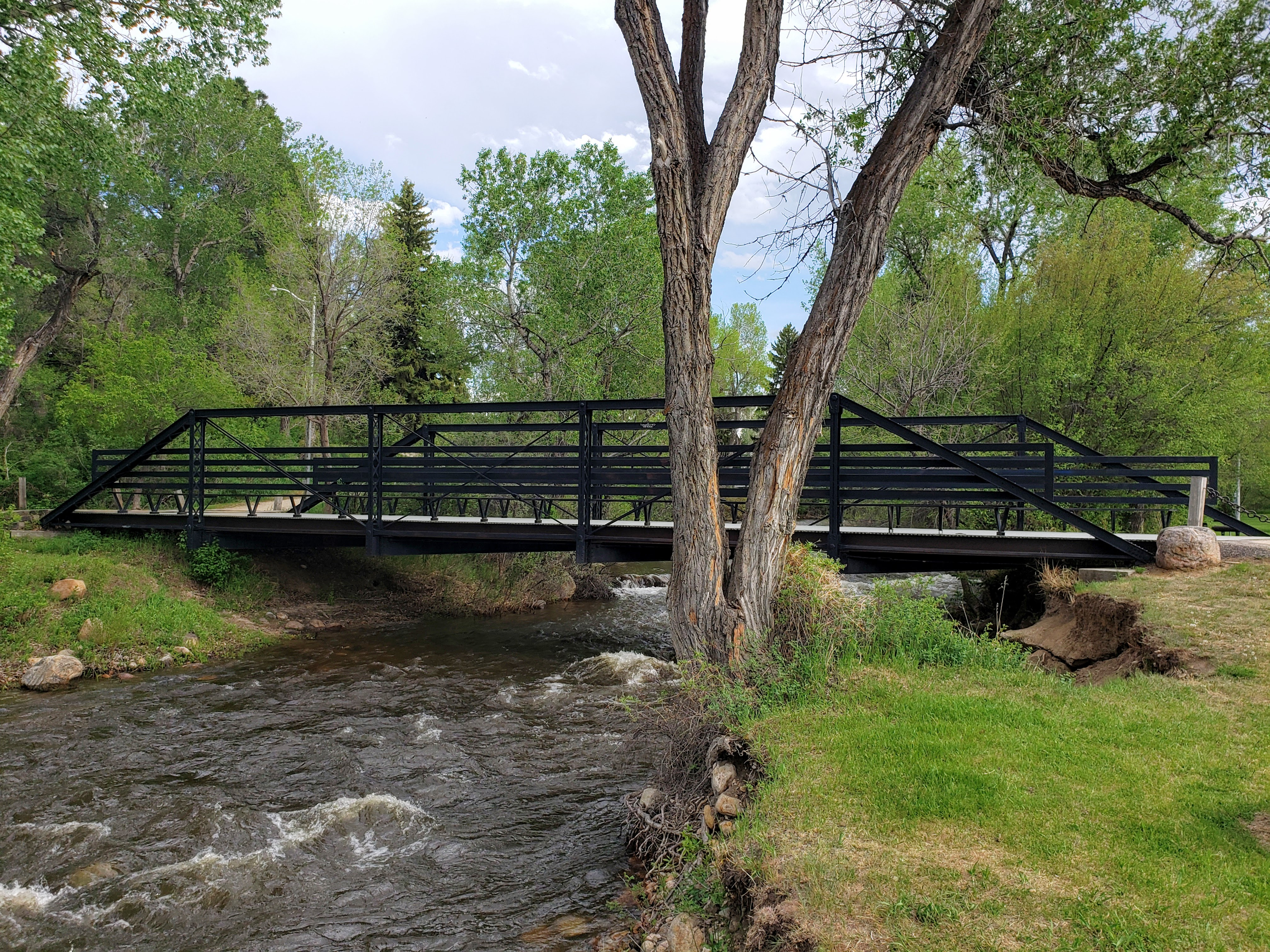

- Location within Wyoming Location within the United States
- Nearest city: Buffalo, Wyoming
- Coordinates: 44°20′41.7″N 106°42′15.8″W
- Area: less than one acre
- Built: 1912
- Built by: Canton Bridge Company
- Architectural style: Pratt pony truss
- MPS: Vehicular Truss and Arch Bridges in Wyoming TR
- NRHP reference No.: 85000425
- Added to NRHP: February 22, 1985

The EDL Peloux Bridge near Buffalo, Wyoming, is a Pratt pony truss bridge that was built in 1912 by the Canton Bridge Company. The bridge carries Johnson County Road CN16-40 across Clear Creek. The single-span bridge is 81.5 feet (24.8 m) long and has a wooden roadway supported by steel pins and piles. The bridge was placed on the National Register of Historic Places in 1985 as part of a Multiple Property Submission devoted to historic bridges in Wyoming The bridge was relocated to Buffalo City Park in 1986.

== See also ==
- List of bridges documented by the Historic American Engineering Record in Wyoming
