= Borman Bridge =

- U.S. National Register of Historic Places
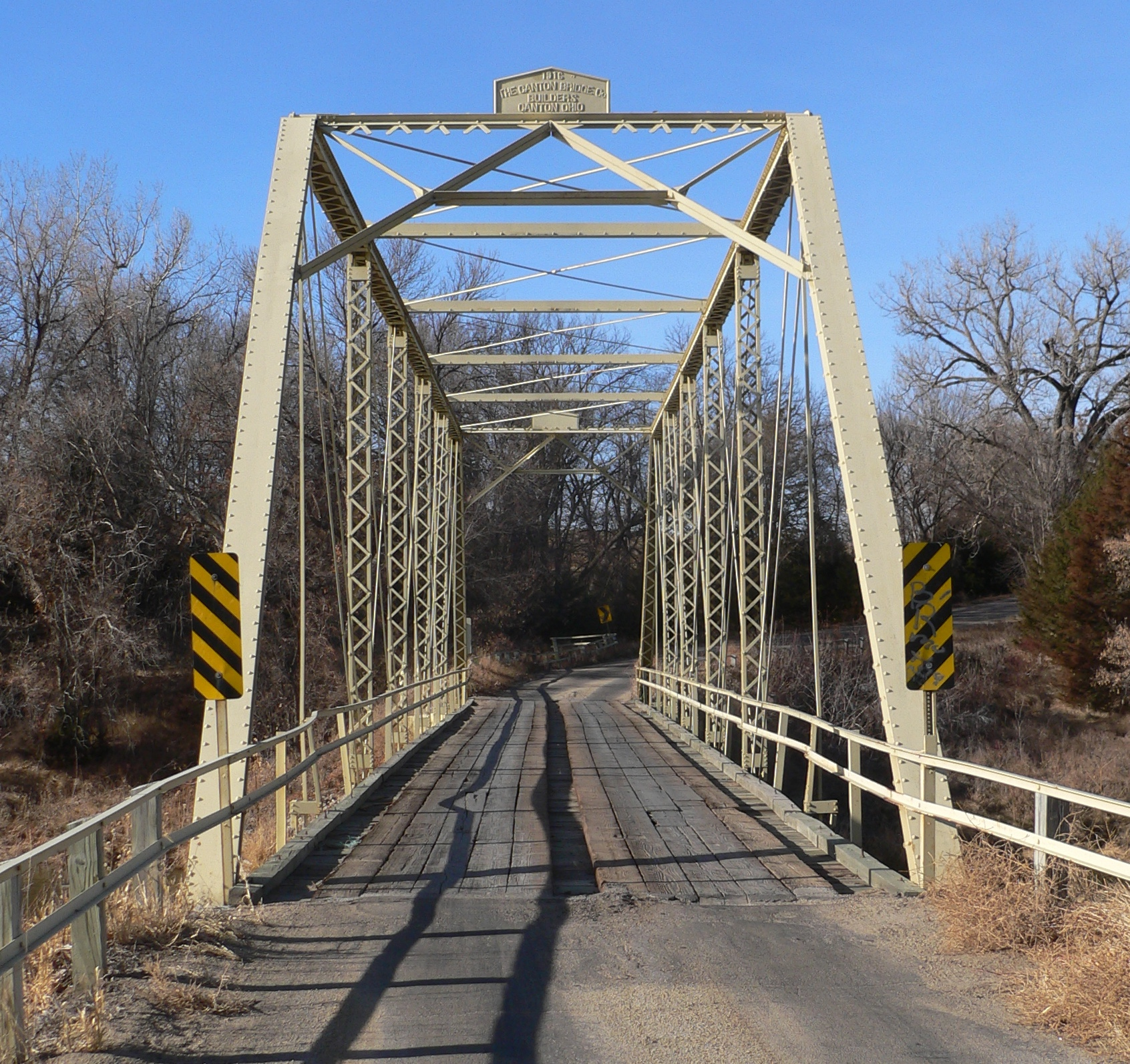

- Location within Nebraska Location within the United States
- Location: County road over the Niobrara River, 2.3 miles southeast of Valentine
- Nearest city: Valentine, Nebraska
- Coordinates: 42°51′7″N 100°31′15″W
- Area: less than one acre
- Built: 1916
- Built by: Canton Bridge Co.; Cambria Steel Co.
- Architectural style: Pratt through truss
- MPS: Highway Bridges in Nebraska MPS
- NRHP reference No.: 92000751
- Added to NRHP: June 29, 1992

The Borman Bridge bringing a Cherry County, Nebraska road over the Niobrara River near Valentine, Nebraska was built in 1916, as a replacement for one of 18 Cherry County bridges washed away by flood and winter ice on February 16, 1916. It was designed by the Canton Bridge Co. of Canton, Ohio, fabricated by the Cambria Steel Co. of Johnstown, and built by the Canton Bridge Co.

It has also been known as the Niobrara River Bridge and known as NEHBS No. CE00-224. It is a pinned Pratt through truss bridge that could be and was built quickly, and has since carried only light traffic. It cost $4,230.

It was listed on the National Register of Historic Places in 1992.
