= Eldorado Bridge =

- U.S. National Register of Historic Places
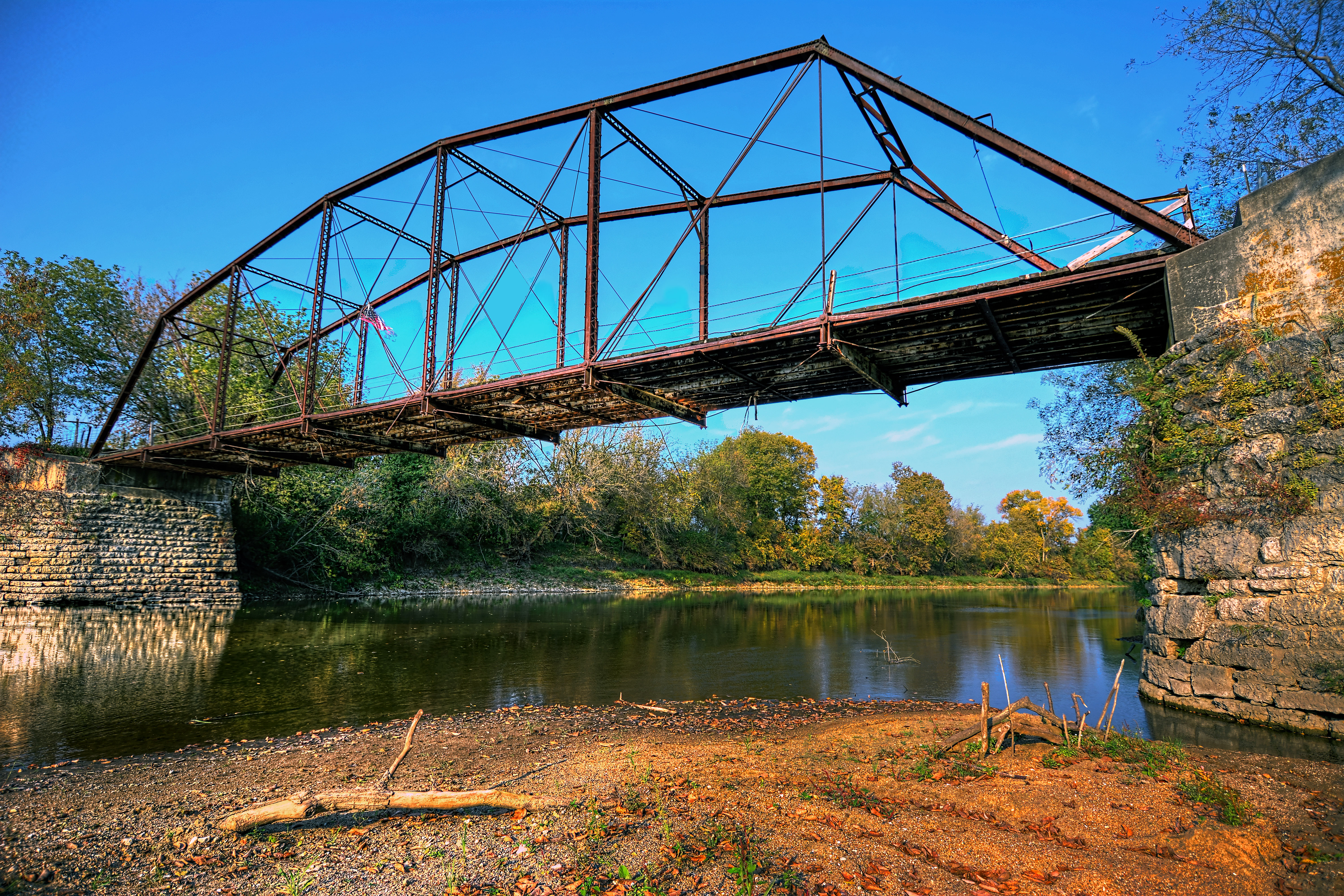

- Location within Iowa Location within the United States
- Location: State Street over the Turkey River, Eldorado, Iowa
- Coordinates: 43°03′14.7″N 91°50′04.9″W
- Built: 1898-1899
- Architect: J.G. Ratcliffe
- Architectural style: Camelback through truss
- MPS: Highway Bridges of Iowa MPS
- NRHP reference No.: 98000783
- Added to NRHP: June 25, 1998

The Eldorado Bridge is a historic structure located in the unincorporated community of Eldorado, Iowa, United States. It spans the Turkey River for 130 feet (40 m). The Fayette County Board of Supervisors contracted with J.G. Ratcliffe of Waukon, Iowa to design and build this Camelback through truss bridge. It features a single pin-connected span and stone abutments. It was complete in March 1899. The bridge was listed on the National Register of Historic Places in 1998.
