= Stouts Mills, West Virginia =

- Unincorporated community
- Location within West Virginia Location within the United States
- Coordinates: 38°53′42″N 80°43′49″W
- Country: United States
- State: West Virginia
- County: Gilmer
- Elevation: 738 ft (225 m)
- Time zone: UTC-5 (Eastern (EST))
  - Summer (DST): UTC-4 (EDT)
- Area codes: 304 & 681
- GNIS feature ID: 1555724

Stouts Mills is an unincorporated community in Gilmer County, West Virginia, United States. Stouts Mills is located on West Virginia Route 5, 1.5 miles (2.4 km) southeast of Sand Fork.

The community was named after one Mr. Stout, the proprietor of a local mill.
