= Lenora, Kansas =

City in Norton County, Kansas

- City
- Location within Norton County and Kansas

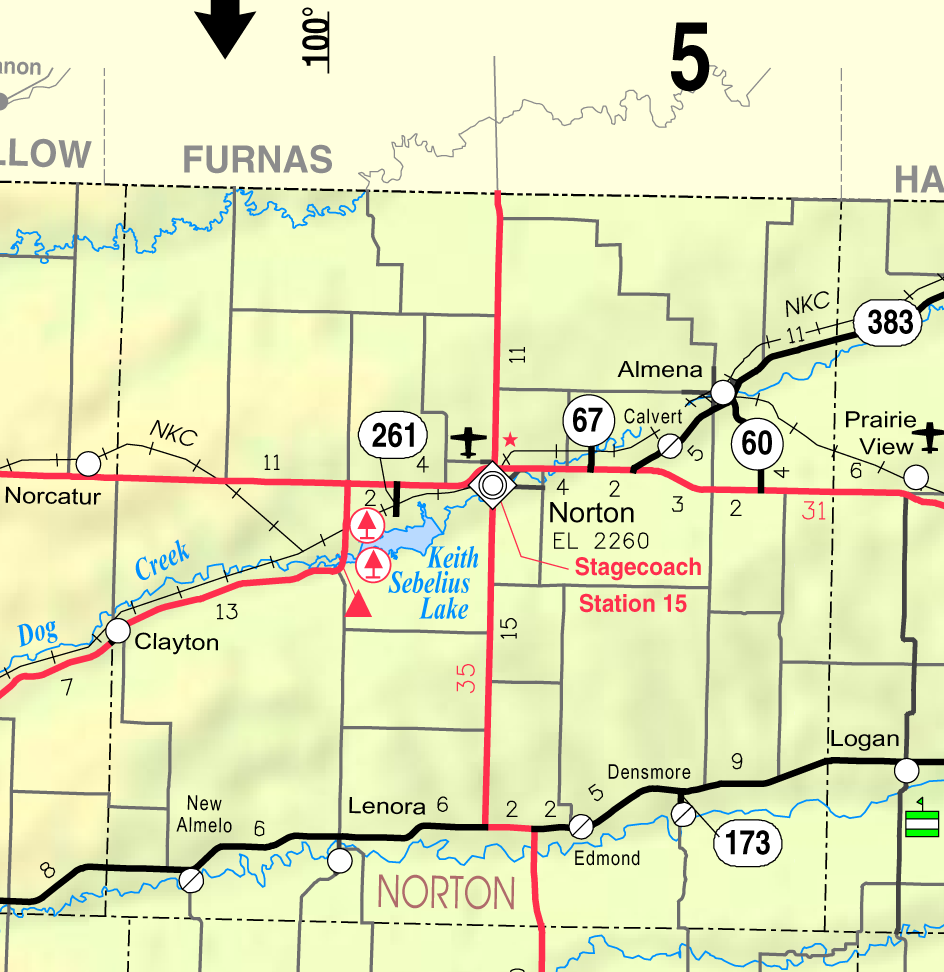
- KDOT map of Norton County (legend)
- Coordinates: 39°36′40″N 100°0′5″W
- Country: United States
- State: Kansas
- County: Norton
- Founded: 1873
- Incorporated: 1887
- Named for: Lenora Hauser

Area
  - Total: 0.48 sq mi (1.25 km^{2})
  - Land: 0.48 sq mi (1.25 km^{2})
  - Water: 0 sq mi (0.00 km^{2})
- Elevation: 2,267 ft (691 m)

Population (2020)
  - Total: 207
  - Density: 429/sq mi (166/km^{2})
- Time zone: UTC-6 (CST)
  - Summer (DST): UTC-5 (CDT)
- ZIP Code: 67645
- Area code: 785
- FIPS code: 20-39400
- GNIS ID: 471118

Lenora is a city in Norton County, Kansas, United States. As of the 2020 census, the population of the city was 207. It is located south of K-9 highway.

== History ==
Lenora was founded in 1873. It was named for Mrs. Lenora Hauser, a pioneer settler.

The first post office in Lenora was established in June 1874.

== Geography ==
Lenora is located at 39°36′40″N 100°0′5″W (39.610975, -100.001391). According to the United States Census Bureau, the city has a total area of 0.51 square miles (1.32 km^{2}), all land.

== Demographics ==
Historical population
Census	Pop.	Note	%±
1880	34		—
1890	231		579.4%
1900	247		6.9%
1910	454		83.8%
1920	520		14.5%
1930	519		−0.2%
1940	537		3.5%
1950	511		−4.8%
1960	512		0.2%
1970	439		−14.3%
1980	444		1.1%
1990	329		−25.9%
2000	306		−7.0%
2010	250		−18.3%
2020	207		−17.2%
U.S. Decennial Census

=== 2020 census ===
The 2020 United States census counted 207 people, 100 households, and 59 families in Lenora. The population density was 429.5 per square mile (165.8/km^{2}). There were 173 housing units at an average density of 358.9 per square mile (138.6/km^{2}). The racial makeup was 93.72% (194) white or European American (92.75% non-Hispanic white), 0.0% (0) black or African-American, 0.0% (0) Native American or Alaska Native, 0.0% (0) Asian, 0.0% (0) Pacific Islander or Native Hawaiian, 0.48% (1) from other races, and 5.8% (12) from two or more races. Hispanic or Latino of any race was 2.9% (6) of the population.

Of the 100 households, 24.0% had children under the age of 18; 43.0% were married couples living together; 23.0% had a female householder with no spouse or partner present. 39.0% of households consisted of individuals and 15.0% had someone living alone who was 65 years of age or older. The average household size was 2.2 and the average family size was 2.7. The percent of those with a bachelor's degree or higher was estimated to be 18.8% of the population.

19.3% of the population was under the age of 18, 3.4% from 18 to 24, 21.7% from 25 to 44, 26.1% from 45 to 64, and 29.5% who were 65 years of age or older. The median age was 53.8 years. For every 100 females, there were 89.9 males. For every 100 females ages 18 and older, there were 85.6 males.

The 2016–2020 5-year American Community Survey estimates show that the median household income was $36,250 (with a margin of error of +/- $4,459) and the median family income was $36,033 (+/- $7,925). Males had a median income of $26,667 (+/- $9,025) versus $30,500 (+/- $7,276) for females. The median income for those above 16 years old was $28,750 (+/- $5,071). Approximately, 24.7% of families and 30.1% of the population were below the poverty line, including 56.7% of those under the age of 18 and 10.1% of those ages 65 or over.

=== 2010 census ===
As of the census of 2010, there were 250 people, 126 households, and 69 families residing in the city. The population density was 490.2 inhabitants per square mile (189.3/km^{2}). There were 182 housing units at an average density of 356.9 per square mile (137.8/km^{2}). The racial makeup of the city was 98.0% White and 2.0% from two or more races. Hispanic or Latino of any race were 2.8% of the population.

There were 126 households, of which 18.3% had children under the age of 18 living with them, 48.4% were married couples living together, 4.0% had a female householder with no husband present, 2.4% had a male householder with no wife present, and 45.2% were non-families. 40.5% of all households were made up of individuals, and 16.6% had someone living alone who was 65 years of age or older. The average household size was 1.98 and the average family size was 2.59.

The median age in the city was 50.8 years. 16.8% of residents were under the age of 18; 3.6% were between the ages of 18 and 24; 20.8% were from 25 to 44; 30.8% were from 45 to 64; and 28% were 65 years of age or older. The gender makeup of the city was 52.8% male and 47.2% female.

== Education ==
The community is served by Norton USD 211 public school district.

Lenora schools were closed through school unification. The Lenora High School mascot was Lenora Wildcats.
