= Long Island, Kansas =

City in Phillips County, Kansas

- City
- Location within Phillips County and Kansas

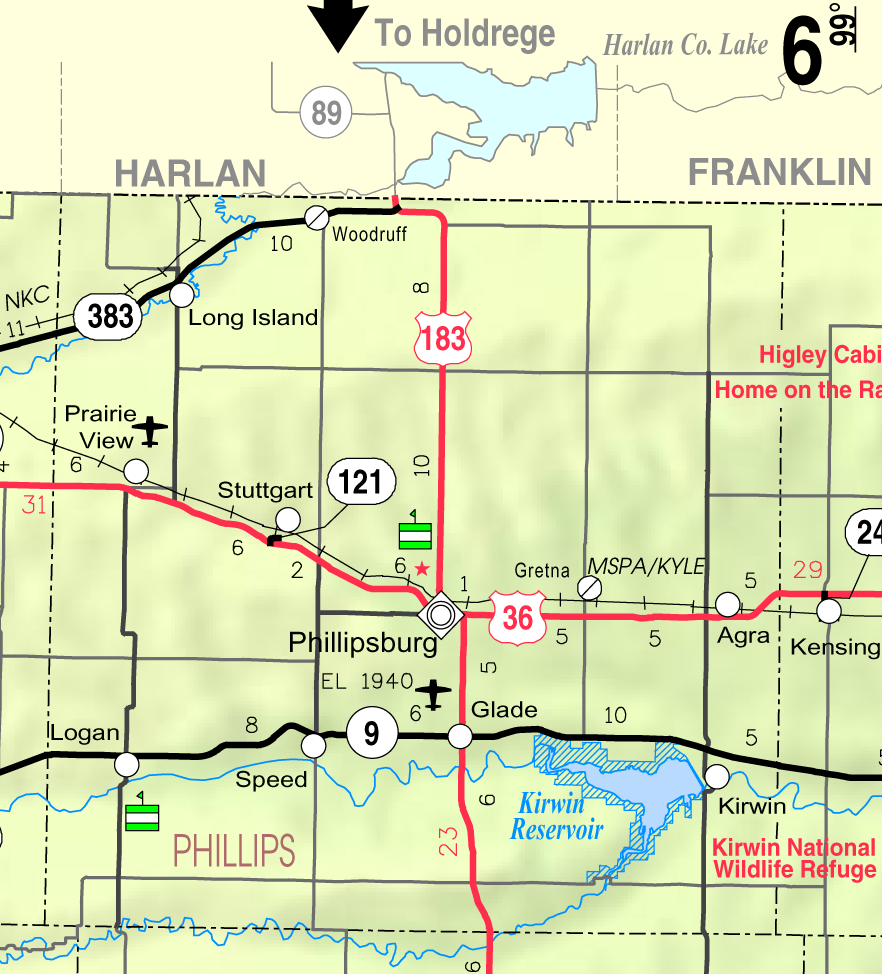
- KDOT map of Phillips County (legend)
- Coordinates: 39°56′46″N 99°32′02″W
- Country: United States
- State: Kansas
- County: Phillips
- Founded: 1870s
- Platted: 1873
- Incorporated: 1904

Area
  - Total: 0.41 sq mi (1.07 km^{2})
  - Land: 0.41 sq mi (1.07 km^{2})
  - Water: 0 sq mi (0.00 km^{2})
- Elevation: 2,070 ft (630 m)

Population (2020)
  - Total: 137
  - Density: 332/sq mi (128/km^{2})
- Time zone: UTC-6 (CST)
  - Summer (DST): UTC-5 (CDT)
- ZIP Code: 67647
- Area code: 785
- FIPS code: 20-42600
- GNIS ID: 2395755

Long Island is a city in Phillips County, Kansas, United States. As of the 2020 census, the population of the city was 137.

== History ==
The first post office was established at Long Island in May 1872. Long Island was laid out in 1873.

== Geography ==
According to the United States Census Bureau, the city has a total area of 0.44 square miles (1.14 km^{2}), all land.

== Demographics ==
Historical population
| Census | Pop. | Note | %± |
|---|---|---|---|
| 1910 | 291 | | — |
| 1920 | 286 | | −1.7% |
| 1930 | 242 | | −15.4% |
| 1940 | 257 | | 6.2% |
| 1950 | 247 | | −3.9% |
| 1960 | 229 | | −7.3% |
| 1970 | 195 | | −14.8% |
| 1980 | 187 | | −4.1% |
| 1990 | 170 | | −9.1% |
| 2000 | 155 | | −8.8% |
| 2010 | 134 | | −13.5% |
| 2020 | 137 | | 2.2% |
U.S. Decennial Census

=== 2020 census ===
The 2020 United States census counted 137 people, 52 households, and 34 families in Long Island. The population density was 333.3 per square mile (128.7/km^{2}). There were 67 housing units at an average density of 163.0 per square mile (62.9/km^{2}). The racial makeup was 94.16% (129) white or European American (94.16% non-Hispanic white), 0.73% (1) black or African-American, 0.0% (0) Native American or Alaska Native, 0.0% (0) Asian, 0.0% (0) Pacific Islander or Native Hawaiian, 0.0% (0) from other races, and 5.11% (7) from two or more races. Hispanic or Latino of any race was 4.38% (6) of the population.

Of the 52 households, 25.0% had children under the age of 18; 57.7% were married couples living together; 13.5% had a female householder with no spouse or partner present. 28.8% of households consisted of individuals and 9.6% had someone living alone who was 65 years of age or older. The average household size was 2.8 and the average family size was 3.1. The percent of those with a bachelor's degree or higher was estimated to be 13.1% of the population.

21.9% of the population was under the age of 18, 9.5% from 18 to 24, 28.5% from 25 to 44, 21.9% from 45 to 64, and 18.2% who were 65 years of age or older. The median age was 38.8 years. For every 100 females, there were 104.5 males. For every 100 females ages 18 and older, there were 98.1 males.

The 2016–2020 5-year American Community Survey estimates show that the median household income was $46,250 (with a margin of error of +/- $25,325) and the median family income was $65,000 (+/- $18,799). Males had a median income of $42,250 (+/- $9,621) versus $21,667 (+/- $16,737) for females. The median income for those above 16 years old was $28,750 (+/- $4,619). Approximately, 0.0% of families and 4.3% of the population were below the poverty line, including 0.0% of those under the age of 18 and 0.0% of those ages 65 or over.

=== 2010 census ===
As of the census of 2010, there were 134 people, 60 households, and 38 families residing in the city. The population density was 304.5 inhabitants per square mile (117.6/km^{2}). There were 77 housing units at an average density of 175.0 per square mile (67.6/km^{2}). The racial makeup of the city was 96.3% White and 3.7% from other races. Hispanic or Latino of any race were 3.7% of the population.

There were 60 households, of which 20.0% had children under the age of 18 living with them, 55.0% were married couples living together, 8.3% had a male householder with no wife present, and 36.7% were non-families. 35.0% of all households were made up of individuals, and 15% had someone living alone who was 65 years of age or older. The average household size was 2.23 and the average family size was 2.89.

The median age in the city was 49.3 years. 20.9% of residents were under the age of 18; 7.5% were between the ages of 18 and 24; 14.9% were from 25 to 44; 35.1% were from 45 to 64; and 21.6% were 65 years of age or older. The gender makeup of the city was 54.5% male and 45.5% female.

== Education ==
Long Island is served by Northern Valley USD 212 public school district. The Northern Valley High School mascot is Huskies.

Grades K-4 and 9-12 are located in the Almena school building, and grades 5-8 are in the Long Island school building.

The Northern Valley Huskies have won the following KSHSAA State Championships:

- 8-Man DI Football - 1986, 1990
- 8-Man DII Football - 1987
- 1A Boys Basketball - 1986, 1990, 1991
- 1A DII Boys Basketball - 2018
- 1A Boys Track & Field - 1986, 1987, 2019
- 1A Volleyball - 1993, 2017
- 1A Girls Basketball - 1994
- 1A Cheer Showcase - 2023, 2024

Almena schools and Long Island schools formed through consolidation, their first school year was 1967-1968. The Almena High School mascot was Almena Coyotes with team colors of Orange and Black. The Long Island High School mascot was Long Island Leopards with team colors of Purple and Gold.
