= Foster, Nebraska =

Village in Pierce County, Nebraska, United States

- Village
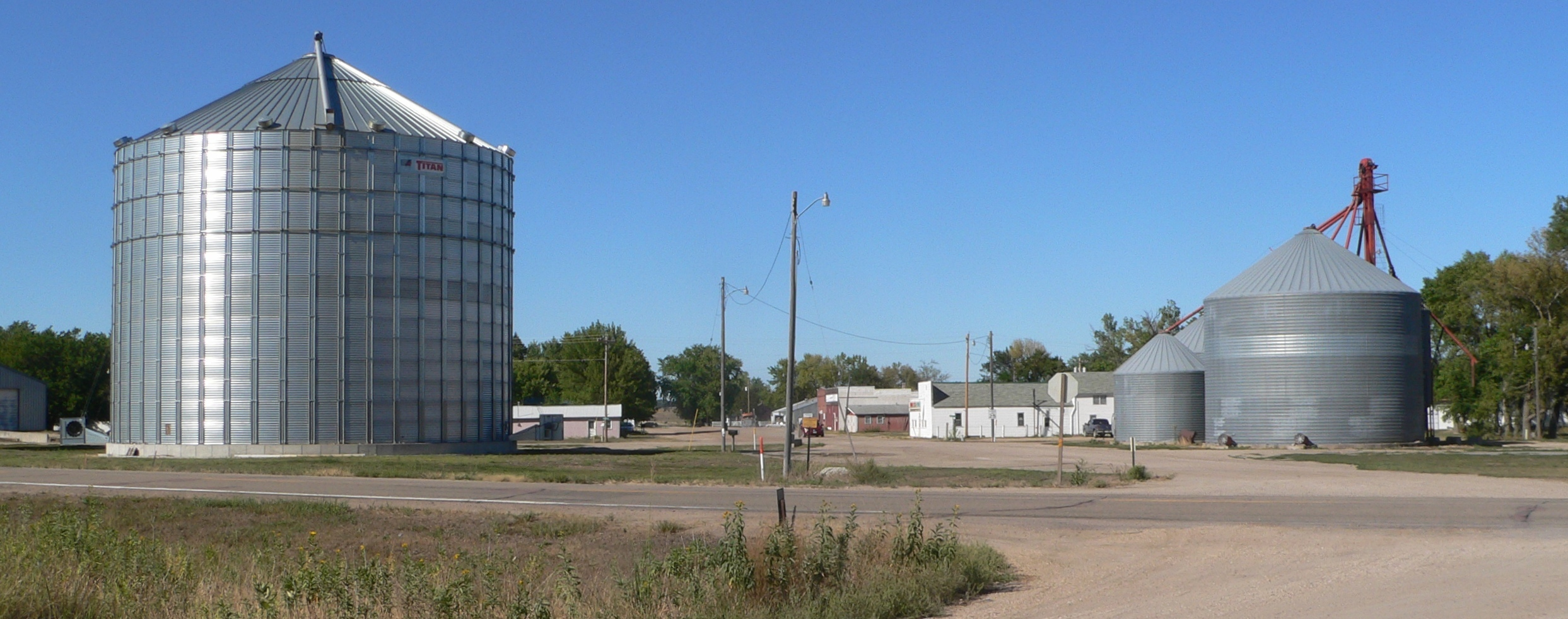
- Foster, seen from across Nebraska Highway 13, September 2013

- Location of Foster, Nebraska
- Coordinates: 42°16′29″N 97°39′54″W
- Country: United States
- State: Nebraska
- County: Pierce

Area
  - Total: 0.22 sq mi (0.58 km^{2})
  - Land: 0.22 sq mi (0.58 km^{2})
  - Water: 0 sq mi (0.00 km^{2})
- Elevation: 1,637 ft (499 m)

Population (2020)
  - Total: 42
  - Density: 188.4/sq mi (72.73/km^{2})
- Time zone: UTC-6 (Central (CST))
  - Summer (DST): UTC-5 (CDT)
- ZIP codes: 68737, 68765
- Area code: 402
- FIPS code: 31-17320
- GNIS feature ID: 2398907

Foster is a village in Pierce County, Nebraska, United States. It is part of the Norfolk, Nebraska Micropolitan Statistical Area. As of the 2020 census, Foster had a population of 42.

== History ==
A post office was established in Foster in 1886, and remained in operation until it was discontinued in 2002. The community was named for George Foster, an original owner of the town site.

== Geography ==
According to the United States Census Bureau, the village has a total area of 0.22 square miles (0.57 km^{2}), all land.

== Demographics ==
Historical population
Census	Pop.	Note	%±
1910	122		—
1920	140		14.8%
1930	122		−12.9%
1940	128		4.9%
1950	114		−10.9%
1960	60		−47.4%
1970	79		31.7%
1980	81		2.5%
1990	57		−29.6%
2000	63		10.5%
2010	51		−19.0%
2020	42		−17.6%
U.S. Decennial Census

=== 2010 census ===
As of the census of 2010, there were 51 people, 26 households, and 17 families residing in the village. The population density was 231.8 inhabitants per square mile (89.5/km^{2}). There were 32 housing units at an average density of 145.5 per square mile (56.2/km^{2}). The racial makeup of the village was 100.0% White.

There were 26 households, of which 23.1% had children under the age of 18 living with them, 53.8% were married couples living together, 11.5% had a female householder with no husband present, and 34.6% were non-families. 34.6% of all households were made up of individuals, and 11.5% had someone living alone who was 65 years of age or older. The average household size was 1.96 and the average family size was 2.41.

The median age in the village was 52.3 years. 15.7% of residents were under the age of 18; 3.9% were between the ages of 18 and 24; 17.6% were from 25 to 44; 39.3% were from 45 to 64; and 23.5% were 65 years of age or older. The gender makeup of the village was 51.0% male and 49.0% female.

=== 2000 census ===
As of the census of 2000, there were 63 people, 32 households, and 16 families residing in the village. The population density was 291.3 inhabitants per square mile (112.5/km^{2}). There were 34 housing units at an average density of 157.2 per square mile (60.7/km^{2}). The racial makeup of the village was 98.41% White and 1.59% Native American.

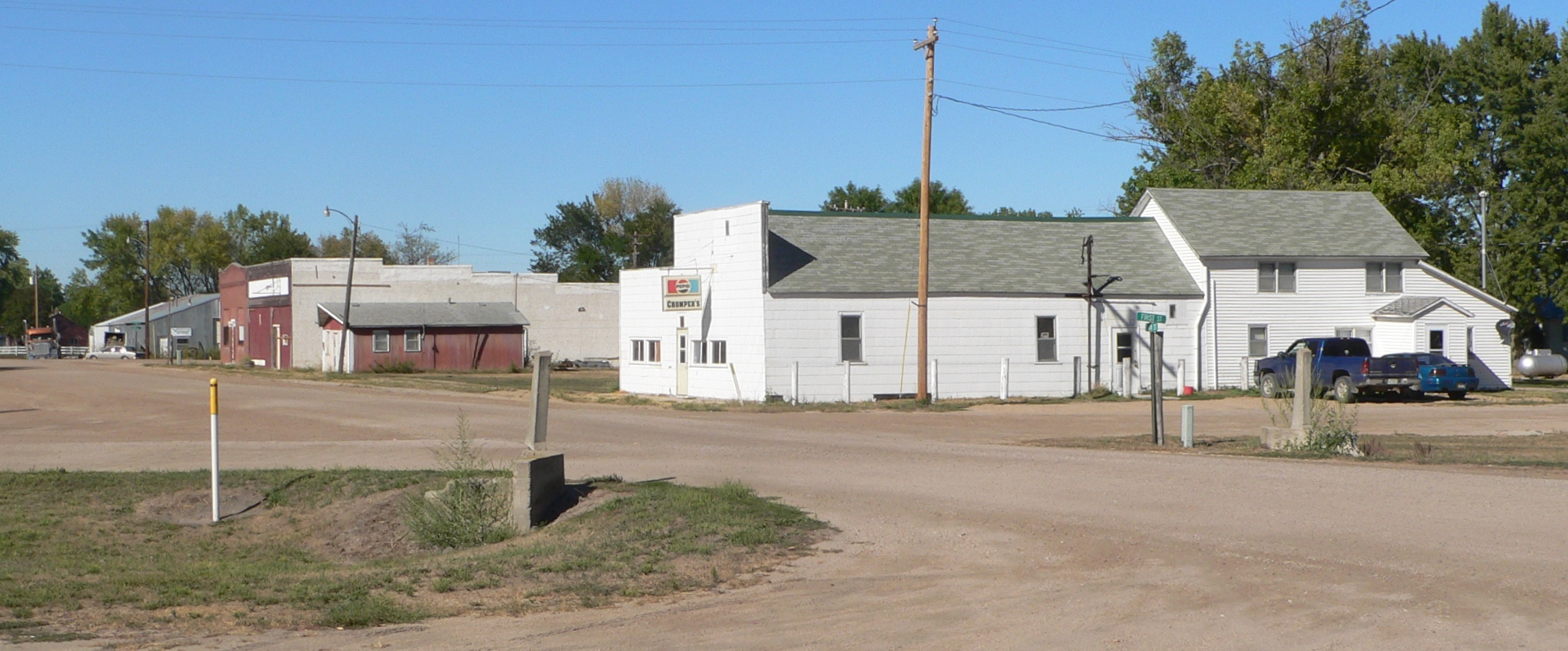
Foster, September 2012

There were 32 households, out of which 18.8% had children under the age of 18 living with them, 50.0% were married couples living together, 3.1% had a female householder with no husband present, and 46.9% were non-families. 46.9% of all households were made up of individuals, and 15.6% had someone living alone who was 65 years of age or older. The average household size was 1.97 and the average family size was 2.82.

In the village, the population was spread out, with 20.6% under the age of 18, 3.2% from 18 to 24, 27.0% from 25 to 44, 22.2% from 45 to 64, and 27.0% who were 65 years of age or older. The median age was 44 years. For every 100 females, there were 142.3 males. For every 100 females age 18 and over, there were 150.0 males.

As of 2000 the median income for a household in the village was $30,625, and the median income for a family was $41,250. Males had a median income of $26,250 versus $16,667 for females. The per capita income for the village was $17,127. There were no families and 5.4% of the population living below the poverty line, including no under eighteens and 25.0% of those over 64.

== See also ==
- List of municipalities in Nebraska
