= National Register of Historic Places listings in Butte County, South Dakota =

Location of Butte County in South Dakota

This is a list of the National Register of Historic Places listings in Butte County, South Dakota.

This is intended to be a complete list of the properties and districts on the National Register of Historic Places in Butte County, South Dakota, United States. The locations of National Register properties and districts for which the latitude and longitude coordinates are included below, may be seen in a map.

There are 39 properties and districts listed on the National Register in the county. Another 5 properties were once listed but have been removed.

This National Park Service list is complete through NPS recent listings posted December 12, 2025.

== Current listings ==
	Name on the Register	Image	Date listed	Location	City or town	Description
1	Belle Fourche Band Shell	Belle Fourche Band Shell	December 6, 2016 (#16000823)	Herrmann Park; 44°40′03″N 103°50′56″W	Belle Fourche	
2	Belle Fourche Commercial Historic District	Belle Fourche Commercial Historic District	April 27, 1982 (#82003917)	500-620 State St. and 608-622 5th Ave. 44°40′20″N 103°51′12″W	Belle Fourche	
3	Belle Fourche Dam	Belle Fourche Dam	November 23, 1977 (#77001239)	East of Belle Fourche off U.S. Route 212; 44°44′06″N 103°40′28″W	Belle Fourche	
4	Belle Fourche Experiment Farm		December 22, 1976 (#76001722)	Northwest of Newell off Highway 79; 44°43′45″N 103°27′01″W	Newell	
5	Charles Bolles House	Charles Bolles House	July 1, 1982 (#82003918)	919 State St. 44°40′18″N 103°50′44″W	Belle Fourche	
6	Butte County Courthouse and Historic Jail Building	Butte County Courthouse and Historic Jail Building	December 3, 1998 (#98001398)	839 5th Ave. 44°40′07″N 103°51′13″W	Belle Fourche	
7	Butte-Lawrence County Fairgrounds		April 30, 1986 (#86000934)	Southwest of Nisland; 44°40′02″N 103°34′04″W	Nisland	
8	Chambers Dugout		March 11, 2019 (#100003437)	19003 Rimrock Ranch; 44°38′54″N 104°00′59″W	Belle Fourche vicinity	
9	Ditchrider House		January 31, 2002 (#01000172)	North of U.S. Route 212; 44°40′46″N 103°33′31″W	Nisland	
10	First Congregational United Church of Christ	First Congregational United Church of Christ	July 30, 2013 (#13000571)	717 Jackson St; 44°40′02″N 103°50′59″W	Belle Fourche	
11	Fruitdale School	Fruitdale School	April 30, 1986 (#86000926)	High St. 44°40′12″N 103°41′36″W	Fruitdale	
12	Fruitdale Store	Fruitdale Store	April 30, 1986 (#86000927)	Water and Main Sts. 44°40′09″N 103°41′44″W	Fruitdale	
13	Carl Friedrick Gartner Homestead		April 30, 1986 (#86000930)	West of Highway 79; 44°42′29″N 103°29′21″W	Newell	
14	Thomas Haskins Gay House	Thomas Haskins Gay House	July 19, 1982 (#82003919)	704 Harding; 44°40′13″N 103°51′00″W	Belle Fourche	
15	Fred S. Harris House	Fred S. Harris House	July 13, 1988 (#88000575)	826 State St. 44°40′17″N 103°50′51″W	Belle Fourche	
16	Hay Creek Bridge		December 9, 1993 (#93001274)	8th Ave. over Hay Creek; 44°39′54″N 103°51′05″W	Belle Fourche	Replaced between 2015 and 2021
17	Hoover Store	Hoover Store	April 30, 1986 (#86000931)	Highway 79; 45°06′45″N 103°16′16″W	Hoover	
18	Alexander Hoover House		April 30, 1986 (#86000929)	Highway 79; 45°06′46″N 103°16′06″W	Hoover	
19	William Johnson House	William Johnson House	April 30, 1986 (#86000928)	High St. 44°40′14″N 103°41′38″W	Fruitdale	
20	William G. Kenaston House	William G. Kenaston House	February 23, 1984 (#84003246)	301 Dartmouth; 44°42′54″N 103°25′31″W	Newell	
21	Langdon School		April 30, 1986 (#86000935)	Snoma Rd. 44°38′59″N 103°28′45″W	Nisland	
22	Lincoln School	Lincoln School	February 9, 2001 (#01000098)	706 Jackson; 44°40′00″N 103°51′00″W	Belle Fourche	
23	Minnesela Bridge		December 9, 1993 (#93001277)	Local road over Redwater Creek; 44°38′28″N 103°49′19″W	Belle Fourche	
24	Newell Depot Bridge		August 5, 1999 (#99000953)	Local road over Horse Creek; 44°42′20″N 103°29′10″W	Newell	
25	Newell High School	Newell High School	May 1, 1986 (#86000947)	Dartmouth St. 44°43′04″N 103°25′34″W	Newell	
26	Roosevelt School	Roosevelt School	March 14, 2019 (#100003438)	1010 State St. 44°40′17″N 103°50′42″W	Belle Fourche	
27	John Aaron Scotney House	John Aaron Scotney House	January 3, 1978 (#78002541)	830 9th St. 44°40′09″N 103°50′55″W	Belle Fourche	
28	Charles and Eleanor Small House	Charles and Eleanor Small House	November 1, 1991 (#91001617)	825 5th Ave. 44°40′09″N 103°51′10″W	Belle Fourche	
29	Snoma Finnish Cemetery		November 13, 1985 (#85003492)	3.5 miles southeast of Fruitdale; 44°37′59″N 103°41′06″W	Fruitdale	
30	Soper-Behymer Ranch		June 6, 1986 (#86001262)	10046 Highway 34; 44°38′35″N 104°02′37″W	Belle Fourche	
31	South Dakota Dept. of Transportation Bridge No. 10-109-360		December 9, 1993 (#93001275)	Local road over the Diversion Dam Inlet Canal in the Belle Fourche Irrigation District; 44°41′27″N 103°49′52″W	Belle Fourche	
32	South Dakota Dept. of Transportation Bridge No. 10-270-338		February 18, 2000 (#00000124)	Local road over Horse Creek; 44°43′21″N 103°30′22″W	Newell	Duplicate of Stonelake Bridge 86000932
33	Stonelake Bridge		April 30, 1986 (#86000932)	Winkler Rd. 44°43′21″N 103°30′24″W	Newell	Moved to Newell Golf Course in 2002
34	Tri State Bakery	Tri State Bakery	August 5, 1993 (#93000781)	705 State St. 44°40′18″N 103°50′58″W	Belle Fourche	
35	Vale Bridge		August 5, 1999 (#99000954)	Local road over the Belle Fourche River; 44°37′45″N 103°23′13″W	Vale	
36	Vale Cut Off Belle Fourche River Bridge		April 30, 1986 (#86000937)	7 miles southwest of Newell; 44°40′17″N 103°29′32″W	Belle Fourche	
37	Vale School		August 1, 1984 (#84003250)	Off Highway 79; 44°37′14″N 103°23′53″W	Vale	
38	Nicholas Augustus Viken Homestead		April 30, 1986 (#86000933)	North of Hope Cemetery Rd. 44°42′51″N 103°28′35″W	Newell	
39	Wide Awake Grocery Building	Wide Awake Grocery Building	March 30, 1978 (#78002542)	520 State St. 44°40′15″N 103°51′02″W	Belle Fourche	

== Former listings ==
	Name on the Register	Image	Date listed	Date removed	Location	City or town	Description
1	Belle Fourche River Bridge		April 30, 1986 (#86000923)	August 1, 1996	NE of Belle Fourche of US 212	Belle Fourche vicinity	Rural Butte and Meade Counties MRA
2	Fruitdale Bridge		April 30, 1986 (#86000925)	August 1, 1996	1/2 Mi S of Fruitdale	Fruitdale vicinity	Rural Butte and Meade Counties MRA
3	Nisland Bridge		April 30, 1986 (#86000936)	March 26, 2008	S of Nisland on Section Rd.	Nisland	
4	Olson Bridge		April 30, 1986 (#86000924)	March 26, 2008	NE of Belle Fourche	Belle Fourche	
5	South Dakota Dept. of Transportation Bridge No. 10-112-355		December 9, 1993 (#93001276)	December 15, 1999	Diversion Dam Rd. over Crow Cr.	Belle Fourche vicinity	

== See also ==
- List of National Historic Landmarks in South Dakota
- National Register of Historic Places listings in South Dakota
