= Gay House =

Gay House may refer to:

- Gay House (Montgomery, Alabama)
- Ebenezer Gay House, Sharon, Connecticut
- Mary Gay House, Decatur, Georgia
- Charles Gay House, Waimea, Hawaii
- Wilbur D. and Hattie Cannon House, Iowa City, Iowa, also known as the Cannon-Gay House
- Andrew H. Gay House, Plaquemine, Louisiana, listed on the National Register of Historic Places (NRHP)
- Rev. Samuel Gay House, Hubbardston, Massachusetts
- Tolman-Gay House, Needham, Massachusetts
- Jared H. Gay House, Crystal Valley, Michigan
- C. E. Gay House, Starkville, Mississippi, listed on the NRHP
- Edward Gay House, Kalispell, Montana, listed on the NRHP
- Alpheus Gay House, Manchester, New Hampshire
- Thomas Haskins Gay House, Belle Fourche, South Dakota, listed on the NRHP
- Daniel Gay House, Stockbridge, Vermont
