= Butte–Lawrence County Fairgrounds =

- U.S. National Register of Historic Places
- U.S. Historic district
- Location within South Dakota Location within the United States
- Nearest city: Nisland, South Dakota
- Coordinates: 44°40′04″N 103°34′11.8″W
- Area: 24 acres (9.7 ha)
- Built: 1921
- Built by: Earl Wilson
- Architectural style: Vernacular, octagonal barn
- MPS: Rural Butte and Meade Counties MRA
- NRHP reference No.: 86000934
- Added to NRHP: April 30, 1986

The Butte–Lawrence County Fairgrounds are a historic fairground complex located near Nisland, South Dakota, United States. County fair celebrations for Butte and Lawrence Counties have been held there annually since 1921. The fairground and its buildings were listed on the National Register of Historic Places in 1986.

== History ==
The first fairs in Butte County were held in the summer at Newell and Vale before being moved to Belle Fourche. The land deed for the current site was purchased in 1919. Earl Wilson was hired to construct the buildings and improve the land, for which the county allocated $7,500. The first fair at the complex was held from September 27–29, 1921.

On September 1, 1927, President Calvin Coolidge and his First Lady Grace attended the Butte County Fair. On this visit he was gifted a pair of lambs, and in a speech later that day, he remarked he had been "promised a 160-acre farm in this fertile valley if I would return to live here".

Two of the fairground's rectangular buildings held German prisoners of war during World War II. These POWs were put to work harvesting sugar beets on local farms.

Originally, the fairground only served the Butte County Fair. In 1979, the Lawrence County Fair merged into Butte County's event, and the first joint Butte–Lawrence County Fair was held the following year. On April 30, 1986, 24 acres (9.7 ha) of the fairgrounds were listed as a historic district on the National Register of Historic Places.

In 2015, a hailstorm did heavy damage to the fairgrounds, causing somewhere between $350,000-$500,000 in damages. All of the buildings suffered roof and exterior damage; some, like the grandstand, were so badly damaged that they had to be demolished. Every roof had to be replaced, windows and doors were broken, and the electrical lines were downed. The 2020 fair was cancelled due to COVID-19 but festivities resumed for the 2021 season.

== Layout ==
The fairgrounds sit about 0.5 miles (0.80 km) southwest of Nisland, South Dakota, near the border of Butte and Lawrence Counties on a floodplain of the Belle Fourche River. The complex covers 40 acres (16 ha) and is one of the largest county fairgrounds in the state. Several cottonwood trees shade the site.

The fairground's centerpiece contributing property is the 2 1/2-story-tall octagonal barn. It is built of a wooden frame and has hardwood floors and a wood-shingled roof. Small, square-shaped windows front every wall, including the octagonal cupola at the top of the building; these upper floors are accessed by a cast-iron interior stairway. The interior contains only the one large room with a balcony overlooking it. This barn serves as a central pavilion for exhibitions.

Before its demolition, the largest contributing structure was the grandstand, which was used for viewing events on the field. It was completely constructed out of wood and was partially sheltered by an shed roof, and open on both ends. Other contributing buildings include four exhibition buildings, six barns, a 4-H building, a groundkeeper's house, two outhouses, and a concessions building.

== See also ==
- List of octagonal buildings and structures in the United States
- South Dakota State Fair
