= Kenaston =

Kenaston may refer to:

- Kenaston, Saskatchewan, village in Canada
- Nancy Kenaston (1920-2012), British journalist
- Kenaston House, historic house of Rancho Mirage, California
- William G. Kenaston House, historic house of Newell, South Dakota
