= Snoma Finnish Cemetery =

Cemetery in Butte County, South Dakota, US

- U.S. National Register of Historic Places
- Location within South Dakota Location within the United States
- Location: Butte County, South Dakota, United States
- Nearest city: Fruitdale, South Dakota
- Coordinates: 44°37′59″N 103°41′06″W
- Built: 1887
- MPS: Architecture of Finnish Settlement TR
- NRHP reference No.: 85003492
- Added to NRHP: November 13, 1985

The Snoma Finnish Cemetery is a cemetery located about 3 1/2 miles (5.6 kilometers) southeast of Fruitdale, in Butte County, South Dakota, United States. In 1885, a small Finnish community called Snoma was founded nearby, and the residents built the cemetery. It was added to the National Register of Historic Places on November 13, 1985. The cemetery has rarely had new burials since the 1980s, with only two occurring recently in 2019 and 2022 respectively.

== History ==
In 1885, about 40 Finnish families settled in the area and attempted to farm the land. The town had a hotel, post office, and blacksmith. John Lakson, the town's interpreter, submitted the name of either "Suomi" or "Suoma," which is Finnish for Finland, to the Post Office Department, but his handwriting was misread.

== Geography ==
The cemetery and town rests in Butte County, South Dakota. It is located about one-half mile south of the Belle Fourche River, one-half mile southeast of Fruitdale, and about 10 miles east of Belle Fourche, South Dakota.
