= Stonelake Bridge =

- U.S. National Register of Historic Places
- Nearest city: Newell, South Dakota
- Coordinates: 44.718748°N 103.45425°W
- Area: less than one acre
- Built: 1910, 1972
- Built by: Canton Bridge Co.
- Architectural style: Pony truss
- MPS: Rural Butte and Meade Counties MRA
- NRHP reference No.: 86000932
- Added to NRHP: April 30, 1986

The Stonelake Bridge, on Winkler Rd. about 4 miles (6.4 km) west of Newell, in Butte County, South Dakota, was listed on the National Register of Historic Places in 1986. It was manufactured in 1910. Also known as the Horse Creek Bridge, it is a pony truss lattice bridge built by the Canton Bridge Co. The bridge was moved in 1972.

It is significant as "the only single span Pony truss lattice bridge in west central South Dakota".

The bridge was moved again to the Newell Golf Club.
