= Union Township, Butte County, South Dakota =

Township in Butte County, South Dakota

Coordinates: 43.9811°N 98.0306°W

Union Township is one of the two townships of Butte County, South Dakota, United States; virtually all the rest of the county is unorganized territory. It lies on the eastern edge of the county.
