= Ditchrider House =

Historic house in South Dakota, United States

- U.S. National Register of Historic Places
- Location within South Dakota Location within the United States
- Location: North of U.S. Route 212, in or near Nisland, South Dakota
- Coordinates: 44°40′46″N 103°33′31″W
- Area: 25 acres (10 ha)
- Built: 1916
- Built by: US Bureau of Reclamation
- Architectural style: Bungalow/craftsman
- NRHP reference No.: 01000172
- Added to NRHP: January 31, 2002

The Ditchrider House, located north of U.S. Route 212 in or near Nisland, South Dakota, is listed on the National Register of Historic Places.

The house is one of eleven houses used by ditchriders on the Belle Fourche Irrigation Project. It is a cottage built in 1916 in Bungalow architecture / Craftsman architecture by the U.S. Bureau of Reclamation. The house is a one-story building with about 800 square feet (74 m^{2}) area. The listing included two contributing buildings and contributing structures on 25 acres (10 ha).
