= Alexander Hoover House =

Historic house in South Dakota, United States

- U.S. National Register of Historic Places
- Location: SD 59, Hoover, South Dakota
- Coordinates: 45°06′46″N 97°16′06″W
- Area: 3 acres (1.2 ha)
- Built: c.1909
- Architectural style: Rectangular pen
- MPS: Rural Butte and Meade Counties MRA
- NRHP reference No.: 86000929
- Added to NRHP: April 30, 1986

The Alexander Hoover House, located on South Dakota Highway 79 near Hoover, South Dakota, USA, was listed in the National Register of Historic Places in 1986. The listing included six contributing buildings and a contributing structure.

The one-and-a-half-story main house, built c.1909, has a steep gable roof. It was built for Alexander Hoover, the second postmaster of the town Hoover, which was named for John Hoover.
