= Vale Bridge =

- U.S. National Register of Historic Places
- Location within South Dakota Location within the United States
- Nearest city: Vale, South Dakota
- Coordinates: 44°37′45″N 103°23′13″W
- Area: less than one acre
- Built: 1906
- Built by: Canton Bridge Company
- Architectural style: Pratt through truss
- MPS: Historic Bridges in South Dakota MPS
- NRHP reference No.: 99000954
- Added to NRHP: August 5, 1999

The Vale Bridge near Vale, South Dakota brings a local road over the Belle Fourche River. Built in 1906, It was listed on the National Register of Historic Places in 1999.

It is a Pratt through truss bridge produced by the Canton Bridge Company. Its main span is a 142 feet (43 m) steel, pin-connected truss. Together with four timber approach spans, it is 236 feet (72 m) long.

It is located one mile east and 0.6 miles north of Vale.
