= Carl Friedrick Gartner Homestead =

Historic house in South Dakota, United States

- U.S. National Register of Historic Places
- Location within South Dakota Location within the United States
- Location: 3 miles (4.8 km) west of SD 79, near Newell, South Dakota
- Coordinates: 44°42′29″N 97°29′21″W
- Area: less than one acre
- Built: 1882
- Built by: Gartner, Carl; Viken, Julius
- MPS: Rural Butte and Meade Counties MRA
- NRHP reference No.: 86000930
- Added to NRHP: April 30, 1986

The Carl Friedrick Gartner Homestead, located west of South Dakota Highway 79 near Newell, South Dakota, was settled in 1882 and was proved up in 1892. It was listed on the National Register of Historic Places in 1986.

The structure of greatest historical interest is a single pen log cabin with full dovetail notching which was built in 1882. It was moved to the present site from a timber claim not far away, in the 1890s. The structure was placed onto a concrete foundation in 1949. The site's original log barn and dugout house were destroyed long ago.
