= Belle Fourche Experiment Farm =

- U.S. National Register of Historic Places
- Nearest city: Newell, South Dakota
- Coordinates: 44°43′51″N 103°27′04″W
- Area: 25 acres (10 ha)
- Built: 1907
- Built by: U.S. Department of Agriculture
- NRHP reference No.: 76001722
- Added to NRHP: December 22, 1976

The Belle Fourche Experiment Farm, located northwest of Newell, South Dakota off Highway 79, was listed on the National Register of Historic Places in 1976. The listing included seven contributing buildings on 25 acres (10 ha).

It is an experimental farm of the U.S. Department of Agriculture which has also known as the Newell Field Station.
