= Jared H. Gay House =

Historic house in Michigan, United States

- U.S. National Register of Historic Places
- Michigan State Historic Site
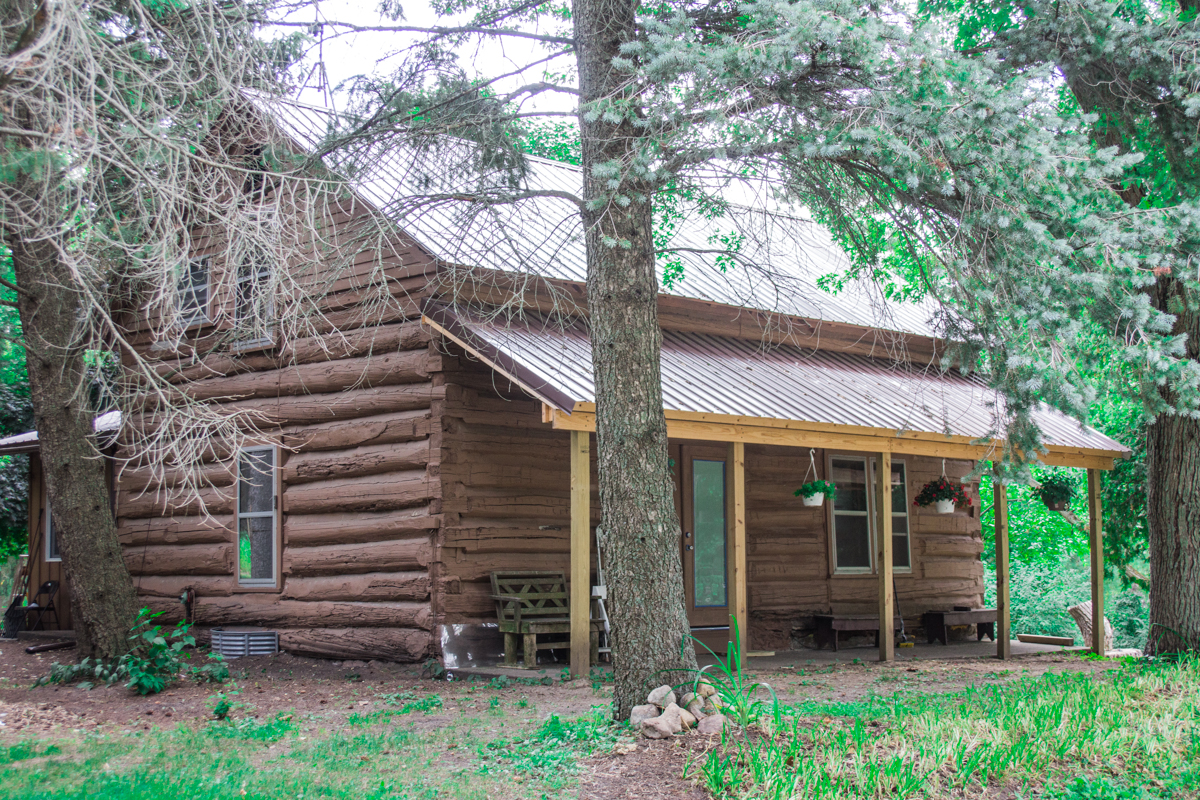

- Location within Michigan Location within the United States
- Interactive map
- Location: Rt. 2, 128th Ave., Crystal Valley, Michigan
- Coordinates: 43°46′33″N 86°14′16″W
- Area: less than one acre
- Built: 1861
- Architectural style: Log house
- NRHP reference No.: 88003235

Significant dates
- Added to NRHP: January 26, 1989
- Designated MSHS: May 15, 1987

The Jared H. Gay House is a log house located Route 2, 128th Avenue, in Crystal Valley, Michigan. It was designated a Michigan State Historic Site in 1987 and listed on the National Register of Historic Places in 1989.

== History ==
Jared H. Gay was born in New York in 1830. He moved west to operate sawmills in Lyons, Michigan and Fulton, Ohio, then in 1857 moved to Muskegon to operate a blacksmith's shop. In 1861, Gay arrived in Crystal Valley as a government-appointed blacksmith, serving the local Ottawa and Chippewa population in accordance with the recent treaty which had been signed in 1855. There he and his wife Catherine built this house.

The Gays were the first European settlers in what is now Crystal Township, and were instrumental in the early development of the area around Crystal Valley (Catherine Gay christened the area "Crystal Valley"). Jared Gay worked as the government blacksmith until about 1865. After this, he ran a blacksmith shop located across the street from the house until the shop burned in 1877. By that time, the Gays had begun operating a small sawmill, and had platted out the village of Crystal Valley. In 1882, they constructed a frame house (destroyed in 1965) and moved out of this log structure.

In 1902, the Gays sold the property on which this house sits. Mark and Calla Krieger purchased the house in 1954, and renovated it as a weekend home. They lived there until at least 1989.

== Description ==
The Jared H. Gay House is two-story structure, measuring 20 feet by 30 feet, and built of squared and notched logs on a fieldstone foundation. It is built in an I-shape, with a gable roof covered with asphalt shingles. The gables are timber-framed and covered with clapboard. A single story wing is attached; the original open porch and rear wing have been removed. Additionally, the original front facade with two entrances and two double hung windows was updated to a single entrance with sidelights and a pair of double hung windows.

The interior was originally divided up into four approximately equal-sized rooms on the first floor, with a steep narrow staircase leading to the second floor. This has been remodeled into a single large room with a more modern staircase.
