= Daniel Gay House =

Historic house in Vermont, United States

- U.S. National Register of Historic Places
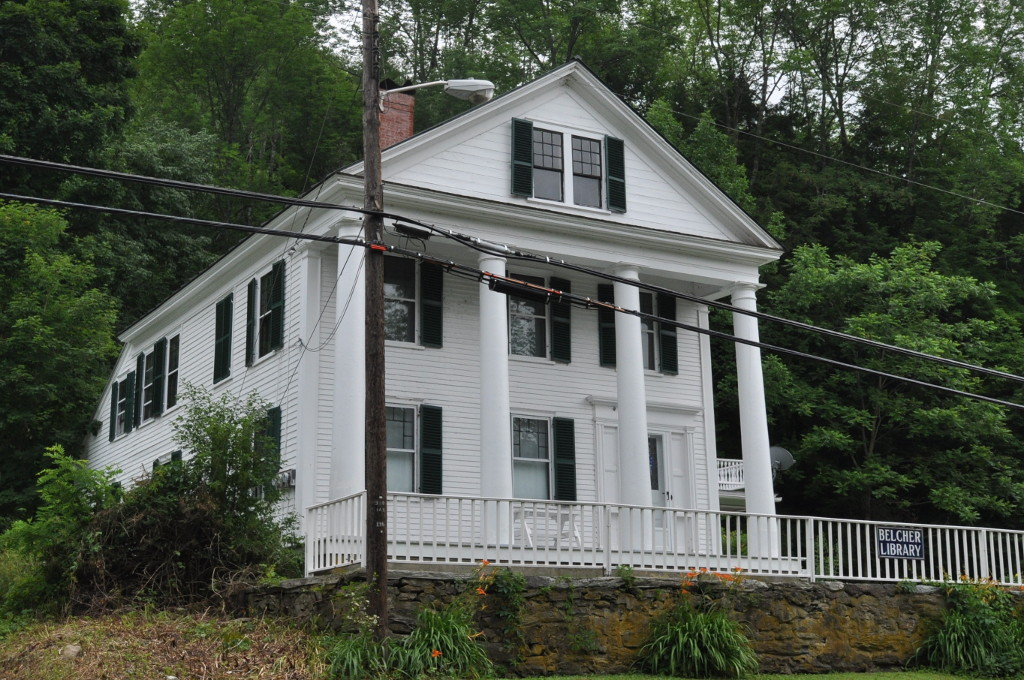

- Location within Vermont
- Location: VT 107, Gaysville, Vermont
- Coordinates: 43°46′42″N 72°41′53″W
- Area: 1 acre (0.40 ha)
- Built: 1835
- Built by: Gay, Daniel
- Architectural style: Greek Revival, Queen Anne
- NRHP reference No.: 78000252
- Added to NRHP: January 9, 1978

The Belcher Memorial Library is a small public library serving the town of Stockbridge, Vermont, United States. It is located in the Daniel Gay House, an 1835 Greek Revival house built by Daniel Gay, a mill owner and namesake of the community. The building, one of the few to survive the 1927 flooding that destroyed most of the village of Gaysville was listed on the National Register of Historic Places in 1978.

== Description and history ==
Stockbridge's Belcher Library stands on the southeast side of Vermont Route 107, just north of its junction with Bridge Street, in the village of Gaysville. It is a 2 1/2-story wood-frame building, with a gabled roof and clapboarded exterior. The front facade is adorned with a Greek temple front, consisting of four smooth Doric columns rising to an entablature and fully pedimented gable. The front entrance is in the rightmost of three bays, with sash windows in the other bays, and a pair of sash windows in the gable. The small front yard is set off by a low fence on top of a fieldstone retaining wall.

The library was built as a private residence in 1835 for Daniel Gay, who owned a textile mill on the White River, which Route 107 parallels. Daniel and his brother Jeremiah moved to Stockbridge in the 1820s, and built the mill in what became known as Gaysville in 1832. The mill continued to be operated by Gay family members until its destruction (along with most of the village) in Vermont's devastating 1927 floods. In 1937 the house was given by Lucia Gay for use by the Belcher Library Association.

The Belcher Library Association was founded in 1896 as a vehicle for preserving the private collection of William Belcher, who had bequeathed it and an endowment for its maintenance. The association took formal title to the house in 1944.

== See also ==
- National Register of Historic Places listings in Windsor County, Vermont
