= Belle Fourche Band Shell =

- U.S. National Register of Historic Places
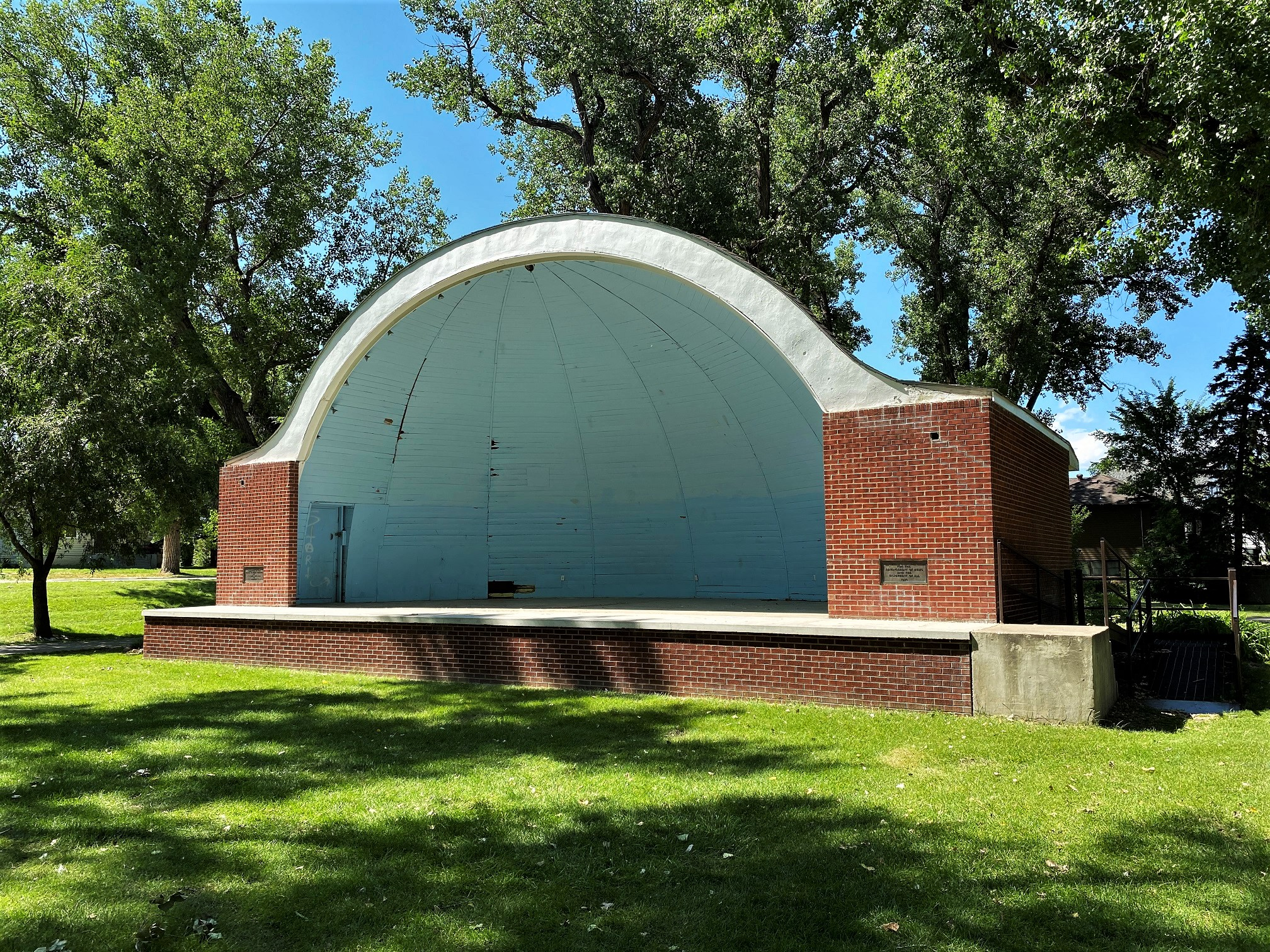

- Location within South Dakota Location within the United States
- Location: Herrmann Park; Belle Fourche, South Dakota
- Coordinates: 44°40′03″N 103°50′56″W
- Area: less than one acre
- Built: 1954
- Built by: Carl Anderson & Son
- NRHP reference No.: 16000823
- Added to NRHP: December 6, 2016

The Belle Fourche Band Shell is a band shell in Herrmann Park in Belle Fourche, South Dakota. It was listed on the National Register of Historic Places in 2016.

The band shell was deemed significant for having "served as a focal point for outdoor band concerts, speeches, performances, and other gatherings since its construction in 1954" and "as a local vernacular adaptation of a band shell, a resource type made popular throughout the country in the 1920s and 1930s. Although not built until the 1950s, it embodies the features of earlier and larger band shells as interpreted by a local builder/contractor."

It was built at instigation of Dr. John L. Chassell who donated $4,000 funds towards its construction in 1954. Chassells admired Belle Fourche when he visited from northern Iowa in 1906, and promptly moved his medical practice to Belle Fourche. He married May Haims in 1909 and they had four children. Chassell was "a well-respected doctor and very active in community activities", including in the Belle Fourche Commercial Club and the local Masonic lodge. Three of the children participated in band and performed "in park concerts with the Cowboy Band", which was a municipal band formed in 1922; there were previous bands as far back as 1897.

Only one firm, Carl Anderson & Son, bid on constructing the complete band shell. The bid, for 5,210, was covered by Chassell's donation plus funds from a park trust account. Reportedly "Most builders in the area refused to bid on the project because they didn’t think the curved ceiling and roof could be built. Bud [Anderson] later joked that he and his dad were 'too dumb to know that, so we just did it.' The Andersons set up an on-site “shop” to fabricate the trusses by laminating six-foot lengths of 2 x 6 fir lumber and then sawing them into the needed shapes. Covering the outside of the dome with shiplap and slate roofing wasn't difficult, but covering the inside of the dome proved to be a challenge. They chose to use six-inch tongue-and-groove flooring material that had to be bent inward and downward at the same time. This required true ingenuity and the Andersons, with local blacksmith Ray Oliver, designed and fabricated a tool that made this bending process not only possible, but easy to use. This tool is apparently still in Bud's collection at hishome." Dr. Chassell also suggested the city should install permanent seating in front of the band shell, but this was not ever done.
