= Rev. Samuel Gay House =

Historic house in Massachusetts, United States

- U.S. National Register of Historic Places
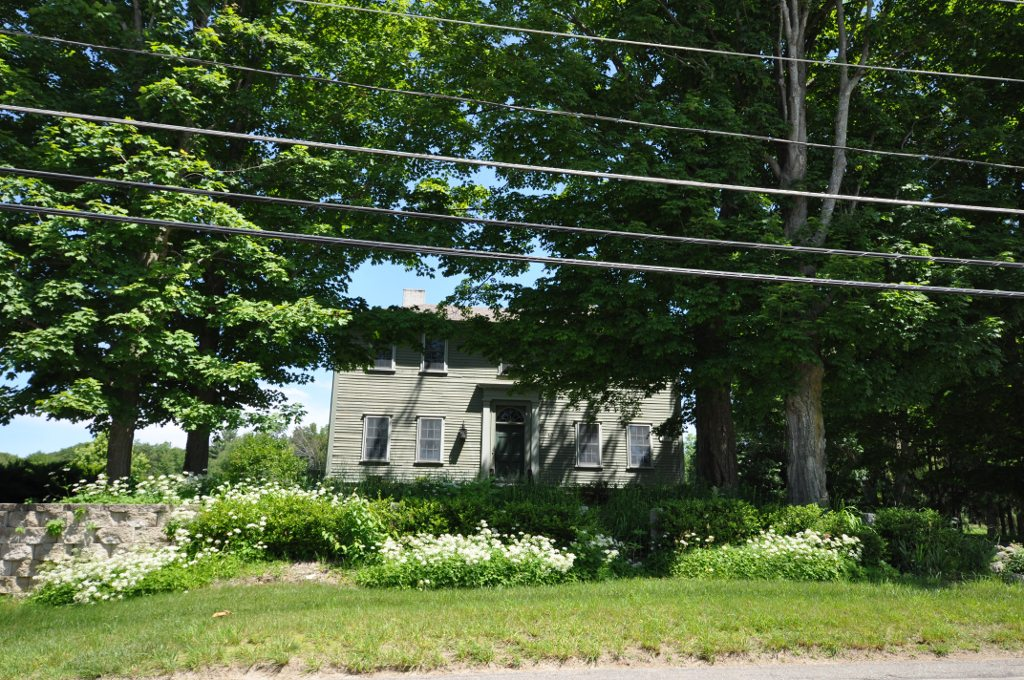

- Location within Massachusetts Location within the United States
- Location: Hubbardston, Massachusetts
- Coordinates: 42°28′44″N 72°0′55″W
- Built: 1817
- Architectural style: Early Republic, Federal
- NRHP reference No.: 97001450
- Added to NRHP: November 24, 1997

The Rev. Samuel Gay House is a historic house at 10 Williamsville Road in Hubbardston, Massachusetts. This 2 1/2-story wood-frame house was built in 1817 for Reverend Samuel Gay, a controversial local minister. The house is a fine local example of Federal style architecture, particularly noted for its front door surround, which has pilasters and a semicircular fanlight topped by an entablature. Reverend Gay was a polarizing figure in the local Congregational Church, which split in 1827, with Gay leading the formation of the Evangelical Congregational Church, which was more Calvinist in its teaching than the Unitarians who remained in the old congregation.

The house was listed on the National Register of Historic Places in 1997.

== See also ==
- National Register of Historic Places listings in Worcester County, Massachusetts
