= William G. Kenaston House =

Historic house in South Dakota, United States

- U.S. National Register of Historic Places
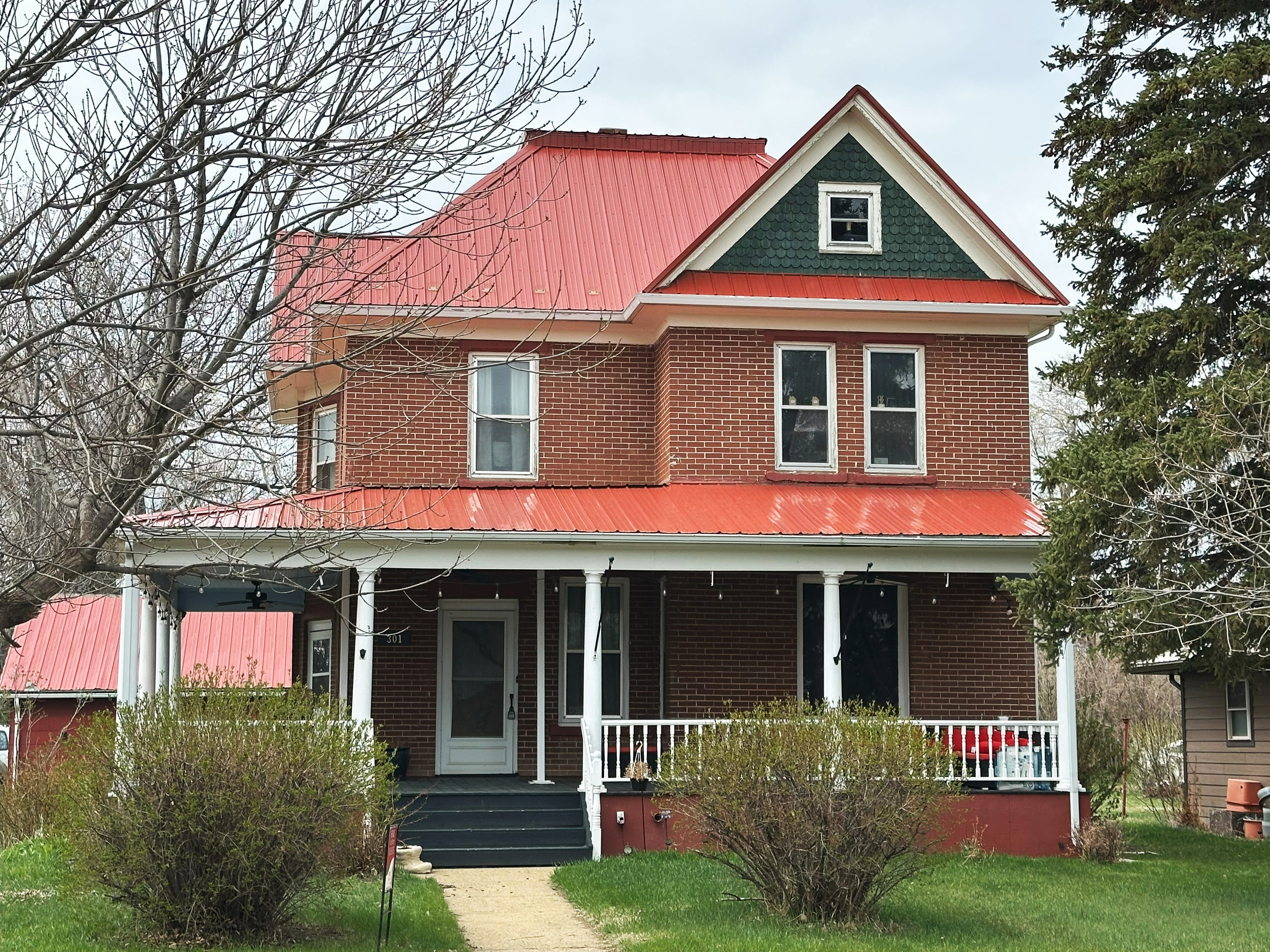
- William G. Kenaston House in 2025

- Location within South Dakota Location within the United States
- Location: 301 Dartmouth; Newell, South Dakota
- Coordinates: 44°42′54″N 103°25′31″W
- Area: less than one acre
- Built: 1911
- NRHP reference No.: 84003246
- Added to NRHP: February 23, 1984

The William G. Kenaston House, located at 301 Dartmouth in Newell, South Dakota, was built in 1911. It was listed on the National Register of Historic Places in 1984.

It is a 2 1/2-story brick house with a hipped roof. It has a wood porch supported by Doric columns wrapping around two sides of the house.
