= Fruitdale School =

South Dakota, United States historic place

- U.S. National Register of Historic Places
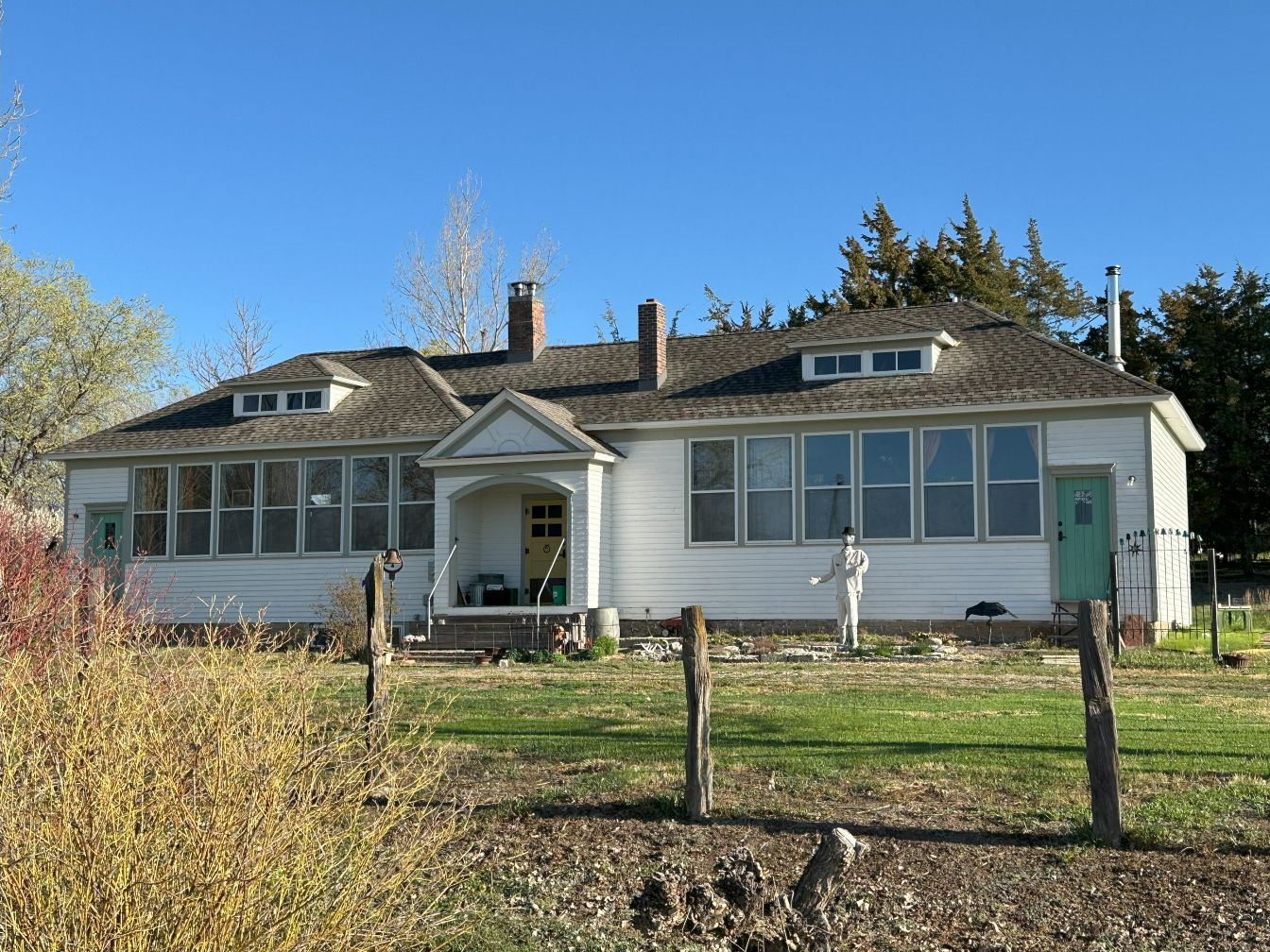
- The building in 2025

- Location within South Dakota Location within the United States
- Location: High St. Fruitdale, South Dakota
- Coordinates: 44.6699°N 103.6932°W
- Area: less than one acre
- Built: 1926
- Architectural style: Rectangular pen
- MPS: Rural Butte and Meade Counties MRA
- NRHP reference No.: 86000926
- Added to NRHP: April 30, 1986

The Fruitdale School, on High St. at the northwest edge of Fruitdale, South Dakota, was built in 1926. It was listed on the National Register of Historic Places in 1986.

It is a wood-frame building with a projecting, pedimented entry. It was deemed " significant in both the areas of architecture and education because of its unusual style and exceptional state of preservation, and as the only school in the history of the town of Fruitdale. In addition, the school is architecturally, the most imposing structure in the community with its simple classic detailing it reaches a level of style not found in most rural schools."

The property includes a shed-like building and about 20 beehives.
