= Alpheus Gay House =

Historic house in New Hampshire, United States

- U.S. National Register of Historic Places
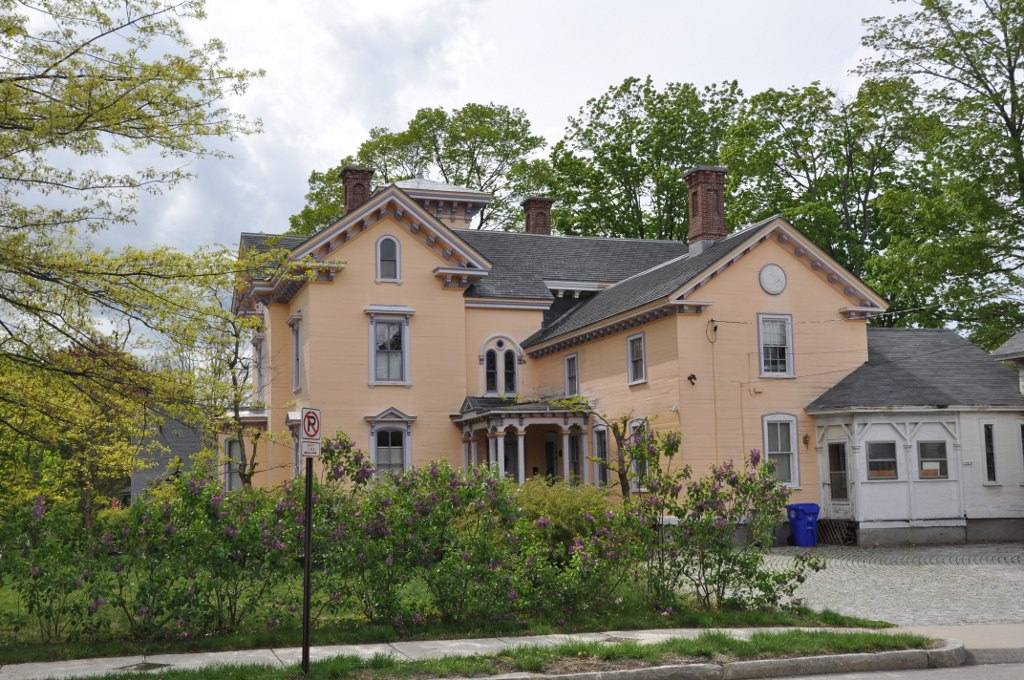

- Location within New Hampshire Location within the United States
- Location: 184 Myrtle St., Manchester, New Hampshire
- Coordinates: 42°59′53″N 71°27′25″W
- Area: 0.3 acres (0.12 ha)
- Built: 1870
- Built by: Gay, Alpheus
- Architectural style: Italian Villa
- NRHP reference No.: 82001682
- Added to NRHP: March 9, 1982

The Alpheus Gay House is a historic house at 184 Myrtle Street in Manchester, New Hampshire. Built c. 1870 by Alpheus Gay, a local building contractor, it is one of the state's most elaborate Italianate houses. The house was owned for a time by the nearby Currier Gallery of Art, but is now in private hands. It was listed on the National Register of Historic Places in 1982.

== Description and history ==
The Alpheus Gay House is located in a predominantly residential area northeast of downtown Manchester, at the northwest corner of Myrtle and Beach streets. It is a 2½-story wood-frame structure, with gabled roof section and a flushboarded exterior. It has complex massing, a roofline studded with paired brackets on the main block and modillions on the servants' wing, and a three-story tower above its main entry. The main entrance is sheltered by a porch with square posts and decorative arches below the cornice. Windows have a variety of surrounding treatments, including rounded arches, peaked lintels, and bracketed flat lintels with projecting cornices. A carriage house is attached to the house's eastern servants' wing, with vertical board siding and simpler but similar styling to that on the house.

The house was built about 1870 by Alpheus Gay, a prominent local contractor, as his personal residence. It appears to have borrowed heavily from design patterns published by Andrew Jackson Downing and Calvert Vaux. It is a late but particularly well-executed example of the Italian villa style promoted by those architects, and has undergone only modest alterations since its construction.

== See also ==
- National Register of Historic Places listings in Hillsborough County, New Hampshire
