= Gay House (Montgomery, Alabama) =

Historic house in Alabama, United States

- U.S. National Register of Historic Places
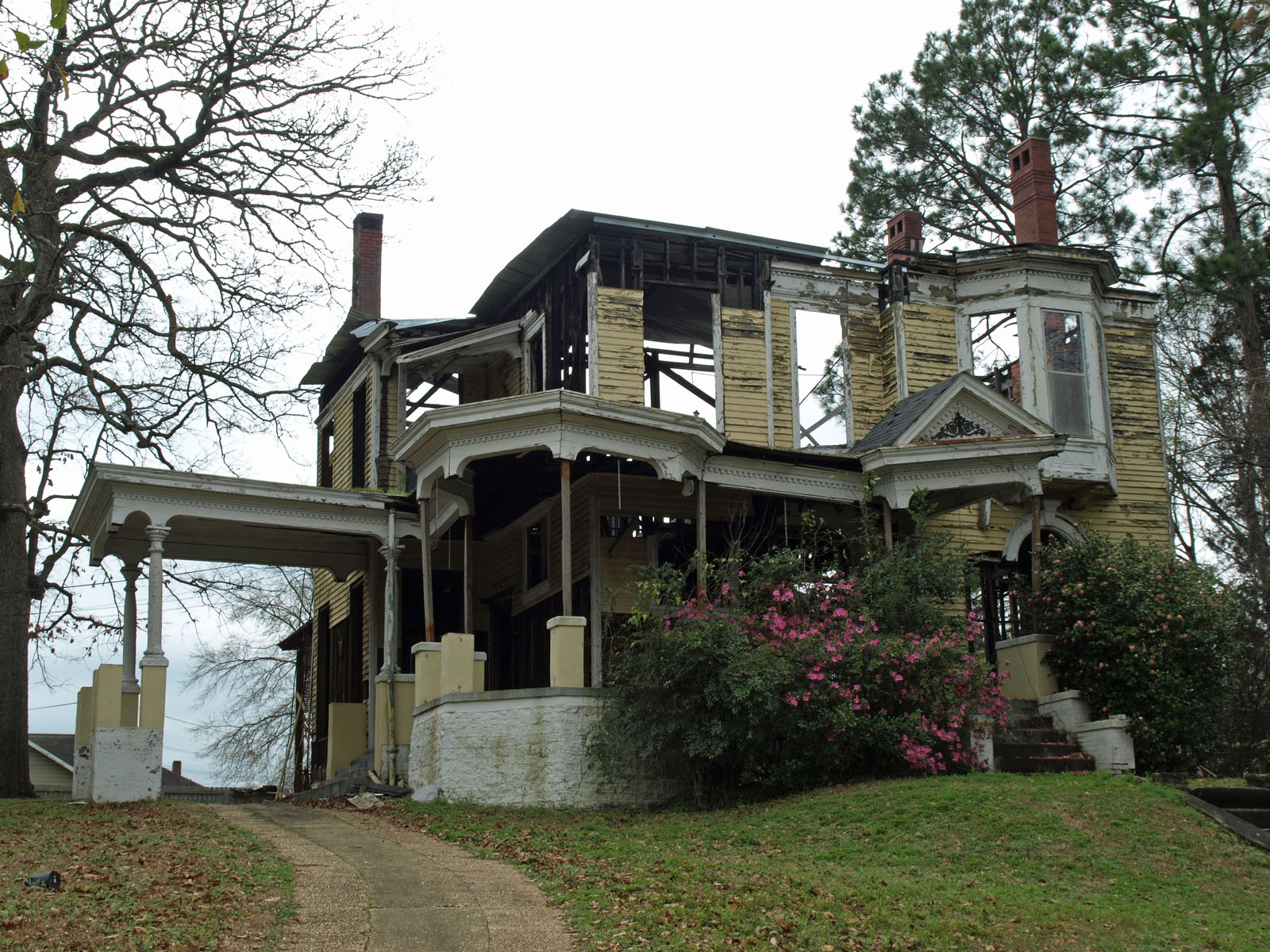
- The Gay House in February 2012, following a fire

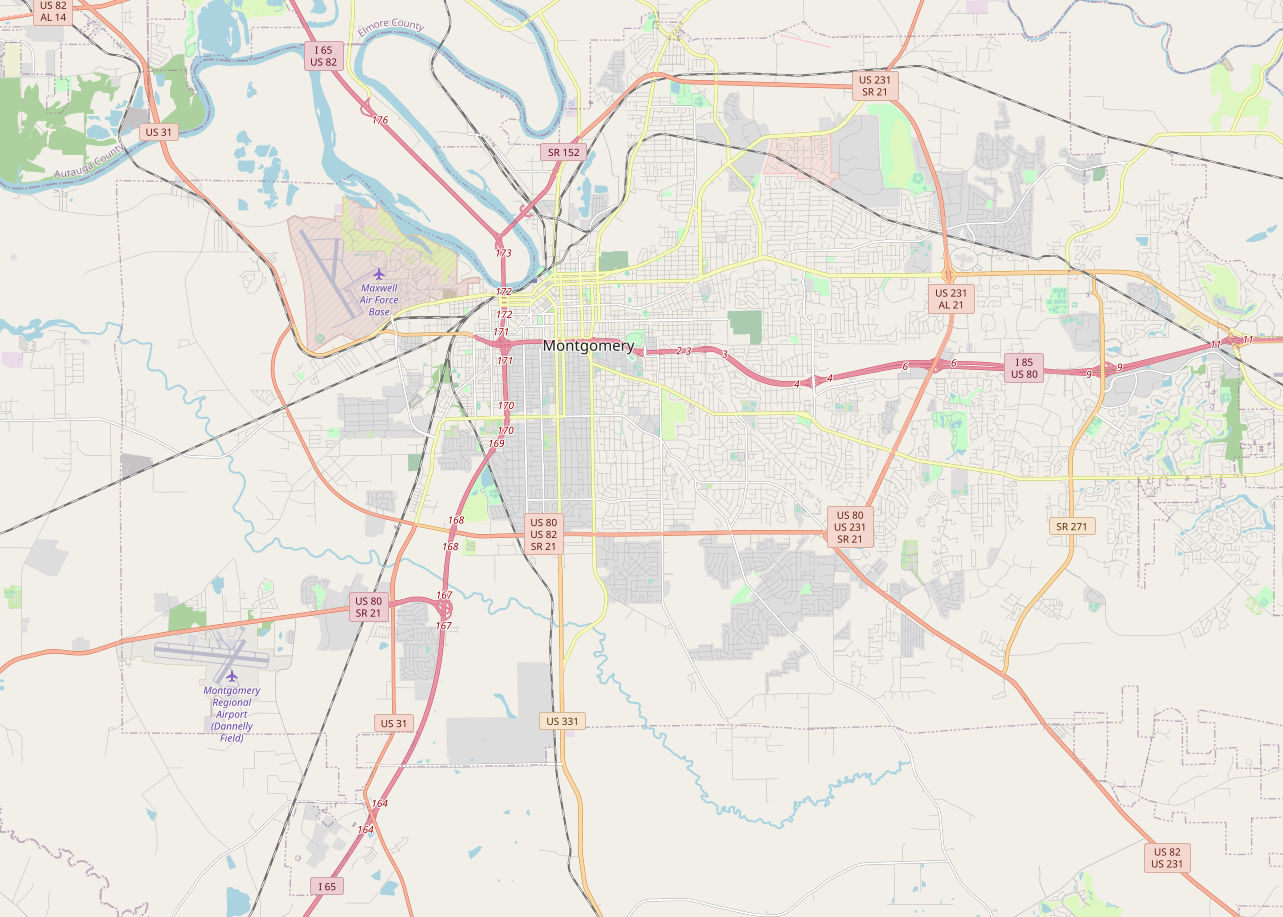
- Location within Montgomery, Alabama Location within Alabama Location within the United States
- Location: 230 Noble Ave., Montgomery, Alabama
- Coordinates: 32°21′46″N 86°18′17″W
- Area: 0.7 acres (0.28 ha)
- Built: 1900
- Architect: Hugger Bros. Construction Co.
- Architectural style: Queen Anne
- Demolished: 2011
- NRHP reference No.: 75000325
- Added to NRHP: March 15, 1975

The Gay House was a historic Queen Anne style house in Montgomery, Alabama. The two-story frame building was built by the Hugger Brothers Construction Company in 1900 for Charles Linn Gay. Gay, born on November 8, 1862, was a Montgomery businessman. He died on July 4, 1928. The house was added to the National Register of Historic Places on March 15, 1975. It was mostly destroyed by fire in October 2007 and the remnants were sold for architectural salvage in July 2011.
