= Wide Awake Grocery Building =

- U.S. National Register of Historic Places
- U.S. Historic district – Contributing property
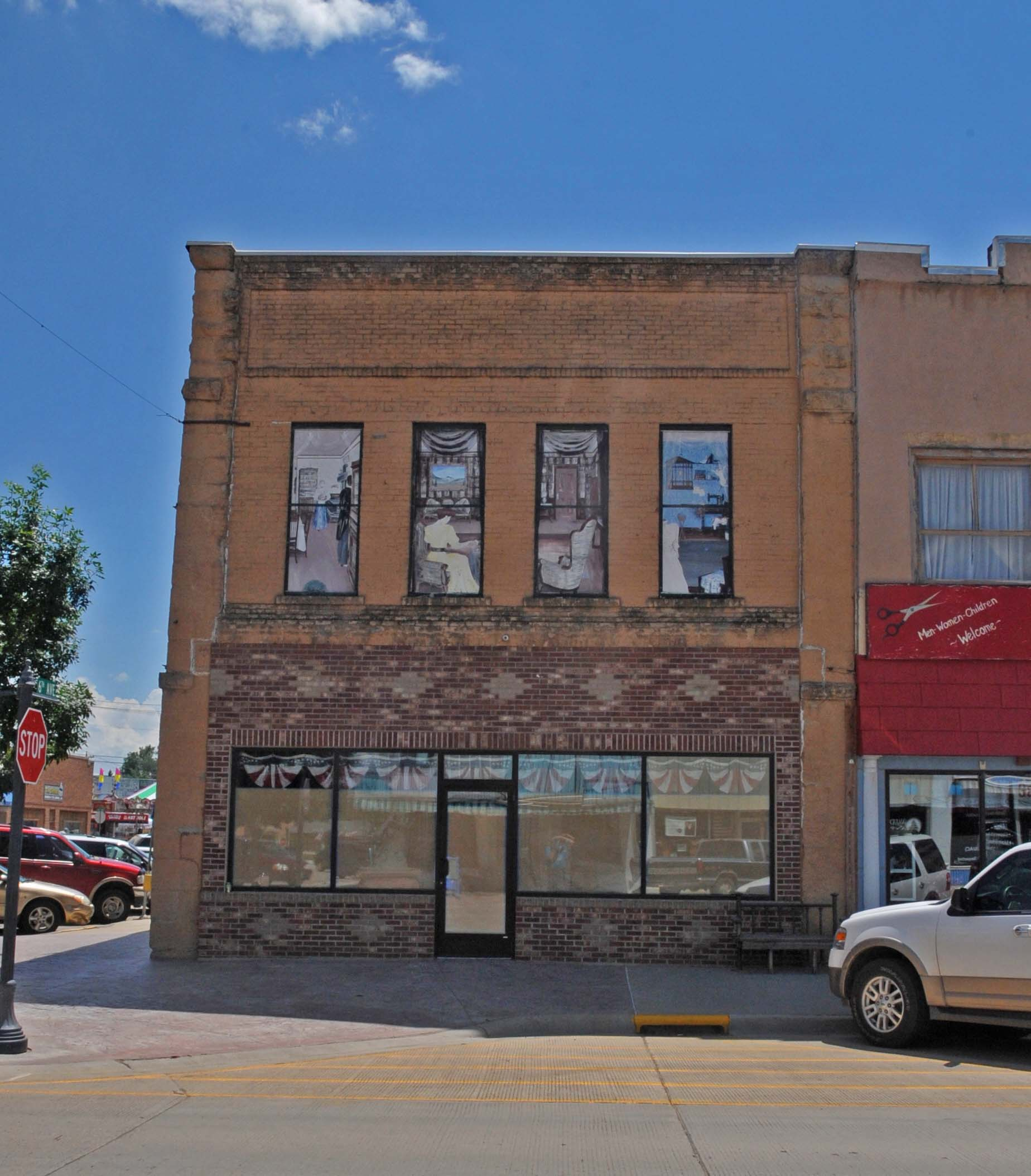

- Location within South Dakota Location within the United States
- Location: 520 State St., Belle Fourche, South Dakota
- Coordinates: 44°40′15″N 103°51′2″W
- Area: 1 acre (0.40 ha)
- Built: 1908, 1911
- Built by: Scotney, John Aaron
- Part of: Belle Fourche Commercial Historic District (ID82003917)
- NRHP reference No.: 78002542

Significant dates
- Added to NRHP: March 30, 1978
- Designated CP: April 27, 1982

The Wide Awake Grocery Building, situated at 520 State St. in Belle Fourche, South Dakota, was completed in 1911. Also known as Sly's Grocery, it was listed on the National Register of Historic Places in 1978.

It was built in 1908 and extended 127 feet in 1911, resulting in size of 197 by 32 feet (60.0 m × 9.8 m).

It was deemed notable as "one of the dwindling number of cut stone commercial buildings left in the state. Its architectural importance is enhanced because it displays both rock faced and dressed sandstone ashlar; sandstone, the later type is not normally found"; and as "an important grocery for Belle Fourche since its construction." It was originally called Wide Awake Grocery, then Pomeroy and Glassie, then Sly's from 1922 on.

Over the years its second floor has contained apartments, a high school, and a theatre and site of Belle Fourche social events.

The Belle Fourche Commercial Historic District, NRHP-listed in 1982, included it as a contributing building.
