= Belle Fourche Commercial Historic District =

- U.S. National Register of Historic Places
- U.S. Historic district
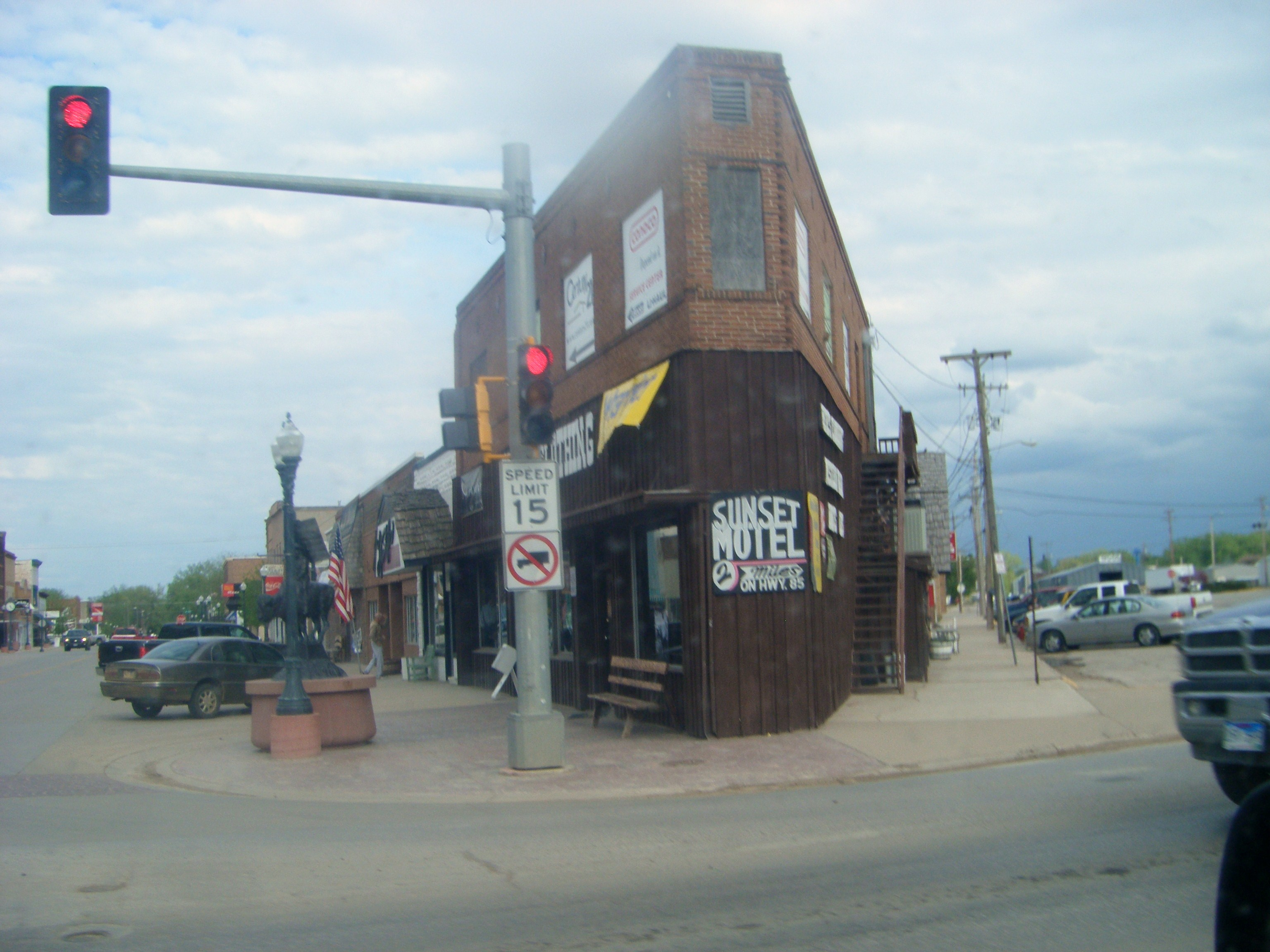
- 500 State Street, also called the flat-iron building, used as post office and store

- Location within South Dakota Location within the United States
- Location: 500-620 State St. (both sides) and 608-622 5th Ave. (even side), Belle Fourche, South Dakota
- Coordinates: 44°40′20″N 103°51′12″W
- Area: 8 acres (3.2 ha)
- Built: 1940
- NRHP reference No.: 82003917
- Added to NRHP: April 27, 1982

The Belle Fourche Commercial Historic District, a 8 acres (3.2 ha) historic district in Belle Fourche, South Dakota, was listed on the National Register of Historic Places in 1982.

It includes 16 contributing buildings. The district includes 500 to 620 State St. (both sides) and the even side from 608 to 622 5th Ave.

Selected included buildings are:

- Hitchin' Post building, 500 State Street (between 1903 and 1915), also known as the flat-iron building. Second story added c. 1923. Used as both post office and store.
- Wide Awake Grocery Building, 520 State St. (1911), separately listed on the National Register in 1978.
- Christianson's, 501 State Street (c.1895)
- Gay Building, 507 State Street (c.1908)
- Townsend Building, 515 State Street (c.1905)
- Thomas Drug, 521 State Street (c.1890). Originally built as Ferrall Hardware Store, a survivor of 1895 fire
- Bolles Block, 603 State Street (1917)
- IOOF Building, 607 State Street (c.1903-1915)
