= Wilbur D. and Hattie Cannon House =

Historic house in Iowa, United States

- U.S. National Register of Historic Places
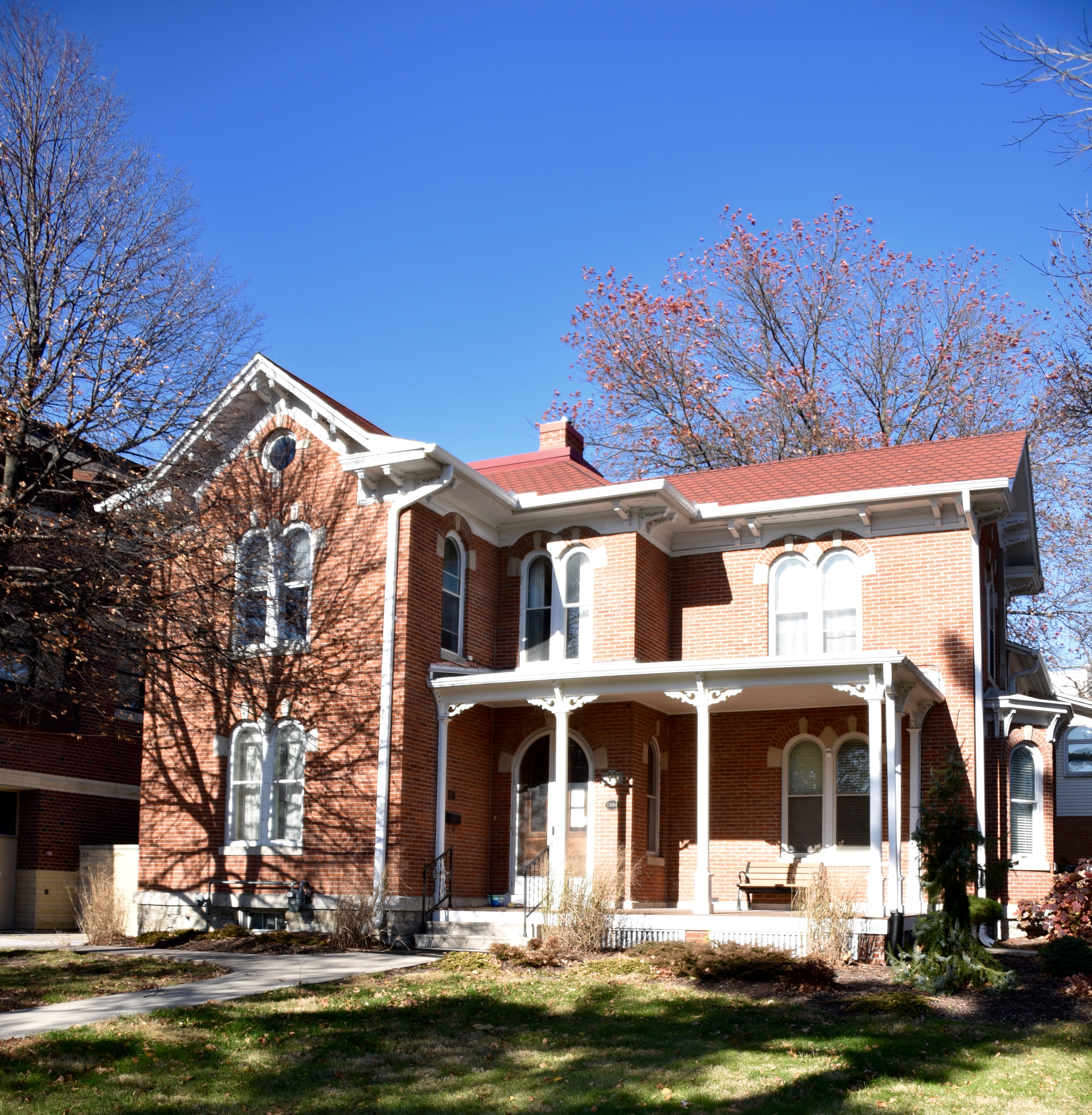

- Location within Iowa Location within the United States
- Location: 320 Melrose Ave. Iowa City, Iowa
- Coordinates: 41°39′25.7″N 91°32′38.8″W
- Area: less than one acre
- Built: 1884
- Architectural style: Italianate
- NRHP reference No.: 94001198
- Added to NRHP: October 7, 1994

The Wilbur D. and Hattie Cannon House (also known as the Cannon-Gay House and the McCloskey House) is a historic house located at 320 Melrose Avenue in Iowa City, Iowa.

== Description and history ==
Wilbur Cannon is a member of one of the early families who settled Johnson County. He had this two-story, brick Italianate house built in 1884 in an area west of the Iowa River known as West Lucas. It was home to farmsteads and country estates that were located within a mile or two of the downtown area. As the city expanded, it absorbed these estates and the houses, such as this one, became city residences. The house follows an asymmetrical plan and includes typical Italianate features such as its window and door treatments, the heavy cornice, and the double brackets under the eaves.

It was listed on the National Register of Historic Places on October 7, 1994.
