= Hoover, South Dakota =

Unincorporated community in South Dakota, U.S.

Coordinates: 45°06′45″N 103°16′02″W

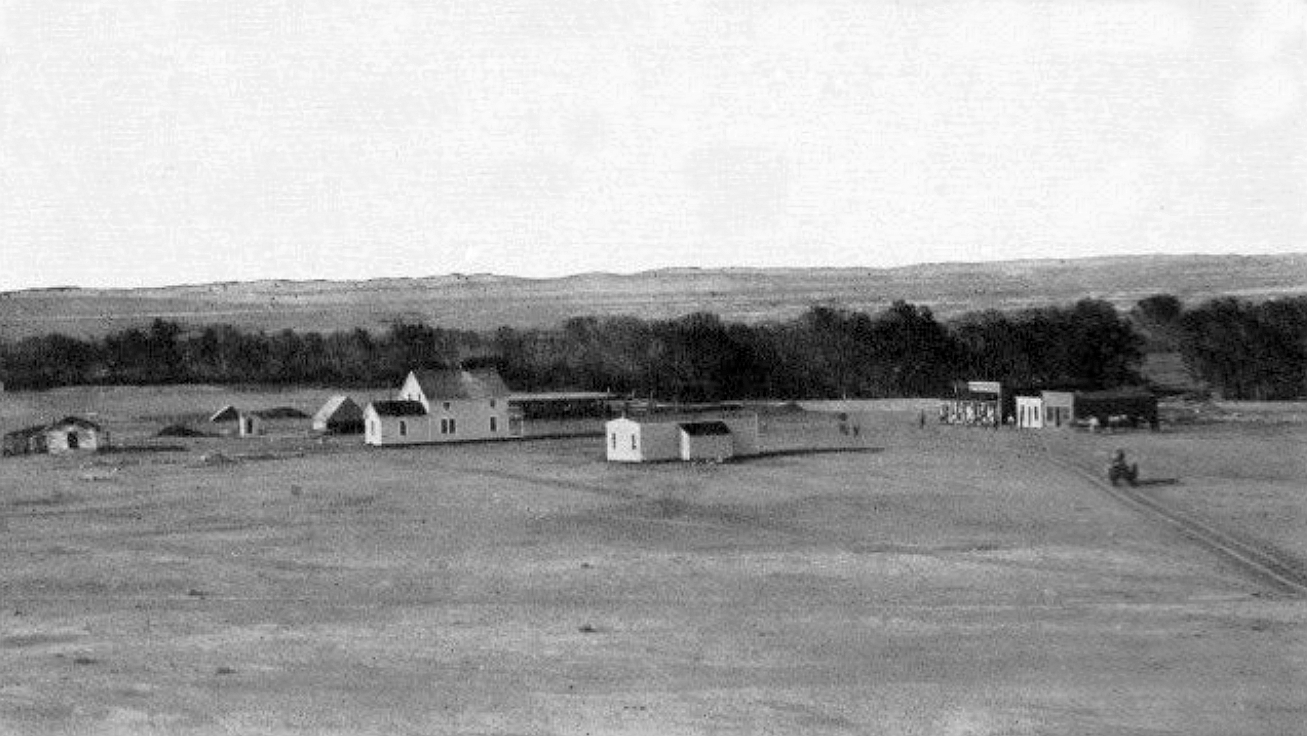
Hoover, 1914

Hoover is an unincorporated community in Butte County, in the U.S. state of South Dakota.

== History ==
Hoover was laid out in 1905, and named in honor of John Hoover, a local cattleman. A post office called Hoover was established in 1905, and remained in operation until 1973. The Hoover general store was built in 1902 and remains in operation as the only business in this rural location.
