= Thomas Haskins Gay House =

Historic house in South Dakota, United States

- U.S. National Register of Historic Places
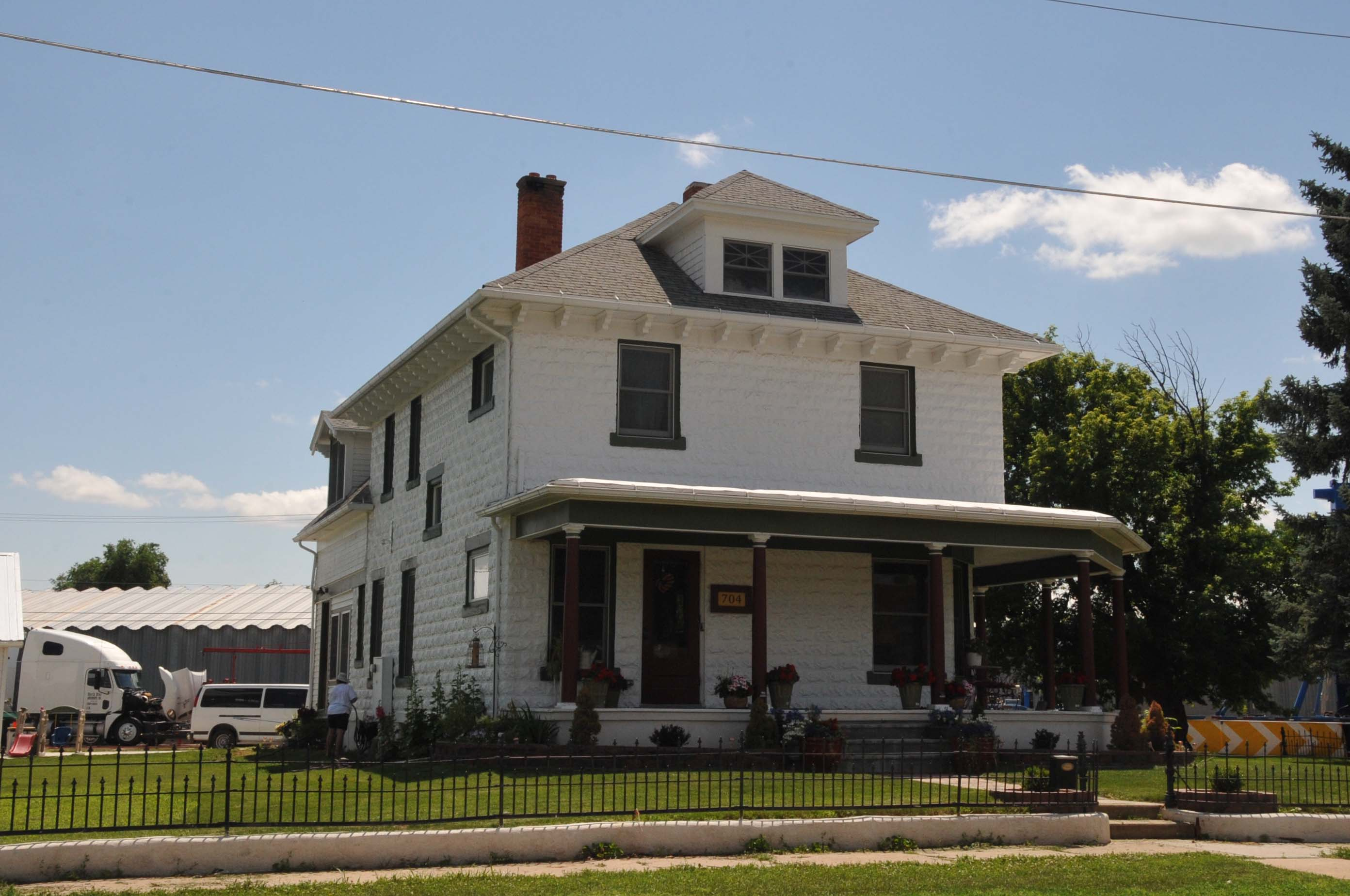

- Location within South Dakota Location within the United States
- Location: 704 Harding, Belle Fourche, South Dakota
- Coordinates: 44°40′13″N 103°51′00″W
- Area: 1 acre (0.40 ha)
- Built: 1914
- NRHP reference No.: 82003919
- Added to NRHP: July 19, 1982

The Thomas Haskins Gay House, at 704 Harding in Belle Fourche, South Dakota, was built in 1914. Also known as the Gay-Frerich House, it was listed on the National Register of Historic Places in 1982.

It is a two-story "cube shape" house, built (with some modification) to a pattern book design from Radford American Homes, specifically Design No. 8361, which appeared in William A. Radford's "Cement Houses and How to Build Them", published c.1900-1910.

The property includes a carriage house.
