= Fruitdale, South Dakota =

- Town
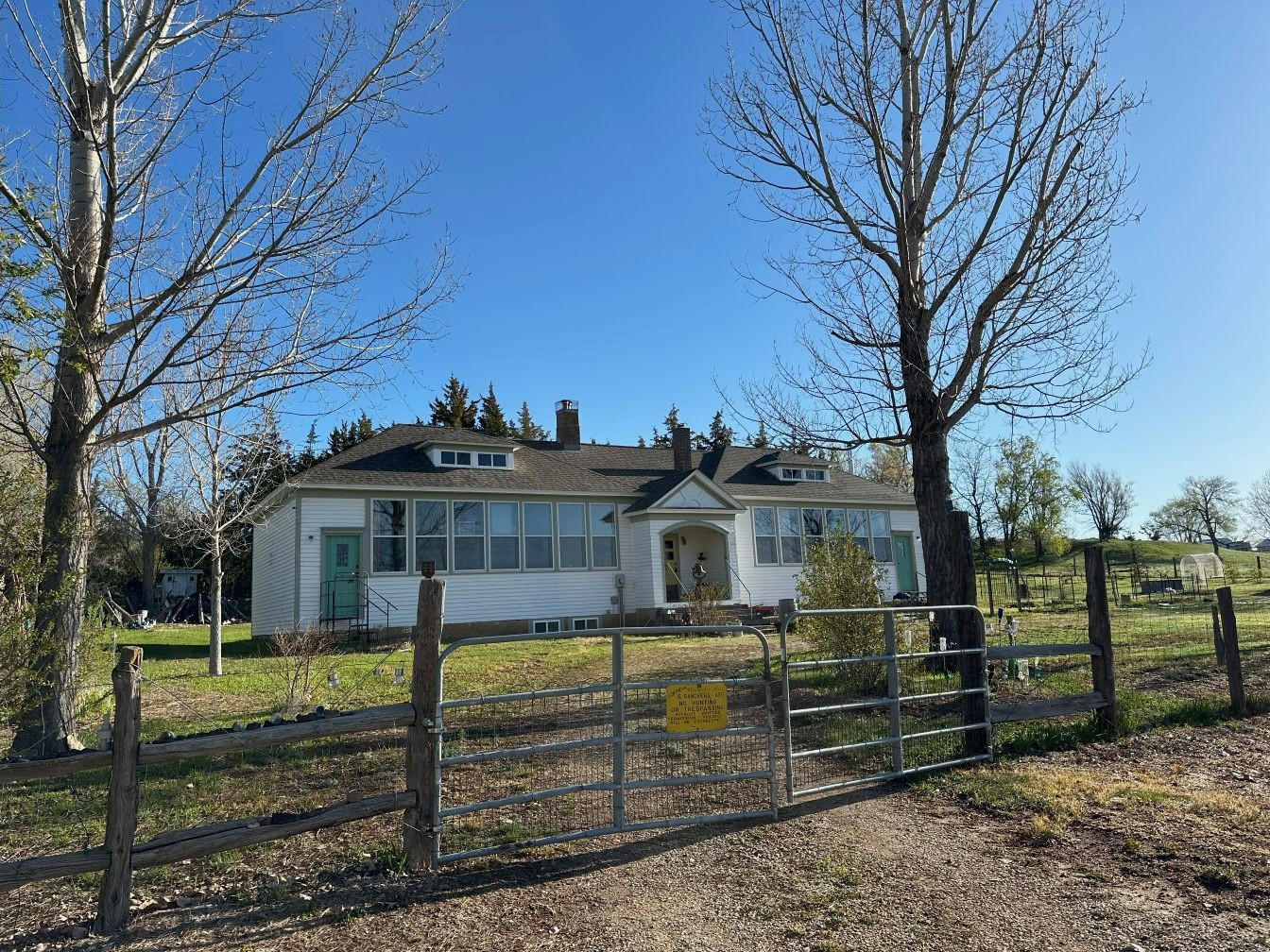
- Fruitdale School

- Location in Butte County and the state of South Dakota
- Coordinates: 44°40′09″N 103°41′44″W
- Country: United States
- State: South Dakota
- County: Butte
- Founded: 1910

Area
  - Total: 0.27 sq mi (0.71 km^{2})
  - Land: 0.27 sq mi (0.71 km^{2})
  - Water: 0 sq mi (0.00 km^{2})
- Elevation: 2,956 ft (901 m)

Population (2020)
  - Total: 73
  - Density: 266.0/sq mi (102.69/km^{2})
- Time zone: UTC-7 (Mountain (MST))
  - Summer (DST): UTC-6 (MDT)
- ZIP code: 57717
- Area code: 605
- FIPS code: 46-23140
- GNIS feature ID: 1267397

Fruitdale is a town in Butte County, South Dakota, United States. The population was 73 at the 2020 census.

Fruitdale was laid out in 1911, and named for a fruit orchard near the original town site.

== Geography ==
According to the United States Census Bureau, the town has a total area of 0.27 square miles (0.70 km^{2}), all land.

== Demographics ==
Historical population
Census	Pop.	Note	%±
1920	40		—
1930	113		182.5%
1940	89		−21.2%
1950	70		−21.3%
1960	79		12.9%
1970	74		−6.3%
1980	88		18.9%
1990	43		−51.1%
2000	62		44.2%
2010	64		3.2%
2020	73		14.1%
U.S. Decennial Census

=== 2010 census ===
As of the census of 2010, there were 64 people, 29 households, and 18 families residing in the town. The population density was 237.0 inhabitants per square mile (91.5/km^{2}). There were 32 housing units at an average density of 118.5 per square mile (45.8/km^{2}). The racial makeup of the town was 98.4% White and 1.6% from two or more races. Hispanic or Latino of any race were 4.7% of the population.

There were 29 households, of which 17.2% had children under the age of 18 living with them, 58.6% were married couples living together, 3.4% had a male householder with no wife present, and 37.9% were non-families. 31.0% of all households were made up of individuals, and 10.3% had someone living alone who was 65 years of age or older. The average household size was 2.21 and the average family size was 2.78.

The median age in the town was 45.8 years. 15.6% of residents were under the age of 18; 7.9% were between the ages of 18 and 24; 21.9% were from 25 to 44; 39% were from 45 to 64; and 15.6% were 65 years of age or older. The gender makeup of the town was 48.4% male and 51.6% female.

=== 2000 census ===
As of the census of 2000, there were 62 people, 23 households, and 18 families residing in the town. The population density was 195.2 inhabitants per square mile (75.4/km^{2}). There were 29 housing units at an average density of 91.3 per square mile (35.3/km^{2}). The racial makeup of the town was 93.55% White, and 6.45% from two or more races.

There were 23 households, out of which 47.8% had children under the age of 18 living with them, 65.2% were married couples living together, 8.7% had a female householder with no husband present, and 21.7% were non-families. 17.4% of all households were made up of individuals, and 4.3% had someone living alone who was 65 years of age or older. The average household size was 2.70 and the average family size was 3.11.

In the town, the population was spread out, with 29.0% under the age of 18, 4.8% from 18 to 24, 33.9% from 25 to 44, 25.8% from 45 to 64, and 6.5% who were 65 years of age or older. The median age was 39 years. For every 100 females, there were 113.8 males. For every 100 females age 18 and over, there were 100.0 males.

The median income for a household in the town was $26,250, and the median income for a family was $28,125. Males had a median income of $33,750 versus $14,500 for females. The per capita income for the town was $10,932. None of the families and about 2.8% of the population were below the poverty line.
