= Nisland, South Dakota =

- Town
- Location in Butte County and the state of South Dakota
- Coordinates: 44°40′23″N 103°33′14″W
- Country: United States
- State: South Dakota
- County: Butte
- Platted: 1909

Area
  - Total: 0.27 sq mi (0.70 km^{2})
  - Land: 0.27 sq mi (0.70 km^{2})
  - Water: 0 sq mi (0.00 km^{2})
- Elevation: 2,854 ft (870 m)

Population (2020)
  - Total: 206
  - Density: 765/sq mi (295.3/km^{2})
- Time zone: UTC-7 (Mountain (MST))
  - Summer (DST): UTC-6 (MDT)
- ZIP code: 57762
- Area code: 605
- FIPS code: 46-45180
- GNIS feature ID: 1267494

Nisland is a town in Butte County, South Dakota, United States. The population was 206 at the 2020 census.

The town was named in honor of Nis Sorensen, the original owner of the town site.

== Geography ==
According to the United States Census Bureau, the town has a total area of 0.27 square miles (0.70 km^{2}), all land.

== Demographics ==
Historical population
Census	Pop.	Note	%±
1920	173		—
1930	187		8.1%
1940	212		13.4%
1950	216		1.9%
1960	211		−2.3%
1970	157		−25.6%
1980	216		37.6%
1990	174		−19.4%
2000	204		17.2%
2010	232		13.7%
2020	206		−11.2%
U.S. Decennial Census

=== 2010 census ===
As of the census of 2010, there were 232 people, 94 households, and 62 families residing in the town. The population density was 859.3 inhabitants per square mile (331.8/km^{2}). There were 114 housing units at an average density of 422.2 per square mile (163.0/km^{2}). The racial makeup of the town was 96.1% White, 0.9% African American, 0.4% Native American, and 2.6% from two or more races. Hispanic or Latino of any race were 3.0% of the population.

There were 94 households, of which 28.7% had children under the age of 18 living with them, 44.7% were married couples living together, 12.8% had a female householder with no husband present, 8.5% had a male householder with no wife present, and 34.0% were non-families. 26.6% of all households were made up of individuals, and 9.6% had someone living alone who was 65 years of age or older. The average household size was 2.47 and the average family size was 3.00.

The median age in the town was 43.3 years. 24.6% of residents were under the age of 18; 9% were between the ages of 18 and 24; 18.5% were from 25 to 44; 30.5% were from 45 to 64; and 17.2% were 65 years of age or older. The gender makeup of the town was 54.7% male and 45.3% female.

=== 2000 census ===
As of the census of 2000, there were 204 people, 80 households, and 58 families residing in the town. The population density was 800.7 inhabitants per square mile (309.2/km^{2}). There were 100 housing units at an average density of 392.5 per square mile (151.5/km^{2}). The racial makeup of the town was 82.84% White, 9.80% Native American, 5.88% from other races, and 1.47% from two or more races. Hispanic or Latino of any race were 6.86% of the population.

There were 80 households, out of which 37.5% had children under the age of 18 living with them, 45.0% were married couples living together, 15.0% had a female householder with no husband present, and 27.5% were non-families. 27.5% of all households were made up of individuals, and 11.3% had someone living alone who was 65 years of age or older. The average household size was 2.55 and the average family size was 2.93.

In the town, the population was spread out, with 29.9% under the age of 18, 8.8% from 18 to 24, 21.6% from 25 to 44, 22.1% from 45 to 64, and 17.6% who were 65 years of age or older. The median age was 38 years. For every 100 females, there were 100.0 males. For every 100 women age 18 and over, there were 116.7 men.

The median income for a household in the town was $19,063, and the median income for a family was $19,844. Males had a median income of $19,886 versus $13,958 for females. The per capita income for the town was $10,017. About 28.6% of families and 26.9% of the population were below the poverty line, including 50.0% of those under the age of eighteen and none of those 65 or over.

== See also ==
- List of towns in South Dakota
