= Vale, South Dakota =

- CDP
- Location of Vale in South Dakota Vale (the United States)
- Coordinates: 44°37′15″N 103°23′55″W
- Country: United States
- State: South Dakota
- County: Butte

Area
  - Total: 1.49 sq mi (3.86 km^{2})
  - Land: 1.49 sq mi (3.86 km^{2})
  - Water: 0 sq mi (0.00 km^{2})
- Elevation: 2,772 ft (845 m)

Population (2020)
  - Total: 130
  - Density: 87.3/sq mi (33.71/km^{2})
- Time zone: UTC-7 (Mountain (MST))
  - Summer (DST): UTC-6 (MDT)
- ZIP code: 57788
- Area code: 605
- FIPS code: 46-65940
- GNIS feature ID: 2628852

Vale is a census-designated place (CDP) in Butte County, South Dakota, United States. According to the 2020 census, the population was 130. Vale has been assigned the ZIP code of 57788. The public school located in Vale, whose mascot was The Beet Diggers, closed in 1982.

Vale was so-named because the town site is located in a valley.

The Full Throttle Saloon, a large bar and entertainment site described as the world's largest biker bar and previously the subject of the reality television series Full Throttle Saloon, was rebuilt, moving from nearby Sturgis to 600 acres in Vale near Bear Butte.
