= Butte County, South Dakota =

County in South Dakota, United States

- County
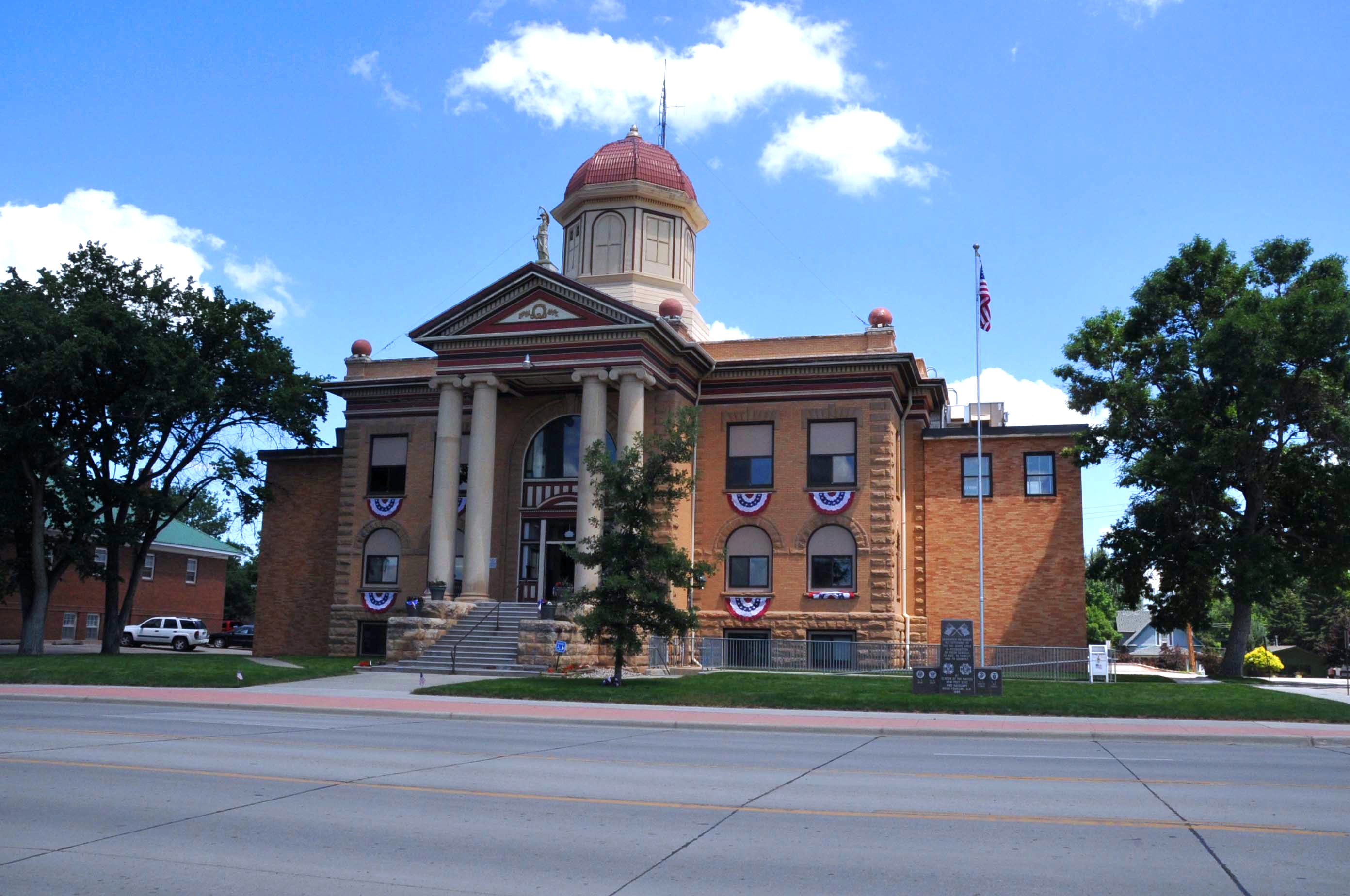
- Butte County Courthouse

- Location within the U.S. state of South Dakota
- Coordinates: 44°55′N 103°29′W
- Country: United States
- State: South Dakota
- Founded: March 2, 1883; May 6, 1883
- Named for: Hills in the county
- Seat: Belle Fourche
- Largest city: Belle Fourche

Area
  - Total: 2,266 sq mi (5,870 km^{2})
  - Land: 2,250 sq mi (5,800 km^{2})
  - Water: 16 sq mi (41 km^{2}) 0.7%

Population (2020)
  - Total: 10,243
  - Estimate (2025): 10,856 ▲
  - Density: 4.55/sq mi (1.76/km^{2})
- Time zone: UTC−7 (Mountain)
  - Summer (DST): UTC−6 (MDT)
- Congressional district: At-large
- Website: www.buttesd.gov

Butte County is a county in the U.S. state of South Dakota. As of the 2020 census, the population was 10,243. Its county seat is Belle Fourche. The county was established in the Dakota Territory on March 2, 1883, and given the descriptive name based on the French word for a hill.

== History ==
=== Prehistory ===
In 1975, plesiosaur fossils dating to the Cretaceous Period (ca. 110 million years ago) were discovered in Butte County. In the 1980s, a 90-million-year-old fossil of a clawless lobster was discovered. A Tyrannosaurus rex skeleton was found in 1981.

The early human history of the Belle Fourche River Valley has been traced to about 3000 BC. The first people of the area were Native Americans who resided on the northwestern plains of North America. The earliest known evidence of human activity in the area dates to the Middle Plains Archaic Period of the Plains Indians (ca. 3000–1500 BC). Traces of tipi rings dating from this period have been found. In 1979 and 1980, archeologists excavated a fortified and previously inhabited site west of Belle Fourche that dated to AD 1000. This site was called the Smiley-Evans Site and had been recorded in 1959. Until 1984, only 47 archaeological sites had been recorded, but after the excavation of the Smiley-Evans Site, several investigations were undertaken. As of 1989, 199 archaeological sites had been discovered in the county.

== Geography ==
Butte County lies on the west edge of South Dakota. Its northwestern boundary line abuts the eastern boundary line of the state of Montana, and its southwestern boundary line abuts the eastern boundary line of the state of Wyoming. The Butte County terrain consists of semi-arid rolling hills cut by drainages oriented NW-SE. A relatively small portion of the area is dedicated to agriculture, including the employment of center pivot irrigation. The terrain slopes to the southeast, and its highest point is on the western boundary line near the SW corner: 3,865 ft (1,178 m) ASL.

The county has a total area of 2,266 square miles (5,870 km^{2}), of which 2,250 square miles (5,800 km^{2}) is land and 16 square miles (41 km^{2}) (0.7%) is water.

=== Major highways ===
- U.S. Highway 85
- U.S. Highway 212
- South Dakota Highway 34
- South Dakota Highway 79
- South Dakota Highway 168

=== Adjacent counties ===
- Harding County – north
- Perkins County – northeast
- Meade County – southeast
- Lawrence County – southwest
- Crook County, Wyoming – west
- Carter County, Montana – northwest

=== Protected areas ===
- Belle Fourche Dam State Game Production Area
- Belle Fourche National Wildlife Refuge
- Newell Lake State Game Production Area
- Newell Lake State Lakeside Use Area
- Rocky Point State Recreation Area

== Demographics ==
Historical population
Census	Pop.	Note	%±
1890	1,037		—
1900	2,907		180.3%
1910	4,993		71.8%
1920	6,819		36.6%
1930	8,589		26.0%
1940	8,004		−6.8%
1950	8,161		2.0%
1960	8,592		5.3%
1970	7,825		−8.9%
1980	8,372		7.0%
1990	7,914		−5.5%
2000	9,094		14.9%
2010	10,110		11.2%
2020	10,243		1.3%
2025 (est.)	10,856	▲	6.0%
U.S. Decennial Census; 1790–1960 1900–1990; 1990–2000 2010–2020

=== 2020 census ===
As of the 2020 census, the county had a population of 10,243, 4,196 households, and 2,760 families; the population density was 4.6 inhabitants per square mile (1.8/km^{2}).

Of the residents, 24.2% were under the age of 18 and 21.2% were 65 years of age or older; the median age was 41.3 years. For every 100 females there were 101.0 males, and for every 100 females age 18 and over there were 100.1 males.

The racial makeup of the county was 91.0% White, 0.1% Black or African American, 2.0% American Indian and Alaska Native, 0.3% Asian, 1.2% from some other race, and 5.4% from two or more races. Hispanic or Latino residents of any race comprised 4.0% of the population.

There were 4,196 households in the county, of which 28.1% had children under the age of 18 living with them and 22.6% had a female householder with no spouse or partner present. About 29.2% of all households were made up of individuals and 13.1% had someone living alone who was 65 years of age or older.

There were 4,673 housing units, of which 10.2% were vacant. Among occupied housing units, 73.4% were owner-occupied and 26.6% were renter-occupied. The homeowner vacancy rate was 1.6% and the rental vacancy rate was 9.9%.

=== 2010 census ===
As of the 2010 census, there were 10,110 people, 4,160 households, and 2,786 families in the county. The population density was 4.5 inhabitants per square mile (1.7/km^{2}). There were 4,621 housing units at an average density of 2.1 units per square mile (0.81 units/km^{2}). The racial makeup of the county was 94.2% white, 1.9% American Indian, 0.2% black or African American, 0.2% Asian, 0.1% Pacific islander, 0.8% from other races, and 2.6% from two or more races. Those of Hispanic or Latino origin made up 3.0% of the population. In terms of ancestry, 40.9% were German, 16.6% were Irish, 15.7% were Norwegian, 10.4% were English, and 5.2% were American.

Of the 4,160 households, 30.5% had children under the age of 18 living with them, 52.3% were married couples living together, 9.8% had a female householder with no husband present, 33.0% were non-families, and 28.5% of all households were made up of individuals. The average household size was 2.40 and the average family size was 2.92. The median age was 41.1 years.

The median income for a household in the county was $39,041 and the median income for a family was $52,829. Males had a median income of $37,429 versus $25,273 for females. The per capita income for the county was $20,418. About 11.5% of families and 15.6% of the population were below the poverty line, including 25.0% of those under age 18 and 8.9% of those age 65 or over.

== Communities ==
=== Cities ===
- Belle Fourche (county seat)
- Newell

=== Towns ===
- Fruitdale
- Nisland

=== Census-designated place ===
- Vale

=== Unincorporated communities ===
- Arpan
- Castle Rock
- East Butte
- Hoover
- Minnesela
- West Butte

=== Townships ===
- Union
- Vale

== Politics ==
Like most of South Dakota, Butte County is a Republican stronghold. No Democratic presidential candidate has carried Butte County since Franklin D. Roosevelt in 1932. Although Roosevelt in the following election and Lyndon Johnson in 1964, respectively, came within six and fourteen votes of claiming the county during landslide Democratic victories, apart from these instances, no Democratic presidential candidate since 1920 has reached forty percent of the county's vote.

United States presidential election results for Butte County, South Dakota
Year	Republican		Democratic		Third party(ies)	
Year	No.	%	No.	%	No.	%
1892	154	40.10%	28	7.29%	202	52.60%
1896	222	43.53%	286	56.08%	2	0.39%
1900	492	53.19%	420	45.41%	13	1.41%
1904	793	67.32%	330	28.01%	55	4.67%
1908	1,636	60.21%	915	33.68%	166	6.11%
1912	0	0.00%	601	41.08%	862	58.92%
1916	537	33.31%	930	57.69%	145	9.00%
1920	1,722	54.51%	672	21.27%	765	24.22%
1924	1,199	55.59%	277	12.84%	681	31.57%
1928	1,988	69.36%	840	29.31%	38	1.33%
1932	1,594	47.77%	1,684	50.46%	59	1.77%
1936	1,525	48.49%	1,519	48.30%	101	3.21%
1940	2,164	60.99%	1,384	39.01%	0	0.00%
1944	1,824	66.28%	928	33.72%	0	0.00%
1948	1,726	60.73%	1,065	37.47%	51	1.79%
1952	2,689	76.26%	837	23.74%	0	0.00%
1956	2,231	68.46%	1,028	31.54%	0	0.00%
1960	2,496	65.44%	1,318	34.56%	0	0.00%
1964	1,877	50.19%	1,863	49.81%	0	0.00%
1968	2,090	63.28%	1,017	30.79%	196	5.93%
1972	2,452	68.82%	1,085	30.45%	26	0.73%
1976	2,055	59.19%	1,366	39.34%	51	1.47%
1980	2,850	73.11%	843	21.63%	205	5.26%
1984	2,865	78.13%	784	21.38%	18	0.49%
1988	2,291	63.96%	1,256	35.06%	35	0.98%
1992	1,674	45.24%	973	26.30%	1,053	28.46%
1996	1,947	53.24%	1,132	30.95%	578	15.81%
2000	2,760	74.82%	840	22.77%	89	2.41%
2004	3,166	74.13%	1,009	23.62%	96	2.25%
2008	2,821	66.28%	1,306	30.69%	129	3.03%
2012	3,073	73.03%	1,002	23.81%	133	3.16%
2016	3,357	77.15%	696	16.00%	298	6.85%
2020	3,731	77.70%	939	19.55%	132	2.75%
2024	4,024	79.18%	942	18.54%	116	2.28%

== See also ==
- National Register of Historic Places listings in Butte County, South Dakota
