= Newell, South Dakota =

- City
- Seal

- Location in Butte County and the state of South Dakota
- Coordinates: 44°43′03″N 103°25′06″W
- Country: United States
- State: South Dakota
- County: Butte
- Incorporated: 1911

Area
  - Total: 1.01 sq mi (2.62 km^{2})
  - Land: 1.01 sq mi (2.62 km^{2})
  - Water: 0 sq mi (0.00 km^{2})
- Elevation: 2,822 ft (860 m)

Population (2020)
  - Total: 584
  - Density: 577.0/sq mi (222.77/km^{2})
- Time zone: UTC-7 (Mountain (MST))
  - Summer (DST): UTC-6 (MDT)
- ZIP code: 57760
- Area code: 605
- FIPS code: 46-44860
- GNIS feature ID: 1267491
- Website: www.townofnewell.org

Newell is a city in Butte County, South Dakota, United States. The population was 584 at the 2020 census.

Newell was laid out in 1910. The city has the name of F. H. Newell, director of the United States Reclamation Service.

== Geography ==
According to the United States Census Bureau, the city has a total area of 1.01 square miles (2.62 km^{2}), all land.

=== Climate ===
Climate data for Newell, South Dakota (1991–2020 normals, extremes 1920–present)
Month	Jan	Feb	Mar	Apr	May	Jun	Jul	Aug	Sep	Oct	Nov	Dec	Year
Record high °F (°C)	72 (22)	75 (24)	83 (28)	92 (33)	100 (38)	109 (43)	110 (43)	108 (42)	106 (41)	95 (35)	81 (27)	74 (23)	110 (43)
Mean maximum °F (°C)	55.2 (12.9)	57.6 (14.2)	72.3 (22.4)	80.6 (27.0)	86.3 (30.2)	94.1 (34.5)	99.5 (37.5)	99.5 (37.5)	95.4 (35.2)	84.5 (29.2)	69.8 (21.0)	57.2 (14.0)	101.7 (38.7)
Mean daily maximum °F (°C)	31.8 (−0.1)	35.1 (1.7)	45.5 (7.5)	56.1 (13.4)	65.9 (18.8)	76.9 (24.9)	85.8 (29.9)	85.1 (29.5)	75.4 (24.1)	59.9 (15.5)	45.1 (7.3)	34.2 (1.2)	58.1 (14.5)
Daily mean °F (°C)	20.8 (−6.2)	23.8 (−4.6)	33.6 (0.9)	43.8 (6.6)	54.3 (12.4)	64.9 (18.3)	72.5 (22.5)	70.9 (21.6)	60.9 (16.1)	46.6 (8.1)	33.0 (0.6)	23.0 (−5.0)	45.7 (7.6)
Mean daily minimum °F (°C)	9.8 (−12.3)	12.6 (−10.8)	21.7 (−5.7)	31.5 (−0.3)	42.6 (5.9)	52.8 (11.6)	59.2 (15.1)	56.7 (13.7)	46.5 (8.1)	33.4 (0.8)	20.9 (−6.2)	11.9 (−11.2)	33.3 (0.7)
Mean minimum °F (°C)	−13.8 (−25.4)	−9.6 (−23.1)	0.5 (−17.5)	15.3 (−9.3)	28.3 (−2.1)	41.4 (5.2)	49.3 (9.6)	45.3 (7.4)	32.3 (0.2)	15.8 (−9.0)	0.9 (−17.3)	−10.3 (−23.5)	−20.9 (−29.4)
Record low °F (°C)	−38 (−39)	−36 (−38)	−26 (−32)	−11 (−24)	12 (−11)	32 (0)	36 (2)	36 (2)	9 (−13)	−10 (−23)	−24 (−31)	−38 (−39)	−38 (−39)
Average precipitation inches (mm)	0.36 (9.1)	0.50 (13)	0.82 (21)	1.81 (46)	3.16 (80)	3.32 (84)	2.07 (53)	1.30 (33)	0.99 (25)	1.38 (35)	0.53 (13)	0.41 (10)	16.65 (423)
Average snowfall inches (cm)	4.7 (12)	5.1 (13)	7.2 (18)	6.5 (17)	1.1 (2.8)	0.0 (0.0)	0.0 (0.0)	0.0 (0.0)	0.0 (0.0)	2.8 (7.1)	4.2 (11)	8.2 (21)	39.8 (101)
Average precipitation days (≥ 0.01 in)	3.6	3.9	4.5	7.3	9.3	9.4	7.6	5.6	4.1	4.5	3.3	3.6	66.7
Average snowy days (≥ 0.1 in)	2.9	2.8	2.5	1.6	0.3	0.0	0.0	0.0	0.0	0.7	1.7	2.9	15.4
Source: NOAA

== Demographics ==
Historical population
Census	Pop.	Note	%±
1920	414		—
1930	547		32.1%
1940	683		24.9%
1950	784		14.8%
1960	797		1.7%
1970	664		−16.7%
1980	638		−3.9%
1990	675		5.8%
2000	646		−4.3%
2010	603		−6.7%
2020	584		−3.2%
U.S. Decennial Census

=== 2020 census ===
As of the 2020 census, Newell had a population of 584. The median age was 44.0 years. 24.1% of residents were under the age of 18 and 24.8% of residents were 65 years of age or older. For every 100 females there were 95.3 males, and for every 100 females age 18 and over there were 97.8 males age 18 and over.

0.0% of residents lived in urban areas, while 100.0% lived in rural areas.

There were 251 households in Newell, of which 31.1% had children under the age of 18 living in them. Of all households, 46.2% were married-couple households, 21.9% were households with a male householder and no spouse or partner present, and 27.9% were households with a female householder and no spouse or partner present. About 30.6% of all households were made up of individuals and 16.4% had someone living alone who was 65 years of age or older.

There were 307 housing units, of which 18.2% were vacant. The homeowner vacancy rate was 2.3% and the rental vacancy rate was 7.4%.

Racial composition as of the 2020 census
Race	Number	Percent
White	529	90.6%
Black or African American	0	0.0%
American Indian and Alaska Native	12	2.1%
Asian	1	0.2%
Native Hawaiian and Other Pacific Islander	1	0.2%
Some other race	12	2.1%
Two or more races	29	5.0%
Hispanic or Latino (of any race)	10	1.7%

=== 2010 census ===
As of the census of 2010, there were 603 people, 270 households, and 172 families living in the city. The population density was 597.0 inhabitants per square mile (230.5/km^{2}). There were 344 housing units at an average density of 340.6 per square mile (131.5/km^{2}). The racial makeup of the city was 92.7% White, 0.2% African American, 1.7% Native American, 0.3% Asian, 0.5% Pacific Islander, and 4.6% from two or more races. Hispanic or Latino of any race were 1.0% of the population.

There were 270 households, of which 24.1% had children under the age of 18 living with them, 47.8% were married couples living together, 11.1% had a female householder with no husband present, 4.8% had a male householder with no wife present, and 36.3% were non-families. 33.0% of all households were made up of individuals, and 15.6% had someone living alone who was 65 years of age or older. The average household size was 2.23 and the average family size was 2.78.

The median age in the city was 48.2 years. 23.9% of residents were under the age of 18; 4% were between the ages of 18 and 24; 19.3% were from 25 to 44; 30.5% were from 45 to 64; and 22.2% were 65 years of age or older. The gender makeup of the city was 51.1% male and 48.9% female.

=== 2000 census ===
As of the census of 2000, there were 646 people, 274 households, and 178 families living in the city. The population density was 646.9 inhabitants per square mile (249.8/km^{2}). There were 337 housing units at an average density of 337.5 per square mile (130.3/km^{2}). The racial makeup of the city was 97.37% White, 1.55% Native American, 0.15% Asian, and 0.93% from two or more races.

There were 274 households, out of which 28.8% had children under the age of 18 living with them, 52.9% were married couples living together, 9.5% had a female householder with no husband present, and 34.7% were non-families. 33.2% of all households were made up of individuals, and 20.1% had someone living alone who was 65 years of age or older. The average household size was 2.36 and the average family size was 2.99.

In the city, the population was spread out, with 26.9% under the age of 18, 5.7% from 18 to 24, 22.4% from 25 to 44, 26.2% from 45 to 64, and 18.7% who were 65 years of age or older. The median age was 40 years. For every 100 females, there were 86.7 males. For every 100 females age 18 and over, there were 82.9 males.

The median income for a household in the city was $24,000, and the median income for a family was $27,159. Males had a median income of $25,000 versus $16,375 for females. The per capita income for the city was $12,854. About 11.4% of families and 13.7% of the population were below the poverty line, including 16.0% of those under age 18 and 28.1% of those age 65 or over.

== See also ==
- List of cities in South Dakota
