= 2017 American League Wild Card Game =

Play-in game during Major League Baseball's (MLB) 2017 postseason

	1	2	3	4	5	6	7	8	9	R	H	E
Minnesota Twins	3	0	1	0	0	0	0	0	0	4	9	1
New York Yankees	3	1	1	2	0	0	1	0	x	8	9	0
- Date: October 3, 2017
- Venue: Yankee Stadium
- City: The Bronx, New York
- Managers: Paul Molitor (Minnesota Twins); Joe Girardi (New York Yankees)
- Umpires: HP: Alfonso Márquez; 1B: Mike Winters (crew chief); 2B: Eric Cooper; 3B: Lance Barksdale; LF: Tripp Gibson; RF: John Tumpane
- Attendance: 49,280
- Ceremonial first pitch: Chasen Shreve (Note: The game took place two days after the 2017 Las Vegas shooting; Shreve, a native of Las Vegas, was selected to throw the ceremonial first pitch.)
- Television: ESPN
- TV announcers: Dan Shulman, Jessica Mendoza, Aaron Boone, and Buster Olney
- Radio: ESPN
- Radio announcers: Jon Sciambi and Chris Singleton

The 2017 American League Wild Card Game was a play-in game during Major League Baseball's (MLB) 2017 postseason that was played between the American League's (AL) two wild card teams, the New York Yankees and the Minnesota Twins. The game was televised nationally by ESPN. The game took place on October 3 at Yankee Stadium, with the Yankees winning 8–4, thus eliminating the Twins from the postseason and advancing the Yankees to the AL Division Series (ALDS), in which they defeated the Cleveland Indians, 3–2.

== Background ==
This was Minnesota's first playoff appearance as a Wild Card team, and their first postseason appearance since the 2010 American League Division Series. This was also their first appearance after enduring a 59-103 record the year prior, the worst record since moving to Minnesota. After clinching their spot, the Twins named Ervin Santana as their starting pitcher. Miguel Sanó was left off of the roster because of his injured left shin. The Twins had an 85–77 record and finished in second place in the AL Central, 17 games behind the Indians.

This was New York's sixth playoff appearance as a Wild Card team, and their first postseason appearance since the 2015 American League Wild Card Game. Luis Severino started for the Yankees. With a 91–71 record, the Yankees finished in second place in the AL East, two games behind the division-winning Red Sox.

This was the fifth postseason meeting between the two clubs, with the Yankees winning all four previous series. Their most recent meeting was in the 2010 American League Division Series in which the Yankees swept the Twins in three games. This loss also extended the Twins' postseason losing streak to 13 games; ten of those games were against the Yankees.

== Game results ==
=== Line score ===
October 3, 2017 8:10 pm (EDT) at Yankee Stadium in Bronx, New York, 62 °F (17 °C), clear
Team	1	2	3	4	5	6	7	8	9	R	H	E
Minnesota	3	0	1	0	0	0	0	0	0	4	9	1
New York	3	1	1	2	0	0	1	0	X	8	9	0
WP: David Robertson (1–0) LP: José Berríos (0–1); Home runs: MIN: Brian Dozier (1), Eddie Rosario (1); NYY: Didi Gregorius (1), Brett Gardner (1), Aaron Judge (1); Attendance: 49,280; Boxscore

The Twins did not waste any time getting to Severino, with Brian Dozier hitting a leadoff home run. This was followed by a walk to Jorge Polanco and another home run, this one by Eddie Rosario, to put the Twins quickly up 3–0. After allowing a single by Eduardo Escobar and a double by Max Kepler, Severino was relieved after only recording one out, marking the shortest appearance by a Yankees starting pitcher in postseason history. Chad Green relieved Severino and recorded consecutive strikeouts to end the inning. The Yankees quickly responded, however, tying the game in the bottom of the first inning on a three-run home run by Didi Gregorius as Twins starter Ervin Santana also struggled, throwing 41 pitches in the inning. Brett Gardner's home run in the next inning gave the Yankees the lead. In the top of the third, after loading the bases with one out, Green was replaced by David Robertson. Robertson induced a potential double-play ground ball from Byron Buxton, but the Yankees weren't able to get the speedy Buxton out at first, allowing the Twins to tie the game at 4.

José Berríos relieved Santana (who had thrown 64 pitches in the first two innings) to start the bottom of the third, and the Yankees quickly pounced on the right-hander. Gary Sánchez doubled to lead off the inning and later scored on an RBI single by Greg Bird to give the Yankees the lead. In the bottom of the fourth, rookie sensation Aaron Judge hit a two-run home run to extend the Yankee lead to 7–4. Tommy Kahnle relieved Robertson, who had thrown a career-high 3 1/3 innings, all scoreless, to finish the sixth inning and threw 2 1/3 shutout innings of his own. In the bottom of the seventh, a two-out bases-loaded walk to Aaron Hicks further extended the Yankees' lead to 8–4. Closer Aroldis Chapman pitched the ninth inning in a non-save situation for the Yankees to end the game and advance the Yankees to the ALDS.
