= 2017 American League Division Series =

Teams
Team (Wins)		Manager	Season
New York Yankees (3)		Joe Girardi	91–71 (.562), GB: 2
Cleveland Indians (2)		Terry Francona	102–60 (.630), GA: 17
- Dates: October 5–11
- Television: FS1 (Games 1, 3–5); MLB Network (Game 2)
- TV announcers: Matt Vasgersian, John Smoltz, Ken Rosenthal (Games 1, 3–5), and Tom Verducci
- Radio: ESPN
- Radio announcers: Jon Sciambi and Chris Singleton
- Umpires: Vic Carapazza, Dana DeMuth (crew chief), Dan Iassogna, Adrian Johnson, Jeff Nelson, Brian O'Nora

Teams
Team (Wins)		Manager	Season
Houston Astros (3)		A. J. Hinch	101–61 (.623), GA: 21
Boston Red Sox (1)		John Farrell	93–69 (.574), GA: 2
- Dates: October 5–9
- Television: MLB Network (Game 1); FS1 (Games 2–4)
- TV announcers: Bob Costas, Jim Kaat, and J. P. Morosi (MLBN); Joe Davis, David Cone, A. J. Pierzynski, and J. P. Morosi (FS1)
- Radio: ESPN
- Radio announcers: Chris Berman and Rick Sutcliffe
- Umpires: Ted Barrett (crew chief), Dan Bellino, Mike Everitt, Marty Foster, Ángel Hernández, Mark Wegner
- ALWC: New York Yankees defeated Minnesota Twins, 8–4

The 2017 American League Division Series were two best-of-five playoff series held in Major League Baseball's (MLB) 2017 postseason to determine the participating teams in the 2017 American League Championship Series. The three divisional winners (seeded 1–3) and a fourth team—the winner of a one-game Wild Card playoff—played in two series.

These matchups were:

- (1) Cleveland Indians (AL Central champions) vs. (4) New York Yankees (Wild Card Game winner): Yankees won the series, 3–2.
- (2) Houston Astros (AL West champions) vs. (3) Boston Red Sox (AL East champions): Astros won the series, 3–1.

The higher seeded team in each series hosted Games 1, 2, and 5 (if necessary). and the lower seeded team hosted Games 3 and 4 (if necessary).

For the first time, Major League Baseball sold presenting sponsorships to all of its postseason series; Doosan acquired presenting sponsorship to the ALDS, and thus the series was officially known as the American League Division Series presented by Doosan.

The Astros would go on to defeat the Yankees in the ALCS, then win the 2017 World Series over the National League champion Los Angeles Dodgers. It was the Astros first-ever MLB title.

== Matchups ==
=== Cleveland Indians vs. New York Yankees ===
New York won the series, 3–2.

Game	Date	Score	Location	Time	Attendance
1	October 5	New York Yankees – 0, Cleveland Indians – 4	Progressive Field	3:26	37,612
2	October 6	New York Yankees – 8, Cleveland Indians – 9 (13)	Progressive Field	5:08	37,681
3	October 8	Cleveland Indians – 0, New York Yankees – 1	Yankee Stadium	3:17	48,614
4	October 9	Cleveland Indians – 3, New York Yankees – 7	Yankee Stadium	3:47	47,316
5	October 11	New York Yankees – 5, Cleveland Indians – 2	Progressive Field	3:38	37,802

=== Boston Red Sox vs. Houston Astros ===
Houston won the series, 3–1.

Game	Date	Score	Location	Time	Attendance
1	October 5	Boston Red Sox – 2, Houston Astros – 8	Minute Maid Park	3:26	43,102
2	October 6	Boston Red Sox – 2, Houston Astros – 8	Minute Maid Park	4:00	43,410
3	October 8	Houston Astros – 3, Boston Red Sox – 10	Fenway Park	3:38	38,010
4	October 9	Houston Astros – 5, Boston Red Sox – 4	Fenway Park	4:07	37,305

== Cleveland vs. New York ==
This was the fourth postseason meeting between the Indians and Yankees, with Cleveland winning two of the three previous series including both times in the ALDS (1997 and 2007). The Yankees won the 1998 ALCS.

=== Game 1 ===
October 5, 2017 7:39 pm (EDT) at Progressive Field in Cleveland, Ohio, 67 °F (19 °C), clear
Team	1	2	3	4	5	6	7	8	9	R	H	E
New York	0	0	0	0	0	0	0	0	0	0	3	0
Cleveland	0	1	0	2	1	0	0	0	x	4	5	0
WP: Trevor Bauer (1–0) LP: Sonny Gray (0–1) Sv: Cody Allen (1); Home runs: NYY: None; CLE: Jay Bruce (1); Attendance: 37,612; Boxscore

Cy Young Award candidate Corey Kluber was not tapped for this start to give him full rest. Thus, the Indians started Trevor Bauer, who befuddled the Yankees. He was followed by strong bullpen innings by Andrew Miller and Cody Allen, resulting in only the fourth shutout the Yankees experienced all season. The Indians loaded the bases on a double, single, and walk with no outs off Sonny Gray in the second inning, but scored just one run on Roberto Pérez's double play. Jay Bruce's two-run home run in the fourth after a walk extended the Indians' lead to 3–0. After getting out of a bases-loaded one-out jam that inning, Adam Warren allowed a leadoff single in the fifth to José Ramírez, who moved to third on two wild pitches before scoring on Bruce's sacrifice fly off Jaime García for the game's final run as the Indians took a 1–0 series lead with a 4–0 win.

=== Game 2 ===
October 6, 2017 5:09 pm (EDT) at Progressive Field in Cleveland, Ohio, 68 °F (20 °C), overcast
Team	1	2	3	4	5	6	7	8	9	10	11	12	13	R	H	E
New York	2	0	4	0	2	0	0	0	0	0	0	0	0	8	11	3
Cleveland	2	1	0	0	0	4	0	1	0	0	0	0	1	9	9	2
WP: Josh Tomlin (1–0) LP: Dellin Betances (0–1); Home runs: NYY: Gary Sánchez (1), Aaron Hicks (1), Greg Bird (1); CLE: Francisco Lindor (1), Jay Bruce (2); Attendance: 37,681; Boxscore

Former Indians ace CC Sabathia faced off against current Indians ace Corey Kluber. Kluber lasted just 2 2/3 innings, giving up a season-high six runs. Gary Sánchez's two-run home run after a walk in the first put the Yankees up 2–0, but the Indians loaded the bases with one out on an error, walk, and hit-by-pitch before Carlos Santana tied the game with a two-run single. The Indians again loaded the bases in the second on a single, error, and intentional walk when Jason Kipnis's RBI single put the Indians up 3–2. In the third, Sánchez singled with one out, moved to second on a groundout, and scored on Starlin Castro's single to tie the game. After a Greg Bird single, Aaron Hicks's three-run home run put the Yankees up 6–3, chasing Kluber. Bird's two-run home run after a walk off Mike Clevinger extended the Yankees' lead to 8–3, but in the sixth, Sabathia was pulled by manager Joe Girardi with one on and one out. Later with two on and two outs, controversy occurred when relief pitcher Chad Green was charged with a hit by pitch on Lonnie Chisenhall to load the bases. Replays showed the ball to have hit the knob of the bat, which would have resulted in a strikeout on the foul tip to end the inning. Despite Yankees' catcher Gary Sánchez insisting that Girardi challenge it, Girardi decided not to do so, extending the inning. Two pitches later, Francisco Lindor hit a grand slam to bring the Indians within one. They tied the game in the bottom of the eighth on a home run by Jay Bruce off David Robertson before winning it in the 13th when Austin Jackson walked off Dellin Betances, stole second and scored on a walk-off single off the bat of Yan Gomes. This was Cleveland's final playoff win under the Indians moniker, as they were swept in 2018 and 2020 before changing names to the Guardians.

=== Game 3 ===
October 8, 2017 7:39 pm (EDT) at Yankee Stadium in The Bronx, New York, 77 °F (25 °C), cloudy
Team	1	2	3	4	5	6	7	8	9	R	H	E
Cleveland	0	0	0	0	0	0	0	0	0	0	5	0
New York	0	0	0	0	0	0	1	0	x	1	5	0
WP: Masahiro Tanaka (1–0) LP: Andrew Miller (0–1) Sv: Aroldis Chapman (1); Home runs: CLE: None; NYY: Greg Bird (2); Attendance: 48,614; Boxscore

With their season on the line, the Yankees started Masahiro Tanaka for Game three against the Indians' Carlos Carrasco. Tanaka pitched brilliantly, confusing Indians hitters for seven shutout innings with his splitter. Yankees right fielder Aaron Judge robbed Francisco Lindor of a two-run home run in the top of the sixth to preserve the scoreless tie. Yankees first baseman Greg Bird scored the game's only run on a home run off former Yankee reliever Andrew Miller in the seventh inning. The Indians threatened to score in the eighth and ninth innings, but relievers David Robertson and Aroldis Chapman managed to preserve the shutout and keep the Yankees' season alive.

=== Game 4 ===
October 9, 2017 7:09 pm (EDT) at Yankee Stadium in The Bronx, New York, 74 °F (23 °C), rain
Team	1	2	3	4	5	6	7	8	9	R	H	E
Cleveland	0	0	0	2	1	0	0	0	0	3	4	4
New York	0	4	1	0	1	1	0	0	x	7	8	0
WP: Luis Severino (1–0) LP: Trevor Bauer (1–1) Sv: Tommy Kahnle (1); Home runs: CLE: Carlos Santana (1), Roberto Pérez (1); NYY: Gary Sánchez (2); Attendance: 47,316; Boxscore

After lasting only 1/3 innings against the Minnesota Twins in the 2017 American League Wild Card Game, Yankees pitcher Luis Severino bounced back with seven strong innings. The Indians gave up seven runs on the night, but just one earned, as the Yankees took advantage of the Indians' four errors on the night. In the second, Starlin Castro reached on an error and moved to second on Roberto Perez's passed ball before Todd Frazier's double and Aaron Hicks's single scored a run each. After Brett Gardner singled and stole second, Aaron Judge's two-run double made it 4–0 Yankees. An errant throw on Gardner's ground ball with the bases loaded next inning off Mike Clevinger made it 5-0 Yankees. The Indians made it 5–2 on a two-run home run by Carlos Santana in the fourth and 5-3 after a home run by Roberto Pérez in the fifth. In the bottom of the fifth, Frazier reached second on an error off Danny Salazar, moved to third on a ground out, and scored on a Brett Gardner sacrifice fly off Tyler Olson. Next inning, a home run from Sánchez off Bryan Shaw, the only earned run the Yankees scored, put them up by four runs again. Reliever Tommy Kahnle earned the save for a tired bullpen as the Yankees tied up the series and forced a decisive fifth game in Cleveland.

=== Game 5 ===
October 11, 2017 8:09 pm (EDT) at Progressive Field in Cleveland, Ohio, 61 °F (16 °C), overcast
Team	1	2	3	4	5	6	7	8	9	R	H	E
New York	1	0	2	0	0	0	0	0	2	5	8	0
Cleveland	0	0	0	0	2	0	0	0	0	2	5	3
WP: David Robertson (1–0) LP: Corey Kluber (0–1) Sv: Aroldis Chapman (2); Home runs: NYY: Didi Gregorius 2 (2); CLE: None; Attendance: 37,802; Boxscore

The series returned to Cleveland for the fifth and decisive final game. Yankees shortstop Didi Gregorius hit home runs in back-to-back at bats in the first and third innings (two-run home run) to give the Yankees a 3–0 lead. The Indians sliced into the lead with four straight one-out singles, the last two by Roberto Pérez and Giovanny Urshela, in the bottom of the fifth, chasing Yankee starter CC Sabathia. In the top of the ninth with closer Cody Allen on the mound, the Yankees got runners on by a base hit by Aaron Hicks, who advanced to second on an error by Austin Jackson. A walk by Todd Frazier brought Brett Gardner to the plate with two on and two out. After a 12-pitch at bat, Gardner hit an RBI single scoring Hicks. Frazier then scored when Jay Bruce's throw bounced away from Francisco Lindor to make it 5–2. Aroldis Chapman pitched a two-inning save for his second save of the series. The Yankees clinched the ALDS when Chapman struck out Jackson, and completed the series comeback, becoming just the seventh team to come back from a 2–0 deficit in a division series since the wild-card format was introduced in 1995. The Yankees previously accomplished this feat in 2001 against the Oakland Athletics. They are also just the second team to do it twice in the Division Series after the Boston Red Sox, who accomplished this in 1999 (also against the Indians) and 2003 (also against the Athletics).

This marked the second consecutive year Cleveland lost three straight series-clinching games to lose a series after leading the 2016 World Series 3–1.

=== Composite line score ===
2017 ALDS (3–2): New York Yankees defeated Cleveland Indians.

Team	1	2	3	4	5	6	7	8	9	10	11	12	13	R	H	E
New York Yankees	3	4	7	0	3	1	1	0	2	0	0	0	0	21	35	3
Cleveland Indians	2	2	0	4	4	4	0	1	0	0	0	0	1	18	28	9
Total attendance: 209,025 Average attendance: 41,805

== Houston vs. Boston ==
This was the first postseason meeting between the Astros and Red Sox.

=== Game 1 ===
October 5, 2017 3:08 pm (CDT) at Minute Maid Park in Houston, Texas, 73 °F (23 °C), roof closed
Team	1	2	3	4	5	6	7	8	9	R	H	E
Boston	0	1	0	1	0	0	0	0	0	2	8	0
Houston	2	0	0	2	1	2	1	0	x	8	12	0
WP: Justin Verlander (1–0) LP: Chris Sale (0–1); Home runs: BOS: None; HOU: Alex Bregman (1), Jose Altuve 3 (3); Attendance: 43,102; Boxscore

The Astros got to work quickly against Chris Sale in Game 1 when Alex Bregman and Jose Altuve hit back-to-back home runs in the first inning to jump out to a quick 2–0 lead. The Red Sox answered with a run of their own in the top of the second when Sandy León drove in Mitch Moreland with an RBI single; however, the chance for more was cut off when Josh Reddick threw Dustin Pedroia out trying to take third on the play. Rafael Devers would tie the game in the fourth with a sacrifice fly to bring it to 2–2. Justin Verlander would end the threat there and hold the Red Sox to those two runs over six innings. In the bottom of the fourth, Marwin González laced a double to right-center to drive in two more runs while Altuve hit his second home run of the game, and second off Sale, in the fifth. Brian McCann continued the onslaught of Sale in the sixth when he hit a two-run single off Joe Kelly to bring the score to 7–2. Sale ended his day with five IP, seven earned runs, and three home runs allowed in his first postseason start. Altuve made Astros history in his next at-bat, homering for the third time of the game against Austin Maddox. He became the first Astros player to hit three home runs in a postseason game and just the ninth player ever to do so. It was the first time since Pablo Sandoval hit three homers off Verlander in Game 1 of the 2012 World Series. Joe Musgrove pitched a perfect ninth to seal the Astros victory and give them a 1–0 start to the series.

=== Game 2 ===
October 6, 2017 1:05 pm (CDT) at Minute Maid Park in Houston, Texas, 73 °F (23 °C), roof closed
Team	1	2	3	4	5	6	7	8	9	R	H	E
Boston	0	1	0	0	0	0	0	0	1	2	7	1
Houston	2	0	2	0	0	4	0	0	x	8	12	0
WP: Dallas Keuchel (1–0) LP: Drew Pomeranz (0–1); Home runs: BOS: None; HOU: Carlos Correa (1), George Springer (1); Attendance: 43,410; Boxscore

For the second straight day, the Astros defeated the Red Sox 8–2. Carlos Correa got the offense going with a two-run home run in the first inning off Drew Pomeranz. Jackie Bradley Jr. got Boston on the board in the second inning with an RBI single with two on. George Springer hit his first home run of the postseason in the bottom of the third while Jose Altuve drove in another run with a single after an Alex Bregman double. Dallas Keuchel went 5 2/3 innings with seven strikeouts and one earned run while Pomeranz did not make it out of the third inning while giving up four earned runs and giving up two home runs. The Astros broke the game open in the sixth. Eduardo Rodríguez allowed a leadoff single and subsequent hit-by-pitch. Springer's forceout off Addison Reed moved Marwin González to third before he scored on Bregman's sacrifice fly. After an intentional walk, Correa hit a two-run double, then Evan Gattis rounded out the inning with an RBI single. The Red Sox got a run in the ninth when Christian Vázquez singled with one out, moved to second on a wild pitch, and scored on Bradley Jr.'s RBI single before Ken Giles shut things down and gave the Astros a 2–0 advantage going into Boston for Game 3.

=== Game 3 ===
October 8, 2017 2:38 pm (EDT) at Fenway Park in Boston, Massachusetts, 72 °F (22 °C), cloudy
Team	1	2	3	4	5	6	7	8	9	R	H	E
Houston	3	0	0	0	0	0	0	0	0	3	13	2
Boston	0	1	3	0	0	0	6	0	x	10	15	0
WP: Joe Kelly (1–0) LP: Francisco Liriano (0–1); Home runs: HOU: Carlos Correa (2); BOS: Rafael Devers (1), Jackie Bradley Jr. (1); Attendance: 38,010; Boxscore

In Game 3, Houston, looking for a sweep, jump to a 3–0 lead when George Springer singled to lead off the first, moved to second on a wild pitch, and scored on Josh Reddick's single, then Carlos Correa hit a two-run home run one out later. However, Doug Fister and four relievers held the Astros scoreless for the rest of the game. The Red Sox loaded the bases with no outs in the second on two singles and a walk, but scored only once on Sandy León's single. Next inning, Mitch Moreland doubled with two outs and scored on Hanley Ramírez's double. Francisco Liriano relieved starter Brad Peacock and allowed a two-run home run to Rafael Devers that put the Red Sox up 4–3. The score remained that until the Red Sox blew the game open in the seventh. Lance McCullers Jr. allowed a leadoff walk and single, then Moreland singled to load the bases off Chris Devenski. Ramírez's double scored two and Devers's single scored another. Joe Musgrove relieved Devenski after getting an out, Jackie Bradley Jr.'s three-run home run capped the scoring at 10–3 Red Sox. Addison Reed and Carson Smith pitched a scoreless eighth and ninth, respectively, as the Red Sox forced a Game 4.

=== Game 4 ===
October 9, 2017 1:08 pm (EDT) at Fenway Park in Boston, Massachusetts, 73 °F (23 °C), cloudy
Team	1	2	3	4	5	6	7	8	9	R	H	E
Houston	1	1	0	0	0	0	0	2	1	5	12	0
Boston	1	0	0	0	2	0	0	0	1	4	9	1
WP: Justin Verlander (2–0) LP: Chris Sale (0–2) Sv: Ken Giles (1); Home runs: HOU: Alex Bregman (2); BOS: Xander Bogaerts (1), Andrew Benintendi (1), Rafael Devers (2); Attendance: 37,305; Boxscore

Trying to force a return to Houston for Game 5, the Red Sox sent 2016 AL Cy Young Award winner Rick Porcello to the mound to try and stifle the Astros offense while Charlie Morton was tasked with helping the Astros advance. The Astros struck first when George Springer scored on a groundball hit by Jose Altuve that resulted in a double play in the first inning. The Red Sox promptly responded with a home run by Xander Bogaerts in the bottom of the frame. Springer reclaimed the lead for the Astros with an RBI single in the top of the second while Morton was able to escape a bases-loaded, no-out jam in the bottom of the inning. Chris Sale was brought in for relief in the fourth and tossed four scoreless innings. In response, the Astros brought in Justin Verlander in the fifth to shut down the Sox, but not before Andrew Benintendi launched a 2-run homer to grab a 3–2 lead. Those would be the only runs Verlander gave up in his 2 1/3 innings of work. Alex Bregman rocked a game-tying shot in the top of the eighth off Sale, his second of the series. After giving up another hit, Sale's day was done. Craig Kimbrel was brought in and gave up a walk before Josh Reddick gave the Astros the lead on a two-out single to make it 4–3. Carlos Beltrán added an RBI double in the top of the ninth for an insurance run. Ken Giles, who pitched a scoreless eighth inning, gave up a leadoff inside-the-park home run to Rafael Devers in the bottom of the ninth. He then retired the side to send the Astros to their first American League Championship Series and their first postseason series win since the 2005 NLCS. The Red Sox were knocked out of the playoffs in the first round for the second year in a row, having been swept by the Cleveland Indians in the 2016 American League Division Series. Two days later, Farrell was fired by the Red Sox (having gone to the playoffs three times in five seasons with a World Series title and two first round exits); after the season ended, Alex Cora of the Astros coaching staff was hired as the Red Sox manager.

=== Composite line score ===
2017 ALDS (3–1): Houston Astros defeated Boston Red Sox.

Team	1	2	3	4	5	6	7	8	9	R	H	E
Boston Red Sox	1	3	3	1	2	0	6	0	2	18	39	2
Houston Astros	8	1	2	2	1	6	1	2	1	24	49	2
Total attendance: 161,827 Average attendance: 40,457

== See also ==
- 2017 National League Division Series
