= Luis Severino =

Dominican baseball player (born 1994)

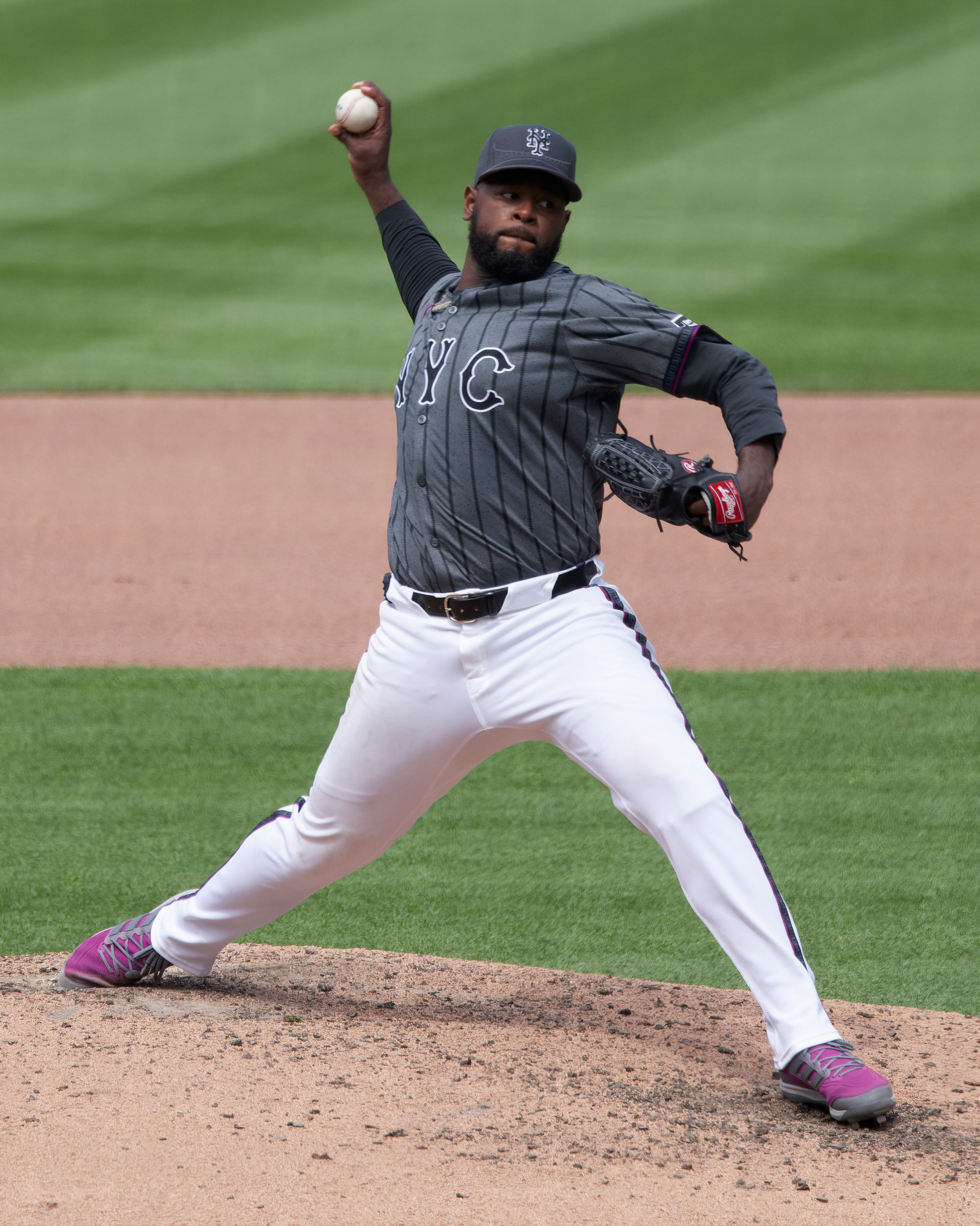
- Severino with the New York Mets in 2024

Athletics – No. 40
- Pitcher
- Born: February 20, 1994 (age 32); Sabana de la Mar, Dominican Republic
- Bats: Right Throws: Right

MLB debut
- August 5, 2015, for the New York Yankees

MLB statistics (through 2026 season)
- Win–loss record: 75–61
- Earned run average: 3.93
- Strikeouts: 1,138
- Stats at Baseball Reference

Teams
- New York Yankees (2015–2019, 2021–2023); New York Mets (2024); Athletics (2025–present)

Career highlights and awards
- 2× All-Star (2017, 2018)
Medals
Men's baseball
Representing Dominican Republic
World Baseball Classic
Bronze medal – third place	2026 Miami	Team

Luis Severino (born February 20, 1994), nicknamed "Sevy", is a Dominican professional baseball pitcher for the Athletics of Major League Baseball (MLB). He has previously played in MLB for the New York Yankees and New York Mets.

Severino signed with the Yankees as an international free agent in 2011, and made his MLB debut in 2015. After a rough 2016 season, he broke out as one of the league's best pitchers in 2017, being named an All-Star and finishing third in the American League Cy Young Award vote. He was also named an All-Star in 2018. He missed most of the 2019 and 2021 seasons and all of the 2020 season due to various injuries. Severino signed with the Mets after the 2023 season and with the Athletics after the 2024 season.

== Career ==
=== Minor leagues ===
Severino signed with the New York Yankees as an international free agent on December 26, 2011, agreeing on a $225,000 signing bonus. He had agreed to terms to sign with the Colorado Rockies, but a Yankees scout matched their offer and convinced Severino to play for the team he had grown up as a fan of. At the time, he could throw his fastball at 91 miles per hour (146 km/h). He made his professional debut for the Dominican Summer League (DSL) Yankees that year. He started 14 games, pitching to a 4–2 win–loss record with a 1.68 earned run average (ERA) and 45 strikeouts in 64 1/3 innings. He started 2013 with the DSL Yankees and was promoted to the Charleston RiverDogs of the Single–A South Atlantic League during the season. He finished 4–2 with a 2.45 ERA, 53 strikeouts over 44 innings in 10 games (eight starts). His fastball velocity reached 97 miles per hour (156 km/h) at Charleston.

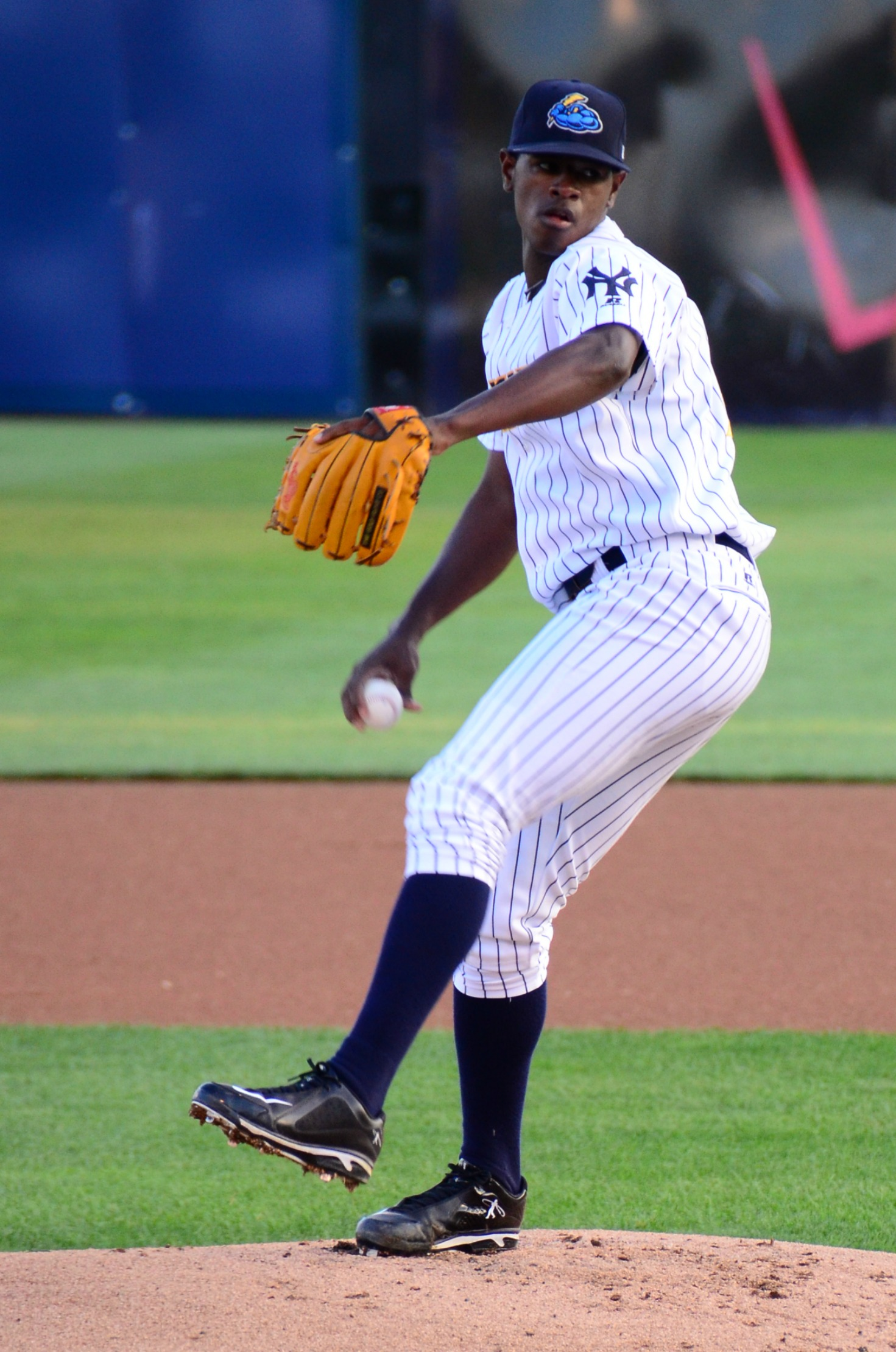
Severino with the Trenton Thunder in 2014

Prior to the 2014 season, Baseball America ranked him as the Yankees ninth-best prospect. Severino started the season with Charleston before being promoted to the Tampa Yankees of the High–A Florida State League. After his promotion to Tampa, he was selected to appear in the 2014 All-Star Futures Game in July. After the Futures Game, he was again promoted, to the Trenton Thunder of the Double–A Eastern League. Combined between the three teams, Severino went 6–5 win–loss record with a 2.46 ERA, 127 strikeouts, and 27 walks in 24 games (all starts) and 113 innings pitched. Before the start of the 2015 season, Severino was ranked the best prospect in the Yankees farm system and the 23rd best out of all minor league players by MLB Pipeline. He was ranked 35th by Baseball America.

Severino began the 2015 season with Trenton, where he had a 2–2 win–loss record with a 3.32 ERA and 48 strikeouts in 38 innings pitched across eight games started. He received a promotion to the Scranton/Wilkes-Barre RailRiders of the Triple–A International League, where he worked with RailRiders' pitching coach Scott Aldred to improve his pitching delivery. Severino pitched to a 7–0 win–loss record and a 1.91 ERA in 11 games started for Scranton/Wilkes-Barre through the end of July. With the Yankees in the postseason race, the Yankees made Severino unavailable in trade discussions for pitchers David Price, Cole Hamels, and Johnny Cueto at the MLB trade deadline of July 31.

=== New York Yankees ===
==== 2015 ====
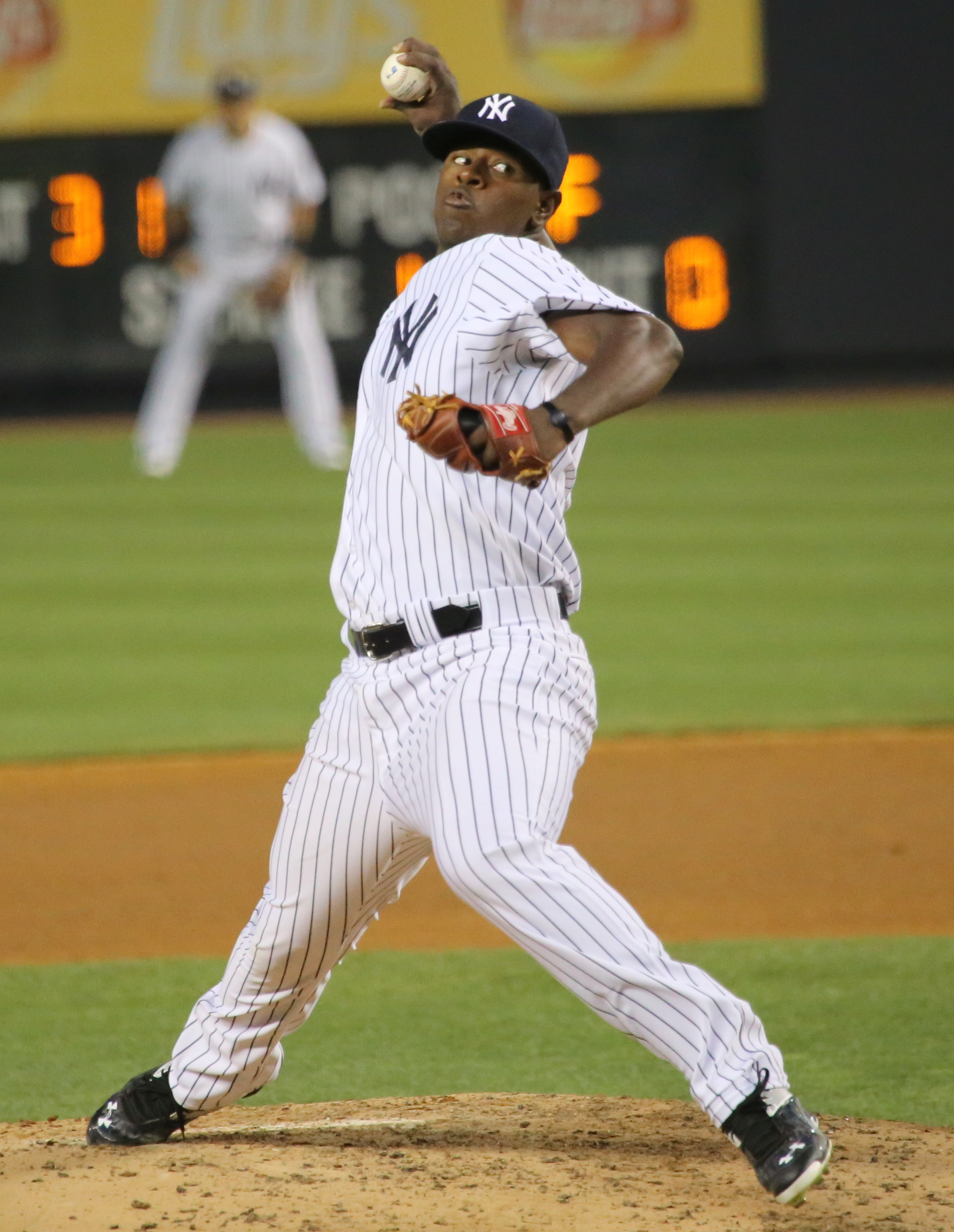
Severino with the Yankees in 2015

With a late-July injury to Michael Pineda, and the Yankees not acquiring a starting pitcher before the trade deadline, Brian Cashman, the general manager of the Yankees, announced that Severino's next start would come in the major leagues against the Boston Red Sox, the primary rival of the Yankees, at Yankee Stadium. Though Severino set a career-high with 113 innings pitched in the 2014 season, Cashman said that Severino would not be limited in how many innings he throws over the remainder of the 2015 season, in part because they limited his innings earlier in the season.

Yankees' manager Joe Girardi set Severino's major league debut for August 5. Severino pitched five innings in his debut, allowing two hits, two runs (one earned), with seven strikeouts and no walks. At age 21, he was the youngest pitcher to make a start in the 2015 MLB season. Additionally, he became the first AL pitcher in MLB history to strike out seven hitters while walking none and allowing no more than two hits in their major league debut. He ended his rookie season having started 11 games, pitching 62 1/3 innings with a 5–3 record, 2.89 ERA and 56 strikeouts.

==== 2016 ====
Severino began the 2016 season in the Yankees starting rotation. In a game against the Chicago White Sox on May 13, 2016, Severino left the game with an apparent injury after giving up 7 runs in 2.2 innings. The next day, he was placed on the 15-day disabled list due to right triceps inflammation. On May 30, 2016, he was activated from the disabled list, and optioned to the Triple-A Scranton/Wilkes-Barre RailRiders. He was called back up on July 25 and was primarily used as a reliever for the remainder of the season. On September 26, Severino was ejected for the first time in his major league career after hitting Justin Smoak with a pitch. This followed after he hit Josh Donaldson on the elbow in the first inning and Toronto Blue Jays starter J. A. Happ hit Chase Headley with a pitch in the 2nd inning.

Severino finished the 2016 season with a 3–8 record and an ERA of 5.83. In his 11 starts, he went 0–8 with an 8.50 ERA and 1.78 WHIP. However, in his 11 relief appearances, he went 3–0 with a 0.39 ERA and 0.77 WHIP.

==== 2017 ====
Following spring training, Severino was named the Yankees fourth starter. On April 13, 2017, Severino struck out a career-high 11 batters in seven innings as the Yankees won 3–2 over the Tampa Bay Rays. In his following start, Severino struck out 10 batters in a career-high eight innings in a 4–1 loss to the Chicago White Sox. On April 26, Severino pitched seven shutout innings against the Boston Red Sox. On May 24, he pitched eight shutout innings against the Kansas City Royals. As of June 10, he had a 5–2 record with a 2.75 ERA. In a no-decision, Severino struck out a career-high 12 batters in seven innings against the White Sox on June 27 as the bullpen blew a lead for the sixth time in his starts. Despite his strong start, Severino struggled to end the first half, allowing 16 earned runs in four starts from June 15 to July 2, for a 7.03 ERA in that span. He finished his first half on a high note though, striking out 10 batters over seven innings of three-run ball against the Milwaukee Brewers on July 8, his fourth start of the season with at least 10 strikeouts. Severino was named to the American League All-Star team alongside his teammates Aaron Judge, Gary Sánchez, Starlin Castro and Dellin Betances. In the first half of the season, he had posted a 5–4 record with a 3.54 ERA and 124 strikeouts in 106 1/3 innings. His 10.50 strikeout per-9 ratio ranked in the top five of the AL.

Severino started the second half strong, first matching Chris Sale by allowing one run over seven innings in a pitcher's duel against the Red Sox. In his next start, he fired seven shutout innings against the Seattle Mariners and then allowed zero earned runs in seven innings against the Cincinnati Reds. As of July 27, Severino was tied with Max Scherzer for second-most starts (8) of at least seven innings pitched with one earned run or less in the 2017 season, behind Clayton Kershaw's 11. On August 17, 2017, Severino collected his first major league hit off of Steven Matz against the New York Mets. He collected his 11th win holding the Detroit Tigers to one earned run over 6 2/3 innings with eight strikeouts on August 23. On September 3 against the Red Sox, Severino struck out his 200th batter of the season, becoming the second-youngest Yankee in franchise history with 200 strikeouts in one season behind Al Downing in 1964. In the second half of the season, he went 9–2 with a 2.28 ERA in 14 starts, allowing no more than one earned run in ten of those starts.

Severino ended the season having thrown a career-high 193 1/3 innings in 31 starts, with a 14–6 record, 2.98 ERA, 1.04 WHIP, .208 opponent batting average, 5.3 bWAR, 5.7 fWAR and 230 strikeouts, tied with CC Sabathia for the third-most single-season strikeouts in Yankees history, and the most strikeouts in a single season by a right-handed pitcher in Yankees history in the Modern Era (post 1920). He also became the first Yankee starter to qualify for the ERA title with a sub-3.00 ERA since David Cone and Andy Pettitte both did so in 1997 and the youngest Yankee starter to do so since Dave Righetti in 1981. His 16 starts of one run allowed or less led the major leagues, additionally he was the first Yankee starter to have 16 starts with one or no runs allowed in a single season since Mike Mussina in 2001 and the youngest pitcher in the major leagues to reach this mark since Dwight Gooden in 1985. He also became the first AL pitcher with an ERA below 3.00 and 230 or more strikeouts in their age-23 season or younger since Roger Clemens in 1986. He led all major league pitchers with an average fastball velocity of 97.6 miles per hour.

Severino was chosen to start the 2017 American League Wild Card Game; he was removed from the game after giving up three earned runs in one-third of an inning, tied for the shortest outing by a Yankees pitcher in the postseason. He went on to finish the 2017 postseason with a 1–1 record and a 5.68 ERA in 16 innings (4 starts) as the Yankees lost to the Houston Astros in seven games in the American League Championship Series. On November 6, Severino was named a finalist for the American League Cy Young Award. He finished third in the voting, behind Corey Kluber and Chris Sale. He received 20 third-place votes, 6 fourth-place votes and 1 fifth place vote, for a total of 73 points.

==== 2018 ====
On March 17, 2018, the Yankees named Severino their Opening Day starter. He struck out seven and allowed one hit in 5 2/3 innings against the Toronto Blue Jays. On May 2 against the Houston Astros, Severino pitched a complete game for the first time in his major league career, shutting out the Astros 4–0. Severino allowed zero runs and struck out 10. From April 16 to June 4, Severino posted ten consecutive quality starts of at least six innings pitched and three earned runs or less allowed (in six of those he allowed one or no earned runs), during this time span he went 7–0 with a 1.85 ERA in 68 innings, giving up only 45 hits (4 home runs), striking out 82, walking just 14 batters, and limiting opponents to a .184 batting average. Severino earned his 10th win of the season on June 16 after limiting the Rays to three hits and two walks in eight shutout innings with nine strikeouts, double his win count prior to the All-Star break in 2017, and becoming the first Yankee pitcher to win 10 or more games prior to the All-Star break since Masahiro Tanaka in 2014. On July 1, Severino became the first Yankee since CC Sabathia in 2011 to win 13 games prior to the All-Star break after throwing 6 2/3 shutout innings to beat the Red Sox.

Owning a 14–2 record and a 2.12 ERA, Severino was named to the 2018 MLB All-Star Game, his second consecutive selection. He finished the first half of the season 14–2 with a 2.31 ERA in 20 starts, with 144 strikeouts against 32 walks in 128 1/3 innings and posting a .209 opponent batting average and 1.01 WHIP. Severino became the first Yankees pitcher to enter the All-Star break with 14 wins since Mel Stottlemyre in 1969 and only the fourth to ever do so (Lefty Gomez and Whitey Ford did so in 1934 and 1961 respectively, with Ford holding the club record for most pre-All Star game wins with 16).

For the season, he was 19–8, with a 3.39 ERA. He had the highest line drive percentage allowed (25.9%) of all major league pitchers. For the second consecutive year, he led all major league pitchers with an average fastball velocity of 97.6 miles per hour.

Severino started the 2018 American League Wild Card Game.

==== 2019 ====
On February 15, 2019, Severino signed a four-year, $40 million contract extension with the Yankees that included a club option for a fifth season worth an additional $12.25 million.

On March 15, it was revealed that Severino was diagnosed with rotator cuff inflammation on his right shoulder. This put him out of action for all of April. On April 9, it was revealed that Severino was diagnosed with a Grade 2 lat strain, ruling him out for an additional six weeks. He did not play in any rehab assignments until September. He started for the Yankees on September 17 against the Los Angeles Angels, and made two more starts in the regular season.

==== 2020 ====
On February 25, 2020, it was announced that Severino would undergo Tommy John surgery to repair a partially torn ulnar collateral ligament in his right elbow, ending his 2020 season. He officially underwent the surgery on February 27 along with removing a bone chip from his right elbow.

==== 2021 ====
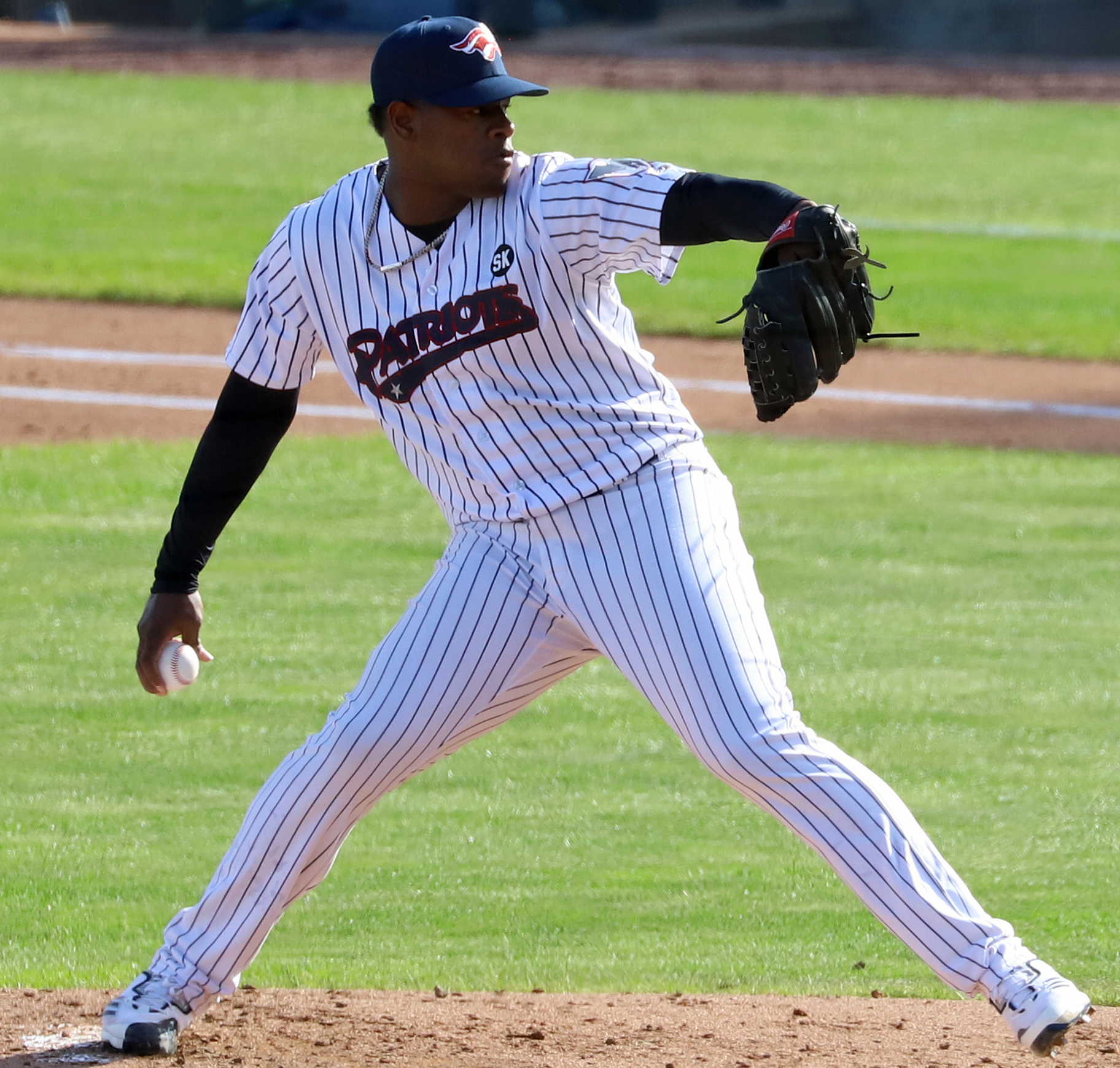
Severino with the Somerset Patriots in 2021

On February 22, 2021, Severino was placed on the 60-day injured list as he continued to recover from Tommy John surgery. On June 12, Severino suffered a groin injury during a rehab start with the Hudson Valley Renegades and was sidelined until August. After pitching two rehab starts in August, Severino suffered another setback after "not feeling right" during warmups before a game. On September 20, Severino was activated off the injured list for the first time in 706 days.

==== 2022 ====
With Brett Gardner not re-signing for the 2022 season, Severino became the longest-tenured Yankee. He was placed on the 60-day injured list with a low-grade right lat strain. On October 4, during a game against the Texas Rangers at Globe Life Field, Severino pitched seven no-hit innings before manager Aaron Boone pulled him from the game with 94 pitches. The potential combined no-hitter was broken up in the eighth inning when Josh Jung recorded a hit off Yankees reliever Miguel Castro.

==== 2023 ====
In 2023, Severino was met with struggles and inconsistency. Across 19 games (18 starts), he registered a 4–8 record and 6.65 ERA with 79 strikeouts in 89 1/3 innings pitched. On September 9, 2023, manager Aaron Boone announced that Severino's season was over after he suffered a high–grade oblique strain in the Yankees' loss against the Milwaukee Brewers the previous day. He became a free agent following the season.

=== New York Mets ===
On December 1, 2023, Severino signed a one-year, $13 million contract with the New York Mets.

On August 17, 2024, Severino pitched his second career complete game in a 4–0 shutout win over the Miami Marlins. It was his first complete game shutout since 2018, and he became the first Mets pitcher to accomplish the feat since Jacob deGrom in 2021.

Across 32 games for New York, Severino posted an 11–7 record, a 3.91 ERA, and 161 strikeouts in 182 innings pitched. He became a free agent after the season. The Mets offered Severino a qualifying offer, which he declined.

=== Athletics ===
On December 6, 2024, Severino signed a three-year, $67 million contract with the Athletics, the largest contract in team history. Severino made 29 starts for the Athletics during the 2025 campaign, compiling a 2-6 record and 4.16 ERA with 65 strikeouts across 62 2/3 innings pitched.

On May 30, 2026, Severino was placed on the injured list due to a right shoulder strain. He was transferred to the 60-day injured list on June 21.

== Pitching style ==
With a three-quarters delivery, Severino currently throws four pitches: a four-seam fastball averaging 98 mph, a slider, a changeup, and as of 2022, a cutter. His fastball was clocked at 101 mph in 2017. His average spin rate for sliders was ranked no. 2 in MLB (2,910 rpm) behind Garrett Richards (2,919 rpm) in 2018.

== Personal life ==
Severino is from Sabana de la Mar, in the Hato Mayor province of the Dominican Republic. He grew up a fan of the Yankees, particularly fellow Dominican Robinson Canó. Severino and his wife, Rosmaly, have one daughter, who was born in July 2015. Severino's second child, a son, Luis Jr, was born on July 8, 2021.
