= Eddie Rosario =

Puerto Rican baseball player (born 1991)

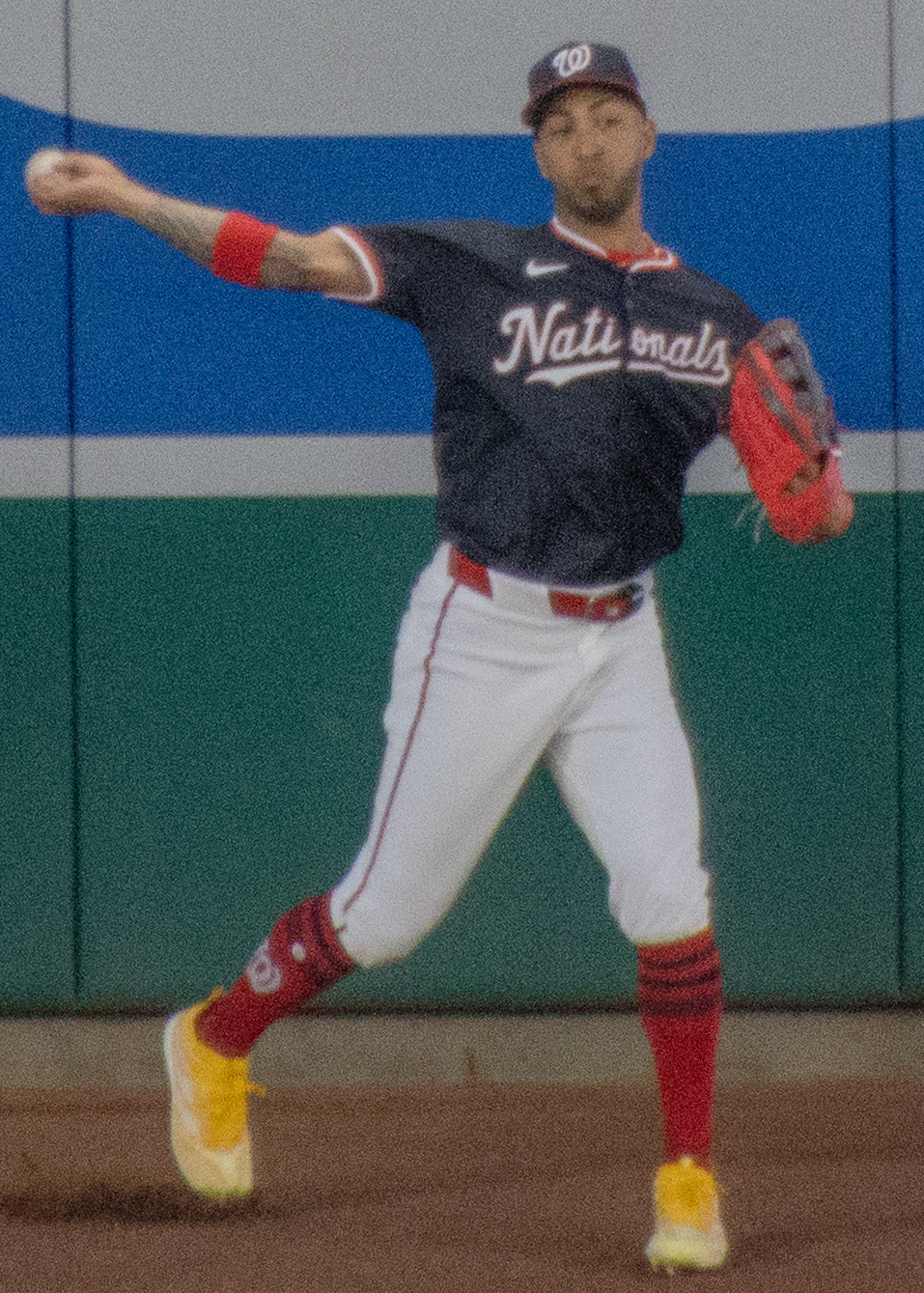
- Rosario with the Washington Nationals in 2024

Free agent
- Left fielder
- Born: September 28, 1991 (age 34); Guayama, Puerto Rico
- Bats: Left Throws: Right

MLB debut
- May 6, 2015, for the Minnesota Twins

MLB statistics (through 2025 season)
- Batting average: .261
- Hits: 1,064
- Home runs: 169
- Runs batted in: 583
- Stats at Baseball Reference

Teams
- Minnesota Twins (2015–2020); Cleveland Indians (2021); Atlanta Braves (2021–2023); Washington Nationals (2024); Atlanta Braves (2024); Los Angeles Dodgers (2025); Atlanta Braves (2025)

Career highlights and awards
- World Series champion (2021); NLCS MVP (2021)
Medals
Men's baseball
Representing Puerto Rico
World Baseball Classic
Silver medal – second place	2013 San Francisco	Team
Silver medal – second place	2017 Los Angeles	Team

Eddie Manuel Rosario, Jr. (born September 28, 1991) is a Puerto Rican professional baseball left fielder who is a free agent. He has previously played in Major League Baseball (MLB) for the Minnesota Twins, Cleveland Indians, Atlanta Braves, Washington Nationals, and Los Angeles Dodgers.

Rosario was selected by the Minnesota Twins in the fourth round of the 2010 MLB draft. After the 2013 season, he received a 50-game suspension for using a banned substance, which he served at the start of the 2014 season. Rosario made his MLB debut with the Twins in 2015, hitting a home run, on the first pitch of his first career at bat. He was named National League Championship Series MVP and won the World Series with the Braves in 2021. Rosario has represented Puerto Rico in the 2013, 2017, and 2023 editions of the World Baseball Classic, winning a silver medal in his first two appearances.

== Early life ==
Eddie Rosario was born to parents Eddie Sr. and Maria on September 28, 1991. He was raised in Guayama, Puerto Rico.

== Professional career ==
=== Minnesota Twins ===
Rosario was scouted by Hector Otero, who worked for the Minnesota Twins at the time, as the organization's lead scout for South Florida and Puerto Rico. Rosario was subsequently selected by the Minnesota Twins in the fourth round of the 2010 MLB draft.

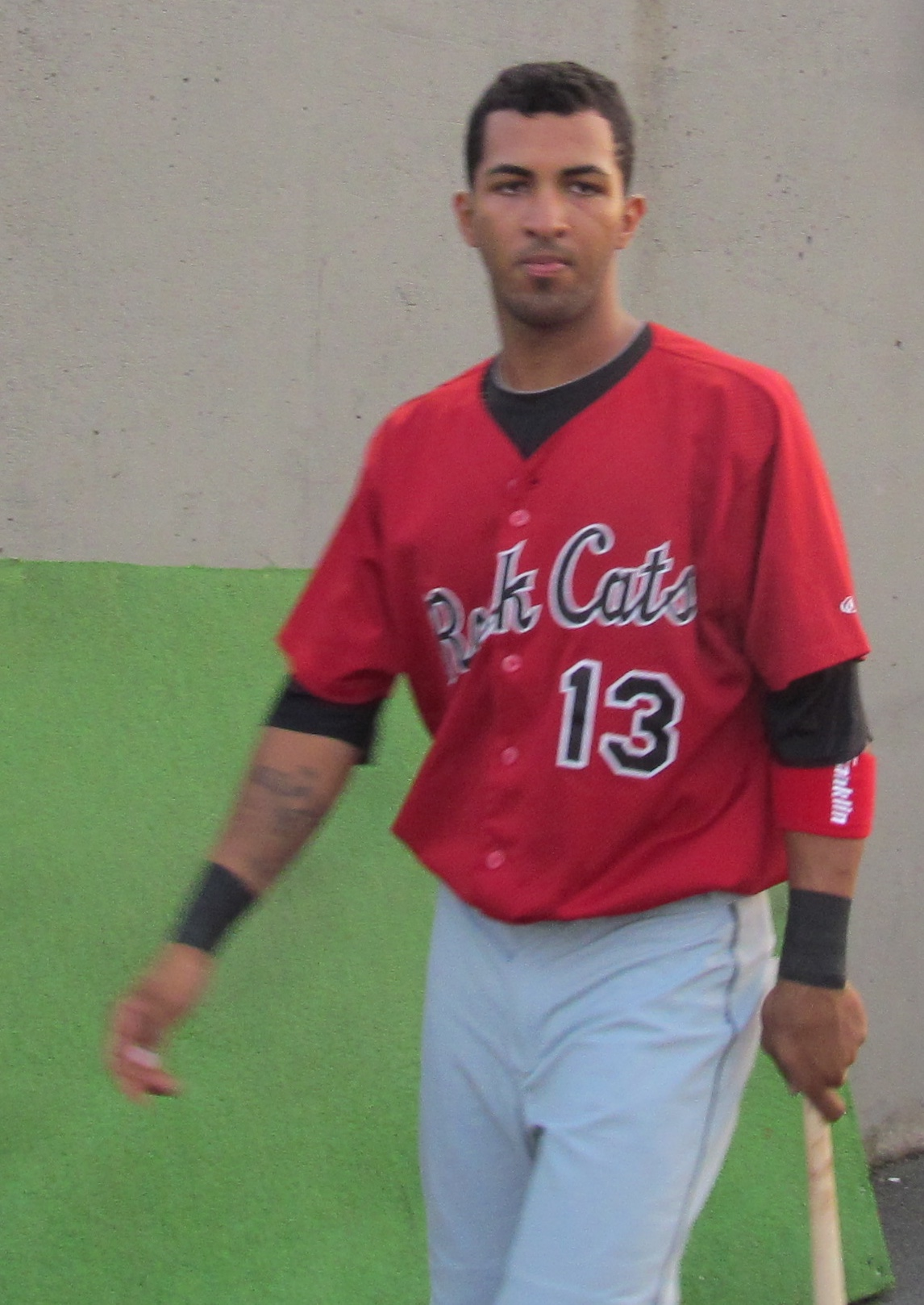
Rosario with the New Britain Rock Cats in 2013

Rosario first played in Minor League Baseball in 2010, in the Gulf Coast League. He advanced through the farm system of the Twins, first reaching Double-A in 2013 and Triple-A in 2015. He also played several seasons in the Puerto Rican Winter League, and played in the Arizona Fall League in 2013 and 2014.

Rosario made his major league debut on May 6, 2015. Leading off the bottom of the 3rd inning, Rosario swung at the first pitch he saw from Oakland Athletics starter Scott Kazmir, and hit an opposite-field home run, becoming the 115th player in major league history to hit a home run in his first at-bat. Rosario played in 122 games for the Twins, sharing outfield duties with Torii Hunter, Aaron Hicks, and fellow prospect Byron Buxton. Despite being called up a month into the season, Rosario led all of baseball in triples with 15, and was second in outfield assists with 16, just one behind Avisail García of the Chicago White Sox. Rosario finished his rookie campaign with a .267 batting average and 13 home runs.

With the retirement of Torii Hunter and the Twins' trade of Aaron Hicks, Rosario entered 2016 as the Twins' projected everyday left fielder. After a slow start and the emergence of both Robbie Grossman and Max Kepler, Rosario saw his playing time dwindle ultimately leading to his demotion to Triple-A. He was brought back up towards the end of the season, and finished the year batting .269/.296/.421 with 10 home runs, and 32 RBI in 92 games played. In 2017, Rosario became the Twins’ everyday left fielder and emerged into one of the AL’s best hitters. On June 13 he had his first career 3 home run game going 4-5 and driving in 5 runs. Later in the season he won his first Player of the Week for the week of August 13, going .444/.484/1.000 with 4 home runs. He ranked in the top 25 for batting average, OPS, slugging, and doubles. In 151 games he batted .290 with 27 home runs and 78 RBI.

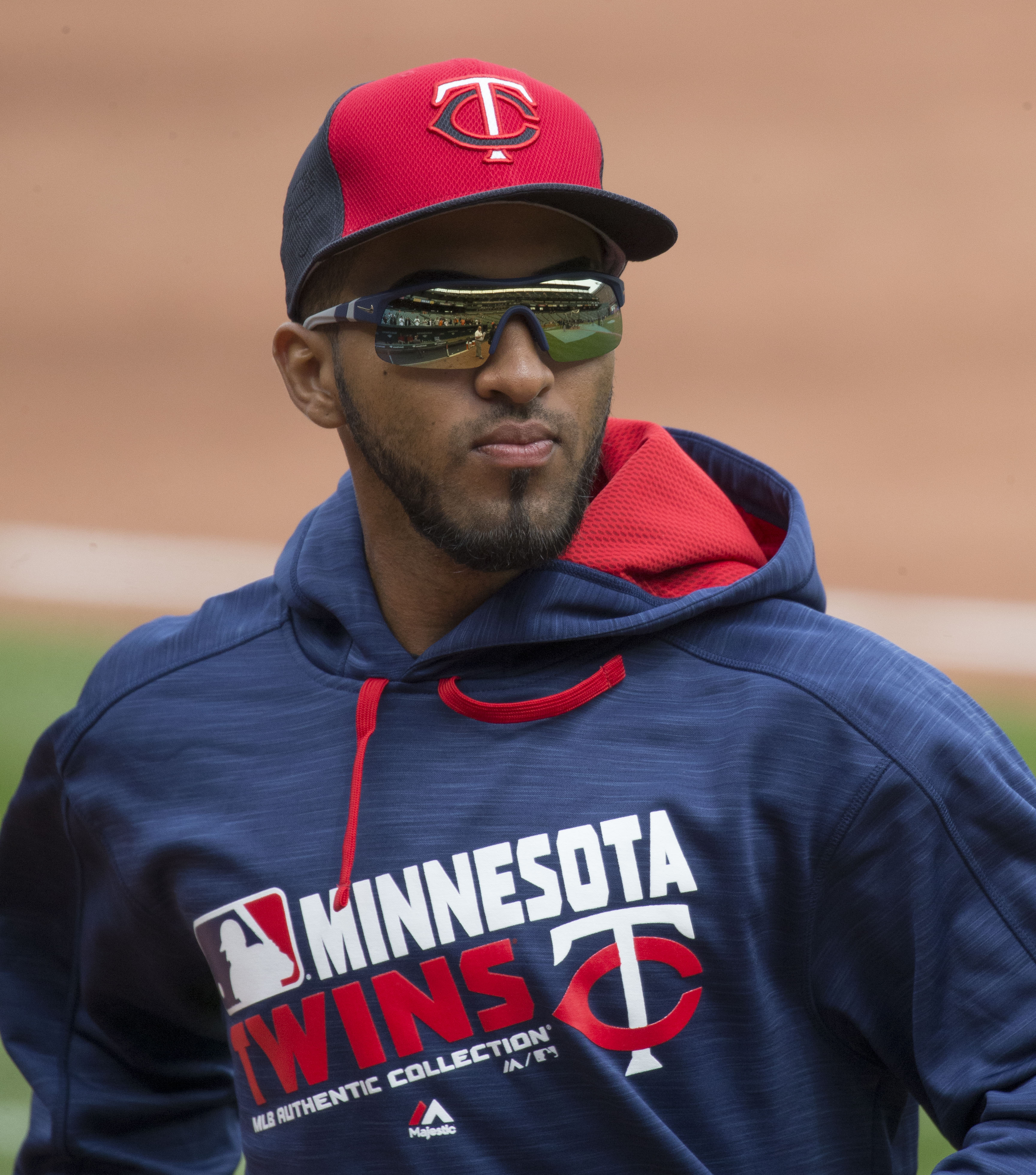
Rosario with the Minnesota Twins in 2017

On April 18, 2018, before a sold-out crowd at the Hiram Bithorn Stadium in his homeland Puerto Rico, Rosario scored the winning run in the bottom of the 16th inning, coming around on Ryan LaMarre’s single that gave Minnesota a 2–1 win over the Cleveland Indians. Rosario hit three home runs in a game for the second time in his career on June 3 against the Cleveland Indians, going 3-5, driving in four runs, while hitting the game winning walk-off home run. He finished the season with the lowest fielding percentage among major league left fielders, at .967, and batted .288 with 24 home runs, 77 RBI, and a career high 161 hits in 138 games. Rosario was considered an All-Star "snub" in 2018. In 2019 he batted .276/.300/.500. He swung at the highest percentage of all pitches of all American League batters (59.1%). In 57 games in 2020, he batted .257 with 13 home runs and led the team with 42 RBI. On December 1, 2020, Rosario was placed on outright waivers and cleared waivers the next day. On December 2, Rosario was non-tendered by the Twins.

=== Cleveland Indians ===
On February 4, 2021, Rosario was signed to a one-year, $8 million contract with the Cleveland Indians. He played 78 games for the team, batting .254/.296/.389 with a .685 on-base plus slugging percentage. He was placed on the injured list on July 5.

=== Atlanta Braves ===
On July 30, 2021, Rosario was traded to the Atlanta Braves along with cash considerations in exchange for Pablo Sandoval. On September 19, Rosario hit for the cycle against the San Francisco Giants. In four at-bats, Rosario saw five pitches, the fewest pitches seen in a cycle since at least the 1990 season. In 2021, between both teams he batted .259/.305/.435 with 14 home runs and 62 RBIs.

On October 17, Rosario recorded four hits, including a walk-off single, in Game 2 of the National League Championship Series that gave the Braves a 5–4 win over the Los Angeles Dodgers. The 2021 Braves became the fourth team in Major League Baseball history to record two walk-off wins in the first two games of a postseason series, as Rosario matched the feat of teammate Austin Riley, who hit a walk-off single in Game 1. Rosario recorded two home runs and a triple as part of a second four-hit game in Game 4 of the series, following Steve Garvey as the only players to record those base hits in the postseason. Rosario was the fifth major league player to record two four-hit games during the playoffs, and the second to have both four-hit games occur in the same series. Teammate Adam Duvall followed Rosario's first home run of the game with a home run of his own, and they became the third pair of Braves teammates to hit consecutive home runs during a postseason game. In Game 6, Rosario had two hits, including a three-run home run as the Braves won 4–2 and clinched their first National League pennant since 1999. Rosario was awarded the NLCS MVP award for his performance in the series.

On March 16, 2022, Rosario returned to the Braves on a two-year contract worth $18 million with a club option for the 2024 season. He began his season with miserable play, accumulating just 3 hits for a batting average of .068 - a slump later revealed to be a result of issues in his right eye. Tests showed that Rosario's right retina was swollen, leading to blurred vision. A surgical procedure was scheduled for April 27, for which Rosario was projected to miss at least eight weeks. After making several rehab appearances in Triple-A Gwinnett and assembling a .273 batting average, he returned to the team on July 4. In 2022 with the Braves he batted .212/.259/.328 in 250 at bats. At the end of the 2023 season, Atlanta declined Rosario's contract option, making him a free agent.

=== Washington Nationals ===
On March 6, 2024, Rosario signed a minor league contract with the Washington Nationals. On March 24, the Nationals selected Rosario's contract. In 67 games for Washington, he batted .183/.226/.329 with seven home runs, 26 RBI, and eight stolen bases. Rosario was designated for assignment following the promotion of James Wood on July 1. He was released by the Nationals organization on July 3.

=== Atlanta Braves (second stint) ===
On July 5, 2024, Rosario signed a minor league contract with the Atlanta Braves. After three games for the Triple–A Gwinnett Stripers, his contract was purchased to the active roster on July 8. In 24 games for the Braves, Rosario batted .154/.181/.282 with three home runs and nine RBI. On August 8, he was designated for assignment by Atlanta. Rosario cleared waivers and was sent outright to Gwinnett on August 10. He subsequently rejected the assignment in lieu of free agency the following day.

=== New York Mets ===
On August 13, 2024, Rosario signed a minor league contract with the New York Mets. In 7 games for the Triple–A Syracuse Mets, he went 3–for–29 (.103) with one home run and two RBI. Rosario was released by the Mets organization on August 25.

=== Los Angeles Dodgers ===
On February 15, 2025, Rosario signed a minor league contract with the Los Angeles Dodgers. After beginning the season with the Triple-A Oklahoma City Comets, his contract was purchased by the Dodgers and he was recalled to the majors on April 18. Rosario appeared in two games for the Dodgers and had one hit in four at-bats as the designated hitter before being designated for assignment on April 20. He elected to become a free agent on April 25 rather than accept an outright assignment to the minor leagues.

=== Atlanta Braves (third stint) ===
On April 28, 2025, Rosario signed a major league contract with the Atlanta Braves. He appeared in three games for the Braves, being held hitless in four at-bats. On May 9, Rosario was designated for assignment by Atlanta. He elected to become a free agent on May 11 rather than accept an outright assignment to the minor leagues.

=== Milwaukee Brewers ===
On May 14, 2025, Rosario signed a minor league contract with the Milwaukee Brewers. In 20 appearances for the Triple-A Nashville Sounds, he batted .290/.373/.449 with two home runs, 11 RBI, and six stolen bases. On June 15, Rosario exercised an opt-out clause in his contract and became a free agent.

== International career ==
Rosario played for Puerto Rico in their silver medal run of the 2013 World Baseball Classic, their silver medal run of the 2017 World Baseball Classic, and their quarterfinal run in the 2023 World Baseball Classic.

== Personal life ==
Rosario and his wife, Milany, have three children. They reside in Kissimmee, Florida during the offseason.

== See also ==
- List of Major League Baseball players from Puerto Rico
- List of Major League Baseball players with a home run in their first major league at bat
- List of Major League Baseball players to hit for the cycle

Achievements
Preceded by Freddie Freeman	Hitting for the cycle September 19, 2021	Succeeded by Christian Yelich
