= Gary Sánchez =

Dominican baseball player (born 1992)

- Sánchez during the 2026 World Series postgame celebration

Free agent
- Catcher / Designated hitter
- Born: December 2, 1992 (age 33); Santo Domingo, Distrito Nacional, Dominican Republic
- Bats: Right Throws: Right

MLB debut
- October 3, 2015, for the New York Yankees

MLB statistics (through 2026 season)
- Batting average: .223
- Home runs: 201
- Runs batted in: 547
- Stats at Baseball Reference

Teams
- New York Yankees (2015–2021); Minnesota Twins (2022); New York Mets (2023); San Diego Padres (2023); Milwaukee Brewers (2024); Baltimore Orioles (2025); Milwaukee Brewers (2026)

Career highlights and awards
- World Series champion (2026); 2× All-Star (2017, 2019); Silver Slugger Award (2017)

Gary Sánchez Herrera (born December 2, 1992) is a Dominican professional baseball catcher who is a free agent. He has previously played in Major League Baseball (MLB) for the New York Yankees, Minnesota Twins, New York Mets, San Diego Padres, Milwaukee Brewers, and Baltimore Orioles.

Sánchez made his MLB debut in 2015 and was named the American League's Rookie of the Month and Player of the Month for August 2016. He finished in second place in Rookie of the Year voting despite playing in only 53 games. He was named an All-Star and Silver Slugger in 2017. Sánchez is the fastest catcher in MLB history to hit 100 home runs.

== Early life ==
Gary Sánchez Herrera was born on December 2, 1992, in Santo Domingo, Distrito Nacional, Dominican Republic. Sánchez grew up in La Victoria, Dominican Republic. His parents separated when he was young and he, his three brothers, and one sister were raised by their mother, Orquidia Herrera, and her mother, Agustina Pena, though they saw their father frequently. One of his brothers, Miguel Sánchez, played in the Seattle Mariners organization.

== Professional career ==
=== Minor leagues ===
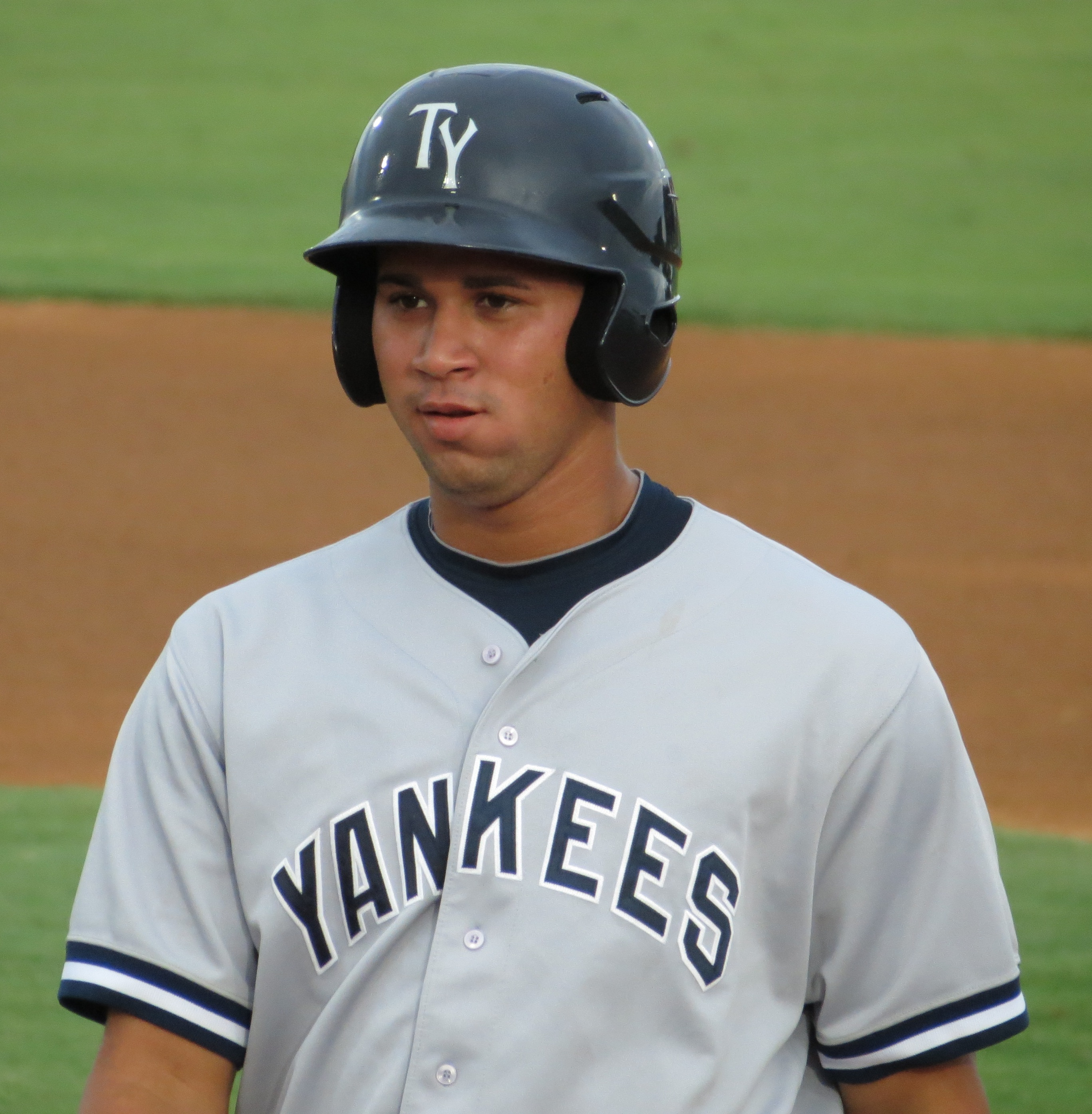
Sánchez with the Tampa Yankees in 2012

Sánchez signed with the New York Yankees as an international free agent on July 2, 2009, receiving a $3 million signing bonus. Before the 2010 season, Baseball America ranked him as the Yankees' seventh-best prospect. He began his professional career playing for the rookie-level Gulf Coast League Yankees. On August 18, 2010, he was promoted to the Staten Island Yankees of the Low-A New York–Penn League. He finished the season hitting .329/.393/.543 with eight home runs and 43 runs batted in (RBIs) in 47 games.

Before the 2011 season, Sánchez was ranked among the top prospects in baseball. He was rated as the second best prospect in the Yankees organization and 30th best prospect overall by Baseball America. He spent the season playing for the Charleston RiverDogs of the Single-A South Atlantic League. He played in 82 games before suffering a season ending finger injury. He finished the season hitting .256/.335/.485 with 17 home runs and 52 RBIs.

Before the 2012 season, Sánchez was ranked as the Yankees fourth best prospect by Baseball America. He began the 2012 season with Charleston and received a midseason promotion to the Tampa Yankees of the High-A Florida State League.

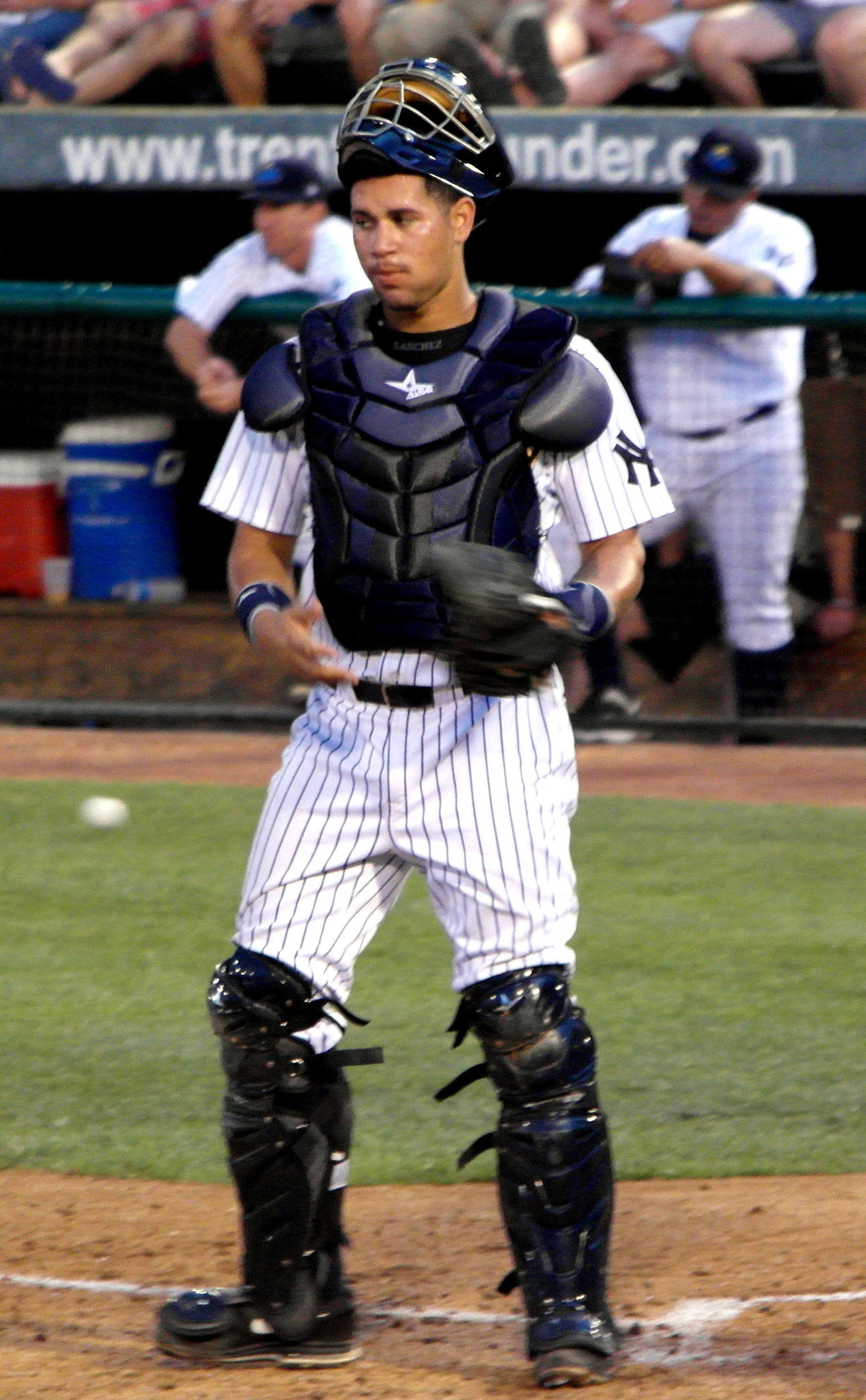
Sánchez with the Trenton Thunder in 2014

Sánchez began the 2013 season with Tampa. After batting .254 with 13 home runs and 61 RBIs, the Yankees promoted him to the Trenton Thunder of the Double-A Eastern League on August 3. He was added to the Yankees' 40-man roster after the 2013 season. Sánchez began the 2015 season with Trenton and was chosen to represent the Yankees at the 2015 All-Star Futures Game. After the Futures Game, the Yankees promoted Sánchez to the Scranton/Wilkes-Barre RailRiders of the Triple-A International League, where he hit a home run in his first at-bat.

=== New York Yankees (2015–2021) ===
==== 2015 ====
After the conclusion of the RailRiders' 2015 season, the Yankees promoted Sánchez to the major leagues. He made his major league debut as a pinch hitter on October 3. He went hitless in two at bats during the regular season. The Yankees included him on their 25-man roster for the 2015 American League (AL) Wild Card Game. The Yankees then assigned Sánchez to the Arizona Fall League (AFL) after the season. He led the AFL in home runs, and was named the Fall Stars Game Most Valuable Player, and the second-best prospect in the AFL by Baseball America. As a result of his strong season, the Yankees felt comfortable trading fellow catcher John Ryan Murphy during the offseason.

==== 2016 ====
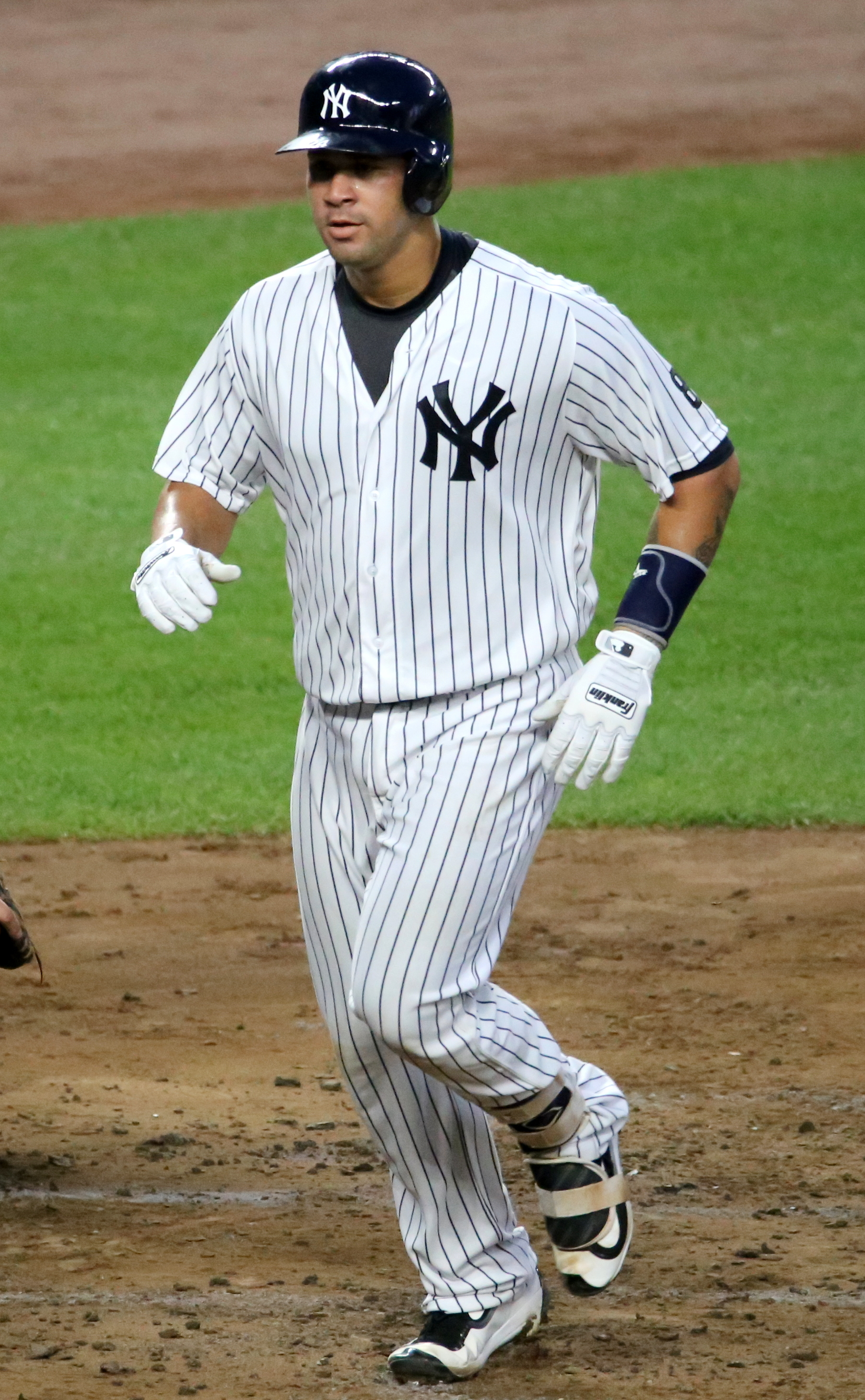
Sánchez in August 2016

Sánchez competed with Austin Romine to serve as the backup catcher to Brian McCann on the Yankees' Opening Day roster in 2016, but he began the season with Scranton/Wilkes-Barre. He was called up to the majors for one game in May, where he went 0-for-4. The Yankees again promoted Sánchez to the major leagues on August 3, and he recorded his first major league hit, a single off Mets' pitcher Hansel Robles, that same day. On August 10, Sánchez went 4-for-5, with his first major league home run and 3 singles. On August 16, Sánchez had his first two home run game, against the Toronto Blue Jays. On August 22, Sánchez was named AL Player of the Week, after hitting four home runs with a .523 average. Sánchez became the first player in MLB history with at least 11 home runs and 31 hits in his first 23 career games. On August 29, Sánchez was named AL Player of the Week for the second straight week, and on September 3 MLB named him AL Player of the Month and Rookie of the Month. On September 21, Sánchez hit his 18th and 19th home runs in his 45th game, making him the fastest player to reach 19 home runs in the modern era.

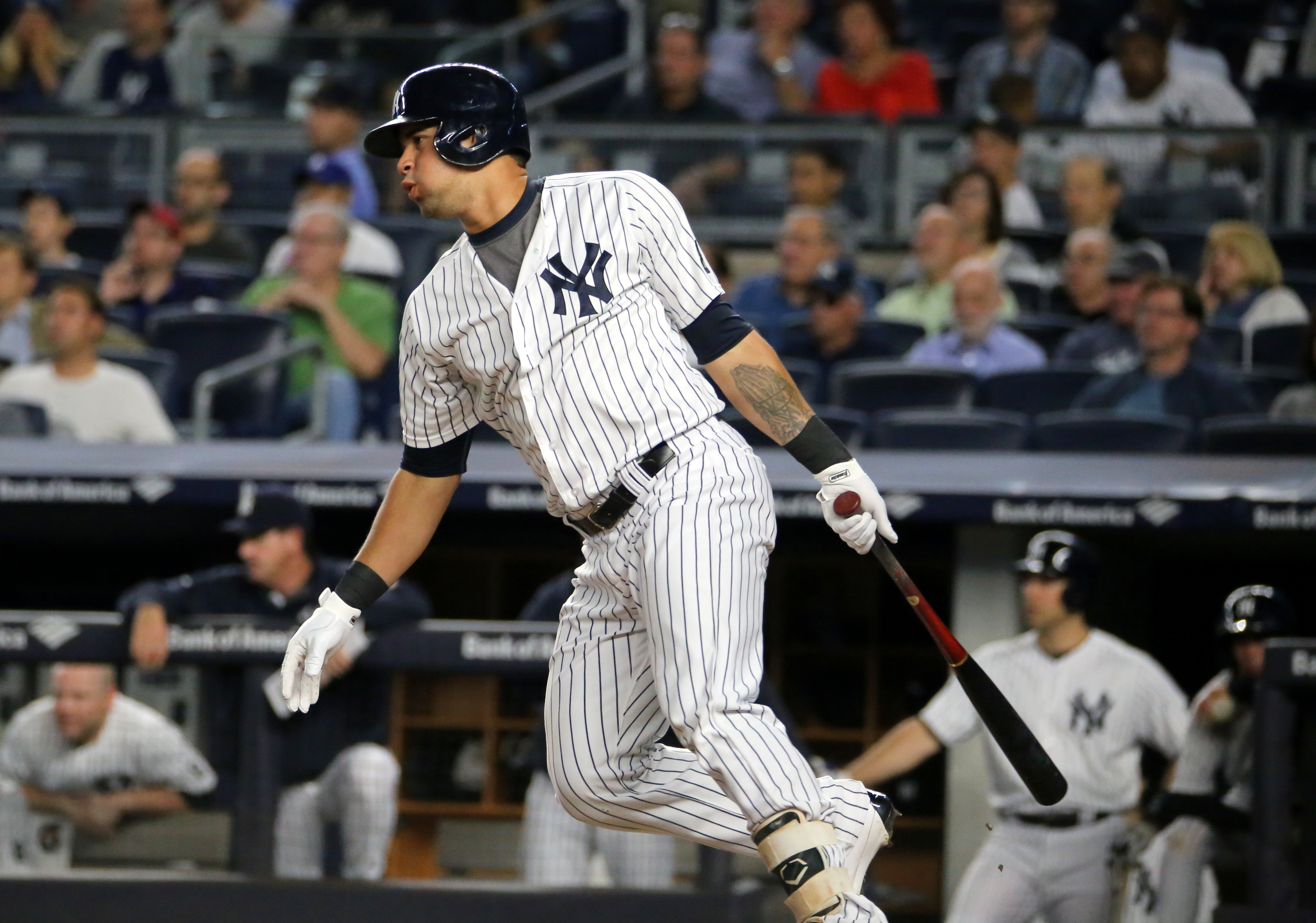
Sánchez in September 2016

For the 2016 season, Sánchez played in 53 games for the Yankees with a .299 batting average, 20 home runs, and 42 RBIs. On defense, in 2016 he had the best average pop time to second base (1.90 seconds) of all major league catchers. He finished second in the voting for AL Rookie of the Year, behind Michael Fulmer.

==== 2017 ====
On April 8, 2017, Sánchez left the game after straining his right brachialis muscle in the bicep and was placed on the 10-day disabled list. He returned to the Yankees on May 5 after missing 21 games. On June 10, Sánchez hit the hardest home run of his career, a 115.1-mph laser to left-center field against Mike Wright of the Baltimore Orioles. The following day, Sánchez hit the farthest home run of his career, a 450-foot shot off Kevin Gausman of the Orioles. Sánchez was named to the 2017 American League All-Star team, his first, as a reserve. He participated in the 2017 MLB Home Run Derby, upsetting Miami Marlins outfielder and future teammate Giancarlo Stanton 17–16 in the first round before losing to Minnesota Twins third baseman Miguel Sanó 11–10 in the second round. Prior to the competition, Sánchez engaged in a feud with Tampa Bay Rays first baseman Logan Morrison, who stated that Sánchez did not deserve an invitation to the Derby, having hit only 13 home runs so far compared to Morrison's 24. Sánchez responded by saying "It's not my fault he didn't get selected."

Sánchez played a key role in the Yankees' four-game sweep of the New York Mets by hitting three home runs and throwing out multiple runners trying to steal. On August 23, Sánchez hit two home runs against the Detroit Tigers; the first measured at 493 feet, the second-longest in the majors behind teammate Aaron Judge's 495-foot home run. On August 24, Sánchez hit a home run off of Tigers starter Michael Fulmer in the second inning; it was the fourth home run he had hit in the series and his 27th of the season. In his next at-bat, he was hit by a pitch from Fulmer, presumably in retribution for the home run. This served as a catalyst for a large brawl in which Sánchez threw punches at Tigers players. He was suspended for four games, which was later reduced to three games upon appeal.

On September 14, Sánchez hit his 31st home run of the season, breaking the record for most homers in a single season by a Yankees catcher, previously held by Yogi Berra (1952, 1956) and Jorge Posada (2003).

He finished the season batting .278/.345/.531 with 33 home runs, 90 RBIs, 20 doubles, 131 hits, 40 walks and 79 runs scored, and leading the majors in pull percentage (51.6%). On defense, in 2017 he had the best arm strength (87.8) and the third-best average pop time to second base (1.93 seconds) of all major league catchers, but tied for the major league lead in passed balls (16). In the postseason, he batted .208/.218/.415 with three home runs and eight RBIs as the Yankees lost in Game 7 of the ALCS to the Astros. At season's end, Sánchez received the Silver Slugger Award after the season as the best hitting catcher in the American League.

==== 2018 ====
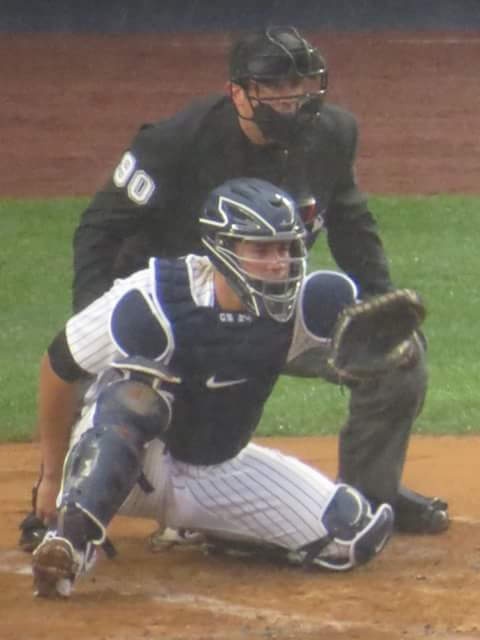
Sánchez catching in 2018

On April 26, Sánchez hit his first career walk-off, a three-run home run off of Minnesota Twins closer Fernando Rodney as the Yankees won 4–3.

On June 24, 2018, he injured his groin following an awkward landing at first base. He was placed on the disabled list, allowing backup catcher Austin Romine to fill his place and become the primary catcher. On July 23, after a game against the Tampa Bay Rays, Sanchez was criticized for lack of effort twice during the game. In the bottom of the first inning, a low pitch from Luis Severino bounced off Sanchez’s foot and rolled up the third base line. Sanchez jogged slowly to the ball, and Rays baserunner Jake Bauers took advantage of the lack of effort and scored after an errant throw from Sanchez. In the ninth inning, the Yankees were one run down with a chance to tie the game. Aaron Judge was at third, with Giancarlo Stanton at second, Aaron Hicks at first, and Sánchez up at bat. Sanchez hit a sharp ground ball to Daniel Robertson, who flipped it to Willy Adames, but Hicks hustled enough to be safe at second. Sánchez jogged slowly all the way to first, and Adames noticed, throwing to Bauers to get Sánchez out and end the game. Judge would have scored and tied the game but instead the Yankees lost to the Rays 6–7, due to Sánchez’s lack of hustle. On July 24, Sánchez went on the disabled list again due to re-aggravating the same groin.

Sánchez finished the 2018 season with a disappointing .186 batting average with 18 home runs and 53 RBIs in 89 games played. On defense, he led the major leagues in passed balls, with 18. During the 2018 off-season, Sánchez underwent shoulder surgery to remove debris from the AC joint.

==== 2019 ====
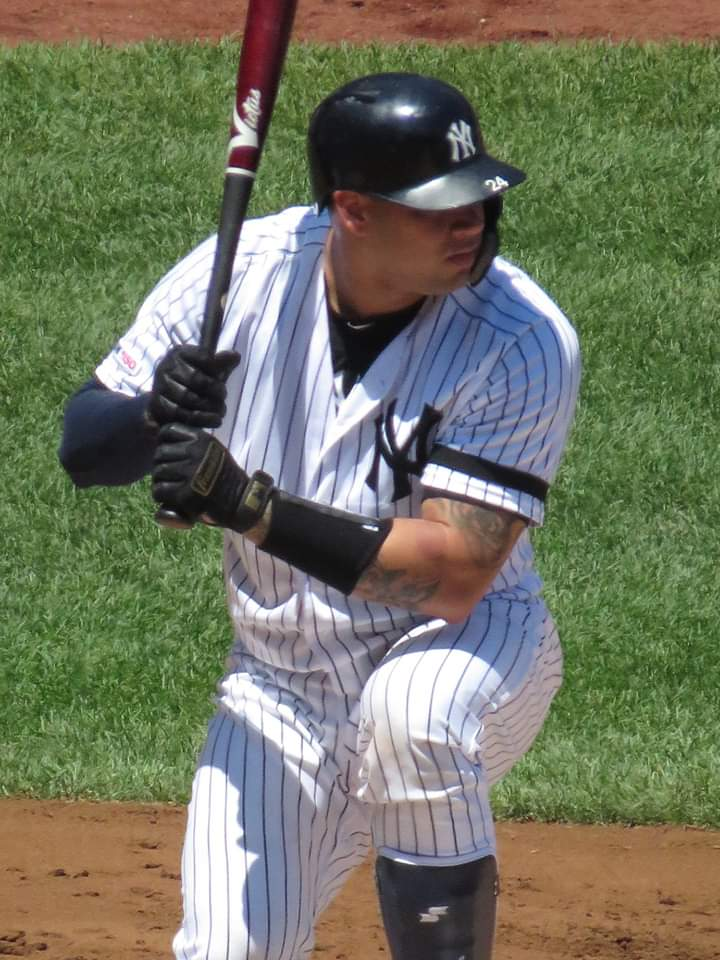
Sánchez batting in July 2019

On April 7, 2019, Sánchez hit 3 home runs in one game against the Baltimore Orioles. On April 27, 2019, Sánchez hit his first career grand slam against the San Francisco Giants.

On May 19, 2019, Sánchez hit his first career triple against the Tampa Bay Rays.

On August 23, 2019, Sánchez hit his 100th career home run against the Los Angeles Dodgers, making him the fastest catcher to hit 100 home runs and fastest player in American League history to hit 100 home runs.

On September 3, 2019, Sánchez broke his own franchise record by hitting two home runs (number 33 and 34), in a winning effort against the Texas Rangers. He now has the two highest single-season home run totals ever for a Yankees catcher, as well as becoming the second with multiple 30-homer years, joining Yogi Berra.

In 2019, Sanchez dropped his passed balls from the league lead of 18 in 2018 to 7. However on defense he led all major league catchers in errors committed, with 15.

==== 2020 ====
Sanchez struggled during the Covid-shortened 2020 season. In 49 games, he batted .147 with 10 home runs and 24 RBIs. By September, he was benched by manager Aaron Boone and relegated to the backup role. On defense, in 2020 he led all major league catchers in errors, with six.

==== 2021 ====
On April 3, 2021, during a game against the Toronto Blue Jays, Sanchez became the tenth Yankees player and second Yankees catcher in franchise history to hit a home run in the first two games of the season, behind Elston Howard who achieved the feat in 1963, his MVP year.

Sanchez's struggles continued in 2021, as he hit .204, but his 23 home runs and 54 RBIs were both improvements from 2020. He had one at-bat in the Wild Card Game against Boston. He was demoted to backup in April amid his struggles, and again in August.

=== Minnesota Twins (2022) ===
On March 13, 2022, the Yankees traded Sánchez along with Gio Urshela to the Minnesota Twins in exchange for Josh Donaldson, Isiah Kiner-Falefa, and Ben Rortvedt. In 128 games, he batted .205 with 16 home runs and 61 RBIs.

=== San Francisco Giants (2023) ===
On March 31, 2023, Sánchez signed a minor league contract with the San Francisco Giants organization. He played in 16 games for the Triple-A Sacramento River Cats, hitting .164/.319/.182 with no home runs and 8 RBIs. On May 2, Sánchez opted out of his contract and became a free agent.

=== New York Mets (2023) ===
On May 9, 2023, Sánchez signed a minor league contract with the New York Mets organization. He played in 8 games for the Triple-A Syracuse Mets, hitting .308/.514/.500 with 1 home run and 5 RBIs. On May 19, Sánchez was selected to the active roster. On May 21, Sánchez made his Mets debut in a game against the Cleveland Guardians. He appeared in 3 games for the Mets, going 1-for-6 with an RBI before he was designated for assignment on May 25.

=== San Diego Padres (2023) ===
On May 29, 2023, Sánchez was claimed off waivers by the San Diego Padres. In 72 games for San Diego, he batted .218/.292/.500 with 19 home runs and 46 RBIs. On September 6, Sánchez suffered a fractured right wrist after being hit by a pitch from Philadelphia Phillies pitcher Jeff Hoffman. He was placed on the 60–day injured list on September 11, officially ending his season. He became a free agent following the 2023 season.

=== Milwaukee Brewers (2024) ===
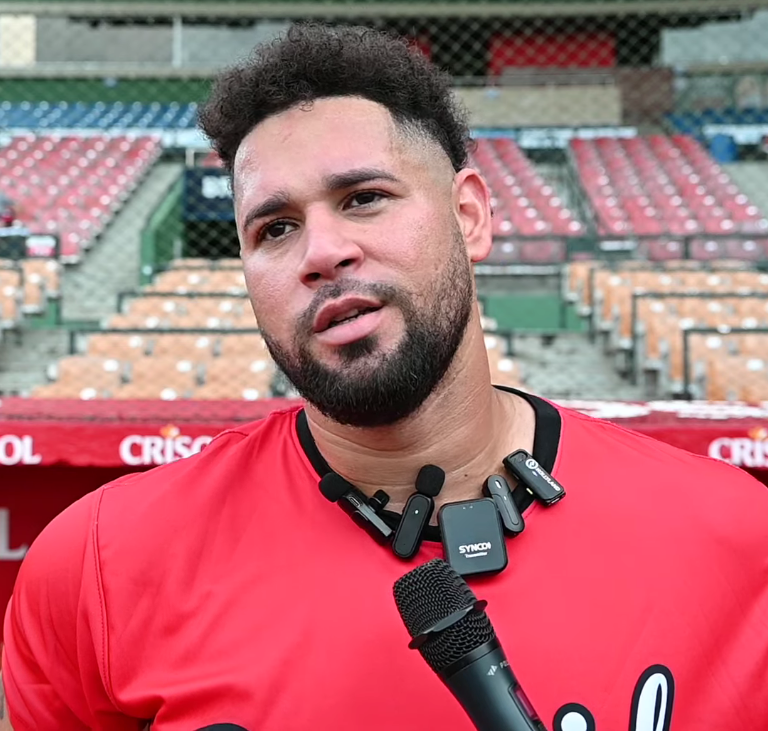
Sánchez with the Leones del Escogido in 2024

On February 21, 2024, Sánchez signed a one-year, $3 million contract with the Milwaukee Brewers that contained incentives that would raise the total to $7 million. The contract was adjusted after his physical indicated some issues with his right wrist. Sánchez played in 89 games in 2024, hitting .220 with 11 home runs and 37 RBI, while hitting .286 in the postseason. On November 2, the Brewers declined the 2025 option on his contract, making him a free agent.

=== Baltimore Orioles (2025) ===
On December 10, 2024, Sánchez signed a one–year, $8.5 million contract with the Baltimore Orioles. He began the year as Adley Rutschman's primary backup, and batted .231 with five home runs and 24 RBI over his first 29 games with the team. On July 8, 2025, manager Tony Mansolino announced that Sánchez would miss 8-to-10 weeks due to a right knee sprain. In 29 appearances on the year for Baltimore, he had batted .231/.297/.418 with five home runs and 24 RBI.

=== Milwaukee Brewers (2026) ===
On February 14, 2026, Sánchez returned to the Milwaukee Brewers on a one-year, $1.75 million contract. He hit his 200th career home run on August 30, becoming just the 21st catcher with at least 50 percent of games played at the position to hit 200 home runs. Sanchez was the Brewers backup catcher behind William Contreras throughout the whole 2026 season. He was part of the 2026 postseason roster that won the 2026 World Series.

== Dominican career ==
Sánchez played winter ball in the Dominican Professional Baseball League from 2011–13 with the Leones del Escogido and with the Toros del Este in 2013–14 and 2020–21. On March 21, 2023, Sánchez signed a contract to play with Escogido but did not appear in a game that season.

== Personal life ==
Sánchez and his wife, Sahaira, have two daughters. He credits his daughter's birth for his transformation from a player "going through the motions" early in his professional career, to a player lauded for his work ethic.
