= 2017 Major League Baseball postseason =

2017 Major League Baseball playoffs

Tournament details
- Dates: October 3 – November 1, 2017
- Teams: 10

Final positions
- Champions: Houston Astros (1st title)
- Runners-up: Los Angeles Dodgers

Tournament statistics
- Most HRs: Jose Altuve (HOU) (7)
- Most SBs: Three tied (2)
- Most Ks (as pitcher): Justin Verlander (HOU) (38)

Awards
- MVP: George Springer (HOU)

The 2017 Major League Baseball postseason was the playoff tournament of Major League Baseball for the 2017 season. The winners of the Division Series would move on to the League Championship Series to determine the pennant winners that face each other in the World Series. This was the first edition of the postseason in which home field advantage in the World Series was awarded to the team with the better regular season record, rather than the winner of the All-Star Game.

In the American League, the Cleveland Indians and Boston Red Sox returned for the second year in a row, the Houston Astros and New York Yankees returned for the second time in three years, and the Minnesota Twins made their first appearance since 2010. This was the first of eight straight postseason appearances for the Astros from 2017 to 2024. It was also the first of six consecutive appearances for the Yankees from 2017 to 2022.

In the National League, the Washington Nationals returned for the fourth time in six years, the Los Angeles Dodgers made their fifth straight appearance, the Chicago Cubs made their third straight appearance, the Arizona Diamondbacks made their first appearance since 2011, and the Colorado Rockies returned for the first time since 2009. This was the first postseason since 2003 to feature three 100-win teams.

The postseason began on October 3, and ended on November 1, with the Astros defeating the Dodgers in seven games in the 2017 World Series. It was the Astros' first title in franchise history.

== Playoff seeds ==
After the end of the 2016 season, MLB changed the format of the World Series. Instead of home field advantage being awarded to the team from the league that won the Major League Baseball All-Star Game, home field advantage in the World Series was determined by the team with the better regular season record.

American League Teams National League Teams

The following teams qualified for the postseason:

=== American League ===
1. Cleveland Indians – 102–60, AL Central champions
2. Houston Astros – 101–61, AL West champions
3. Boston Red Sox – 93–69, AL East champions
4. New York Yankees – 91–71
5. Minnesota Twins – 85–77

=== National League ===
1. Los Angeles Dodgers – 104–58, NL West champions
2. Washington Nationals – 97–65, NL East champions
3. Chicago Cubs – 92–70, NL Central champions
4. Arizona Diamondbacks – 93–69
5. Colorado Rockies – 87–75

== Playoff bracket ==
Wild Card Games (ALWC, NLWC)
4	NY Yankees	1
5	Minnesota	0
4	Arizona	1
5	Colorado	0

Division Series (ALDS, NLDS)
1	Cleveland	2
4	NY Yankees	3
American League
2	Houston	3
3	Boston	1
1	LA Dodgers	3
4	Arizona	0
National League
2	Washington	2
3	Chicago Cubs	3

League Championship Series (ALCS, NLCS)
4	NY Yankees	3
2	Houston	4
1	LA Dodgers	4
3	Chicago Cubs	1

World Series
AL2	Houston	4
NL1	LA Dodgers	3

== American League Wild Card ==
=== (4) New York Yankees vs. (5) Minnesota Twins ===
October 3, 2017 8:10 pm (EDT) at Yankee Stadium in Bronx, New York, 62 °F (17 °C), clear
Team	1	2	3	4	5	6	7	8	9	R	H	E
Minnesota	3	0	1	0	0	0	0	0	0	4	9	1
New York	3	1	1	2	0	0	1	0	X	8	9	0
WP: David Robertson (1–0) LP: José Berríos (0–1); Home runs: MIN: Brian Dozier (1), Eddie Rosario (1); NYY: Didi Gregorius (1), Brett Gardner (1), Aaron Judge (1); Attendance: 49,280; Boxscore

This was the fifth postseason meeting between the Yankees and Twins (2003, 2004, 2009, 2010). The Yankees once again defeated the Twins to advance to the ALDS for the first time since 2012.

Both teams would meet once more in the ALDS in 2019, which the Yankees won in a sweep.

== National League Wild Card ==
=== (4) Arizona Diamondbacks vs. (5) Colorado Rockies ===
October 4, 2017 5:08 pm (MST) at Chase Field in Phoenix, Arizona, 76 °F (24 °C), roof closed
Team	1	2	3	4	5	6	7	8	9	R	H	E
Colorado	0	0	0	4	0	0	1	2	1	8	13	0
Arizona	3	1	2	0	0	0	2	3	X	11	17	0
WP: Andrew Chafin (1–0) LP: Jon Gray (0–1); Home runs: COL: Nolan Arenado (1), Trevor Story (1); ARI: Daniel Descalso (1), Paul Goldschmidt (1); Attendance: 48,803; Boxscore

This was the second postseason meeting between the Rockies and Diamondbacks. They previously met in the NLCS in 2007, which the Rockies won in a sweep before falling in the World Series. Despite a late rally by the Rockies, the Diamondbacks prevailed in an offensive slugfest by an 11-8 score and advanced to the NLDS for the first time since 2011.

== American League Division Series ==
=== (1) Cleveland Indians vs. (4) New York Yankees ===
New York won the series, 3–2.

Game	Date	Score	Location	Time	Attendance
1	October 5	New York Yankees – 0, Cleveland Indians – 4	Progressive Field	3:26	37,612
2	October 6	New York Yankees – 8, Cleveland Indians – 9 (13)	Progressive Field	5:08	37,681
3	October 8	Cleveland Indians – 0, New York Yankees – 1	Yankee Stadium	3:17	48,614
4	October 9	Cleveland Indians – 3, New York Yankees – 7	Yankee Stadium	3:47	47,316
5	October 11	New York Yankees – 5, Cleveland Indians – 2	Progressive Field	3:38	37,802

This was the fourth postseason meeting between the Indians and Yankees (1997, 1998, 2007). The Yankees overcame a two-games-to-none series deficit to upset the defending American League champion Indians in five games, advancing to the ALCS for the fourth time in nine years.

Trevor Bauer and the Indians’ bullpen shut out the Yankees in Game 1. Game 2 was an offensive grind between both teams that went into extra innings, and once again the Indians prevailed as Yan Gomes batted in Austin Jackson in the bottom of the thirteenth to take a 2–0 series lead headed to the Bronx. Masahiro Tanaka outdueled Andrew Miller in a pitchers duel in Game 3 as the Yankees got on the board in the series. In Game 4, the Yankees jumped out to a big lead early and held it to send the series back to Cleveland for a decisive fifth game. Didi Gregorius hit two home runs in a 5-2 Yankees win in Game 5 to close out the series.

Both teams would meet again in the Wild Card round in 2020, the ALDS in 2022, and the ALCS in 2024, with all three being won by the Yankees.

=== (2) Houston Astros vs. (3) Boston Red Sox ===
Houston won the series, 3–1.

Game	Date	Score	Location	Time	Attendance
1	October 5	Boston Red Sox – 2, Houston Astros – 8	Minute Maid Park	3:26	43,102
2	October 6	Boston Red Sox – 2, Houston Astros – 8	Minute Maid Park	4:00	43,410
3	October 8	Houston Astros – 3, Boston Red Sox – 10	Fenway Park	3:38	38,010
4	October 9	Houston Astros – 5, Boston Red Sox – 4	Fenway Park	4:07	37,305

This was the first postseason meeting between the Astros and Red Sox. The Astros defeated the Red Sox in four games to advance to their first ever ALCS and first LCS overall since 2005.

Justin Verlander pitched six solid innings as the Astros blew out the Red Sox in Game 1. Carlos Correa and George Springer ignited a spark in the Astros’ offense in Game 2 as they blew out the Red Sox again to take a 2–0 series lead headed to Fenway Park. The Red Sox blew out the Astros in Game 3 to get on the board in the series. In Game 4, Verlander outdueled Chris Sale again as the Astros won by one run to close out the series.

Both teams would meet again in the ALCS in 2018 and 2021, with the Red Sox winning the former en route to a World Series title, and the Astros winning the latter before falling in the World Series.

== National League Division Series ==
=== (1) Los Angeles Dodgers vs. (4) Arizona Diamondbacks ===
Los Angeles won the series, 3–0.

Game	Date	Score	Location	Time	Attendance
1	October 6	Arizona Diamondbacks – 5, Los Angeles Dodgers – 9	Dodger Stadium	3:37	54,707
2	October 7	Arizona Diamondbacks – 5, Los Angeles Dodgers – 8	Dodger Stadium	3:48	54,726
3	October 9	Los Angeles Dodgers – 3, Arizona Diamondbacks – 1	Chase Field	3:36	48,641

This was the first postseason meeting in the history of the Diamondbacks–Dodgers rivalry, also known as the I-10 Rivalry. The Dodgers swept the Diamondbacks to advance to the NLCS for the second year in a row and fifth time in nine years.

The Dodgers took Game 1 despite four different players on the Diamondbacks hitting home runs - A. J. Pollock, J. D. Martinez, Ketel Marte, and Jeff Mathis. Game 2 was more of the same - the Dodgers once again defeated the D-Backs in an offensive shootout despite not hitting any home runs to take a 2–0 series lead headed to Phoenix. In Game 3, Yu Darvish outdueled Zack Greinke as the Dodgers won 3-1 to finish the sweep.

Both teams would meet again in the NLDS in 2023, where the Diamondbacks, as part of a Cinderella run as the NL’s sixth seed, swept the Dodgers in one of the biggest upsets in postseason history before coming up short in the World Series.

=== (2) Washington Nationals vs. (3) Chicago Cubs ===
Chicago won the series, 3–2.

Game	Date	Score	Location	Time	Attendance
1	October 6	Chicago Cubs – 3, Washington Nationals – 0	Nationals Park	3:02	43,898
2	October 7	Chicago Cubs – 3, Washington Nationals – 6	Nationals Park	3:06	43,860
3	October 9	Washington Nationals – 1, Chicago Cubs – 2	Wrigley Field	3:09	42,445
4	October 11†	Washington Nationals – 5, Chicago Cubs – 0	Wrigley Field	3:57	42,264
5	October 12	Chicago Cubs – 9, Washington Nationals – 8	Nationals Park	4:37	43,849

†:Originally scheduled for Tuesday, October 10, but postponed due to weather.

The Cubs narrowly defeated the Nationals in five games to return to the NLCS for the third year in a row.

Kyle Hendricks outdueled Stephen Strasburg as the Cubs shut out the Nationals in Game 1. The Nationals evened the series in Game 2 as Anthony Rendon, Bryce Harper, and Ryan Zimmerman all homered for the Nats. In Chicago for Game 3, it was another pitchers duel between both teams’ bullpens, and the Cubs would prevail to regain the series lead. Then, in Game 4, Strasburg pitched seven shutout innings in a 5-0 Nationals win to send the series back to the nation’s capital. The Cubs ultimately prevailed in an offensive shootout in Game 5 to close out the series.

The Nationals would earn redemption in 2019, as they ran the table and won the World Series over the Houston Astros in seven games as the fourth seed in the National League.

== American League Championship Series ==
=== (2) Houston Astros vs. (4) New York Yankees ===
Houston won the series, 4–3.

Game	Date	Score	Location	Time	Attendance
1	October 13	New York Yankees – 1, Houston Astros – 2	Minute Maid Park	3:20	43,116
2	October 14	New York Yankees – 1, Houston Astros – 2	Minute Maid Park	3:00	43,193
3	October 16	Houston Astros – 1, New York Yankees – 8	Yankee Stadium	3:25	49,373
4	October 17	Houston Astros – 4, New York Yankees – 6	Yankee Stadium	3:37	48,804
5	October 18	Houston Astros – 0, New York Yankees – 5	Yankee Stadium	3:18	49,647
6	October 20	New York Yankees – 1, Houston Astros – 7	Minute Maid Park	3:23	43,179
7	October 21	New York Yankees – 0, Houston Astros – 4	Minute Maid Park	3:09	43,201

This was the second postseason meeting between the Yankees and Astros. In an ALCS where neither team won a road game, the Astros defeated the Yankees in seven games to advance to the World Series for the first time since 2005 (in the process denying a rematch of the 1981 World Series between the Yankees and Dodgers).

Ken Giles held off a late rally by the Yankees in the ninth to win Game 1 for the Astros. In Game 2, Justin Verlander pitched a five-hit complete game as the Astros won by a 2–1 score again to go up 2–0 in the series headed to the Bronx. Verlander was the last pitcher to throw a complete game in the postseason until Yoshinobu Yamamoto did so in 2025. There, the Yankees responded. In Game 3, CC Sabathia pitched six innings of shutout ball as the Yankees blew out the Astros to get on the board in the series. In Game 4, the Astros held a 4–0 lead after the top of the seventh, but the Yankees scored six unanswered runs to win and even the series. Masahiro Tanaka pitched seven shutout innings in Game 5 as the Yankees won 5–0 to go up 3–2 in the series headed back to Houston. In Game 6, Verlander threw seven shutout innings in a blowout win for the Astros. Charlie Morton and Lance McCullers Jr. helped shut out the Yankees in Game 7 to clinch the pennant for the Astros.

The Astros returned to the ALCS the next year, but they fell in five games to the eventual World Series champion Boston Red Sox. Both the Astros and Yankees would meet again in the ALCS in 2019 and 2022, with both being won by the Astros. The Yankees would eventually win the pennant again in 2024 over the now-Cleveland Guardians in five games before falling in the World Series.

== National League Championship Series ==
=== (1) Los Angeles Dodgers vs. (3) Chicago Cubs ===
Los Angeles won the series, 4–1.

Game	Date	Score	Location	Time	Attendance
1	October 14	Chicago Cubs – 2, Los Angeles Dodgers – 5	Dodger Stadium	3:24	54,289
2	October 15	Chicago Cubs – 1, Los Angeles Dodgers – 4	Dodger Stadium	3:20	54,479
3	October 17	Los Angeles Dodgers – 6, Chicago Cubs – 1	Wrigley Field	3:39	41,871
4	October 18	Los Angeles Dodgers – 2, Chicago Cubs – 3	Wrigley Field	3:15	42,195
5	October 19	Los Angeles Dodgers – 11, Chicago Cubs – 1	Wrigley Field	3:06	42,735

This was the third postseason meeting between the Dodgers and Cubs, and a rematch of the previous year's NLCS. The Dodgers defeated the defending World Series champion Cubs in five games to return to the World Series for the first time since 1988.

In Game 1, the Dodgers scored five unanswered runs across the fifth, sixth and seventh innings as they overcame an early 2–0 Cubs lead to win. In Game 2, the Dodgers prevailed off a walk-off three-run home run from Justin Turner in the bottom of the ninth. Turner's three-run home run was the Dodgers' first walk-off homer in the postseason since Kirk Gibson's two-run home run in Game 1 of the 1988 World Series. When the series shifted to Chicago, Yu Darvish struck out seven in 6 1/3 innings of Game 3 as the Dodgers won 6–1 to take a commanding three games to none series lead. In Game 4, behind Javier Báez’s two home runs, the Cubs avoided a sweep. However, the defending champions were ultimately eliminated in a blowout loss in Game 5. This was the third straight season in which the National League pennant was won at Wrigley Field.

The Dodgers would win the pennant again the next year over the Milwaukee Brewers in seven games before falling in the World Series again.

As of 2026, this is the last postseason appearance outside of the divisional round for the Cubs.

== 2017 World Series ==
=== (AL2) Houston Astros vs. (NL1) Los Angeles Dodgers ===
Houston won the series, 4–3.

Game	Date	Score	Location	Time	Attendance
1	October 24	Houston Astros – 1, Los Angeles Dodgers – 3	Dodger Stadium	2:28	54,253
2	October 25	Houston Astros – 7, Los Angeles Dodgers – 6 (11)	Dodger Stadium	4:19	54,293
3	October 27	Los Angeles Dodgers – 3, Houston Astros – 5	Minute Maid Park	3:46	43,282
4	October 28	Los Angeles Dodgers – 6, Houston Astros – 2	Minute Maid Park	3:06	43,322
5	October 29	Los Angeles Dodgers – 12, Houston Astros – 13 (10)	Minute Maid Park	5:17	43,300
6	October 31	Houston Astros – 1, Los Angeles Dodgers – 3	Dodger Stadium	3:22	54,128
7	November 1	Houston Astros – 5, Los Angeles Dodgers – 1	Dodger Stadium	3:37	54,124

This was the second postseason meeting between the Dodgers and Astros. They had previously met in the NLDS in 1981, which the Dodgers won in five games en route to a World Series title. The Astros defeated the Dodgers in seven games to capture their first World Series title in franchise history, becoming the first team from Texas to accomplish such a feat.

Clayton Kershaw pitched seven solid innings as the Dodgers took Game 1, which was the shortest World Series game since Game 4 of the 1992 World Series at 2 hours and 28 minutes. Game 2 was an eleven-inning slugfest which the Astros won 7–6, as both teams had four different players hit home runs. Game 2 was the first World Series game won by the Astros in franchise history. When the series moved to Houston, a home run by Yuli Gurriel put the Astros in the lead for good as they won by two runs in Game 3 to take the series lead. Game 3 was marred by controversy, as Gurriel made a racially insensitive gesture in the dugout at Los Angeles pitcher Yu Darvish after his home run. He stretched the sides of his eyes and mouthing the Spanish word chinito, which translates to "little Chinese Boy"; Darvish is from Japan. Gurriel apologized, and said that anyone from Asia is called a chino in Cuba, although he acknowledged knowing that the term was offensive in Japan from having played there. As a result, Rob Manfred, the Commissioner of Baseball, suspended Gurriel for the first five games of the 2018 Major League Baseball season without pay, but allowed him to continue playing in the World Series. The Dodgers rallied late in Game 4 by scoring six runs in two of the final three innings to even the series at two.

The series was notable for its Game 5, which saw a record six game-tying home runs and 25 combined runs scored. The six game-tying home runs in the series to this point is the most for any World Series on record. This World Series set a new record for most players to hit a home run (14 to date in the World Series). With the teams combining to score 25 runs throughout the game, this was the highest scoring World Series game since the Florida Marlins defeated the Cleveland Indians 14–11 in Game 3 of the 1997 World Series.

When the series shifted back to Los Angeles, Tony Watson defeated Justin Verlander in a pitchers' duel as the Dodgers won 3–1 in Game 6 to force a seventh game. However, George Springer helped carry the Astros to victory in Game 7 with his fifth home run of the series.

This was the first championship won by a Houston-based team since 1995, when the NBA’s Houston Rockets repeated as NBA champions. As of 2026, the 2017 Astros remain the most recent American League team to win a World Series Game 7, as the next two Fall Classics that went the full seven games (2019, 2025) were won by the National League. The Astros' victory became controversial when MLB determined in 2019 that they had been illegally using technology to steal signs from opposing teams during their 2017 and 2018 seasons. As a result, the Astros were fined $5 million and docked several top draft picks, while Astros manager A. J. Hinch and general manager Jeff Luhnow were suspended for one year; both were subsequently fired. However, Commissioner of Baseball Rob Manfred opted against punishing any of the players involved or revoking the Astros' World Series title. ESPN writer Sam Miller opined that although competitive and memorable, the 2017 World Series "produced a champion we all regret having felt happy for".

The Astros returned to the World Series two years later after their illegal sign stealing scheme was ended, but were upset by the Washington Nationals in seven games after being eight outs away from the championship in Game 7. However, the Astros would eventually earn redemption for the scandal in 2022, as they defeated the Philadelphia Phillies in six games for their most recent championship.

The Dodgers returned to the World Series the next year, but lost to the Boston Red Sox in five games, who were later implicated in the same illegal sign-stealing scandal as the Astros. They would eventually end their championship drought in 2020 against the Tampa Bay Rays in six games.

== Broadcasting ==
This was fourth year of eight-year U.S. TV contracts with ESPN, Fox Sports, and TBS. ESPN aired the American League Wild Card Game, Fox Sports 1 and MLB Network split the American League Division Series, and the Fox broadcast network and Fox Sports 1 split the American League Championship Series. TBS had the National League Wild Card Game, Division Series, and Championship Series, with sister network TNT used as an overflow channel. The World Series then aired on the Fox broadcast network for the eighteenth consecutive year.
