= Aaron Hicks =

American baseball player (born 1989)

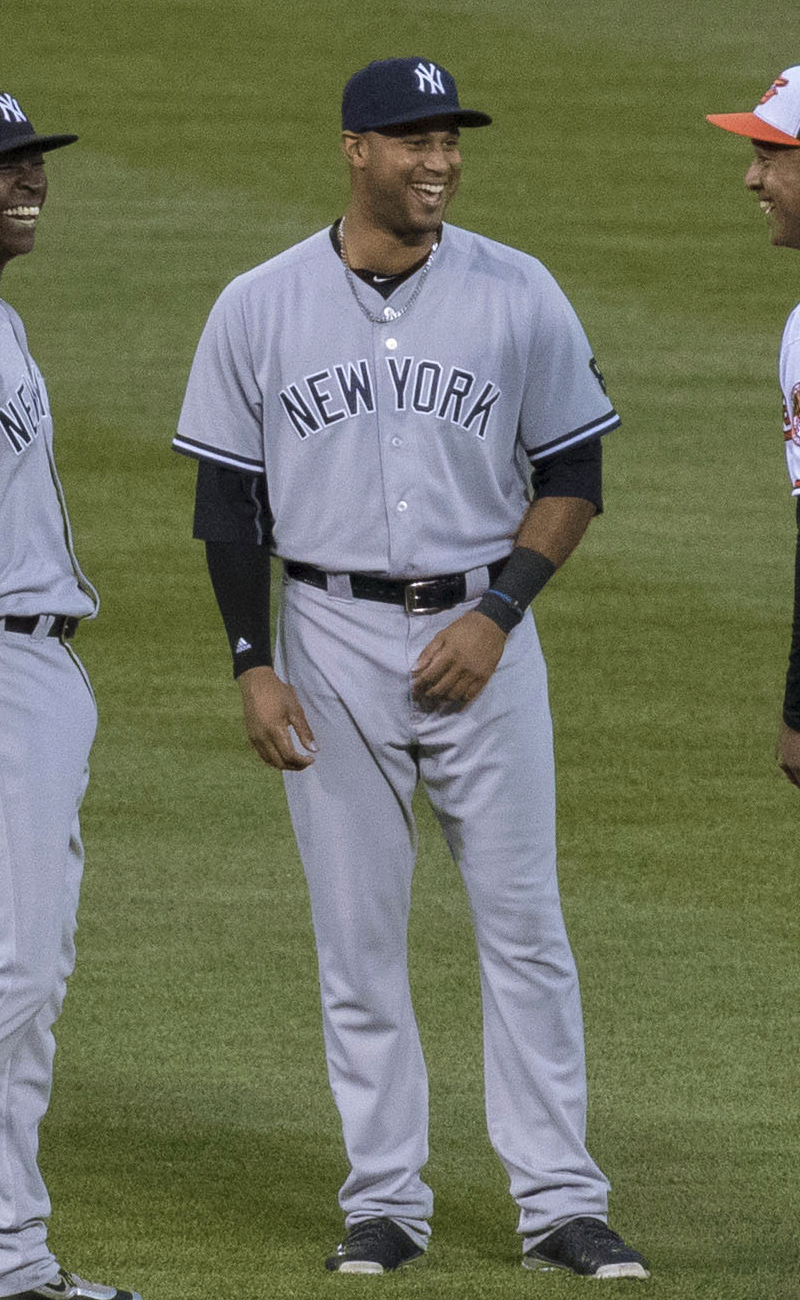
- Hicks with the New York Yankees in 2016
- Outfielder
- Born: October 2, 1989 (age 37); Los Angeles, California, U.S.
- Batted: Switch Threw: Right

MLB debut
- April 1, 2013, for the Minnesota Twins

Last MLB appearance
- April 28, 2024, for the Los Angeles Angels

MLB statistics
- Batting average: .231
- Home runs: 109
- Runs batted in: 392
- Stats at Baseball Reference

Teams
- Minnesota Twins (2013–2015); New York Yankees (2016–2023); Baltimore Orioles (2023); Los Angeles Angels (2024)

Aaron Michael Hicks (born October 2, 1989) is an American former professional baseball outfielder. He played in Major League Baseball (MLB) for the Minnesota Twins, New York Yankees, Baltimore Orioles, and Los Angeles Angels.

Hicks was drafted by the Twins in the first round of the 2008 MLB draft. He made his MLB debut in 2013 with the Twins and was traded to the Yankees after the 2015 season. In 2023, the Yankees released Hicks, and he signed with the Baltimore Orioles.

== Early life ==
Aaron Michael Hicks was born October 2, 1989 in the San Pedro neighborhood of Los Angeles, to Joe and Jody Hicks. Hicks grew up in San Pedro, California and attended Woodrow Wilson Classical High School, where he was a star baseball player. He also attended Major League Baseball's (MLB) Urban Youth Academy, which is designed to promote baseball in urban areas.

== Career ==
=== Minor leagues ===
A switch hitter, Hicks was drafted by Minnesota Twins in the first round of the 2008 MLB draft out of Wilson Classical High School in Long Beach, California. In his first professional season, Hicks was tabbed a 2008 Baseball America Rookie All-Star and named the top prospect in the Twins' organization. He batted .318 with four home runs, 27 runs batted in, twelve stolen bases and 28 walks for the Gulf Coast League Twins to earn a Gulf Coast League postseason All-Star nod. In 2009, Hicks batted .251 with four home runs, 29 RBIs, ten steals and 40 walks for the Beloit Snappers. He returned to Beloit in 2010 and hit .279 with eight home runs.

Playing for the Fort Myers Miracle in 2011, he hit .242 with five home runs. In 2012, he hit .286 with 13 home runs for the New Britain Rock Cats. After being sent down from the major leagues in August, for the 2013 season in Triple–A he batted .222 with the Rochester Red Wings.

Hicks was ranked as a top 100 prospect by Baseball America four times.

=== Minnesota Twins (2013–2015) ===
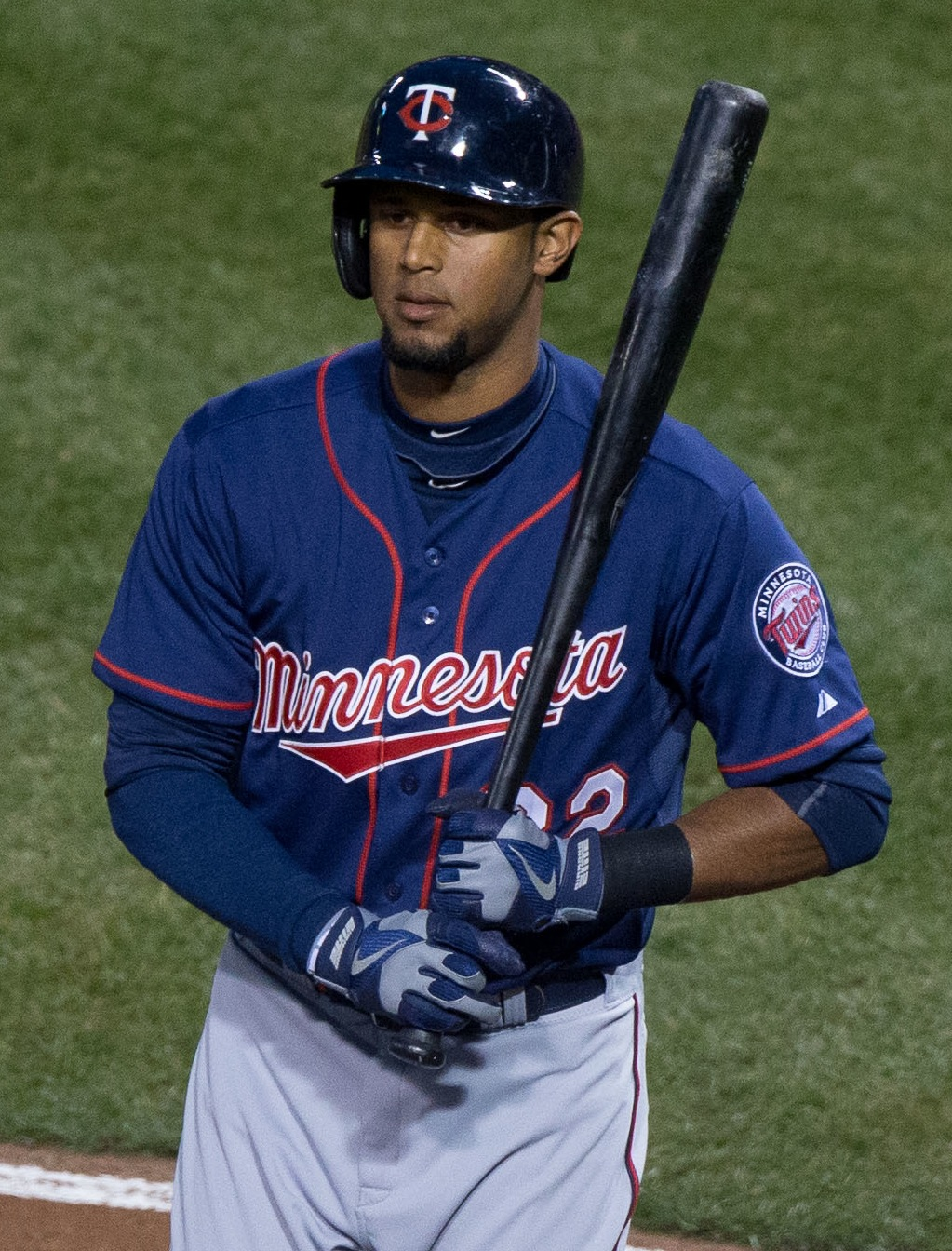
Hicks with the Minnesota Twins in 2013

On March 24, 2013, it was announced that Hicks would be the starting center fielder for the Minnesota Twins. He chose his new number to honor Dave Winfield, who wore 32 for the Twins. He was sent down to AAA on August 1, and was not called back up in 2013.

In 2013, Hicks batted .192 in 281 at bats, with a .259 on-base percentage. Jim Souhan of the Star Tribune wrote that he became: "the latest unpaid spokesman for the Public Service Announcement that reminds baseball fans not to believe anything they see in spring training."

Despite his underwhelming 2013 performance, Hicks was named the starting center fielder for the 2014 season. Hicks' 2014 season did not show improvement at the plate. Through 47 games, Hicks hit .201 and was demoted to Double A on June 9.

Hicks gave up switch hitting during the 2014 season due to a lack of confidence in his ability to bat left-handed. However, he went back to switch hitting less than a month later.

For the 2015 season, Hicks hit .256 with 11 home runs and 33 RBIs in 97 games.

=== New York Yankees (2016–2023) ===
==== 2016–2018 ====
On November 11, 2015, the Twins traded Hicks to the New York Yankees for John Ryan Murphy. The Yankees targeted Hicks due to his athleticism, strong throwing arm, and ability to hit left-handed pitching.

During a game against the Oakland Athletics on April 20, 2016, Hicks made a throw that nabbed Danny Valencia at home plate for an out. The throw was recorded at 105.5 miles per hour (169.8 km/h), the fastest throwing speed recorded by Statcast. In 123 games of 2016, Hicks batted .217 with eight home runs and 31 RBI.

By early June 2017, in just 154 at bats, Hicks had already hit more home runs (10) and RBIs (34) than he had hit in the entire 2016 season. As of June 9, he ranked seventh in the majors in both OBP and OPS. On April 13, 2017, Hicks hit two home runs; one batting left handed and one batting right handed. He drove in all three runs as the Yankees won 3–2 over the Tampa Bay Rays. Hicks suffered an oblique injury in late June, causing him to go on the 10-day disabled list. On September 3, Hicks was again placed on the 10-day disabled list due to a left oblique injury. He returned from the DL on September 26. Hicks ended the season with 15 home runs, 52 RBIs, and a .266 average, all career highs.

On March 30, 2018, the Yankees placed Hicks on the 10-day disabled list due to a strained right intercostal muscle. He was reinstated from the DL on April 12 and hit an inside-the-park home run against the Detroit Tigers on the next day. Hicks would hit another inside-the-park-home run against the Kansas City Royals on May 19, becoming the first Yankee since Mickey Mantle in 1958 to hit two inside-the-park-home runs in a single season. On July 1, Hicks hit three home runs in one game against the Boston Red Sox. Hicks ended the season with 27 home runs, 79 RBIs, and 119 hits, all career highs.

==== 2019–2023 ====
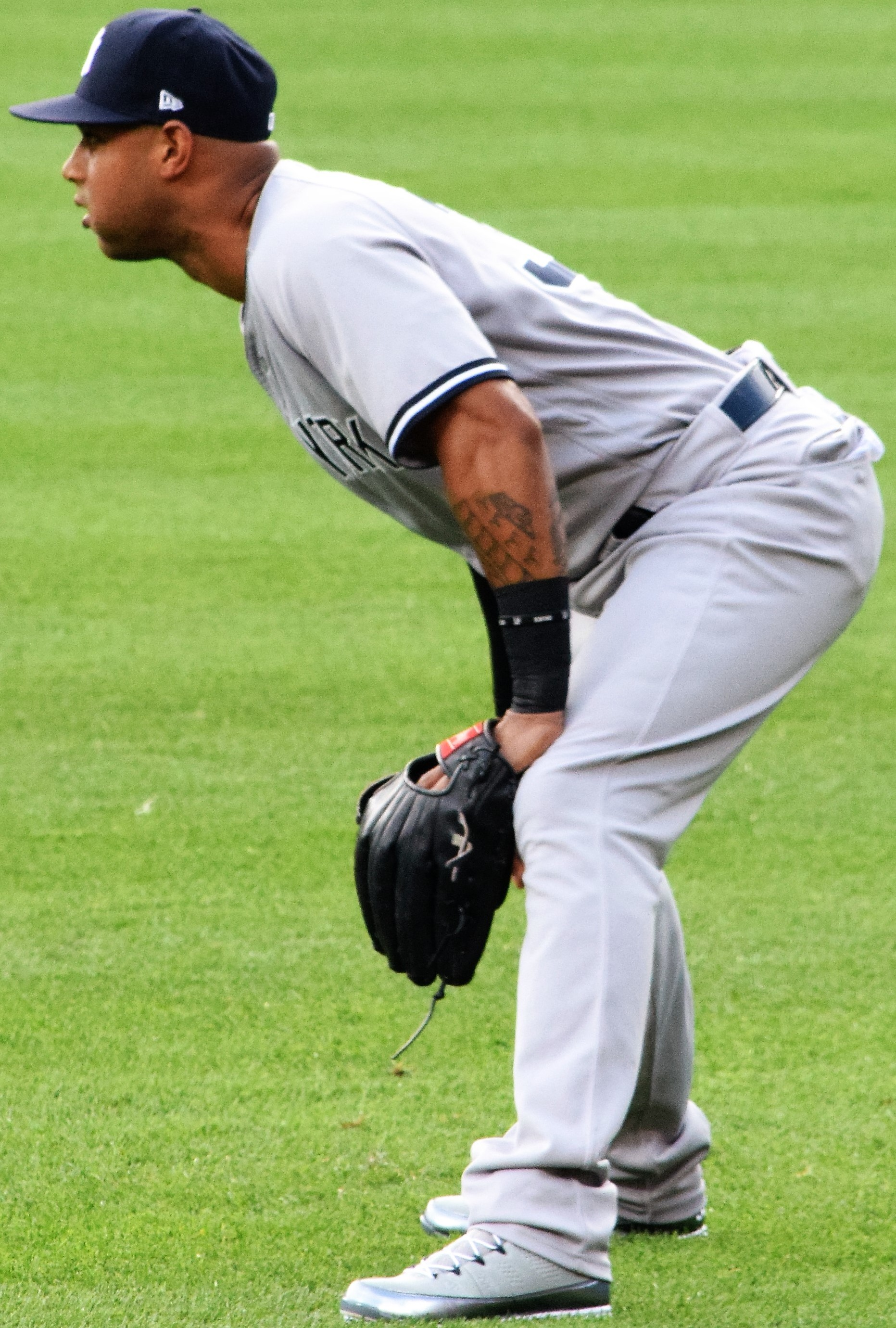
Hicks in 2018

On January 11, 2019, Hicks signed a one-year, $6 million contract to remain with the Yankees. On February 25, Hicks signed a seven-year, $70 million contract extension, replacing the one-year deal. The deal includes a $12.5 million club option for 2026, a $1 million buyout and a $2 million signing bonus. He began the 2019 year on the 10-day injured list due to a lower back strain. On May 6, he was optioned to the Tampa Tarpons for a rehab assignment. On June 24, against the Toronto Blue Jays, Hicks hit a home run that helped the Yankees tie a league record with 27 straight games hitting a home run. On June 29, 2019, Hicks became the first MLB player to hit a home run in Europe during the first inning of the Red Sox-Yankees 2019 London Series.

On September 10, 2019, Hicks suffered an elbow injury. It was revealed that Hicks was diagnosed with a right flexor strain in his right elbow since August 3, and that Tommy John surgery would be necessary to correct the problem. The Yankees ruled Hicks out for the rest of 2019 due to his elbow injury. After his Tommy John surgery recommendation, Hicks decided not to have surgery immediately and engaged in light physical activity on his own. On October 12, 2019, the Yankees added Hicks to the team's ALCS roster. He later underwent the surgery, and was expected to miss 8–10 months.

After the COVID-19 pandemic delayed the start of the 2020 season by over four months, Hicks returned to play in an intra-squad game just eight months post-surgery. In 2020, Hicks played in 54 games, batting .225 with six home runs and 21 RBIs.

On May 21, 2021, Hicks underwent surgery to repair a torn tendon sheath in his left wrist. On May 30, Hicks was placed on the 60-day injured list. In 2021, Hicks played in 32 games, posting a .194/.294/.333 batting line with four home runs and 14 RBIs.

On July 6, 2022, Hicks hit his first career grand slam while pinch hitting for Matt Carpenter as part of a 16–0 victory over the Pittsburgh Pirates. Fellow outfielder Aaron Judge, whom Hicks eventually replaced in center field, had hit a grand slam earlier that night, making the pair the first two players with the same first name to hit grand slams in the same game.

On September 10, 2022, Max Goodman of Sports Illustrated wrote the following:

Aaron Hicks has plunged to rock bottom on multiple occasions throughout the 2022 season. What transpired during the fourth inning during Friday night's loss against the Rays at Yankee Stadium, however, was arguably the lowest point he's ever experienced in pinstripes.

After dropping a fly ball in left field, proceeding to loiter on the warning track—thinking the ball was foul while two runs came around to score—Hicks came up empty on a second catchable ball and run-scoring hit in his direction.

The boos directed at Hicks from a sellout crowd in the Bronx were deafening, louder than they've been all season. It didn't stop until Estevan Florial replaced Hicks in left field to begin the next inning, a defensive switch that sparked cheers from the home crowd.

On September 23, Hicks hit a 405–foot home run off of Rich Hill of the Boston Red Sox for his 100th career home run. In 2022, Hicks batted .216/.330/.313 with eight home runs and 40 RBIs.

Although Hicks was considered the frontrunner to be the Yankees' starting left fielder entering the 2023 season, he ultimately started the season on the bench, with Oswaldo Cabrera being named the starting left fielder instead. Hicks played in 28 games for the Yankees in 2023, batting .188/.263/.261 with one home run and five RBI, before being designated for assignment on May 20, 2023 after Greg Allen was added to the roster. The Yankees released Hicks on May 26. More than two-and-one-half seasons remained in his contract, and the Yankees owed him $27.6M. Yankees manager Aaron Boone commented, "'I hope what doesn’t get lost is a couple of really good seasons that he had here, had some good postseason moments here. Some injuries really impacted his time here and probably impacted his career...'"

=== Baltimore Orioles (2023) ===
On May 30, 2023, Hicks signed a one-year major league contract with the Baltimore Orioles following an injury to Cedric Mullins. Hicks experienced a resurgence during his Orioles tenure, helping the team to win 101 games and finish first in the AL East. On June 20, he had a four-RBI game which included a first-inning three-run homer off Tyler Glasnow in the Orioles' 8–6 win over the Tampa Bay Rays. He responded to a hostile crowd at Yankee Stadium with a fifth-inning one-out solo homer to right off Clarke Schmidt in an 8–4 loss on July 4 in his second game against his previous team. He battled hamstring and lower back injuries in July and August, but returned in time for the team's final regular season stretch. In Game Two of the American League Division Series, Hicks gave the Orioles their only lead of the postseason with a two-run first-inning single against the Texas Rangers. He finished the ALDS with one home run and five runs batted in. In the regular season with the Orioles, Hicks played left field and right field and also served as the designated hitter, hitting seven home runs and slashing .275/.381/.425.

=== Los Angeles Angels (2024) ===
On January 29, 2024, the Los Angeles Angels agreed to terms with Hicks on a one-year deal worth the league minimum of $740,000. In 18 games for the Angels, he hit .140/.222/.193 with one home run and five RBI. On April 29, Hicks was designated for assignment. He was released by the organization two days later.

== Personal life ==
Hicks' father, Joe Hicks, was drafted by the San Diego Padres in the 12th round of the 1975 amateur draft, but his career was ended early by an eye injury. This experience led Joe Hicks to encourage his son to pursue golf. Hicks is an accomplished golfer, having competed in numerous youth golf tournaments.

On October 27, 2021, Hicks got engaged to professional golfer Cheyenne Woods. They married in February 2022, and their son was born in April 2022. They reside in Scottsdale, Arizona.
