= Puget Sound Collegiate League =

American baseball league

- Sport: Baseball
- Founded: 2010
- President: Matt Acker
- No. of teams: 7
- Countries: United States
- Website: PSCLBaseball.com

Founded in 2010, the Puget Sound Collegiate League (PSCL) was a collegiate summer baseball league based in the Olympia, Washington area.

== History ==
The league was originated by the forming of the Tacoma Cardinals (2006) followed by the Olympia Athletics (2007). PSCL opened its first season in 2010 with six teams.

League founder and president Matt Acker also owns the West Coast Guns, an independent team. In 2014 Acker took ownership of the Kitsap BlueJackets a West Coast League team. In 2017 he moved the WCL franchise to Port Angeles and they became the Port Angeles Lefties. The Kitsap BlueJackets became a semi-professional team, who compete in the Pacific International League (PIL) starting in 2017. The West Coast Guns were also members of the PIL.

Thurston County Senators, an affiliated team who play a full league schedule, are not eligible for PSCL playoffs. The semi-professional team is made up of former PSCL alumni and compete in elite tournaments, including the Grand Forks International and World Baseball Challenge.

== Teams ==
Team	Manager	Notes
Hawks Prairie Cardinals	Eric Widener	
Lacey Saints	Jared Munson	
Nisqually Silvers	Will Loza	
Olympia Athletics	Paul Sopak	
Tumwater Brewers	Abe Lupkin	
West Olympia Linx	Alex DeAngelis	
Affiliated Team	Manager	Notes
Thurston County Senators	Brady Hoover	Not eligible for playoffs

NOTE: Senators are an affiliate of the PSCL. The team also plays games against the teams of Pacific International League, West Coast League, tournaments and other amateur teams.

== Champions ==
Season	Winner	Finalist	Results
2010	Hawks Prairie Cardinals	Lacey Saints	2-0; 8-7
2011	Hawks Prairie Cardinals	Olympia Athletics	4-3 (11 innings); 8-3
2012	Olympia Athletics	Hawks Prairie Cardinals	5-3; 14-2
2013	West Olympia Linx	Tumwater Brewers	2-1 (13 innings)
2014	Nisqually Silvers	West Olympia Linx	6-5
2015	Nisqually Silvers	Tumwater Brewers	11-7
2016			
