= Brad Miller (baseball) =

American baseball player (born 1989)

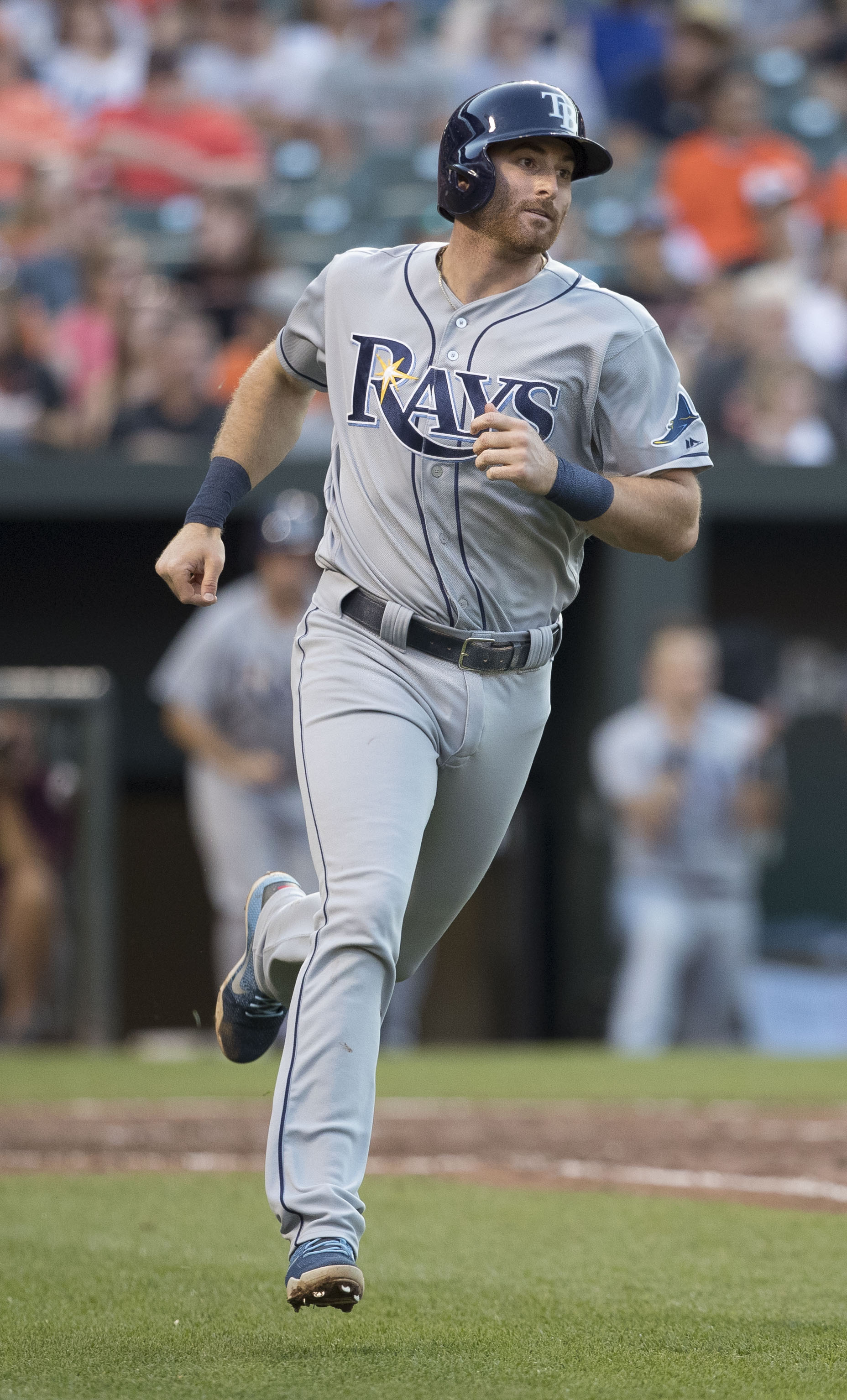
- Miller with the Tampa Bay Rays in 2016
- Utility player
- Born: October 18, 1989 (age 37); Orlando, Florida, U.S.
- Batted: Left Threw: Right

MLB debut
- June 28, 2013, for the Seattle Mariners

Last MLB appearance
- August 1, 2023, for the Texas Rangers

MLB statistics
- Batting average: .236
- Home runs: 123
- Runs batted in: 405
- Stats at Baseball Reference

Teams
- Seattle Mariners (2013–2015); Tampa Bay Rays (2016–2018); Milwaukee Brewers (2018); Cleveland Indians (2019); Philadelphia Phillies (2019); St. Louis Cardinals (2020); Philadelphia Phillies (2021); Texas Rangers (2022–2023)

Bradley Austin Miller (born October 18, 1989) is an American former professional baseball utility player. He played in Major League Baseball (MLB) for the Seattle Mariners, Tampa Bay Rays, Milwaukee Brewers, Cleveland Indians, Philadelphia Phillies, St. Louis Cardinals, and Texas Rangers. He currently serves as a pre- and post-game analyst for the Rangers Sports Network.

Miller grew up playing Little League baseball in Windermere, Florida, before attending Olympia High School, where he served as the team's shortstop. Although the Texas Rangers selected him in the 2008 MLB draft, Miller chose to play college baseball for the Clemson Tigers. As a junior in 2011, he won the Brooks Wallace Award, given annually to the best shortstop in college baseball. Miller was also named twice to the United States national collegiate baseball team, including appearances at the 2009 World Baseball Challenge and the 2010 World University Baseball Championship.

The Mariners selected Miller in the second round of the 2011 MLB draft, and he quickly rose through the Seattle farm system, making his major league debut in 2013. Throughout the 2014 season, Miller was in competition with several other Mariners for the role of starting shortstop, and by May 2015, he was being utilized as a "super utility" player, similar to Ben Zobrist. Miller was traded to the Rays prior to the 2016 season, where he was used first as the starting shortstop, then as the starting first baseman, and finally as the starting second baseman. After a banner 2016 season in which he hit 30 home runs, a series of injuries derailed Miller's next two seasons, and he was traded to the Brewers in 2018. Miller spent only one month within the Brewers organization before he was released. He then underwent microfracture surgery to repair a torn hip labrum.

Miller spent the 2019 season with a number of teams. He opted out of a minor league contract with the Los Angeles Dodgers, and made a brief appearance with the Indians before he was designated for assignment. After Miller spent some time with the Yankees' Triple A team, the Phillies signed him to take over as their utility player after Jay Bruce became their starting left fielder. Miller spent 2020 with the Cardinals before returning to the Phillies the following year.

== Early life ==
Miller was born on October 18, 1989, in Orlando, Florida, and grew up in Windermere. He began playing Little League baseball with a Windermere club and was childhood friends with future Major League Baseball (MLB) second baseman Nick Franklin. Miller's father, Steve, played college baseball for the Northern Iowa Panthers and served as his son's baseball coach from Little League to the beginning of high school.

Miller attended Olympia High School in Orlando, serving as the team's shortstop. As a sophomore in high school, Miller was invited to join retired MLB player Chet Lemon's summer Amateur Athletic Union team, "Juice". As a junior, Miller had a .420 batting average for Olympia, with a .560 on base percentage, six home runs, and 31 runs batted in (RBIs), and was named the team's Most Valuable Player.

== College career ==
The Texas Rangers selected Miller in the 39th round of the 2008 MLB draft, but he elected to attend Clemson University on a full college baseball scholarship. As a freshman at Clemson in 2009, Miller started all 66 games for the Tigers at shortstop. His first collegiate home run came on February 22, 2009, in a 6–5 extra innings victory over Charlotte. As a sophomore in 2010, Miller led Clemson with a .357 batting average. He also had eight home runs, a .458 on-base percentage, and nine stolen bases in 69 games. That same year, he helped take Clemson to the semifinal rounds of the 2010 College World Series, where they eventually fell to the University of South Carolina.

As a junior in the 2011 season, Miller led the Atlantic Coast Conference (ACC) with a .395 batting average and a .498 on-base percentage. Additionally, he recorded 11 doubles, three triples, five home runs, 50 RBIs, 53 runs, and 21 stolen bases in 56 games for Clemson, 54 of which were starts. At the end of the year, Miller received the Brooks Wallace Award, given to the best college baseball shortstop that season. Miller was also named the 2011 ACC Player of the Year and was a Louisville Slugger First-Team All-American as named by Collegiate Baseball. Clemson once again reached the college baseball postseason but was eliminated by Connecticut during the regional rounds.

In both 2009 and 2010, Miller was named to USA Baseball's Collegiate National Team. He helped lead the team to an overall 19–5 record and a World Baseball Challenge title. Starting in 15 of 23 games for Team USA in 2009, Miller collected 14 hits, 13 runs, and eight RBIs. Miller joined the Collegiate National Team again in 2010, when Team USA lost to Cuba in the gold medal match of the 2010 World University Baseball Championship.

== Professional career ==
=== Draft and minor leagues (2011–2013) ===
The Seattle Mariners selected Miller in the second round, 62nd overall, in the 2011 MLB draft, and he signed with the team that August. He spent the 2011 season with the Clinton LumberKings, the Mariners' Single–A minor league affiliate, and made a fast impression upon the team by batting .415 in his first 14 professional baseball games.

Miller started the 2012 season with the High–A High Desert Mavericks of the California League. By July, he ranked second in hits (136) and runs (87) and fourth in doubles across all of minor league baseball. Mavericks manager Pedro Grifol said that he was most impressed by how Miller "doesn't get tired ... He's the same guy every day with the same intensity, and his work capacity is off the charts". He was also named to the California League All-Star team and was named the league Player of the Week for the week ending April 15. Miller spent the second part of the season with the Double–A Jackson Generals. Between the two teams, Miller finished the 2012 season with a .334 average, 15 home runs, and 68 RBIs in 137 games. He ranked second among all Minor League Baseball players with 186 hits and led all members of the Mariners farm system with 56 multi-hit games. At the end of the season, he received the Mariners Heart and Soul Award for "exemplary play and leadership skills both on and off the field".

After playing 21 spring training games with the Mariners, Miller returned to Jackson in 2013 as MLB.com's ninth-highest Mariners prospect. He played 42 games with Jackson in 2013, batting .294 with six home runs and 25 RBIs in 153 at bats. He was quickly promoted to the Triple–A Tacoma Rainiers, where he hit .356 with six home runs and 28 RBIs in his first 22 games. At the end of June, Miller and pitcher Taijuan Walker were selected to play for Team USA in the 2013 All-Star Futures Game. Miller would not participate in the game itself, however, due to a call-up to the major leagues.

=== Seattle Mariners (2013–2015) ===
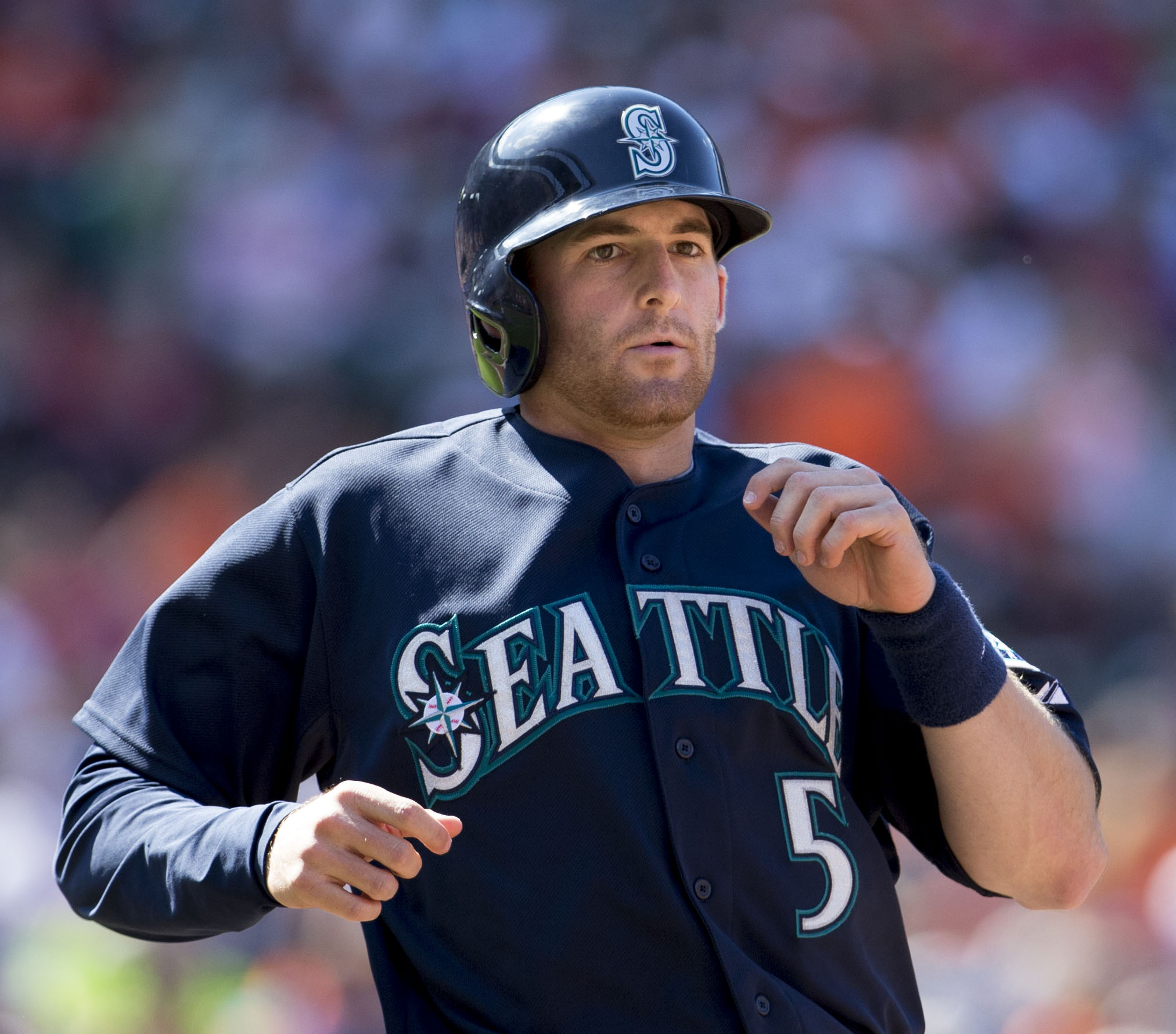
Miller with the Mariners in 2013

Miller was called up to the Mariners on June 28, 2013, and made his major league debut the same day against the Chicago Cubs. Although he did not record a hit, his offensive and defensive plays impressed manager Eric Wedge, who said that Miller had "a solid first game". Miller's first two major league home runs came on July 19 in a 10–7 win against the Houston Astros, making him the second Mariner rookie, behind childhood friend Franklin, to hit his first two career home runs in the same game. He was also the first player in Mariners history to play two games with at least four RBI in the first 17 games of his career. His performance in that July 19 game earned Miller his first American League (AL) Player of the Week title for the week ending July 21.

On August 14, 2013, both Miller and Tampa Bay Rays player Ben Zobrist recorded both a leadoff and an additional home run. It was the second time in MLB history that both teams' leadoff hitters accomplished such a feat, following Chuck Knoblauch of the Minnesota Twins and Tony Phillips of the Detroit Tigers in 1994. Prior to that game, neither batter had led off a major league game with a home run. Miller closed out the season with his first career grand slam, which came in the fifth inning of a 7–5 win over the Oakland Athletics on September 28. In his rookie season, Miller batted .265 with eight home runs and 36 RBIs in 76 games and 306 at bats.

Going into the 2014 season, the Mariners signed Robinson Canó to serve as their everyday second baseman. This in turn pushed Miller into competition with Franklin, who had played second base the previous season, for the starting shortstop position. Miller's performance in spring training, batting .410 with four home runs and a 1.314 on-base plus slugging (OPS), won him the starting shortstop job. He struggled both offensively and defensively in the first part of the season, striking out in nearly 30% of his plate appearances in April and committing six errors in the first 34 games of the season, most of which occurred during routine plays. After what looked like a brief resurgence in June, Miller continued to slump, and the Mariners called up Chris Taylor from Tacoma on July 25 to take over the position. Taylor and Miller split the remainder of the season half and half. Miller finished the 2014 season with a .221 average, 10 home runs, and 36 RBIs in 123 games and 367 at bats.

Miller and Taylor entered 2015 in competition for the starting shortstop role, a position which Miller won by default after Taylor broke a bone in his wrist in mid-March and was expected to be sidelined for four to six weeks. When Taylor returned in early May, he was made the team's shortstop, while Miller was told that he would play in a "super utility role", similar to that of Zobrist. He received his second career AL Player of the Week honor on May 17, following a six-game hitting streak that included three multi-hit games. His role as a utility player included a brief and unsuccessful stint in center field, which negatively impacted his overall defensive performance. Offensively, Miller batted .258 for the season, with 11 home runs and 46 RBIs in 438 at bats.

=== Tampa Bay Rays (2016–2018) ===
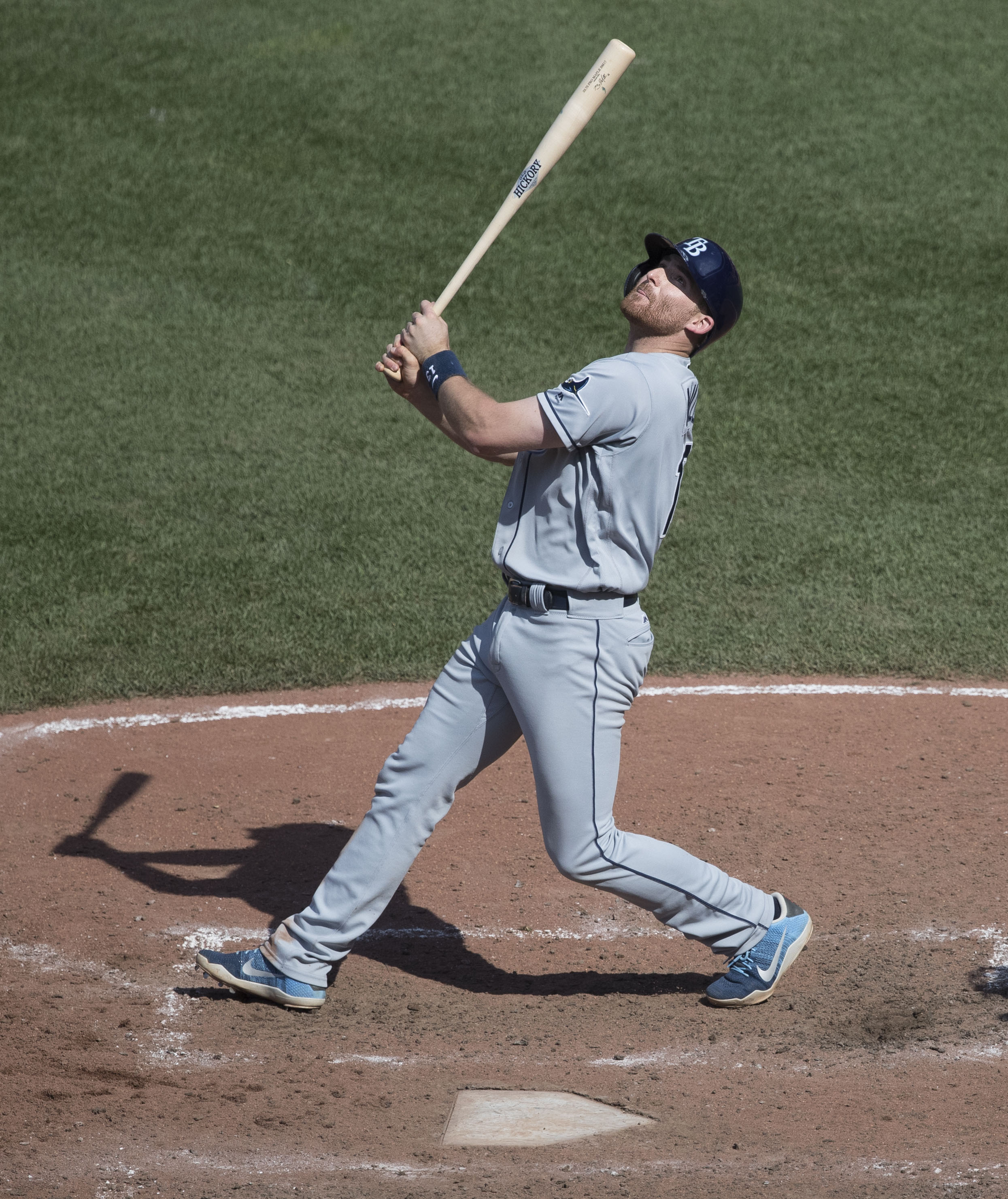
Miller with the Rays

On November 5, 2015, the Mariners traded Miller, first baseman Logan Morrison, and pitcher Danny Farquhar to the Tampa Bay Rays in exchange for pitchers Nathan Karns and C. J. Riefenhauser, as well as outfield prospect Boog Powell. Serving as the Rays' shortstop in 2016, Miller struggled defensively, committing 13 errors in his first 90 games. Offensively, his performance was stronger, setting the franchise record with 17 single-season home runs as a shortstop. His record-setting 16th season home run as a shortstop came on July 31 in a game against the New York Yankees. The ball landed in the Rays Touch Tank, a hands-on aquarium exhibit in center field. He was the fifth player to notch a home run into the Touch Tank since it opened in 2006.

Despite improving in the middle infield in the month of July, with his last error coming on July 6, the Rays moved Miller to first base in August after acquiring Matt Duffy from the San Francisco Giants. At the time, regular first baseman Morrison had been on the disabled list; when he returned, Miller remained at first base while Morrison became a designated hitter. Miller capped off his breakout hitting year on September 21 in an 11–5 win against the Yankees. First, he was responsible for the second of three consecutive home runs in the third inning of the game, bookended by Evan Longoria and Corey Dickerson. In the eighth inning, Miller hit an additional solo home run to boost his season total to 30. He trailed off after that, batting only .158 in his last 27 games and ending the season with an 0-for-18 slump. In his first season with the Rays, Miller batted .243 and set career highs with 30 home runs and 81 RBIs.

Following the departure of Logan Forsythe, Rays manager Kevin Cash placed Miller at second base for the 2017 season, saying that he was "still going to play short because we know that versatility will help us. But he is all about playing second base and being a really good one." Miller scored the first walk-off RBI of his career on April 8, when Toronto Blue Jays reliever Casey Lawrence walked him with the bases loaded in the 11th inning of a 2–2 deadlock. Miller's RBI walk brought home Mallex Smith, winning the game for Tampa. A pair of injuries, first a left abdominal strain and then a right groin strain, sidelined Miller for a combined 42 games. In his absence, Tim Beckham took over at second base, a position he retained until being traded to the Baltimore Orioles on July 31, allowing Miller to return to his position. Miller's injuries negatively impacted his offensive performance in 2017; he hit a career low .201 in 110 games, and his nine home runs were the fewest since his rookie season.

Miller missed a large part of the Rays' 2018 spring training after suffering a pinky toe fracture on February 23, leaving his major league role in question. Due to his series of injuries and lukewarm performance, Miller was designated for assignment on June 7, 2018, to make room on the 25-man roster for first base prospect Jake Bauers. At the time, Miller was hitting .256 with five home runs and 21 RBIs in 48 games.

=== Milwaukee Brewers (2018) ===
On June 10, 2018, the Rays traded Miller to the Milwaukee Brewers in exchange for utility player Ji-man Choi. Miller started his Brewers tenure as the shortstop for the Triple-A Colorado Springs Sky Sox but was promoted on June 23 after right fielder Domingo Santana was optioned to the minors. On July 2, 2018, Miller recorded the second walk-off walk of his career, joining Adrian Beltre and Russell Martin as the only active MLB players at the time to have multiple walk-off walks. Miller was designated for assignment on July 28 to make room in the lineup for recently acquired infielder Mike Moustakas. After being released from his contract shortly thereafter, Miller underwent arthroscopic surgery in late August to repair a torn hip labrum that he had suffered in 2017. The microfracture surgery was similar to one undergone by Corey Seager, and was intended to address cartilage damage from the injury. Miller played in 27 games for Milwaukee, batting .230 with two home runs, eight RBIs, and five runs.

=== Cleveland Indians (2019) ===
Miller signed a minor league contract with the Los Angeles Dodgers on February 28, 2019, with the expectation that he would take over the second baseman role abdicated by Chase Utley. On March 21, however, Miller opted out of his contract and became a free agent when he learned that he would not be named to the Dodgers' Opening Day roster. Three days later, Miller signed a one-year, $1 million contract with the Cleveland Indians. He began the season at second base, filling in for an injured Jason Kipnis. When Kipnis returned from the disabled list on April 15, Miller was designated for assignment. Miller was frustrated with the team's decision to remove him from the roster, telling reporters, "Obviously, they don't want the best guys up there. So I'm just trying to take it somewhere else and see what we've got." After clearing waivers, Miller elected free agency on April 17. He batted .250 in Cleveland, with one home run and four RBI in 36 at-bats.

=== New York Yankees (2019) ===
The New York Yankees signed Miller to a minor league deal on April 22, 2019. At the time, 13 players were on New York's injured list, including four infielders. He played in 41 games with the Triple A Scranton/Wilkes-Barre RailRiders of the International League, batting .294 with 10 home runs and 29 RBI in 136 at-bats.

=== Philadelphia Phillies (2019) ===
On June 13, 2019, the Yankees traded Miller to the Philadelphia Phillies in exchange for cash considerations. He took over Jay Bruce's role as the Phillies' utility player, as Bruce had become the Phillies' regular left fielder after Andrew McCutchen suffered a season-ending anterior cruciate ligament injury. Miller became a much-needed left-handed batter for the Phillies' struggling offense, going 6-for-16 with two home runs and four walks in his first appearances. Although the Phillies' season was disappointing, with an 81–81 record, Miller's two home runs in the final game of the season made him the first player in franchise history to record three multi-home run games in a nine-game span. While playing a variety of roles for the season, including third base, shortstop, and outfield, Miller batted .263 for the Phillies in 2019, with 12 home runs and 21 RBI in 118 at-bats.

=== St. Louis Cardinals (2020) ===
Miller signed a one-year, $2 million contract with the St. Louis Cardinals on February 12, 2020. During his stints as a free agent, the Cardinals had reached out to Miller, but had never been able to make room for him on the 40-man roster. After Jordan Hicks underwent Tommy John surgery, the Cardinals were able to accommodate the extra player. On September 1, Miller hit two home runs and recorded seven RBI, the latter a career high, in a 16–2 game against the Cincinnati Reds. The Cardinals' 23 game hits were the highest in any MLB game that season. During the 60-game season, shortened by the COVID-19 pandemic, Miller played in 48 games for the Cardinals, hitting .232 with seven home runs and 25 RBI in 142 at-bats.

=== Second stint with the Philadelphia Phillies (2021) ===
Miller signed a one-year, $3.5 million contract to return to the Phillies on February 17, 2021. Miller hit his 100th career home run on May 25, against Shawn Morimando of the Miami Marlins. On July 8, while starting at first base and batting second against the Chicago Cubs, Miller hit three home runs and collected five RBI in the Phillies' 8–0 victory. It was the first three-home run game of Miller's career and the first by any member of the Phillies since Jayson Werth in 2008. On July 29, Miller capped off a Phillies comeback with a walk-off grand slam against the Washington Nationals, bringing the final score to 11–8. It was the first time that Philadelphia had mounted a victory after starting a game with a deficit of seven or more runs since 2010. In 140 games and 331 at bats for the Phillies, Miller batted .227 for the season, with 20 home runs and 49 RBI. He became a free agent at the end of the season.

=== Texas Rangers (2022–2023) ===
On March 17, 2022, Miller signed a two-year, $10 million contract with the Texas Rangers. The deal gave the Rangers versatility in the outfield and at third base, particularly while top prospect Josh Jung was sidelined by injury. Miller played his 1,000th MLB game on June 26, going 1-for-4 in left field against the Washington Nationals. Miller spent much of the 2022 season battling neck and hip soreness, and after multiple stints on the injured list, he was shut down in September. In 222 at bats across 81 games, he hit .212 with seven home runs and 32 RBI.

After homering against the Toronto Blue Jays in the Rangers' 2022 season opener, Miller started the 2023 season with a home run against the Philadelphia Phillies, becoming the first Ranger since Ian Kinsler to homer in consecutive Opening Day games. His injury trouble continued in his second season with the Rangers. After hitting .208 with one home run and six RBI as a bench player, he was placed on the injured list with a right oblique strain on June 3. Miller returned to the lineup on June 30, but was sidelined again on August 2 with a left hamstring strain. In September, the Rangers transferred Miller to the 60-day injured list, which enabled them to promote top prospect Evan Carter and keep Carter on the roster for the postseason. After hitting .214 with one home run and six RBI in 56 at-bats, Miller became a free agent at the end of the season.

=== San Diego Padres (2024) ===
On March 5, 2024, Miller signed a minor league contract with the San Diego Padres, in a deal that included an invitation to spring training. After going 0-for-6 with three strikeouts in Cactus League play, he was released on March 13.

On November 24, 2025, Miller announced his retirement from professional baseball.

== Post-playing career ==
On May 14, 2025, the Rangers Sports Network hired Miller to serve as a pre- and post-game analyst.

== Player profile ==
Although he has played in various positions throughout his major league career, Miller has always preferred playing shortstop. He told the Tampa Bay Times in 2015, "Obviously in this game you want to give yourself all the opportunities and do whatever is asked of you. But I'm a shortstop, and I know where I want to be on the field." When playing for AL teams, Miller has also seen time as a designated hitter. He told the St. Louis Post-Dispatch in 2020 that "the industry views me as more of a bat", and that his defensive abilities have come under criticism. When playing defensively, Miller uses three different baseball gloves, as well as a first baseman's mitt given to him by Paul Goldschmidt, depending on what role he is expected to play.

== Personal life ==
Miller is a bamboo aficionado. He keeps several bamboo plants in his Florida home, saying that the plants are low-maintenance enough to maintain with a baseball schedule. In June 2019, he purchased a "lucky bamboo plant" from a shop in Philadelphia's Chinatown, which he believed helped break the Phillies' seven-game losing streak.
