= Akada =

Akada (written: 赤田 lit. "red field") is a Japanese surname. Notable people with the surname include:

- Ryuichiro Akada (赤田 龍一郎, born 1988), Japanese baseball player
- Shogo Akada (赤田 将吾, born 1980), Japanese baseball player
