= 2017 in baseball =

The following are the baseball events of the year 2017 throughout the world.

== Champions ==
=== Major League Baseball ===
- World Series: Houston Astros
  - American League: Houston Astros
    - Eastern Division: Boston Red Sox
    - Central Division: Cleveland Indians
    - Western Division: Houston Astros
    - Wild Card: New York Yankees and Minnesota Twins
  - National League: Los Angeles Dodgers
    - Eastern Division: Washington Nationals
    - Central Division: Chicago Cubs
    - Western Division: Los Angeles Dodgers
    - Wild Card: Arizona Diamondbacks and Colorado Rockies

=== Other champions ===
- Nippon Professional Baseball
  - Pacific League Pennant: Fukuoka SoftBank Hawks
  - Central League Pennant: Yokohama DeNA BayStars
  - Japan Series Champions: Fukuoka SoftBank Hawks
- KBO
  - Kia Tigers
- Minor League Baseball
  - AAA
    - Championship: Durham Bulls (Tampa Bay Rays)
      - International League: Durham Bulls (Tampa Bay Rays)
      - Pacific Coast League: Memphis Redbirds (St. Louis Cardinals)
    - Mexican League: Toros de Tijuana
  - AA
    - Eastern League: Altoona Curve (Pittsburgh Pirates)
    - Southern League: Chattanooga Lookouts (Minnesota Twins) and Pensacola Blue Wahoos (Cincinnati Reds) - designated co-champions as championship series was cancelled due to Hurricane Irma
    - Texas League: Midland RockHounds (Oakland Athletics)
  - High A
    - California League: Modesto Nuts (Seattle Mariners)
    - Carolina League: Down East Wood Ducks (Texas Rangers) and Lynchburg Hillcats (Cleveland Indians) - designated co-champions as championship series was cancelled due to Hurricane Irma.
    - Florida State League: Dunedin Blue Jays (Toronto Blue Jays) and Palm Beach Cardinals (St. Louis Cardinals) - designated co-champions as championship series was cancelled due to Hurricane Irma
  - A
    - Midwest League: Quad Cities River Bandits (Houston Astros)
    - South Atlantic League: Greenville Drive (Boston Red Sox)
  - Short Season A
    - New York–Penn League: Hudson Valley Renegades (Tampa Bay Rays)
    - Northwest League: Vancouver Canadians (Toronto Blue Jays)
  - Rookie
    - Appalachian League: Elizabethton Twins (Minnesota Twins)
    - Arizona League: AZL Cubs (Chicago Cubs)
    - Dominican Summer League: DSL Dodgers 2 (Los Angeles Dodgers)
    - Gulf Coast League: GCL Yankees East (New York Yankees)
    - Pioneer League: Ogden Raptors (Los Angeles Dodgers)
  - Arizona Fall League: Peoria Javelinas
- Independent baseball leagues
  - American Association: Winnipeg Goldeyes
  - Atlantic League: York Revolution
  - Can-Am League: Québec Capitales
  - Empire League: Plattsburgh Redbirds
  - Frontier League: Schaumburg Boomers
  - Pacific Association: Vallejo Admirals
  - Pecos League: High Desert Yardbirds
  - United Shore League: Birmingham Bloomfield Beavers
- Amateur
  - College
    - College World Series: Florida
    - NCAA Division II: West Chester
    - NCAA Division III: Cal Lutheran
    - NAIA: Lewis–Clark State College
    - Junior College Baseball World Series: Chipola College
    - Cape Cod Baseball League: Brewster Whitecaps
    - West Coast League: Corvallis Knights
  - Youth
    - Junior League World Series: Hsin Ming Little League (Taoyuan, Taiwan)
    - Intermediate League World Series: Radames Lopez Little League (Guayama, Puerto Rico)
    - Little League World Series: Tokyo Kitasuna Little League (Tokyo, Japan)
    - Senior League World Series: Aguadulce Cabezera Little League (Aguadulce, Panama)

=== International competition ===
- National Teams
  - Asian Baseball Championship: Japan
  - 18U Baseball World Cup: USA
  - 12U Baseball World Cup: USA
  - Summer Universiade: Japan
  - World Baseball Classic: USA
  - World Port Tournament: Taiwan
- International club team competitions
  - Caribbean Series: Criollos de Caguas
  - European Cup: Curaçao Neptunus
  - Grand Forks International: Seattle Studs
- Domestic Leagues
  - Australian Baseball League: Brisbane Bandits
  - British League: London Mets
  - Cuban National Series: Alazanes de Granma
  - Dominican League: Tigres del Licey
  - Dutch Baseball League: Neptunus
  - French League: Huskies de Rouen
  - Finnish Baseball Championship: Espoo Expos
  - German League: Heidenheim Heideköpfe
  - Italian Baseball League: ASD Rimini
  - Japan Series: Fukuoka SoftBank Hawks
    - Pacific League: Fukuoka SoftBank Hawks
    - Central League: Yokohama DeNA BayStars
  - Korean Series: Kia Tigers
  - Mexican Pacific League: Águilas de Mexicali
  - Puerto Rican League: Criollos de Caguas
  - Spanish League: Tenerife Marlins
  - Swedish League: Sölvesborg Firehawks
  - Taiwan Series: Lamigo Monkeys
  - Venezuelan League: Águilas del Zulia

== Awards and honors ==
=== Major League Baseball ===
- Baseball Hall of Fame honors
- Major Awards
- MVP Award
  - American League: Jose Altuve (HOU)
  - National League: Giancarlo Stanton (MIA)
- Cy Young Award
  - American League: Corey Kluber (CLE)
  - National League: Max Scherzer (WSH)
- Rookie of the Year Award
  - American League: Aaron Judge (NYY)
  - National League: Cody Bellinger (LAD)
- Manager of the Year Award
  - American League: Paul Molitor (MIN)
  - National League: Torey Lovullo (AZ)
- Postseason awards
- World Series MVP: George Springer (HOU)
- League Championship Series MVP
  - American League: Justin Verlander (HOU)
  - National League: Justin Turner and Chris Taylor (LAD)
- Babe Ruth Award:
  - Jose Altuve (HOU)
  - Justin Verlander (HOU)
- Regular season awards
- All-Star Game MVP: Robinson Canó (SEA)
- Comeback Player of the Year:
  - American League: Mike Moustakas (KC)
  - National League: Ryan Zimmerman (WSH)
- Reliever of the Year Award
  - American League: Craig Kimbrel (BOS)
  - National League: Kenley Jansen (LAD)
- Hank Aaron Award
  - American League: Jose Altuve (HOU)
  - National League: Giancarlo Stanton (MIA)
- Lou Gehrig Memorial Award: Jose Altuve (HOU)
- Luis Aparicio Award: Jose Altuve (HOU)
- Roberto Clemente Award: Anthony Rizzo (CHC)
- Roy Campanella Award: Justin Turner (LAD)
- Tip O'Neill Award: Joey Votto (CIN)
- Tony Conigliaro Award: Chad Bettis (COL)
- Warren Spahn Award: Clayton Kershaw (LAD)
- Willie Mac Award: Nick Hundley (SF)

Others

- Ford C. Frick Award: Bob Costas (Sportscaster)
- J. G. Taylor Spink Award: Claire Smith (Journalist)

Baseball America awards

- MLB Player of the Year : Jose Altuve (HOU)
- MLB Rookie of the Year : Aaron Judge (NYY)
- MLB Manager of the Year : A. J. Hinch (HOU)
- MLB Executive of the Year : Brian Cashman (NYY)
- MLB Organization of the Year : Los Angeles Dodgers
- MiLB Player of the Year Award : Ronald Acuña (Florida/Mississippi/Gwinnett [ATL])
- MiLB Team of the Year Award : Midland RockHounds (Texas League) [OAK])
- MiLB Executive of the Year : Ryan Keur (Daytona Tortugas [President])

Sporting News awards

- Player of the Year Award: Jose Altuve (HOU)
- Starting pitcher of the Year Award
  - American League: Chris Sale (BOS)
  - National League: Max Scherzer (WSH)
- Relief pitcher of the Year Award
  - American League: Craig Kimbrel (BOS)
  - National League: Kenley Jansen (LAD)
- Rookie of the Year Award
  - American League: Aaron Judge (NYY)
  - National League: Cody Bellinger (LAD)
- Comeback Player of the Year Award
  - American League: Mike Moustakas (KC)
  - National League: Greg Holland (COL)
- Manager of the Year Award
  - American League: Terry Francona (CLE)
  - National League: Craig Counsell (MIL)
- Executive of the Year Award: Chris Antonetti (CLE)
- Associated Press Athlete of the Year: Jose Altuve (HOU)
- Sports Illustrated Sportsperson of the Year: Jose Altuve (HOU)
- Players Choice Awards
- Outstanding Players
  - American League: Jose Altuve (HOU)
  - National League: Giancarlo Stanton (MIA)
- Outstanding Pitchers
  - American League: Corey Kluber (CLE)
  - National League: Max Scherzer (WSH)
- Outstanding Rookies
  - American League: Aaron Judge (NYY)
  - National League: Cody Bellinger (LAD)
- Comeback Players of the Year
  - American League: Mike Moustakas (KC)
  - National League: Ryan Zimmerman (WSH)
- Choice Man of the Year: Anthony Rizzo (CHC)
- Choice Player of the Year: Jose Altuve (HOU)
- Silver Slugger Awards

| American League | | | National League |
| Player | Team | Position | Player | Team |
|---|---|---|---|---|
| Eric Hosmer | (KC) | First baseman | Paul Goldschmidt | (AZ) |
| Jose Altuve | (HOU) | Second baseman | Daniel Murphy | (WSH) |
| José Ramírez | (CLE) | Third baseman | Nolan Arenado | (COL) |
| Francisco Lindor | (CLE) | Shortstop | Corey Seager | (LAD) |
| Aaron Judge | (NYY) | Outfielder | Charlie Blackmon | (COL) |
| George Springer | (HOU) | Outfielder | Marcell Ozuna | (MIA) |
| Justin Upton | (LAA) | Outfielder | Giancarlo Stanton | (MIA) |
| Gary Sánchez | (NYY) | Catcher | Buster Posey | (SF) |
| Nelson Cruz | (SEA) | Designated hitter/pitcher | Adam Wainwright | (STL) |

- Gold Glove Awards

| American League | | | National League |
| Player | Team | Position | Player | Team |
|---|---|---|---|---|
| Eric Hosmer | (KC) | First baseman | Paul Goldschmidt | (AZ) |
| Brian Dozier | (MIN) | Second baseman | DJ LeMahieu | (COL) |
| Evan Longoria | (TB) | Third baseman | Nolan Arenado * | (COL) |
| Andrelton Simmons | (LAA) | Shortstop | Brandon Crawford | (SF) |
| Alex Gordon | (KC) | Left fielder | Marcell Ozuna | (MIA) |
| Byron Buxton * | (MIN) | Center fielder | Ender Inciarte | (ATL) |
| Mookie Betts | (BOS) | Right fielder | Jason Heyward | (CHC) |
| Martín Maldonado | (LAA) | Catcher | Tucker Barnhart | (CIN) |
| Marcus Stroman | (TOR) | Pitcher | Zack Greinke | (AZ) |

* Platinum Glove Award Winner

=== Minor League Baseball ===
- International League MVP :
  - Rhys Hoskins (Lehigh Valley IronPigs [PHI])
- Pacific Coast League MVP :
  - Christian Walker (Reno Aces [AZ])
- Eastern League MVP :
  - Garabez Rosa (Bowie Baysox [BAL])
- Southern League MVP :
  - Kevin Cron (Jackson Generals [AZ])
- Texas League Player of the Year :
  - Matt Beaty (Tulsa Drillers [LAD])
- Joe Bauman Home Run Award :
  - A. J. Reed (Fresno Grizzlies [HOU])
- Arizona Fall League :
  - Joe Black Award: Ronald Acuña (Gwinnett Braves [ATL])
  - Dernell Stenson Sportsmanship Award: Eric Filia (Peoria Javelinas [SEA])
- All-Star Futures Game :
  - Larry Doby Award – Brent Honeywell (Durham Bulls [TB])
- USA Today MiLB Player of the Year :
  - Ronald Acuña (Gwinnett Braves [ATL])

== Events ==
=== January ===
- January 18 – Jeff Bagwell, Tim Raines and Iván Rodríguez are elected into the Hall of Fame by the Baseball Writers' Association of America. Bagwell, in his seventh year on the ballot, receives 86.2% of 442 votes, up from the 71.6% he received in 2016; Raines, in his tenth and final year on the ballot, receives 86.0% of the votes, up from the 69.8% he received in 2016; and Rodríguez receives 76.0% of the vote in his first year on the ballot, becoming only the second catcher to be inducted as a first-year candidate, Johnny Bench having done so in 1989. The Hall narrowly misses matching its largest class ever, since the inaugural class of 1936, in which five players were inducted; second-year candidate Trevor Hoffman and first-year candidate Vladimir Guerrero receiving 74.0% and 71.7% of the vote respectively.

=== February ===
- February 19 – In an 11–3 victory over VCU, Florida State coach Mike Martin becomes only the second NCAA baseball coach to achieve 1,900 career victories.

=== March ===
- March 22 – Team USA wins their first World Baseball Classic with an 8–0 victory over previously unbeaten Puerto Rico national team. USA pitcher Marcus Stroman earned Most Valuable Player honors.

=== April ===
- April 2 :
  - San Francisco Giants pitching ace Madison Bumgarner became the first pitcher in Major League History to hit two home runs on Opening Day. Bumgarner also took a perfect game into the sixth inning against the Arizona Diamondbacks, but ultimately settled for a no-decision in a 6–5 loss to Arizona. Bumgarner hit a two-run homer off Arizona starter Zack Greinke in the fifth inning that gave the Giants a 2–0 lead. His second home run came off reliever Andrew Chafin in the seventh inning to tie the score 3–3, after the Diamondbacks spoiled his perfect game and tied the score with three runs on four hits in the sixth inning. He struck out 11 with no walks in seven innings. According to the Elias Sports Bureau, Dodgers' Don Drysdale is the only other pitcher with multiple Opening Day home runs in a Major League career. Drysdale hit one home run on Opening Day in 1959 and another in 1965.
  - The Chicago Cubs came into the MLB season as the reigning World Series champions for the first time in 109 years and as huge favorites to win the 2017 World Series. Nevertheless, the Cubs started its season with a 4–3 walk-off loss to their division rivals St. Louis Cardinals at Busch Stadium.
- April 14 – The Atlanta Braves opened their new ballpark, SunTrust Park, with a 5–2 victory over the San Diego Padres before a sellout crowd of 41,149. Before the game, 83-year-old Braves legend Hank Aaron, who threw the final pitch at Turner Field in 2016, threw out the inaugural ceremonial first pitch at the new park. Aaron was among several former Braves on hand to open their new home. Then, Braves center fielder Ender Inciarte recorded the first out, delivered the first hit and scored the first run in the bottom of the first inning, and later belted the first home run at the new park in the sixth. Braves' starter Julio Teherán was credited with the win and closer Jim Johnson earned the save, while Padres' starter Jhoulys Chacín took the loss.
- April 22 – Cincinnati Reds right-handed pitching prospect Tyler Mahle hurled a nine-inning perfect game, needing only 88 pitches, as Double-A Pensacola Blue Wahoos edged the Mobile BayBears, 1–0, at Hank Aaron Stadium. It was the first perfect game in Wahoos history, as well as the second nine-inning perfect game in Southern League history and first since Montgomery Rebels' Charles Swanson accomplished the feat over the Savannah Indians on August 14, 1970. Mahle, who finished with eight strikeouts, previously pitched a no-hitter with High-A Daytona Tortugas in 2016 against the Jupiter Hammerheads.
- April 26 – Gift Ngoepe entered the records books when he became the first ever black African to play in Major League Baseball history. A 27-year-old infielder born in Randburg, South Africa, Ngoepe debuted for the Pittsburgh Pirates in a 6–5 win over the Chicago Cubs at PNC Park. In his first Major League at bat, he led off the fourth inning with a single against Cubs pitching ace Jon Lester. Besides, Ngoepe was a member of the South Africa national baseball team at the 2009 World Baseball Classic and spent eight-plus seasons in the Pirates Minor League system.
- April 30 – Anthony Rendon had a historic performance for the Washington Nationals, going 6-for-6 with three home runs, a three-run double, five runs, and driving in 10 in a 23–5 rout over the New York Mets at Nationals Park. With his effort, Rendon joined Walker Cooper as the only players in Major League Baseball history to collect six hits, three home runs and 10 RBI in a game. Cooper did it for the Cincinnati Reds in 1949. Moreover, Rendon became the 13th player with at least 10 RBI in a game as well as the fourth player since 1900 to go 6-for-6 and have at least three home runs in a single game, joining Ty Cobb (Tigers, 1925), Edgardo Alfonzo (Mets, 1999) and Shawn Green (Dodgers, 2002). Green hit four homers in his 6-for-6 game.

=== May ===
- May 3 - Vin Scully is inducted into the Dodgers Ring of Honor, becoming the first non-uniformed member of the organization to be recognized with an official retirement ceremony.
- May 4 – The versatile Marwin González hit a home run in his fifth straight start for the Houston Astros in a 10–4 loss to the Texas Rangers at Minute Maid Park. Besides, the Venezuelan utility man, who literally plays all positions except pitcher and catcher, became the first Major Leaguer since 1901 to hit a home run in four consecutive games while playing at a different position, according to the Elias Sports Bureau. Overall, González leads the Astros with 21 RBI and nine home runs; six in the last five games after hitting two, including his first career grand slam, the night before.
- May 13 – The Washington Nationals and outfielder Bryce Harper reached an agreement on a one-year deal for the 2018 season. The four-time All-Star and 2015 National League MVP will receive $21.625 million, making his 2018 salary the largest ever for a player who would have been eligible for arbitration. The agreement locks up Harper for his final arbitration-eligible year, as he can become a free agent after the 2018 season.
- May 27 :
  - Brian Johnson pitched a complete game shutout in his first major league appearance at Fenway Park, and the Boston Red Sox extended their winning streak to a season-high six games with a 6–0 victory over the Seattle Mariners. The left-handed Johnson allowed just five singles, struck out eight and walked none, to become the first Red Sox pitcher to throw a complete-game shutout in his Fenway debut since Pedro Martínez did it on April 11, 1998.
  - Stephen Strasburg recorded a career-high 15 strikeouts and allowed three hits over seven innings, as the Washington Nationals beat the San Diego Padres, 3–0, at Nationals Park. Strasburg previously struck out 14 batters in a game twice, including in his Major League debut on June 8, 2010.

=== June ===
- June 3:
  - At Marlins Park, Edinson Vólquez of the Miami Marlins no-hit the Arizona Diamondbacks 3–0. Surviving a collision with Diamondback leadoff hitter Rey Fuentes on a play at first base, the first batter into the game, Vólquez struck out 10 batters and walked two, both erased on Brandon Drury-hit double plays, while recording the first no-hitter in over a year, as well as the Marlins' sixth no-hitter overall. The most recent was pitched by Henderson Álvarez on September 29, 2013. Afterwards, Vólquez dedicated the game to former teammates José Fernández, who died on September 25, 2016, and Yordano Ventura, died on January 22, 2017, who would have turned 26 on this day.
  - At Angel Stadium of Anaheim, Albert Pujols of the Los Angeles Angels of Anaheim became the ninth player to hit 600 home runs in a Major League Baseball career. Pujols hit the milestone home run, a grand slam, off Minnesota Twins pitcher Ervin Santana in the fourth inning, as the Angels beat Minnesota 7–2. Besides, Pujols became the fourth youngest player to reach this milestone, and the first to do so with a grand slam.
  - A total of seven grand slams were hit across Major League Baseball in one day. Kyle Schwarber for the Cubs, Matt Adams for the Braves, Ian Desmond for the Rockies, Travis Shaw for the Brewers, Chris Taylor for the Dodgers, Albert Pujols for the Angels, and Mike Zunino for the Mariners all hit a grand slam within the day. The previous record of six slams was set on May 21, 2000, when Garret Anderson (Angels), J. T. Snow (Giants), Brian Hunter (Phillies), Jason Giambi (Athletics), and Adrián Beltré along with Shawn Green (both with Dodgers) all contributed to the record.
- June 6 – Scooter Gennett became the 17th player in Major League Baseball history to hit four home runs in a single game, which included a grand slam, driving in 10 runs in as well in a 13–1 rout of the Cincinnati Reds over the St. Louis Cardinals at Great American Ballpark. Gennett, who singled in the first inning, also stands alone as the only big leaguer ever to have four home runs, 10 RBI and five hits in a single game. Additionally, he also became the first player in Reds history to hit four homers in a game.
- June 8 – Pitcher Claire Eccles made her debut for the Victoria HarbourCats of the West Coast League, becoming the first female to play in the WCL. She entered in relief against the Wenatchee Applesox and pitched two innings, giving up one hit, one walk, and two runs.
- June 11 – Washington Nationals pitching ace Max Scherzer recorded his 2,000th career strikeout and did it in the third fewest innings of any pitcher in Major League Baseball history. Scherzer completed the feat by striking out outfielder Nomar Mazara, the first batter he faced in the fourth inning of a game against the visiting Texas Rangers. At this point, Scherzer reached the 2,000 K's milestone in 1,784.0 innings of work, which placed him in third place behind Pedro Martínez (1,711 1/3 IP) and Randy Johnson (1,733 1/3 IP). Nevertheless, he was outpitched by Austin Bibens-Dirkx and took the loss as the Rangers beat the Nationals, 5–1.
- June 12 – The No 1 pick in the 2017 MLB draft belonged to the Minnesota Twins who selected shortstop Royce Lewis from JSerra High School in California.
- June 13 – The Minnesota Twins set a franchise record with 28 hits in a 20–7 victory over the Seattle Mariners at Target Field. Moreover, Eddie Rosario belted three home runs and drove in five runs. Jason Castro, Kennys Vargas and Rosario collected four hits apiece, while Eduardo Escobar tied a career high with five hits. Rosario also became the fifth player in Major League history to hit three home runs while batting ninth in the order as well as the seventh Twin to do it.
- June 14 – At a morning practice for the Congressional Baseball Game to be held the next day, a gunman opens fire on the Republican team, wounding House Majority Whip Steve Scalise, a staffer and two officers of the Capitol Police before being fatally injured by return fire from officers.
- June 25 – The 43-year-old center fielder Ichiro Suzuki was batting leadoff for the Miami Marlins for the first time this season in the Marlins' 4–2 victory over the visiting Chicago Cubs. As a result, Suzuki became the oldest big leaguer to start a game in center field since 1900, breaking the record held by Rickey Henderson, who was a month younger when he started in center for the Boston Red Sox in the 2002 season.
- June 27 – Adrián Beltré hit a solo home run in the ninth inning off reliever Cody Allen, to lead the Texas Rangers to a 3–2 victory over the host Cleveland Indians. With that blast, Beltré became the 39th player in Major League Baseball history to hit 450 career home runs, and also joins Albert Pujols and Miguel Cabrera as the only actives to get to 450 career homers. Overall, the 38-year-old Beltré is now just 33 hits away from his 3,000 hit, so he has a reasonable chance to reach the 3,000 hit club and the 500 home run club to form part of a select group that includes Hank Aaron, Willie Mays, Alex Rodriguez, Rafael Palmeiro and Eddie Murray.

=== July ===
- July 6 – At Busch Stadium, Japan native Ichiro Suzuki of the Miami Marlins becomes the Major League Baseball leader in hits by a player born outside the United States. In the second inning of the Marlins' 4–3 loss to the St. Louis Cardinals, Suzuki hits a line-drive single to left off pitcher Michael Wacha. He then singles in the eighth off Brett Cecil for his 3,054th career hit, surpassing Panama native Rod Carew for the most hits in MLB history for a foreign-born player.
- July 9 – The USA baseball team defeats the World team 7–6 in the All-Star Futures Game at Marlins Park in Miami, Florida. Brent Honeywell earned the Most Valuable Player honors.
- July 10 – Aaron Judge of the New York Yankees defeats Miguel Sanó of the Minnesota Twins, 11–10, during the championship round of the Home Run Derby held at Marlins Park.
- July 11 – Robinson Canó of the Seattle Mariners hits a solo homer in the top of the 10th inning, as the American League defeat the National League 2–1 in 10 innings, in the MLB All-Star Game played at Marlins Park. Canó was named the game's MVP.
- July 30 :
  - Former MLB commissioner Bud Selig and former players Jeff Bagwell, Tim Raines, and Iván Rodríguez were inducted into the Baseball Hall of Fame and Museum in Cooperstown, New York.
  - Texas Rangers third baseman Adrián Beltré became the 31st member of the select 3,000 hit club, after hitting a double off pitcher Wade Miley in the fourth inning of a 10–6 defeat to the Baltimore Orioles. A 20-year Major League veteran, Beltré also is the first player to reach the 3,000-hit feat while a member of the Rangers, as well as the first player born in the Dominican Republic to accomplish the milestone.
  - Andrew McCutchen hit three home runs to lead the Pittsburgh Pirates to a 7–1 victory over the San Diego Padres at Petco Park. It was the third career three-homer game for McCutchen, as he also went deep three times against the Washington Nationals at PNC Park on August 1, 2009, and against the Colorado Rockies at Coors Field on April 26, 2016.
- July 31 – At the trading deadline, the New York Mets sent relief pitcher Addison Reed to the Boston Red Sox in exchange for three pitching prospects. Additionally, the Oakland Athletics acquired infielder Adam Rosales from the Arizona Diamondbacks for a minor league player.

=== August ===
- August 6 – The Los Angeles Dodgers sweep the New York Mets in the seven games they played against each other this season.
- August 20 – The St. Louis Cardinals faced the Pittsburgh Pirates in Williamsport, Pennsylvania in a game that was sponsored by the Little League World Series tournament organization. The game was played at BB&T Ballpark and the Pirates defeated the Cardinals, 6–3.
- August 25 – The Players Weekend was held or the first time in Major League Baseball history. As a result, during the weekend all 30 teams in MLB wore colorful baseball uniforms based on youth sports designs. The event was designed to give players the opportunity to express their personal style on the back of their jerseys, and to acquaint hometown fans with newer team members.
- August 29 :
  - Due to heavy rains flooding in southeastern Texas as a result of Hurricane Harvey, the interleague series starting between the Houston Astros and Texas Rangers at Houston, Texas was played at Tropicana Field in St. Petersburg, Florida. The stands at Tropicana Field were mostly empty, with the home team dressed in the visitors clubhouse, while the road team wore white uniforms they usually wear at home. The three-game series was moved from Minute Maid Park with the Astros serving as the home team after the Rangers declined a proposal to play at their Globe Life Park in Arlington, Texas.
  - Chris Sale and two relievers combined on a four-hitter shutout, as the Boston Red Sox beat the Toronto Blue Jays, 3–0, at Rogers Centre. Sale finished the game with 11 strikeouts while running his record to 15–6 on the season. In addition, the Red Sox left-handed ace collected his season-best double-digit strikeout game, raising his league-leading total to 264, while becoming the first pitcher in major-league history to record 1,500 strikeouts in fewer than 1,300 career innings pitched. According to Elias Sports Bureau, Kerry Wood previously held the record, having reached 1,500 strikeouts in 1,303 innings.

=== September ===
- September 4 – J. D. Martinez became the 18th player in Major League Baseball history to hit four home runs in a game, powering the Arizona Diamondbacks to a 13–0 victory over the host Los Angeles Dodgers. Martinez is the second player with four homers in a game this season, joining Scooter Gennett, who accomplished his feat on past June 6. This is just the second season in major league history with multiple four-homer games, as Shawn Green and Mike Cameron did it in 2002. Besides, Martinez belted his first home run in the fourth inning and the other home runs in the last innings of the game, becoming the first player since the modern era began in 1900 to hit a homer in the seventh, eighth and ninth inning of the same game.
- September 7 – The Cleveland Indians beat the Chicago White Sox, 11–2, to set a franchise record with their 15th straight win. The last 11 of those victories came on the road, including sweeps of the New York Yankees (three games), Detroit Tigers (four games) and the aforementioned White Sox (four games). The 2016 Indians won 14 straight games in the first half en route to winning the American League pennant and, according to Elias Sports Bureau, it is just the fifth time in Major League history that a team has gone undefeated on a trip of 11 or more games. Besides, the 1953 Yankees had a 14–0 trip. It is also the longest winning streak in the majors since the Oakland Athletics won 20 consecutive games in its 2002 season.
- September 10 – The Washington Nationals became the first Major League Baseball club to officially clinch its berth in the 2017 postseason. With their 3–2 win over the Philadelphia Phillies at home, and the Miami Marlins' 10–8 loss to the Atlanta Braves at SunTrust Park, the Nationals clinched their fourth National League East Division title in the last six seasons. It is the first time the Nationals have won the NL East in consecutive seasons. They also captured the title in 2012 and 2014.
- September 11 – The New York Yankees beat the host Tampa Bay, 5–1, in the opener of a three-games series that was displaced from the Tropicana Field to Citi Field due to Hurricane Irma causing severe weather conditions throughout Florida.
- September 12 – Outfielder Mookie Betts hit two-run home runs and a two-run triple, as the Boston Red Sox rout the Oakland Athletics, 11–1, in the series opener at Fenway Park. In addition, Betts became the first player in Red Sox history to claim 20-plus homers and 20-plus stolen bases in back-to-back seasons.
- September 13 – The Cleveland Indians set an American League of 21 consecutive victories with a 5–3 win over the Detroit Tigers at Progressive Field. Only other two teams in the past 101 years have won that many consecutives games in Major League history. The previous night, Cleveland had defeated Detroit 2–0 to win their 20th straight game, tying the AL winning streak set by the 2002 Oakland Athletics, the longest streak in the post-expansion era. That team was immortalized in the book Moneyball and the popular film of the same name. Besides, the Indians joined the 1935 Chicago Cubs and put them within five wins of catching the 1916 New York Giants, who won 26 straight without a loss but whose 20th century mark includes a tie.
- September 14 – The Cleveland Indians extended its American League record with their 22nd consecutive win, sealing a 3–2 victory over the visiting Kansas City Royals. Cleveland also erased the mark for 21 consecutive games won with no ties, recorded by the Chicago Cubs in the 1935 season. With their historic win streak in jeopardy, the Indians rallied for a tying run in the bottom of the ninth inning and pulled off the winning streak first walk-off in the 10th, when Jay Bruce delivered n RBI-double that extended the streak going.
- September 15 – The Cleveland Indians' American League record-breaking winning streak stopped straight at 22 with a 4–3 loss to the Kansas City Royals at Progressive Field.
- September 16 – The Cleveland Indians earned their second straight American League Central Division championship, a first for the team since the 1998 and 1999 seasons. Coupled with an 8–4 victory over the Kansas City Royals at Progressive Field and the Toronto Blue Jays' 7–2 win over the Minnesota Twins at Target Field, the Indians have won nine AL Central titles since the division switched to the six-division format during the 1994 MLB season. No other team in the ALCD, which includes the Chicago White Sox, Twins, Detroit Tigers and Royals, have won more championships than the Indians.
- September 17 – The Houston Astros clinched their first American League West Division title and its first division title since 2001 when they played in the National League.
- September 20 – Chris Sale struck out 13 batters to become the first American League pitcher in 18 years to reach the 300 mark, and the Boston Red Sox earned a playoff berth by beating the Baltimore Orioles, 9–0, at Camden Yards. Pedro Martínez, also with the Red Sox recorded 313 in 1999. Overall, Sale notched the 35th 300 strikeout season in MLB history and joined Los Angeles Dodgers ace Clayton Kershaw as the only two pitchers to strikeout 300-plus batters in a season in the last 15 years. Kershaw did it in 2015. Previously, Curt Schilling and Randy Johnson both accomplished that feat as teammates with the Arizona Diamondbacks in 2002.
- September 22 – Detroit Tigers general manager Al Avila announced that Brad Ausmus will not be back as the team manager in the 2018 season. Ausmus posted a 314–332 record for the Tigers from 2014 to 2017. His four-year tenure included an AL Central title in his first season, but the Tigers generally underperformed since then.
- September 23 – The New York Yankees defeat the Toronto Blue Jays 5–1 to clinch their 53rd postseason berth in franchise history.
- September 25 – New York Yankees outfielder Aaron Judge hits his 49th and 50th home runs of the season to break the rookie record for home runs in a season set by Mark McGwire of the Oakland Athletics in 1987 as the Yankees beat the Kansas City Royals 11–3.
- September 27 :
  - In a conference call meeting, Major League Baseball owners approved the sale of the Miami Marlins club by Jeffrey Loria to a group headed by businessman Bruce Sherman and former New York Yankees player Derek Jeter.
  - The Chicago Cubs claimed they second straight National League Central title, by defeating the host St. Louis Cardinals, 5–1.
  - Later that night, the Minnesota Twins earned the second American League wild card berth, despite losing to the Cleveland Indians, after the Los Angeles Angels were eliminated by the Chicago White Sox in extra innings.
- September 29 – The Philadelphia Phillies announced that manager Pete Mackanin will not manage the team in 2018. Instead, Mackanin will move to a new role in the organization as a special assistant to general manager Matt Klentak. Mackanin posted a 174–238 record for the Phillies in all of part of three seasons spanning 2015–2017.
- September 30 :
  - The Boston Red Sox beat the Houston Astros, 6–3, at Fenway Park, to clinch the first back-to-back American League East titles in franchise history. With the win, the Red Sox avoided a possible tiebreaker against their direct rival New York Yankees. With the Boston win, the Yankees were left with a wild-card spot and a one-game matchup against the Minnesota Twins for the right to play against the Cleveland Indians in the best-of-five AL Division Series. Besides, the Boston victory set up an immediate rematch with the AL West champion Astros in the ALDS, starting on October 5 in Houston.
  - Later in the day, the Colorado Rockies clinched the second wild card berth, as the St. Louis Cardinals spoil the Milwaukee Brewers playoff hopes, with a 7–6 comeback win.
  - Andrew Romine of the Detroit Tigers became the fifth player in Major League history to play all nine positions in a single game, doing so against the Minnesota Twins at Target Field. Romine only spent a third of an inning, the only position he had never player before, but still managed to allow a passed ball. As a pitcher, Romine retired the only batter he faced, Miguel Sanó, to preserve a 3–2 lead in the eight inning and an eventual victory for Detroit.

=== October ===
- October 1 – New York Mets manager Terry Collins resigned after seven seasons with the team. Collins announced that he will remain with the Mets in a role in the team's front office.
- October 2 – Atlanta Braves general manager John Coppolella resigned at a time when the Atlanta team was under investigation by Major League Baseball for improprieties in the international amateur draft.
- October 3 – The New York Yankees beat the Minnesota Twins, 8–4, in the American League Wild Card Game. Four relievers gave up only one run, while combining for 26 outs to allow New York to advance to the American League Division Series to face the Cleveland Indians.
- October 4 – The Arizona Diamondbacks built an early 6–0 lead, then held on in thrilling fashion to beat the Colorado Rockies, 11–8, in the National League Wild Card Game. Arizona reliever Archie Bradley hit a stunning triple in the seventh inning, driving in two runs, as the Diamondbacks moved on to face the Los Angeles Dodgers in the National League Division Series.
- October 5 :
  - Jose Altuve hit three home runs to lead the Houston Astros to an 8–2 win over the Boston Red Sox in the Game 1 of their American League Division Series at Minute Maid Park. The diminutive 5-foot-6 Altuve blasted his first homer in the bottom of the first inning off Boston ace Chris Sale, putting the Astros out to an early 2–0 lead. The second came off Sale in the fifth, then completed the feat with a shot off reliever Austin Maddox in the bottom of the seventh. The Venezuelan second baseman became the 9th player in Major League history to hit three home runs in a postseason game and the first to do so since Pablo Sandoval did it for the San Francisco Giants in Game 1 of the 2012 World Series –– Babe Ruth did it twice. Justin Verlander pitched six effective innings and was credited with the win.
  - In the other ALDS, Trevor Bauer silenced the visiting New York Yankees, allowing just two hits and a walkover 6 2/3 innings while striking out eight, as the Cleveland Indians won Game 1 of the best-of-five series, 4–0. A two-run homer by Jay Bruce off Sonny Gray in the 4th inning was the big blow for the Indians. Andrew Miller and Cody Allen combined for 2 1/3 innings of relief, striking out six in the process. Only twice in their 381 postseason games have the Yankees struck out 14 times or more without scoring a run. The other came from Cliff Lee and Neftalí Feliz with the Texas Rangers in Game 3 of the 2010 ALCS (8–0, 15 Ks).
- October 6 :
  - For the second straight game, the Houston Astros started offense jumped on the Boston Red Sox and won Game 2 of the ALDS, 8–2. This time, Carlos Correa did the early damage with a two-run home run off Drew Pomeranz that scored previous hero Jose Altuve. And this time, the Red Sox would not battle back. Correa added a two-run double off Addison Reed that extinguished the last hopes of Boston, while George Springer hit a homer. Indians starter Dallas Keuchel pitched 5 2/3 innings of one-run ball and earned the win.
  - In the other ALDS, the New York Yankees took an early 8–3 lead over the Cleveland Indians with a two-run home run by Gary Sánchez and a three-run homer by Aaron Hicks, as they chased Indians ace starter Corey Kluber in the first three innings. Nevertheless, Cleveland came back in the game after Francisco Lindor smashed a grand slam in the sixth inning and Jay Bruce tied the game with a solo homer in the eight. Finally, Yan Gomes drove in Austin Jackson from second base with a single in the 13th inning to give Cleveland a 9–8 victory and a 2–0 lead in the best-of-five series.
  - In Game 1 of the NLDS, Kyle Hendricks outpitched Stephen Strasburg allowing only two hits in seven innings, to help the Chicago Cubs open defence of their first World Series title in 108 years by beating the host Washington Nationals 3–0. Kris Bryant and Anthony Rizzo produced RBI singles with two outs in the sixth inning, which were the first hits of the night off of Strasburg. Both runs were unearned, while Washington managed only two hits.
  - In the other NLDS game, the Los Angeles Dodgers beat the Arizona Diamondbacks, 9–5, before 54,707 fans at Dodger Stadium. The Dodgers scored four runs off Arizona starter Taijuan Walker in the first inning, three on a home run by Justin Turner. Clayton Kershaw was sharp in his start, striking out six of the first nine batters he faced and holding the Diamondbacks without a hit until there were two outs in the third inning. A. J. Pollock broke up the prospective no-hitter with a solo home run, and from there things got shakier for Kershaw, as he pitched only 6 1/3 innings and allowed five hits overall, four of them solo home runs. The Dodgers scored three more runs in the fourth and two in the eight to secure a 1–0 advantage in the best-of-five series.
- October 7 :
  - In Game 2 of the NLDS, the Chicago Cubs had a 3–1 lead over the host Washington Nationals in the 8th inning, backed by a solo home run from Wilson Contreras and a two-run shot by Anthony Rizzo, both off Nationals starter Gio González. But Washington erupted with five runs in the bottom of the inning and prevailed 8–3, while even the series at one apiece. Bryce Harper delivered a two-run homer and Ryan Zimmerman another good for three runs against reliever Carl Edwards, as all the scoring came on long balls. Previously, Anthony Rendon have homered off Jon Lester for the other Nationals run in the 1st inning.
  - In the other NLDS, the Los Angeles Dodgers took a 2–0 lead in the series with an 8–5 victory over the Arizona Diamondbacks. Having lost all three regular season games decisions to Arizona starter Robbie Ray, the Dodgers caught him this time on two days' rest, as he pitched in relief in Arizona's Wild Card victory. The Diamondbacks took a quick 2–0 lead on a two-run home run by Paul Goldschmidt off Rich Hill in the top of the first inning, but the Dodgers tied the game 2–2 in the fourth against Ray. Then, a four-run fifth against Ray and relievers Jimmie Sherfy and Jorge De La Rosa broke the game open. Ray stroke out six and did not allowed a hit until the fourth inning, but issued three walks, three wild pitches and hit a batter in 4 1/3 innings of work. Arizona pinch hitter Brandon Drury belted a three-run homer off Brandon Morrow in the 7th to make the score closer. The bottom of the Dodgers' batting order did the most damage, with Austin Barnes hitting a two-run double, Yasiel Puig driving in two runs, and Logan Forsythe collecting three hits and two runs scored. The Dodgers used seven pitchers, as Kenta Maeda took the win and Kenley Jansen was credited with the save.
- October 8 :
  - In Game 3 of the ALDS, the Boston Red Sox beat the Houston Astros at Fenway Park, 10–3, avoiding elimination in the best-of-five playoff set as well as a second straight postseason sweep. Hanley Ramírez went 4-for-4 with three RBI and 20-year-old Rafael Devers hit the go-ahead home run to make it 4–3, helping the Sox snap a five-game postseason losing streak overall. Besides, David Price pitched four scoreless innings of relief after Boston starter Doug Fister allowed three runs and did not complete the second inning, while Jackie Bradley Jr. smashed his first postseason homer – a three-run shot in a six-run seventh inning that put the game away. Devers, who turns 21 on October 24, became the youngest player in Red Sox history to homer in the postseason and one of only six players in Major League postseason history to hit a home run before their 21st birthday. The others are Mickey Mantle, Andruw Jones, Miguel Cabrera, Manny Machado and Bryce Harper, according to Elias Sports Bureau.
  - In the other ALDS, Masahiro Tanaka delivered a pitching gem and Greg Bird hit a solo home run off relief ace Andrew Miller in the sixth inning, and the New York Yankees edged the visiting Cleveland Indians, 1–0, avoiding a three-game sweep by the defending American League champions. Tanaka shutout the Cleveland offense on three hits through seven frames, striking out seven while issuing only a walk. Tanaka had some help from his defense, as right fielder Aaron Judge caught a Francisco Lindor drive in the opening of the sixth, taking a two-run homer away from the Indians shortstop. Closer Aroldis Chapman earned the save. Indians starter Carlos Carrasco gave up three hits and three walks while striking out seven over 5 2/3 scoreless innings.
- October 9 :
  - The Houston Astros rallied to beat the Boston Red Sox, 5–4, in Game 4 of the American League Division Series and won their first postseason series since 2005. Boston took a 3–2 lead in the fifth inning on a two-run home run by Andrew Benintendi off Justin Verlander, though, making his first relief appearance in a 13-year career. In the eighth, Alex Bregman tied it with a solo homer off Chris Sale, also an unexpected relief outing. Sale, who had logged four scoreless before the blast, was replaced by closer Craig Kimbrel later in the inning. Sale left with two out and one runner on. But Kimbrel walked his first batter, threw a wild pitch, and allowed an RBI-single to Carlos Beltrán that put the Astros ahead 4–3, before allowing a single to Josh Reddick inning, scoring Cameron Maybin with the eventual game-winning run. Rafael Devers hit an inside-the-park home run in the bottom of the ninth, but Ken Giles held on for the save to close out the series. Verlander won his second game of the series while Sale took two of the three losses of Boston.
  - In the other ALDS, the New York Yankees beat the Cleveland Indians, 7–3, to force a decisive fifth game in the series. Though Cleveland starter Trevor Bauer allowed no earned runs in the game, an error by third baseman Giovanny Urshela in the second inning sparked a four-run rally that punctuated the victory. Luis Severino pitched seven strong innings and was credited with the win, while closer Tommy Kahnle retired all six batters he faced, five of them by strikeouts, to earn the save. Cleveland batted only four hits, including a two-run home run by Carlos Santana in the fourth inning and a solo shot by Roberto Pérez in the fifth.
  - The Chicago Cubs defeated the Washington Nationals at Wrigley Field, 2–1, to take a 2–1 lead in the National League Division Series. Washington starter Max Scherzer pitched a no-hitter until one out in the seventh inning, when allowed a double to Ben Zobrist who scored the tying run in a single by Albert Almora. In the eight, Anthony Rizzo dropped a well-placed blooper between three players that drove the winning run to take a 2–1 lead in the NLDS. Daniel Murphy scored the only run of the Nationals in the sixth on a double by Ryan Zimmerman.
  - In the other NLDS match up, the Los Angeles Dodgers completed a three-game shutout of the Arizona Diamondbacks at Chase Field, 3–1, earning their third trip to the National League Championship Series in five years. Dodgers starter Yu Darvish allowed just a Ketel Marte bunt single and a solo home run by Daniel Descalso in five innings of work, with seven strikeouts and no walks. Solo homers by Cody Bellinger and Austin Barnes set the tone for the Dodgers offense, while four relievers took care of the final four innings, with Kenley Jansen earning the save. Zack Greinke was the losing pitcher. He allowed three runs on four hits and five walks, while striking out four in five innings.
- October 11 – The Boston Red Sox announced that John Farrell will not return as manager in the 2018 season. Overall, Farrell spent nine seasons with the Red Sox from 2013 through 2017. He posted a 432–374 record, guiding the team to three American League Division titles and the 2013 World Series championship. He also served as the Sox pitching coach from 2007 to 2010, including the 2007 World Series champion team. In between, he managed the Toronto Blue Jays in 2011 and 2012, going 154–170.
- October 11 :
  - In Game 4 of the National League Division Series, Michael A. Taylor smashed a grand slam home run in the eighth inning and the Washington Nationals kept their playoff title hopes alive by defeating the defending World Series champion Chicago Cubs, 5–0, at Wrigley Field. Nationals pitcher Stephen Strasburg, who collected his first playoff win, struck out 12 and surrendered only three hits with two walks over seven shutout innings. The Nationals will play in their third NLDS Game 5 since 2012, looking to advance to the National League Championship Series for the first time in Washington history. Chicago will be looking to advance to its third straight NLCS, and the winner will travel to Los Angeles to face the Dodgers in Game 1 of the NLCS.
  - In a later game, the New York Yankees advanced to the American League Championship Series with a 5–2 victory over the defending American League champion Cleveland Indians. Didi Gregorius hit a solo home run and a two-run homer in his first two plate appearances, both off Indians ace Corey Kluber, to give the Yankees an early lead. Yankees starter CC Sabathia took a shutout in the fifth, but was removed after giving four straight singles and two runs with one out. David Robertson relieved and pitched 2 2/3 scoreless innings for the win and Aroldis Chapman got the last six outs for the save. The Yankees advanced to the ALCS for the first time since 2012, when they were swept by the Detroit Tigers in four games. The Yankees will face the Houston Astros in Game 1 of the best-of-seven series at Minute Maid Park on October 13. They went 2–5 against the Astros in the regular season.
- October 12 – The Chicago Cubs advanced to the National League Championship Series with a thrilling 9–8 victory over the Washington Nationals in Game 5 of the NLDS at Nationals Park. The Cubs took an early 1–0 lead off starter Gio González in the first inning, but Washington came back with four runs in the second against Kyle Hendricks, three of them coming on a Michael A. Taylor home run. Daniel Murphy also homered in the inning. The Cubs then trimmed their deficit with two runs in the third and explode for four runs in the fifth to grab a 7–4 lead that never relinquished. Matt Albers relieved González and pitched a scoreless inning, but Max Scherzer came on the fifth and, after two quick outs retiring sluggers Kris Bryant and Anthony Rizzo, allowed four runs – two earned – on three hits, one walk, an error by catcher's interference and a hit batter. The Cubs used six relievers, including starter José Quintana, with closer Wade Davis getting the final seven outs and the save. Reliever Brian Duensing was credited with the win and Scherzer was the loser. Addison Russell hit a pair of doubles and drove in four of the Cubs nine runs. The defending World Series champions will next face the Dodgers in a rematch of the 2016 National League Championship Series with Game 1 slated to start on October 14 at Dodger Stadium.
- October 13 :
  - For the first time in Major League Baseball history, the final four teams competing for the World Series in the divisional series are from the four largest US cities.
  - Dallas Keuchel pitched an impeccable game, as the Houston Astros beat the New York Yankees, 2–1, in Game 1 of the American League Championship Series at Minute Maid Park. Keuchel stroke one 10 batters over seven scoreless innings, giving up four singles and only one walk. The Astros scored a pair of runs against Yankees starter Masahiro Tanaka in the fifth inning, on RBI singles by Carlos Correa and Yuli Gurriel, while New York's lone run came on a solo home run by Greg Bird off closer Ken Giles with two outs in the ninth inning. It was the first time since 2005 that the Astros hosted a Championship Series Game.
- October 14 :
  - The Houston Astros defeated the visiting New York Yankees, 2–1, in Game 2 of the ALCS. Justin Verlander pitched nine stellar innings and Carlos Correa drove in both Houston runs, as the Astros took command of the best-of-seven series with a walk-off victory. Verlander gave up five hits and one run in his complete-game victory, while striking out 13 and walking just one on 124 pitches. The Astros opened the score in the fifth inning when Correa hit a home run off Luis Severino that landed just to the deep right field line. A short time after, the Yankees tied in the fifth with an RBI double from Todd Frazier that scored Aaron Hicks. Then in the bottom of the ninth, Correa sent home Jose Altuve with the game winning run after hitting a one-out double off to right-center off Aroldis Chapman. Altuve, who had singled against Chapman, raced around the bases and slid safe at home as catcher Gary Sánchez fumbled with the relay throw. Houston put New York in a 0–2 hole in the best-of-seven series, after winning the first two games with the same score.
  - The Los Angeles Dodgers took over the Chicago Cubs, 5–2, in Game 1 of the National League Championship Series at Dodger Stadium. Dodgers ace Clayton Kershaw and Cubs starter José Quintana matched zeroes during the first three innings, but what looked destined to be a classical pitching duel turned into an easy Dodgers victory. Kershaw allowed a two-run home run to Albert Almora, who parked it in the left field bleachers to open the scoring in the fourth. Quintana, meanwhile, issued back-to-back walks with one out in the fifth, as Yasiel Puig hit a double to drive in Los Angeles' first run. Charlie Culberson tied the score with a sacrifice fly. Both starters left the game with two runs allowed over five innings. In the bottom of the sixth Chris Taylor put the Dodgers ahead, 3–2, with a solo home run off Cubs reliever Héctor Rondón. Puig added other run with a solo homer off Mike Montgomery in the seventh. After tallying five hits against Kershaw, the Cubs would get only one baserunner off five Dodgers relievers. Kenta Maeda pitched one scoreless inning and was credited with the win, while closer Kenley Jansen got the save.
- October 15 – Justin Turner hit a walk-off three-run home run off John Lackey to deep center field in the bottom of the ninth inning, which broke a 1–1 tie between the Los Angeles Dodgers and Chicago Cubs to end a closely fought NLCS Game 2 at Dodger Stadium. The Turner blast came exactly 29 years after Kirk Gibson belted his legendary walk-off homer off Dennis Eckersley in Game 1 of the 1988 World Series. As a result, the Dodgers placed two wins away from returning to the World Series for the first time since that championship season. Besides, Turner also had an RBI-single in the fifth to drive in all the Dodgers' runs. Addison Russell homered in the fifth for the only Cubs run. Dodgers closer Kenley Jansen got the win with a hitless ninth. Game 3 was scheduled for October 17 at Wrigley Field.
- October 16 – After losing the first two games of the ALCS, the New York Yankees routed the visiting Houston Astros, 8–1, to take Game 3 and get back in the best-of-seven series. Todd Frazier hit a three-run home run off Charlie Morton on a line over the right field fence in the bottom of the second inning. So did Aaron Judge, who belted a three-run homer off Will Harris that capped the Yankees' five-run fourth. After that, Collin McHugh silenced the Yankees bats, pitching four hitless innings in relief and striking out three. 37-year-old pitcher CC Sabathia delivered a solid start, limiting the Astros to three hits and four walks while striking out five over six innings. In 13 starts following a Yankees loss this year, Sabathia accumulated a 10–0 record with a 1.69 ERA, including the postseason.
- October 17 :
  - The New York Yankees rallied from a late 4–0 deficit to beat the Houston Astros, 6–4, in Game 4 of the ALCS. Houston starter Lance McCullers was in prime form in the game, blanking the Yankees on one hit through six innings before giving up a home run to Aaron Judge leading off the seventh. After that, Didi Gregorius hit a triple off reliever Chris Devenski before scoring on a Gary Sánchez sacrifice fly. In the eight, Houston closer Ken Giles was summoned and asked to get a six-out save, but Giles allowed two singles and Brett Gardner cut the Astros lead to one with an RBI groundout. That set up Judge to tie the game with an RBI double, while Sánchez gave the Yankees their first lead with a two-run RBI double. Yankees starter Sonny Gray allowed two runs of one hit in five plus innings, and reliever David Robertson gave a run in one inning. Robertson was followed by Chad Green, who allowed one run in two innings and get the win. Aroldis Chapman got the final three outs to record the save. For Houston, Yuli Gurriel drilled a bases-clearing double in the top of the sixth inning, giving the Astros a 3–0 lead. In the seventh, Marwin González scored a run on an error by Yankees second baseman Starlin Castro. Giles was credited for the loss. The Yankees tied the series at two apiece and remained undefeated at Yankee Stadium this postseason, heading into a crucial confrontation in Game 5 at home.
  - The Los Angeles Dodgers rolled to a 6–1 victory over the Chicago Cubs at Wrigley Field to take a commanding 3–0 lead in the best-of-seven NLCS, moving one win from their first World Series since 1988. Yu Darvish pitched 6 1/3 innings to earn the win, striking out seven and allowing only one walk and six hits before turning the game over to the Dodgers' bullpen. Kyle Schwarber hit a long first-inning home run off Darvish to give the Cubs an early 1–0 lead, but Andre Ethier homered off Cubs starter Kyle Hendricks in the top of the second to even the score. Then Chris Taylor put Los Angeles ahead in the third with a solo homer of his own, and added a run-scoring triple in the fifth to make to score 3–1. Afterwards, Darvish helped his own cause with a bases-loaded RBI in the top of the sixth inning. The Dodgers scored two more runs in the eight on a passed ball and a sacrifice fly by Kyle Farmer. In the ninth inning, closer Kenley Jansen entered the game with two runners on and nobody out. Jansen stroke out two and retired the side in order, as Los Angeles bullpen extended its postseason scoreless streak to 16 2/3 innings. The Dodgers, who swept the Arizona Diamondbacks in the best-of-five NLDS, set a franchise record with six straight wins in postseason games.
- October 18 :
  - Masahiro Tanaka pitched seven brilliant innings to defeat Dallas Keuchel and the Houston Astros, while the New York Yankees came away with a 5–0 victory in Game 5 of the ALCS at Yankee Stadium. Tanaka looked dominant on the mound, as he spaced three hits and gave one walk, while striking out eight batters. Greg Bird delivered an RBI-single in the second inning that represented the first run the Yankees had scored off Keuchel in 14 2/3 postseason innings, including seven scoreless innings during Game 1 of the series and five shutout innings in the 2015 AL Wild Card Game. The attack on Keuchel continued in the third, when Aaron Judge drove in his 10th RBI of the postseason with a double before Gary Sánchez and Didi Gregorius added RBI singles in the fifth. In addition, Sánchez hit his third postseason home run off reliever Brad Peacock in the seventh. Overall, Keuchel lost for the first time in five career postseason starts. The Yankees took a 3–2 lead in the best-of-seven series and positioned a win away from their first World Series appearance since 2009.
  - The Chicago Cubs staved off elimination with a 3–2 victory over the Los Angeles Dodgers in Game 4 of the NLCS at Wrigley Field. Coming out of a 0-for-20 slump, Javier Báez hit two solo home runs and Willson Contreras also hit a solo homer of his own, as the Cubs trimmed their series deficit to 3–1. Besides, Cody Bellinger and Justin Turner each hit solo home runs for the Dodgers in the third and eight innings, respectively. Jake Arrieta allowed three hits and stroke out nine in 6 2/3 innings for the win, in what may have been the soon-to-be free agent's final appearance for Chicago. Closer Wade Davis allowed one run in two innings of relief and was credited with the save. Dodgers pitcher Alex Wood, who allowed three homers and a single in 4 2/3 innings, was making his first career postseason start. The loss snapped a six-game postseason win streak for the Dodgers, which remains one victory shy of reaching the World Series for the first time since 1988.
- October 19 – The Los Angeles Dodgers beat the Chicago Cubs in Game 5 of the NLCS at Wrigley Field, 11–1, heading to the World Series for the first time in 29 years. Enrique Hernández, a valuable and versatile utility man, slugged three home runs, including a grand slam and seven runs batted in. Clayton Kershaw exhibited his usual dominance, as he held Chicago to one run and three hits while striking out five across six innings and 89 pitches before turning over the Dodgers' bullpen. Los Angeles scored their first run early in the game with an RBI-double by Cody Bellinger off Cubs starter José Quintana in the first inning. Hernández added other run with a solo homer in the second. The Dodgers would chase Quintana in the third, when he allowed an RBI-single to Justin Turner and Hernández came up with the bases loaded against reliever Héctor Rondón, as the Puerto Rican utility went deep for the second time in as many innings on a grand slam off Rondón that gave the Dodgers an insurmountable 7–0 lead. Logan Forsythe hit a two-RBI double in the fourth and Hernández belted a two-run home run for good measure. The only run for the Cubs came on a solo homer by Kris Bryant in the fourth inning. Hernández, who had seen only five at-bats in the series, became just the 10th player to hit three home runs in a postseason game and the first to drive in many runs in a League Championship game. He also was the first to reach both feats in any postseason game. In addition, Chris Taylor and Justin Turner were voted co-MVPs of the series. The Dodgers will meet either the Houston Astros or New York Yankees in the World Series, which was slated to start in Los Angeles on October 24.
- October 20 :
  - Justin Verlander continued his masterful pitching in elimination postseason games and Jose Altuve drove in three runs, as the resurgent Houston Astros beat the New York Yankees, 7–1, in Game 6 of the American League Championship Series at Minute Maid Park. The slumping Astros had scored just nine runs in the series. With their victory, the Astros forced a decisive Game 7 for the right to face the Los Angeles Dodgers in the World Series. Through seven innings, Verlander silenced the potent Yankees offense for the second time in the series, allowing five hits and issuing one walk while recording eight strikeouts, extending his streak of consecutive scoreless innings in elimination games to 24. Yankees starter Luis Severino and Verlander matched zeroes since the beginning. While Verlander allowed a hit in each of his first three innings, Severino kept the Astros hitless until Carlos Correa lined a two-out single in the bottom of the fourth. But the Astros chased Severino in the fifth, when Brian McCann delivered an RBI-double and Altuve hit a two-run single for a 3–0 lead. Severino lasted only 4 2/3 innings. After that, Houston broke through with four insurance runs. Altuve belted a solo home run off reliever David Robertson, his fourth of the postseason, leading off the eighth inning, while Yuli Gurriel added a two-run RBI double and Evan Gattis made the score 7–1 with a sacrifice fly. Yankees rookie Aaron Judge clubbed his fourth homer of the postseason off Houston reliever Brad Peacock in the eighth inning.
  - Ron Gardenhire agreed to a three-year deal to become the Detroit Tigers next manager. Gardenhire previously managed the AL Central Division rival Minnesota Twins from 2002 through 2014 and most recently served as the Arizona Diamondbacks bench coach.
  - The Washington Nationals announced that Dusty Baker will not return as the team's manager for the next season. Baker joined the Nationals by signing a two-year deal before the 2016 season, but the two sides had reportedly been discussing the possibility of a new contract prior to the announcement.
- October 21 – The Houston Astros advanced to the World Series after defeating the New York Yankees, 4–0, in Game 7 of the American League Championship Series at Minute Maid Park. The Astros, who rallied from a 3–2 deficit in the best-of-seven series, returned to the World Series for the first time since 2005. As for Game 7 of the ALCS, Charlie Morton pitched five shutout innings, allowing two singles and a walk while striking out five. Morton was clearly efficient, needing only 57 pitches, 37 of them for strikes. Lance McCullers relieved Morton in the sixth inning, and he would go four scoreless innings. McCullers allowed only a single and one walk while striking out six and picking up the save in the pennant decider. It was his first save in his major league career. Previously, McCullers started Game 4 of the series and blanked the Yankees on one hit through six innings before giving up a home run to Aaron Judge leading off the seventh. This time, Evan Gattis opened the scoring by leading off the fourth inning with a home run off Yankees starter CC Sabathia. Then with one out on the fifth, Jose Altuve hit his fifth homer of the postseason off reliever Tommy Kahnle. Later in the inning, Brian McCann delivered a two-run RBI double for a definitive 4–0 lead. Kahnle, who have had an excellent postseason, entered Game 7 with a 0.00 ERA, 0.40 WHIP and nine strikeouts in 10 postseason innings. Nevertheless, in the fifth was punished with three runs on four hits in two-thirds of an inning. Sabathia, who was 10–0 this season after a Yankees loss, lasted just 3 1/3 innings and got the loss after allowing a run on five hits and three walks without a strikeout. Justin Verlander was honored as the Most Valuable Player of the Series. The Astros advanced to take on the Los Angeles Dodgers on the annual MLB championship series, which starts in Dodger Stadium on October 24.
- October 23 :
  - The Boston Red Sox announced that they have hired Houston Astros bench coach Alex Cora as their next manager. Boston gave Cora a three-year contract with a club option for 2021. Cora played for the Red Sox from 2005 through 2008, and is in his first season in a Major League Baseball role. The team will hold a press conference to introduce Cora after the World Series between Houston and the Los Angeles Dodgers concludes.
  - The New York Mets named Cleveland Indians pitching coach Mickey Callaway as their new manager, offering him a three-year contract. While at Cleveland, Callaway converted the Indians pitching staff in one of the most consistent in Major League Baseball. Since he joined the organization in 2013, Callahan pitched for the Tampa Bay Devil Rays and the Anaheim Angels, and also coached for the Texas Rangers, Angels and Rays.
- October 24 - The Los Angeles Dodgers won Game 1 of the World Series over the Houston Astros at Dodger Stadium, 3–1, behind solid pitching by Clayton Kershaw to take a 1–0 series lead.
- October 25 – The Houston Astros beat the host Los Angeles Dodgers, 7–6, in 11 innings in Game 2 to tie the World Series.
- October 26 – The New York Yankees announced they would not bring Joe Girardi back as their manager in 2018, following a season in which he oversaw a young team that came within a game of the World Series. The Yankees had notified the previous week that Girardi would not return as manager in 2018, opting instead to allow his contract to expire.
- October 27 - The Houston Astros defeated the Los Angeles Dodgers at Minute Maid Park, 5–3, to take a 2–1 advantage in the World Series.
- October 28 – The Los Angeles Dodgers beat the host Houston Astros, 6–2, and evened the World Series at 2-2.
- October 29 – The Houston Astros came from behind three times to beat the visiting Los Angeles Dodgers, 13–12, in 10 innings in Game 5 of the World Series to take a 3–2 series lead. With their victory, the Astros became only the second team in history to overcome multiple three-run deficits in the same World Series game. Besides, they became the first team with five different players – Yuli Gurriel, Jose Altuve, George Springer, Carlos Correa, Brian McCann – to homer in the same Series game.
- October 30 :
  - The Washington Nationals formally announced the signing of Dave Martinez as the team's next manager. This will be his first managerial role. Martinez agreed to a three-year deal with a club option for the 2021 season. Previously, Martinez served as the bench coach for Joe Maddon with the Chicago Cubs the past three seasons and with the Tampa Bay Rays for seven years before that.
  - The Philadelphia Phillies hired Gabe Kapler as their new manager. Kapler, a former major league outfielder for the Boston Red Sox, came from the Los Angeles Dodgers organization, where he served as director of player development the past three years.
- October 31 – The Los Angeles Dodgers beat the Houston Astros at Dodger Stadium, 3–1, to even the World Series and force a deciding Game 7.

=== November ===
- November 1 – The Houston Astros defeated the Los Angeles Dodgers in Game 7 of the World Series at Dodger Stadium, 5–1, to claim their first World Series championship in 56 years of franchise history. Astros outfielder George Springer received World Series MVP honors. Springer, who hit his fifth home run of the series, tied a record set by Reggie Jackson for the New York Yankees in 1977 and matched by Chase Utley with the Philadelphia Phillies in 2009. In addition, Springer became the first player to homer in four consecutive games during a World Series and set series records for the most extra bases (8) and total bases (29), according to ESPN Stats.
- November 2 – The Boston Red Sox hired Hall of Fame manager Tony La Russa as vice president, special assistant to the president of baseball operations, Dave Dombrowski. La Russa will assist Dombrowski in all areas of baseball operations, including player development and consultation with the major and minor league coaching staffs.
- November 4 – The Fukuoka SoftBank Hawks win the 2017 Japan Series for their fourth series title in seven years, topping the Yokohama DeNA BayStars 4 games to 2. Dennis Sarfate, who saved two wins and pitched three innings for the victory, was named the Series MVP. It is the first time American players have won back-to-back Japan Series MVP honors, as Brandon Laird did it in 2016.
- November 7 – Future Hall of Fame pitcher Roy Halladay is killed when his ICON A5 aircraft crashes into the Gulf of Mexico off the coast of Florida.
- November 13 :
  - Carlos Beltrán announced his retirement from baseball after a 20-year Major League career from 1998 through 2017. A nine-time All-Star outfielder, Beltrán won a World Series ring with the Houston Astros this season to close out his career in a good situation and on his own terms. The win comes for a time of healing for the city of Houston which was recovering from Hurricane Harvey.
  - All nine of the Major League Baseball free agents that received a one-year, $17.4MM qualifying offer, rejected that offer in favor of free agency. Each of Jake Arrieta, Lorenzo Cain, Alex Cobb, Wade Davis, Greg Holland, Eric Hosmer, Lance Lynn, Mike Moustakas and Carlos Santana, turned down that one-year opportunity in search of a multi-year pact in free agency. The nine players will have three days to make their decisions official.
  - The Atlanta Braves announced the hire of Alex Anthopoulos as their new executive vice president and general manager. Anthopoulos signed a four-year contract and will report directly to Braves CEO Terry McGuirk. Previously, Anthopoulus served as the Los Angeles Dodgers' vice president of player development since ending his long stint as the Toronto Blue Jays' GM after the 2015 season. Anthopoulos and Atlanta agreed to terms on a four-year contract that will run through the 2021 season.
  - The San Diego Padres and Los Angeles Dodgers will play a three-game regular-season series in Mexico next season. The games, hosted by San Diego, will take place from May 4–6 at Estadio de Béisbol Monterrey, which mark the first MLB regular-season contests in Mexico since 1999.
- November 17 – John Hart stepped down from his role as Atlanta Braves president of baseball operations, amid an investigation by Major League Baseball into violations related to both the domestic amateur draft and the international signing market.

=== December ===
- December 4 – The Aaron Boone hiring was finalized by the New York Yankees, who gave the ESPN broadcaster a three-year contract to succeed Joe Girardi as manager. Boone, who never managed or coached in the majors or minors, signed a three-year deal that includes a team option for 2021. Moreover, Boone became the first person hired by the Yankees to become their manager with no previous coaching or managing experience since Bill Dickey back in the team's 1946 season.
- December 8 – Japanese star Shohei Ohtani agreed to sign with the Los Angeles Angels, according to his agent Nez Balelo. Ohtani, a pitcher with a triple-digit fastball as well as a slugging outfielder, had met previously with the Chicago Cubs, Los Angeles Dodgers, San Diego Padres, San Francisco Giants, Seattle Mariners and Texas Rangers. In a five-season career, the 23-year old posted a record of 42–15 with a 2.52 ERA and a 1.08 WHIP in 85 pitching appearances of the Hokkaido Nippon-Ham Fighters, along with a slash line of.286/.358/.500 with 48 home runs and 166 RBI in 403 games during that span.
- December 9 – The New York Yankees obtained outfielder Giancarlo Stanton from the Miami Marlins, agreeing to assume all but $30 million of his 10-year, $295 million contract, while giving up infielder Starlin Castro and the remaining $22 million in his deal along with two minor league prospects. As a result, the Marlins agreed to send the Yankees $30MM in cash if Stanton does not opt out of his contract after the 2020 season.
- December 10 – Jack Morris and Alan Trammell were both elected to the Baseball Hall of Fame. Two of the greatest players to ever wear a Detroit Tigers uniform, they were voted by the 16-person Modern Era Committee, who weighed the cases of Morris, Trammell and eight other players who were not originally selected in the traditional Baseball Writers' Association Of America ballot without getting the necessary 75% of the vote necessary for election in 15 years. The committee members were allowed to vote for a maximum of four of the 10 candidates. In this case, a candidate must have appeared on at least 12 of the 16 ballots. Morris was named on 14 out of 16 ballots, while Trammell appeared in 14 ballots. The Modern Era Committee focused on names from 1970 to 1987, with other candidates including MLBPA executive director Marvin Miller and former players Steve Garvey, Tommy John, Don Mattingly, Dale Murphy, Dave Parker, Ted Simmons and Luis Tiant. Simmons came closest to induction, falling just a single vote shy of the 12-vote threshold. Miller was the next-highest candidate, earning seven of 16 votes (43.8%), while Garvey, John, Mattingly, Murphy, Parker and Tiant each received fewer than seven votes.
- December 16 – In a creative financial move, the Los Angeles Dodgers sent Adrián González, Charlie Culberson, Scott Kazmir and Brandon McCarthy to the Atlanta Braves in exchange for Matt Kemp. The Braves also received $4.5MM in cash. As a result, the swap put the Dodgers below the $197MM luxury tax and will allow the organization to reset the escalating luxury tax penalties for the 2018 season, which was a significant objective for the club this offseason. The money owed to Kemp is spread out across the 2018–2019 seasons, as the Dodgers would be paying him his salary even if he does not appear in a game. As for Atlanta, while Culberson is a highly touted rookie, González, Kazmir and McCarthy all have just one year remaining on their contracts. Furthermore, the Braves immediately designated González for assignment and placed him on waivers.
- December 27 – The Liga de Béisbol Profesional Roberto Clemente of Puerto Rico, which seemed vulnerable to cancellation in the wake of the devastation wrought by Hurricane Maria, was set to start an abbreviated schedule on January 4, 2018. Four of the five LBPRC teams agreed to compete in an abbreviated 18-game schedule – Cangrejeros de Santurce, Criollos de Caguas, Gigantes de Carolina and Indios de Mayagüez. Due to financial difficulties, the Tiburones de Aguadilla were to join the Indios. Given the uncertainty over the power grid, the RCPBL was forced to play day games – at 1:30 p.m. on Thursdays and Fridays and 1 p.m., as well as double-headers on Saturdays and Sundays. The games were scheduled to be played from January 6–31 at Hiram Bithorn Stadium in San Juan and Isidoro García Stadium in Mayagüez.
- December 31 – The Seattle Mariners were given the longest postseason drought in professional sports after the Buffalo Bills of the National Football League made the playoffs for the first time since 1999. The Mariners' last postseason run was in 2001.

== Deaths ==
=== January ===
- January 2 – Daryl Spencer, 88, middle infielder and third baseman who played from 1952 through 1963 for four different National League clubs, most prominently with the Giants teams based in New York and San Francisco, while becoming the first player to hit a home run in San Francisco Giants history, which was also the first Major League home run hit in the Pacific Time Zone, a solo shot off Los Angeles Dodgers pitcher Don Drysdale in the opening game between Dodgers and Giants.
- January 3 – Rosemary Stevenson, 80, outfielder for the Grand Rapids Chicks of the All-American Girls Professional Baseball League in its final season of operation in 1954.
- January 4 – Art Pennington, 93, Negro league baseball All Star in the 1940s, who played for the Chicago American Giants and Birmingham Black Barons, as well as in the Minors, Mexican League, and Cuban and Venezuelan winter ball.
- January 6 – Greg Jelks, 55, African-American ballplayer and Australian baseball legend, who also played briefly for the Philadelphia Phillies in its 1987 season.
- January 6 – Bob Sadowski, 79, third baseman and corner outfielder who played for the St. Louis Cardinals, Philadelphia Phillies, Chicago White Sox and Los Angeles Angels in a span of four seasons from 1960 to 1963.
- January 7 – Bill Champion, 69, pitcher for the Philadelphia Phillies and Milwaukee Brewers in eight seasons from 1969 to 1976, as well as a two-time earned run average leader in the Phillies minor league system, while leading all pitchers in both the Northern League in 1965 (1.20 ERA) and the Carolina League in 1968 (2.03).
- January 7 – Mildred Meacham, 92, All-American Girls Professional Baseball League player.
- January 7 – Dan Porter, 85, outfielder who played briefly for the Washington Senators in its 1951 season.
- January 8 – Jackie Brown, 73, pitcher for the Washington Senators, Texas Rangers, Cleveland Indians and Montreal Expos in seven seasons between 1970 and 1977, who later worked as a pitching coach for the Rangers from 1979 to 1982 and had stints in that role for the Chicago White Sox (1992–95) and Tampa Bay Rays (2002), before becoming a successfully minor league pitching coach and coordinator for a significant number of organizations.
- January 16 – Dan O'Brien Sr., 87, front office executive who spent almost 40 years in baseball from 1955 to 1993, including stints as general manager for the Texas Rangers, Seattle Mariners and California Angels; father of executive Dan Jr.
- January 18 – Red Adams, 95, pitcher for the 1946 Chicago Cubs and a 19-year Minor League veteran between 1939 and 1958, who later became a successful pitching coach with the Los Angeles Dodgers from 1969 through 1980; prior to that, a Dodger scout and minor-league instructor for 11 years.
- January 18 – Harry Minor, 88, legendary scout and New York Mets Hall of Fame member, who was an integral part of the 1969 and 1986 Mets teams that won World Series titles.
- January 18 – Dick Starr, 95, pitcher for the New York Yankees, St. Louis Browns and Washington Senators from 1947 to 1951, who previously served on active duty in World War II and earned three Bronze Stars, a Good Conduct Medal and numerous campaign ribbons.
- January 19 – Walt Streuli, 81, backup catcher who played for the Detroit Tigers from 1954 to 1956.
- January 21 – Ken Wright, 70, long-reliever and spot-starter who pitched from 1970 through 1974 for the Kansas City Royals and New York Yankees.
- January 22 – Andy Marte, 33, versatile infielder who played for the Cleveland Indians, Atlanta Braves and Arizona Diamondbacks over part of six seasons spanning 2005–2014, in a 16-season career that included stints at all levels in the United States, South Korea and his native Dominican Republic.
- January 22 – Yordano Ventura, 25, Dominican Republic pitcher for the Kansas City Royals from 2013 through 2016, and member of the 2015 World Series Championship team.
- January 24 – Morris Nettles, 64, outfielder who played for the California Angels from 1974 to 1975.
- January 27 – Bob Bowman, 86, right fielder and relief pitcher for the Philadelphia Phillies from 1955 to 1959, a solid defender at outfield, and also a reliable pinch-hitter for the late innings.

=== February ===
- February 1 – Mark Brownson, 41, pitcher who played for the Colorado Rockies and Philadelphia Phillies in a span of three seasons from 1998 to 2000.
- February 10 – Mike Ilitch, 87, entrepreneur, founder and owner of the international fast food franchise Little Caesars Pizza, who also owned the Detroit Red Wings of the National Hockey League since 1982 and the Detroit Tigers of Major League Baseball since 1992.
- February 19 – Harry MacPherson, 90, pitcher for the Boston Braves in 1944, who at 17 was one of the youngest players to be signed by a Major League club during World War II; threw one scoreless inning in his only MLB game.
- February 26 – Ned Garver, 91, All-Star pitcher who recorded 129 victories in his 14-year major league career, despite playing for some of baseball's worst teams between the late 1940s and 1950s, while leading the American League in complete games in 1950 (22) and 1951 (24), and winning his 20th game on the last day of the 1951 season for the humble St. Louis Browns, to become the first pitcher in major league history to win 20 games for a team which lost 100 games.

=== March ===
- March 1 – Shirley Palesh, 87, outfielder who played for three teams in the All-American Girls Professional Baseball League from 1949 to 1950.
- March 9 – Bill Hands, 76, pitcher who spent 11 seasons in the majors between 1965 and 1975, including seven years with the Chicago Cubs from 1966 to 1972 and short stints with the San Francisco Giants, Minnesota Twins, and Texas Rangers, while posting an overall record of 111–110 with a 3.35 ERA in 374 games, and reaching the 20-win plateau in 1969.
- March 14 – Arleene Johnson, 93, Canadian infielder who played from 1945 through 1948 in the All-American Girls Professional Baseball League.
- March 15 – Bob Bruce, 83, pitcher for the Detroit Tigers, Houston Colt .45s/Astros, and Atlanta Braves in a span of nine seasons from 1959 to 1967, who in 1964 became the seventh National League pitcher and the 12th pitcher in major-league history to thrown an immaculate inning by striking out all three batters in an inning on nine total pitches, just one day after the Los Angeles Dodgers' Sandy Koufax achieved the same feat.
- March 15 – Russ Goetz, 86, umpire who worked in the American League from 1968 to 1983, while umpiring 2,384 regular season games as well as two World Series, two All-Star Games, and four American League Championship Series.
- March 19 – Audrey Kissel, 91, All-American Girls Professional Baseball League player.
- March 21 – Jerry Krause, 77, scout who worked for the New York Yankees, New York Mets, Chicago White Sox and Arizona Diamondbacks organizations; best known as an NBA general manager and architect of Chicago Bulls' 1990s dynasty.
- March 21 – José Zardón, 93, Cuban outfielder and last survivor of the Washington Senators Major League Baseball club, who was also a member of the 1946 Havana Kings in the minor leagues.
- March 22 – Dallas Green, 82, pitcher, manager and executive; went 20–22 (4.26) in 185 games for Philadelphia Phillies, Washington Senators and New York Mets (1960–1967); returned to Phillies as a minor-league manager and farm system boss until he succeeded Danny Ozark as the club's manager on August 31, 1979; the next season, he became a Philadelphia legend after guiding the Phillies to the franchise's first World Series championship in 1980; became president/general manager of Chicago Cubs in 1982 and on his watch Cubs won the 1984 National League East title for their first postseason appearance since 1945; left Cubs after 1987 season, but returned to uniform to manage the New York Yankees from Opening Day to August 17, 1989, and New York Mets from May 21, 1993, to August 25, 1996.
- March 22 – Mark Higgins, 53, first baseman who played briefly for the Cleveland Indians in its 1989 season.
- March 25 – Jack Faszholz, 89, pitcher who played briefly for the St. Louis Cardinals in its 1953 season.
- March 25 – Alice Hohlmayer, 92, All-American Girls Professional Baseball League player.
- March 26 – Todd Frohwirth, 54, submarine-ball reliever who split nine seasons between the Philadelphia Phillies, Baltimore Orioles, Boston Red Sox, and California Angels from 1987 through 1996.
- March 30 – Hattie Peterson, 86, pitcher who played from 1948 to 1949 for the Rockford Peaches of the All-American Girls Professional Baseball League.
- March 31 – Rubén Amaro Sr., 81, native of Mexico who spent more than six decades in the game as a player, manager, coach, scout, instructor and executive, including 11 seasons as a shortstop for four Major League Baseball clubs, most prominently with the Philadelphia Phillies from 1960 through 1965, winning a Gold Glove in 1964; his son has been an MLB player, coach and executive.

=== April ===
- April 3 – Roy Sievers, 90, first AL Rookie of the Year Award winner while playing for the 1949 St. Louis Browns, and one of the leading sluggers of the 1950s with the original AL Washington Senators.
- April 6 – Bob Cerv, 91, member of the 1956 New York Yankees World Series Champions, as well as the 1958 All-Star Game starting outfielder as a Kansas City Athletics member.
- April 11 – Luis Romero Petit, 100, Venezuela national team third baseman for three Baseball World Cup champions, who at the time of his death was recognized as the oldest living former player of the historic 1941 team.
- April 13 – Vic Barnhart, 94, shortstop for the Pittsburgh Pirates in part of three seasons spanning 1944–1946.
- April 18 – Vic Albury, 69, pitcher for the Minnesota Twins from 1973 through 1976.
- April 23 – Jaynne Bittner, 91, pitcher who played from 1948 through 1954 for four different teams of the All-American Girls Professional Baseball League.
- April 28 – Luis Olmo, 97, Puerto Rican outfielder for the Brooklyn Dodgers and Boston Braves in a span of seven seasons from 1943 to 1951, who led the National League in triples in 1945, while in the same season became just the second player in Major League history to hit a bases-loaded triple and a grand slam in the same game, matching the feat set by Del Bissonette in 1930.

=== May ===
- May 1 – Sam Mele, 95, outfielder who played a decade in the majors for six clubs and later managed the Minnesota Twins, leading them to their first American League pennant in 1965, being named MLB Manager of the Year in that season.
- May 4 – Glenna Sue Kidd, 83, All-American Girls Professional Baseball League pitcher for four teams from 1949 to 1954, who was a member of two South Bend Blue Sox championship teams and also pitched two complete games of a doubleheader in 1953 and won both.
- May 14 – Steve Palermo, 67, colorful and well respected umpire who worked in the American League from 1977 to 1991, while appearing in the 1983 World Series, the 1986 All-Star Game, three AL Championship Series and one AL Division Series, whose career ended when he was shot in the back while attempting to break up a robbery outside a Dallas restaurant, even though he regained the ability to walk and served MLB as a special assistant and umpire supervisor until the day of his death.
- May 15 – Bob Kuzava, 93, pitcher for eight different teams over 10 seasons spanning 1946–1957, who helped the New York Yankees win three consecutive world championship titles from 1951 through 1953, earning two saves in the 1951 WS and the 1952 WS, while winning the decisive game in the 1953 WS.
- May 19 – Dave McDonald, 73, first baseman for the 1969 New York Yankees and the 1971 Montreal Expos.
- May 19 – Ed Mierkowicz, 93, outfielder who played for the Detroit Tigers and St. Louis Cardinals in a span of four seasons from 1945 to 1950, as well as the last living member of the Detroit Tigers' 1945 World Series championship team.
- May 19 – Steve Waterbury, 65, relief pitcher for the 1976 St. Louis Cardinals.
- May 23 – Patricia Roy, 78, All-American Girls Professional Baseball League infielder for the 1954 Fort Wayne Daisies.
- May 26 – Jim Bunning, 85, Hall of Fame pitcher and a nine-time All-Star, who hurled a perfect game and a no-hitter; posting a 224–184 record with a 3.27 ERA and 2,855 strikeouts over a 17-year career from 1955 to 1971, while pitching for the Detroit Tigers, Philadelphia Phillies, Pittsburgh Pirates and Los Angeles Dodgers, and also joining Cy Young as the only pitchers with 100 wins, 1,000 strikeouts and a no-hitter in both the American and National Leagues, to become later the only Baseball Hall of Fame member to serve in the U.S. Congress.

=== June ===
- June 2 – Herm Starrette, 80, relief pitcher for the Baltimore Orioles from 1963 through 1965, who later became a pitching coach, including stints with the 1974 Atlanta Braves and specially for the World Champion Philadelphia Phillies in 1980, while serving in a variety of positions with seven major league teams in a span of 28 years, ending up with the Boston Red Sox in 2002.
- June 3 – Jimmy Piersall, 87, a two-time All-Star center fielder and twice Gold Glove winner, who spent 17 seasons in the majors with four teams from 1950 to 1967, most prominently for the Boston Red Sox, and also wrote his autobiography, Fear Strikes Out, central theme of the film of the same title starred by Anthony Perkins.
- June 5 – Héctor Wagner, 48, Dominican Republic pitcher who played from 1990 to 1991 for the Kansas City Royals.
- June 12 – Bob Zick, 90, pitcher for the 1954 Chicago Cubs.
- June 27 – Lillian Shadic, 88, outfielder for the Springfield Sallies of the All-American Girls Professional Baseball League in 1949.
- June 27 – Anthony Young, 51, former pitcher for the New York Mets, Chicago Cubs and Houston Astros, who still holds the major league record with 27 consecutive losses, set with the Mets between 1992 and 1993.

=== July ===
- July 2 – David Vincent, 67, Major League Baseball official scorer, statistician, and historian.
- July 3 – Bob Perry, 82, backup outfielder for the Los Angeles Angels in a span of two seasons from 1963 to 1964.
- July 4 – Gene Conley, 86, three-time All-Star pitcher and the first Minor League player to earn two MVP Awards honors, who also is the only athlete to own dual-sport championships in MLB and the NBA, while pitching for the World Series champion Milwaukee Braves in 1957, and as a forward for the Boston Celtics in three championships from 1959 to 1961.
- July 6 – Dom Zanni, 85, pitcher for the San Francisco Giants, Chicago White Sox and Cincinnati Reds in parts of seven seasons from 1958 to 1966.
- July 15 – Bob Wolff, 96, sportscaster and the only one to call play-by-play of championships in all four major North American professional team sports, who also interviewed Babe Ruth, called the only perfect game in World Series history, and was the voice of the Washington Senators from 1947 to 1960.
- July 18 – John Rheinecker, 38, pitcher for the Texas Rangers in parts of two seasons from 2006 to 2007.
- July 29 – Lee May, 74, three-time All-Star first baseman and member of three different Halls of Fame, who played for four teams over 18 seasons while making two World Series appearances with the Cincinnati Reds in 1970 and the Baltimore Orioles in 1979.

=== August ===
- August 6 – Darren Daulton, 55, Philadelphia Phillies All-Star catcher and leader of the 1993 Phillies team that clinched the National League pennant and lost to the Toronto Blue Jays in six games in the 1993 World Series.
- August 7 – Don Baylor, 68, All-Star and the 1979 American League MVP winner with the California Angels while leading the major leagues in RBI and runs, who also reached the World Series three straight times from 1986 through 1988, winning the title with the Minnesota Twins in the 1987 Series, and also later managed the Colorado Rockies and Chicago Cubs, leading the Rockies to their first ever postseason berth in 1995 and earning National League Manager of the Year honors that season.
- August 8 – Ken Kaiser, 72, pro-wrestler-turned-umpire who worked in the American League from 1977 to 1999, while umpiring in two World Series, the 1991 All-Star Game, four AL Championship Series and three AL Division Series.
- August 9 – Danny Walton, 70, outfielder who spent parts of nine seasons with eight different clubs, including stints for the Milwaukee Brewers from 1970 to 1971 and the Minnesota Twins in 1973 and 1975.
- August 10 – Don Gross, 86, pitcher who played from 1955 to 1960 with the Cincinnati Redlegs and Pittsburgh Pirates.
- August 12 – Paul Casanova, 75, Cuban catcher and American League All-Star who played for the Washington Senators and Atlanta Braves in a span of 10 seasons from 1965 to 1974.
- August 21 – Felo Ramírez, 94, Hall of Fame Spanish-language radio voice of the Miami Marlins for over three decades.
- August 23 – Joe Klein, 75, former general manager for the Texas Rangers, Cleveland Indians and Detroit Tigers before serving as executive director of the independent Atlantic League since its inception in 1997.

=== September ===
- September 1 – Paul Schaal, 74, third baseman who played for the Kansas City Royals from their inaugural season in 1969 to 1974.
- September 1 – Stan Swanson, 73, outfielder for the 1971 Montreal Expos.
- September 5 – Tom Wright, 93, corner outfielder for four American League clubs in part of nine seasons spanning 1948–1956, most prominently with the Boston Red Sox from 1948 to 1951.
- September 7 – Gene Michael, 79, former Major League player, manager, scout and executive, who as general manager for the New York Yankees was responsible for building their dominant teams that would help yield four World Series championships in five years from 1996 to 2000.
- September 9 – Jim Donohue, 79, relief pitcher for the Detroit Tigers, Los Angeles Angels and Minnesota Twins in a span of two seasons from 1961 to 1962.
- September 11 – Mel Didier, 90, longtime Major League Baseball executive in different areas of the game, who is best known for his scouting report on Dennis Eckersley which Kirk Gibson credited for his dramatic 1988 World Series Game One-winning pinch-hit home run.
- September 17 – Dave Hilton, 67, infielder and first overall pick of the 1971 MLB draft by the San Diego Padres, who played for them from 1972 through 1975 and later spent three seasons in Nippon Professional Baseball.
- September 20 – Mickey Harrington, 82, who was used by the 1963 Philadelphia Phillies in only one game as a pinch-runner for Roy Sievers.
- September 20 – Garry Hill, 70, pitcher for the Atlanta Braves during the 1969 season.
- September 20 – Ed Phillips, 73, relief pitcher in 18 games for the 1970 Boston Red Sox.

=== October ===
- October 2 – Solly Hemus, 94, shortstop/second baseman and manager in an 11-season career with the St. Louis Cardinals and Philadelphia Phillies from 1949 to 1959, the last living major league manager in the 1950s as well as the last Cardinals player-manager in 1959.
- October 3 – John Herrnstein, 79, first baseman and left fielder who played for the Philadelphia Phillies, Atlanta Braves and Chicago Cubs in part of five seasons spanning 1962–1966.
- October 7 – Jim Landis, 83, two-time All-Star center fielder and five-time Gold Glove Award winner, who played for six teams in an eleven-season career spanning 1957–1967, most prominently with the Chicago White Sox from 1957 to 1964.
- October 8 – Don Lock, 81, center fielder who spent eight seasons from 1962 to 1969 with the Washington Senators, Philadelphia Phillies and Boston Red Sox.
- October 9 – Roy Hawes, 91, first baseman for the 1951 Washington Senators.
- October 9 – Mike McQueen, 67, pitcher who played for the Atlanta Braves and Cincinnati Reds in a span of five seasons between 1969 and 1974.
- October 11 – Chikara Hashimoto, 83, Japanese baseball player in the NPB who later became a film actor.
- October 11 – Betty Moczynski, 91, All-American Girls Professional League outfielder, one of the original members of the league in 1943 with the Rockford Peaches.
- October 14 – Daniel Webb, 28, relief pitcher who appeared in parts of four seasons from 2013 to 2016, all with the Chicago White Sox.
- October 17 – Ed Barnowski, 74, pitcher who played from 1965 to 1966 for the Baltimore Orioles.
- October 21 – Chuck Churn, 87, relief pitcher who played from 1957 through 1959 for the Pittsburgh Pirates, Cleveland Indians and Los Angeles Dodgers.
- October 22 – Darrell Osteen, 74, relief pitcher who played for the Cincinnati Reds and Oakland Athletics in parts of four seasons from 1965 to 1970.
- October 25 – Ross Powell, 49, relief pitcher for the Cincinnati Reds, Houston Astros and Pittsburgh Pirates in part of three seasons from 1993 to 1995.
- October 29 – Al Richter, 90, shortstop who played for the Boston Red Sox in a span of two seasons from 1951 to 1953.
- October 30 – Bob Talbot, 89, speedy outfielder who played from 1953 to 1954 for the Chicago Cubs.

=== November ===
- November 4 – Gene Verble, 89, middle infielder who played a full season for the 1951 Washington Senators and part of the 1953 season for the same team.
- November 6 – Rick Stelmaszek, 69, backup catcher for the Washington Senators, Texas Rangers, California Angels and Chicago Cubs in a span of three seasons from 1971 to 1974, who also served as the Minnesota Twins bullpen coach from 1981 to 2012.
- November 7 – Roy Halladay, 40, eight-time All-Star and two-time Cy Young Award-winning pitcher for the Toronto Blue Jays and Philadelphia Phillies, who posted a 203–105 record with a 3.38 ERA from 1998 to 2013, while pitching the 20th perfect game in MLB history in 2010 as well as a no-hitter in the 2010 NLDS playoffs.
- November 8 – Don Prince, 79, relief pitcher who played briefly for the Chicago Cubs in the 1962 season.
- November 11 – Rance Pless, 91, corner infielder in 48 games for the 1956 Kansas City Athletics.
- November 13 – Bobby Doerr, 99, Hall of Fame and nine-time All-Star second baseman; the oldest living major league player prior at the time of his death, who played each of his 14 seasons with the Boston Red Sox between 1937 and 1951 before retiring at age 33 due to a back injury, serving later as a scout for the Red Sox from 1957 to 1966, as well as its first base coach and hitting instructor from 1967 to 1969.
- November 13 – Jim Rivera, 96, outfielder on the 1959 Chicago White Sox' team that lost to the Los Angeles Dodgers in the World Series, who played for the Sox from 1952 to 1961, as a key member of the Let's Go, Go-Go White Sox teams.
- November 16 – Tommy Moore, 69, pitcher for the New York Mets, St. Louis Cardinals, Texas Rangers and Seattle Mariners in part of four seasons spanning 1972–1977.
- November 18 – Bob Borkowski, 91, pitcher turned outfielder who spent most of his six Major League with the Chicago Cubs and Cincinnati Reds, and also was a member of the 1955 World Series Champion Brooklyn Dodgers.
- November 23 – Miguel Alfredo González, 34, Cuban pitcher who played briefly for the Philadelphia Phillies in their 2014 season.
- November 30 – Dick Gernert, 89, first baseman and outfielder for the Boston Red Sox from 1952 through 1959, who later played three more major league seasons with the Chicago Cubs, Detroit Tigers, Cincinnati Reds and Houston Colt .45s.

=== December ===
- December 1 – Ernie Fazio, 75, second baseman who played for the Houston Colt .45s and Kansas City Athletics in part of three seasons spanning 1962–1966.
- December 6 – Tracy Stallard, 80, pitcher for the Boston Red Sox, New York Mets and St. Louis Cardinals in a span of seven seasons from 1960 through 1966, who became a part of Major League Baseball history in 1961 when he allowed Roger Maris to hit his record-setting 61st home run in a season.
- December 11 – Manny Jiménez, 79, Dominican Republic outfielder who played for the Kansas City Athletics, Pittsburgh Pirates, and Chicago Cubs in all or part of eight seasons between 1962 and 1969.
- December 12 – Ken Bracey, 80, minor league pitcher from 1956 to 1964 who later was a longtime scout for the San Diego Padres.
- December 13 – Frank Lary, 87, Two-time All-Star and Gold Glove winning pitcher as well as a two-time 20-game winner, who was victorious 123 times for the Detroit Tigers over 11 seasons from 1954 to 1965, with 27 of his career wins coming against the New York Yankees, which earned him the nickname of the Yankee Killer.
- December 17 – Doug Gallagher, 77, pitcher who played briefly for the Detroit Tigers in their 1962 season.
- December 19 – Mamie 'Peanut' Johnson, 82, female pitcher and one of just three women to play in the Negro leagues.
- December 21 – Dick Enberg, 82, member of the Baseball Hall of Fame as well as the only person to win three Emmy Awards as a sports broadcaster, writer and producer, also earning inductions to multiple Hall of Fames and a star on the Hollywood Walk of Fame, after calling 42 NFL seasons, 28 Wimbledon tennis tournaments, 15 NCAA basketball title games, 10 Super Bowls, nine Rose Bowls and the 1982 World Series, concluding a career that spanned six decades including play-by-play stints with the California Angels from 1969 to 1978 and the San Diego Padres from 2010 to 2016.
- December 23 – Angelo Dagres, 83, outfielder who played briefly for the Baltimore Orioles in their 1955 season.
- December 24 – Jerry Kindall, 82, who played second base from 1956 through 1965 for the Chicago Cubs, Cleveland Indians and Minnesota Twins, and later was a three-time College World Series-winning coach at the University of Arizona.
- December 28 – Al Luplow, 78, outfielder who played for the Cleveland Indians, New York Mets, and Pittsburgh Pirates over seven seasons from 1961 to 1967.
