= Horizon Air Summer Series =

- Horizon Air Summer Series
- Sport: Baseball
- Founded: 2005
- Folded: 2013
- No. of teams: 15
- Country: United States
- Last champion: Seattle Studs
- Website: Official Website

The Horizon Air Summer Series was a unique 11-week baseball competition among collegiate summer baseball clubs.

== History ==
The Summer Series was founded in 2005 by Bob Bavasi, former owner of the Everett Aqua Sox, of the Northwest League. It is sponsored by Alaska Airlines' sister company, Horizon Air. It is hosted by the Marysville Gold Sox of Marysville, California.

Among other leagues, teams from the Alaska Baseball League, West Coast League, Pacific International League, Southern California Collegiate Baseball Association, Sierra Baseball League, and California Collegiate League have competed in the series.

The series was originally made up of two divisions: The 40-game "McCullough Division" and the 20-game "Engelken Division". In 2008 the series was expanded with the addition of a third division, the "Bavasi Division", named after the series founder's father and former Brooklyn Dodger and Los Angeles Dodger General Manager Emil "Buzzie" Bavasi.

The Horizon Air Summer Series ceased after the 2013 season. It has since been replaced by the Sierra Central/Montna Farms Summer Series (now known as just the Montna Farms Summer Series, again hosted by the Gold Sox.

== Divisions & teams ==
The series teams are divided up into three divisions.

Don McCullough Division (40 games)

- Atwater Aviators
- Humboldt Crabs
- Marysville Gold Sox
- Neptune Beach Pearl
- Redding Colt 45s
- Seattle Studs

Gary Engelken Division (24 games)

- California Glory
- Menlo Park Legends
- Nevada Bighorns
- San Francisco Seagulls
- South Bay Storm
- Walnut Creek Crawdads

Buzzie Bavasi Division (24 games)

- Auburn Wildcats
- Sacramento Legends
- Sacramento Spikes
- San Mateo Rounders
- Solano Mudcats

== Champions ==
- 2005: Solano Thunderbirds
- 2006: Yuba-Sutter Gold Sox
- 2007: Humboldt Crabs & Corvallis Knights (tied)
- 2008: Seattle Studs
- 2009: Seattle Studs
- 2010: Seattle Studs
- 2011: Marysville Gold Sox
- 2012: Seattle Studs
- 2013: Humboldt Crabs

== Notable alumni ==
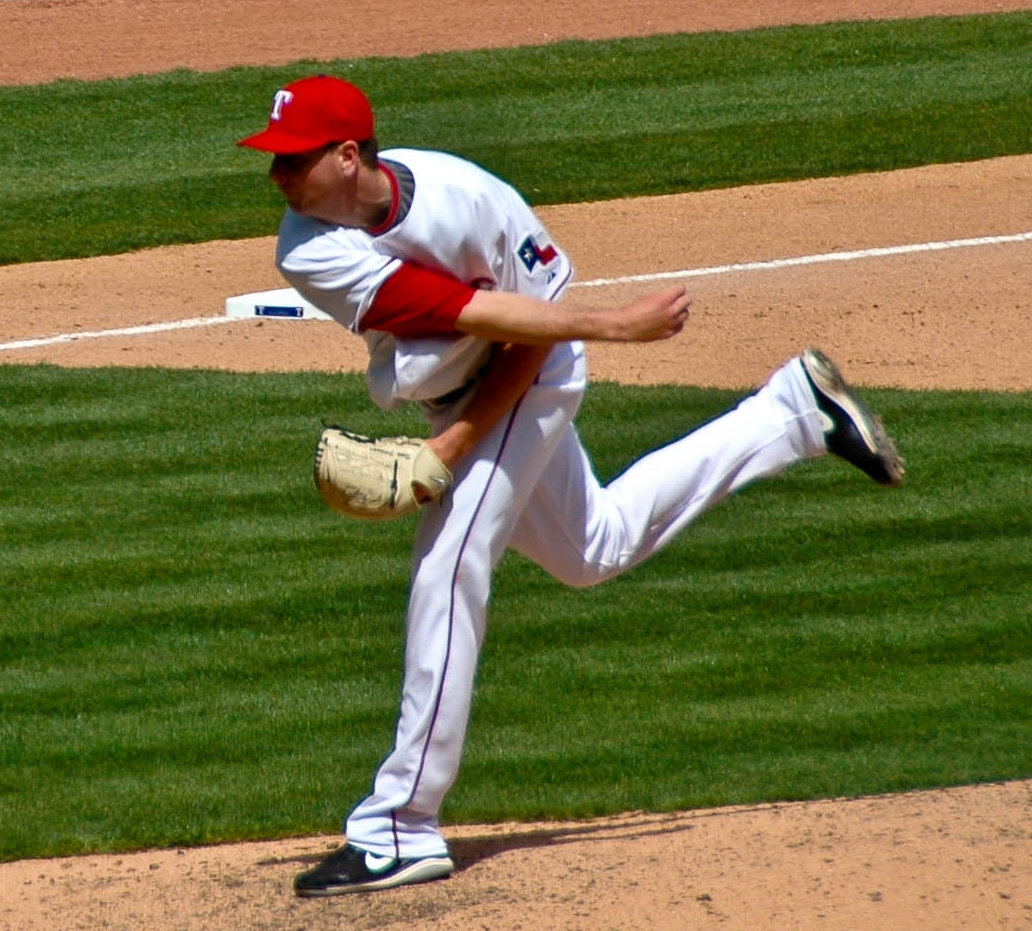
Scott Feldman

- Anthony Bass
- Dallas Braden
- Matt Garza
- Bud Norris
- Scott Feldman
- Toby Gerhart
- Tommy Everidge
- Tommy Hanson
- Kevin Frandsen
- Curtis Partch
- Max Stassi
