= Ryuichiro Akada =

Japanese baseball player (born 1988)

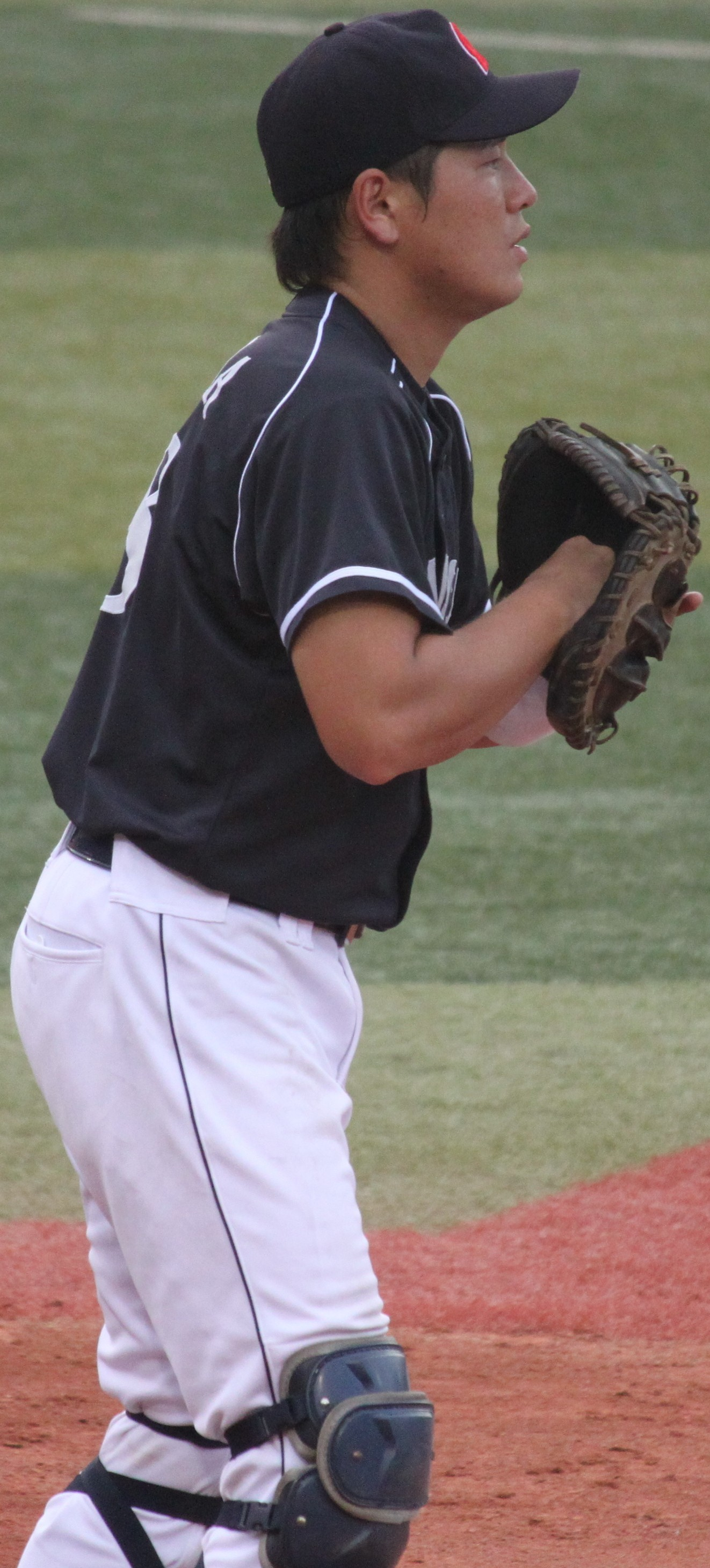

Chunichi Dragons – No. 104
- Bullpen Catcher
- Born: January 7, 1988 (age 38); Nagoya, Aichi, Japan
- Bats: Left Throws: Right

debut
- August 1, 2013, for the Chunichi Dragons

Teams
- Chunichi Dragons (2010–2017)

Ryuichiro Akada (赤田 龍一郎, Akada Ryūichirō; born January 7, 1988 in Nagoya, Aichi, Japan) is a former professional Japanese baseball player. He is employed as a bullpen catcher for the Chunichi Dragons.

His eyes are of a blue tinge due to American heritage through his grandfather.
