= Seattle Studs =

Seattle Cheney Studs

Information
- Location: Tacoma, Washington
- Ballpark: University of Puget Sound
- Founded: 1954
- NBC World Series championships: 2013, 2015, 2019
- Former name: Tacoma Cheney Studs
- Former league: Pacific International League
- General manager: Barry Aden
- Manager: Barry Aden
- Website: Official Website

The Seattle Cheney Studs are a semi-professional/collegiate baseball team in the greater Seattle, Washington, area. They are currently a member of the National Baseball Congress in the Pacific International League and compete in the Horizon Air Summer Series. The team's motto is "Once a Stud, Always a Stud". The team is coached by Barry Aden, Tegan Aden, Chris Remington and Cody Aden. They are advised by Elisa Thomases.

== Franchise history ==
The Seattle Cheney Studs are one of the oldest amateur baseball organizations in the country. The Studs were founded 70 years ago in 1954 by Ben Cheney of Cheney Lumber Company in Tacoma, Washington, as the Cheney Studs. The “Studs” nickname is derived from Cheney's company that copyrighted the 2 x 4 for building homes and structures. The team has been active for 70 consecutive years, most under the banner of the Seattle Cheney Studs, but also the Cheney Studs, Performance Radiator Studs, and Swannie's Studs. The Studs have traditionally consisted of a combination of current and former college players, and former professionals. In the last few seasons, the team has begun to consist of a greater percentage of college players than former professionals.

The Studs earned their first trip to the National Baseball Congress World Series in 1989 (0-2), with subsequent appearances in 1992 (T-5th), 1993 (T-11th), and 1994 (T-11th). They have attended the NBC every year since 2002, finishing in the top ten thirteen times, and finishing first runner up in 2008, 2010, 2012 and 2014. They won the NBC World Series for the first time in 2013 a second time in 2015 and a third title in 2019. They won the Horizon Air Summer Series in 2008, 2009, 2010 and 2012. The Studs also compete in the Grand Forks International every year, winning the tournament in 2001, 2010, 2015, 2016 and 2017. The Studs play annually in Kamloops, British Columbia in the Kamloops International Baseball Tournament, winning the tournament 10 out of the last 14 years. The Kamloops tournament was not played in 2013.

== Home field ==
In 2002, the Seattle Studs began using the University of Puget Sound in Tacoma, WA, as their home ballpark during the summers. In the summer of 2008, the Studs began to split their home games between the University of Puget Sound and Steve Cox Memorial Stadium in the White Center area of Seattle, Washington. In summer 2011, the University of Puget Sound's baseball field was renovated, and the Studs played their home games at the Heidelberg Field Complex in Tacoma. In summer 2011, the team also played 12 games at Maguinez Field, named after Bob Maguinez, a former Cheney Studs player from the 1950s.

== Rivals ==
The Seattle Studs' main rival in the Pacific Northwest is the Everett Merchants semi-professional baseball team. These two franchises have competed for over 24 years in the Pacific International League and many of the major tournaments in the Northwest. The Studs have dominated this rivalry over the past ten years, perpetually winning the Pacific International League. The Studs often recruit the Merchants' best players for the National Baseball Congress World Series in August. The Studs also defeated the Merchants in the final of the 2015 Grand Forks International, winning the tournament.

The Studs also started an annual rivalry with the Humboldt Crabs, a semi-professional team located in Arcata, California, playing the Crabs on their annual California road trip.

== Coaches ==
Barry Aden, a member of the National Baseball Congress Hall of Fame, the Grand Forks Tournament Hall of Fame, the National Semi Pro Baseball Hall of Fame, Tacoma Oldtimers Hall of Fame and the Centralia College Sports Hall of Fame, is the General Manager and Head Coach of the Seattle Cheney Studs. In over 34 years of coaching, Aden has compiled a record of 1177 wins, 482 losses and 6 ties. He has led the Studs to the NBC World Series 25 times, and to a top 10 finish 15 times, finishing first runner up in 2008, 2010, 2012 and 2014. He also led the Studs to their first ever NBC World Series National Championship in 2013, their second national championship in 2015 and their 3rd National title in 2019. Aden was awarded manager of the year for the team's first-place finish in 2013 and again in 2019.

=== Former coaches ===
- Mark Dow 1998–2000
- Dan Dow 1995–1997
- Jeff Scanlan 1994
- Barry Aden 1990–1993
- Steve Quealey 1990
- Dave "Scooter" Ellis 1990
- Ken Knutson 1988–1989
- Dave Pascho 1986–1987
- Jim Riley 1985
- Greg McCollum 1981–1984
- Larry Book 1980
- Fred Shull 1976–1979
- Tom Kallas 1975
- Paul Tomlinson 1973–1974
- George Grant 1966–1972
- Ed O'Brien 1961-1965
- Doug McArthur 1957
- Joe Budnick 1954–1960

== Notable alumni ==
- Tim Lincecum
- Brent Lillibridge

NBC All-Americans

- Isaiah Afework, outfielder (2024)
- Jonas Kim, designated hitter (2021)
- Charlie Larson, third baseman (2021)
- Henry Cheney, outfielder (MVP 2019)
- Kyle Strash, infielder (2019)
- Zander Clouse, pitcher (2019)
- Jack Pauley, designated hitter (2019)
- Brock Gagliardi, catcher (2019)
- Garrett Breda, catcher (2018, 2012)
- Landon Riker, outfielder (2017)
- Connor Savage, outfielder (2015, MVP 2015)
- Geoff Brown, pitcher (2015)
- Scott Kuzminsky, pitcher (2014, 2011)
- Taylor Thompson, pitcher (2014, 2013, 2010, 2008) *Inducted into the NBC Hall of Fame (2016)
- Eric Peterson, designated hitter (2013)
- David Benson, pitcher (2012, MVP 2013)
- Bobby Tannehill, utility (2012)
- Brady Steiger, designated hitter (2012)
- Derek Jennings, shortstop (2010, 2008)
- Brandon Kuykendall, outfielder (2008)
- Nick Cebula, pitcher (2007, 2005)
- Andre Marshall, outfielder (2006)
- Dan Dimascio, utility (1992)
- Rich Mialovich, third baseman (1992)

== In popular culture ==
A Seattle Studs Baseball t-shirt can be seen in a location in The X-Files Game from 1998, which was filmed and set in Seattle.
