= World Baseball Challenge =

International baseball competition

- Sport: Baseball
- Founded: 2009
- Country: Canada
- Venues: Citizen Field, Prince George, British Columbia
- Continent: North America
- Most recent champion: Team Japan (2016)
- Most titles: Four teams (1 each)

The World Baseball Challenge is an international baseball competition based in Prince George, British Columbia, Canada. The tournament was established in 2002 by Larry Seminoff, who is also the founder of the Grand Forks International.

== History ==
The current incarnation of the event, beginning in 2009, has been held every two years at Citizen Field in Prince George, British Columbia, Canada. It is sanctioned by the International Baseball Federation, Baseball Canada and Baseball BC. The field of participants for the event typically consists of amateur or competitors such as the United States Collegiate National Team, the Cuban National baseball B squad, independent Canadian club teams and Japanese industrial clubs.

=== 2009 ===
The USA National Collegiate Baseball Team defeated the German National Team by a score of 8–1 in the final. Drew Pomeranz of the University of Mississippi pitched a one-hitter against the tournament's only European team. German starting pitcher Tim Henkenjohann was named the Most Valuable Player of the tournament. Team USA included several future Major League Baseball players, such as Trevor Bauer, Gerrit Cole, Yasmani Grandal, Sonny Gray, Kolten Wong and Pomeranz. Canada, British Columbia, Prince George Axemen and the Bahamas National Team finished in third through sixth place respectively.

=== 2011 ===
Cuban National Baseball B Team defeated Chinese Taipei 10–5 in the final. The Cuban squad included future American League Rookie of the Year José Abreu.

=== 2013 ===
The Ciego de Ávila Tigres of the Cuban National Series defeated Japan's JX-ENEOS 14–4 by mercy rule in the championship game. Team USA, with a roster featuring players from the Northwest Collegiate Baseball League, finished third in its return to the tournament.

=== 2016 ===
In 2015, the event's organizers announced that that year's tournament would be postponed until 2016 due to a lack of sponsor support. Canada was to be represented by the Langley Blaze U18, facing the winners of Japan's InterCity baseball tournament and players from the Northwest Collegiate Baseball League (Team USA). Teams from the Bahamas and Cuba were also expected to play in the tournament.

The 2016 tournament is August 12–20, 2016. Roswell Invaders of the Pecos League are one of two teams from the United States. Other teams participating are Kamloops Sun Devils, Sidearm Nation (Calgary), Team Japan and the Thurston County Senators (Olympia) of the Puget Sound Collegiate League.

Team Japan went undefeated to capture the gold medal. They defeated Roswell Invaders 5–4 in the finale, scoring the winning run on a passed ball.

== Tournament results ==
Year	Gold medal	Silver medal	Bronze medal	Other participants
2009	USA Baseball Collegiate National Team	Team Germany	Team Canada	Team British Columbia, Prince George Axemen, Bahamas National Baseball Team
2011	Cuba National Baseball Team "B"	Team Chinese Taipei	Toshiba (Japan)	Team Canada, Bahamas National Baseball Team, Beijing Tigers
2013	Ciego de Ávila Tigres	JX-ENEOS (Japan)	Team USA	Team Chinese Taipei, Team Canada
2016	Team Japan	Roswell Invaders	Sidearm Nation	Thurston County Senators, Kamloops Sun Devils

== See also ==
- Baseball awards § World
- Grand Forks International
