= Grand Forks International =

Annual baseball tournament held in British Columbia

- Sport: Baseball
- Founded: 1975
- Motto: Come see tomorrow's stars, today!
- No. of teams: 12
- Country: Canada
- Venues: James Donaldson Park, Grand Forks, British Columbia
- Continent: North America
- Most recent champion: Seattle Studs (7th title)
- Most titles: Lewiston Truckers (9 titles)

The Grand Forks International (GFI) is an annual international invitational baseball tournament hosted at James Donaldson Park in Grand Forks, British Columbia. The GFI is the largest invitational baseball tournament in Canada and is a large part of the culture in Grand Forks. The tournament is also notable for being run entirely by volunteers.

== History ==
The Grand Forks International was founded by Larry Seminoff, and the tournament led to the existence of the World Baseball Challenge, initially starting in 2002, at James Donaldson Park. The 2015 prize purse is $54,000.

=== Past winners ===
Prior winners of the tournament are:

Year	Iteration	Champions
1975	1st	(United States) Seattle Stoen
1976	2nd	(Canada) Vancouver T.O.S.
1977	3rd	(United States) Seattle N.W. Screw Products
1978	4th	(United States) Lewiston Truckers
1979	5th	(United States) Seattle N.W. Screw Products
1980	6th	(United States) Seattle Angels
1981	7th	(United States) Lewiston Truckers
1982	8th	(United States) Springfield Abbey's
1983	9th	(United States) Grants Pass Thunderbirds
1984	10th	(United States) Lewiston Truckers
1985	11th	(United States) Spokane Bulldogs
1986	12th	(United States) Seattle Swannies
1987	13th	(United States) Lewiston Truckers
1988	14th	Team Japan
1989	15th	(United States) Washington State Cougars
1990	16th	(United States) Tahoe Stars
1991	17th	(United States) L.A. Rangers
1993	18th	Team Japan
1994	19th	Team Japan
1995	20th	(United States) Lewiston Truckers
1997	21st	Team Japan
1999	22nd	(United States) Houston Astros
2001	23rd	(United States) Seattle Studs
2002	-	No tournament due to World Baseball Challenge
2003	24th	(United States) Houston Astros
2004	25th	(United States) San Diego Stars
2005	26th	(United States) New York Storm
2006	27th	(United States) San Diego Stars
2008	28th	(United States) Lewiston Truckers
2009	29th	(United States) Lewiston Truckers
2010	30th	(United States) Seattle Studs
2011	31st	(United States) Lewiston Truckers
2012	32nd	(United States) Lewiston Truckers
2013	-	Cancelled
2014	33rd	(Canada) Burnaby Bulldogs
2015	34th	(United States) Seattle Studs
2016	35th	(United States) Seattle Studs
2017	36th	(United States) Seattle Studs
2018	-	Cancelled
2019	37th	(United States) Alaska Goldpanners
2020	-	Cancelled
2021	-	Cancelled
2022	38th	(United States) Seattle Studs
2023	39th	(United States) Everett Merchants
2024	40th	(United States) Seattle Blackfins
2025	41st	(United States) Alaska Goldpanners
2026	42nd	(United States) Seattle Studs

=== Alumni ===
Notable Grand Forks International Alumni

Player	Year	Team
Jason Bay	2004	Trail Orioles
Jeff Francis	1999	Team Canada
John Olerud	1987-1988	Washington State Cougars
Josh Beckett	1997	Houston Astros
Larry Walker	1984	-
Tim Lincecum	2004	Seattle Studs
Sean Halton	2008	Lewiston Truckers
Aaron Sele	1988-1990	Washington State Cougars
Keith Foulke	1993	Lewiston Truckers
Marcus Giles	-	San Diego Stars

== Rules ==
Rule 1: The official rules of baseball, as published by Baseball Canada, shall govern the playing of baseball games during the tournament. Specifications as to facility, equipment, play-off format, etc. have been modified to meet the needs of the tournament. Teams may elect to use the designated hitter rule.

Rule 2: All games will be nine (9) innings. Extra innings to be played to determine winners.

Rule 3: Toss of a coin at home plate will determine home team for all preliminary round games. Teams with better records, as determined by the tournament rules, will be the Home Teams for all Money Round games.

Rule 4: Teams must be prepared to play ball when scheduled. Infield drills will be permitted only if time allows.

Rule 5: The 20 second rule between pitches will be invoked. If the pitcher has not delivered the ball to the batter within 20 seconds after receiving the ball an automatic ball will be issued to the batter. If the batter is not set in the batter’s box within the 20 seconds and the pitcher is ready to throw an automatic strike will be issued.

Rule 6: After the third out of each at bat the teams have 90 seconds to resume play.

Rule 7: An Eight Run rule will apply to all tournament games except the semi-finals and final. If one team is ahead by eight or more runs after the trailing team has completed seven innings the game is over.

Rule 8: Should circumstances arise where a game or games are postponed or cancelled, the Tournament Rules Committee (TRC) has the authority to act upon any alteration to the tournament format or schedule.

Rule 9: There are no restrictions relative to roster size. However, teams will not be permitted to add to their roster any player who was on the roster of a team eliminated earlier from further competition.

Rule 10: Should a protest arise, that protest must officially be brought to the attention of the home plate umpire, who in turn will forward such protest to the Tournament Protest Committee Chairman or designate. This Committee will then rule on the identified protest and their decision will be final.

Rule 11: In the event a contest is forfeited, the team receiving the forfeiture shall claim a 7-0 win. The forfeiting team, meanwhile, shall surrender all earnings, if any, to the tournament.

Rule 12: The top two teams in each division will qualify for the tournament’s Money Round.

Rule 13: Two wild card teams with the best record after the top two division teams are determined will complete the eight team Money Round.

Rule 14: Tie Breaker Rule: the following Rule will determine division winners, division runner-up teams, wild card teams, and Money Round seeding.

Tie Breaker Rule:

1. Runs allowed / innings played defensively.
2. Earned Run average.
3. Runs for / innings played offensively

Rule 15: A playoff game of 5 innings will be held to determine the second wild card team in the event of all 3 divisions having 3 teams with identical 2 - 1 round robin records.

Rule 16: This is a wood bat tournament. Composite bats are allowed.

Rule 17: Any player who is ejected from the game is subject to further discipline at the discretion of the Tournament Committee.

== See also ==
- Baseball awards § World
