= Jayhawk Collegiate League =

Summer baseball league in Kansas, US

- Sport: Baseball
- Founded: 1976
- President: J. D. Schneider, Pat Hon, Commissioner
- No. of teams: 8 (as of May 26th, 2025)
- Countries: United States
- Headquarters: Wichita, Kansas
- Continent: North America
- Most recent champion: Hutchinson Monarchs 2023
- Website: The Jayhawk Collegiate League

The Jayhawk Collegiate League is a collegiate summer baseball league consisting of eight teams from Kansas. The league was formed in 1976 and was a "Premier League" within the National Baseball Congress.

== History ==
The original league included the following teams: Derby Twins, Dodge City A's, El Dorado Broncos, Great Bend Bat Cats, Hays Larks, Haysville Aviators, Liberal Bee Jays, and the Mannsville Oklahomans ("Munsee") in Ardmore.

The Dodge City A's returned to the league in 2011 after leaving in 1981.

In 2019, The Derby Twins, Great Bend Bat Cats, Haysville Aviators, and El Dorado (formerly Wichita) Broncos went to the Sunflower Collegiate League, leaving four teams behind: the Dodge City A's, Hays Larks, Liberal Bee Jays, and The City OK's (former Oklahoma City Indians and Oklahoma A's). The Sunflower Collegiate League also has the Wellington Heat in Kansas and Woodward Winds in Oklahoma (former Jayhawk League teams in the 2000s).

== 2025 Season ==
=== Team Information ===
Team	Location	Stadium	2025 Manager(s) / Staff
Great Bend Bat Cats	Great Bend, Kansas	Al Burns Memorial Field	Roger Ward – Manager
Haysville Aviators	Haysville, Kansas	Plagens-Carpenter Sports Complex	Kyle Flax – Manager
Hutchinson Monarchs	Hutchinson, Kansas	Hobart-Detter Field	Marc Blackim – Manager
Junction City Brigade	Junction City, Kansas	Rathert Field	Micah Cannon – Manager
Kansas Cannons	Augusta, Kansas	Augusta High School	Doug Law – Manager; Rod Stevenson – Manager; Phil Stephenson – Head Coach
Kingman Islanders	Kingman, Kansas	Riverside Park	Jay Smith – Manager
Newton Rebels	Newton, Kansas	Klein-Scott Field	Chris Pate – Director of Operations; Kevin Pouch – Director of Operations
Derby Twins	Derby, Kansas	Panther Field	Jeff Wells – Manager

== NBC World Series Championships ==
The National Baseball Congress (NBC) World Series is an annual summer baseball tournament held in Wichita, Kansas since 1935. It features 16 top-tier amateur and collegiate-level teams from across the U.S., competing in a double-elimination format over about 16 days.

Originally founded by Hap Dumont as a “Little World Series” showcasing town and industrial teams—including Satchel Paige’s legendary performance in the inaugural tournament—the event evolved into a platform for future Major League players. More than 800 alumni have gone on to MLB careers, among them legends like Roger Clemens, Ozzie Smith, Barry Bonds, Albert Pujols, and Tony Gwynn.

Today, games are played at Eck Stadium and Equity Bank Park in Wichita.

- Clarinda A's 1981
- El Dorado Broncos 2009, 1998, 1996
- Liberal BeeJays 2010, 2000, 1985, 1979, 1968
- Wichita Broncos 1989, 1990
- Wellington Heat 2007
- Hutchinson Monarchs 2023

== Notable alumni ==
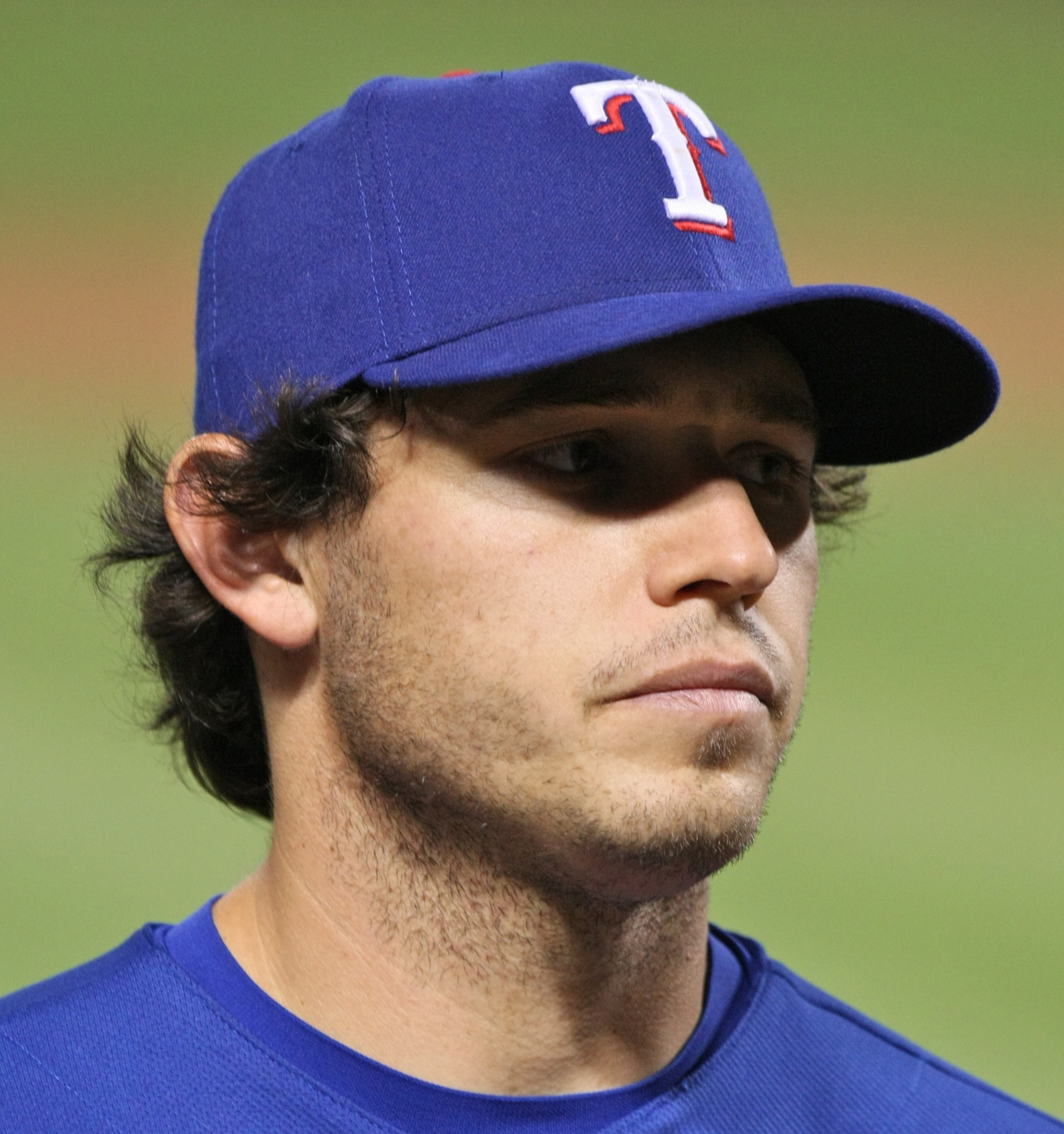
All Star Ian Kinsler

- Albert Pujols (Hays Larks 1999)
- Heath Bell (El Dorado Broncos 1997)
- Barry Bonds (Hutchinson Broncos 1984)
- Lance Berkman (Hays Larks 1995)
- Andy Benes (Clarinda A's 1987)
- Roger Clemens (Hutchinson Broncos 1982)
- Ian Kinsler (Liberal BeeJays 2001)
- Trevor Hoffman (Nevada Griffons 1987)
- Doug Drabek (Liberal BeeJays 1982)
- Nate Robertson (El Dorado Broncos 1996 & 1998)
- Brett Butler (Hutchinson Broncos 1978)
- Rafael Palmeiro (Hutchinson Broncos 1984)
- B. J. Ryan (Hays Larks 1996)
- Ron Guidry (Liberal BeeJays 1970)
- Chuck Knoblauch (Clarinda A's 1987)
- Jack Wilson (Hays Larks 1996)
- Pete Incaviglia (Hutchinson Broncos 1984)
- Hunter Pence (Liberal BeeJays 2003)
- Adam LaRoche (Derby Twins 1998)
- Troy Percival (Liberal BeeJays 1989)
- Mike Hargrove (Liberal BeeJays 1972)
- Greg Swindell (Liberal BeeJays 1985)
- Jake Sabol (El Dorado Broncos 2009)
- Tim Anderson (Dodge City A's 2012)
