= Kansas Stars =

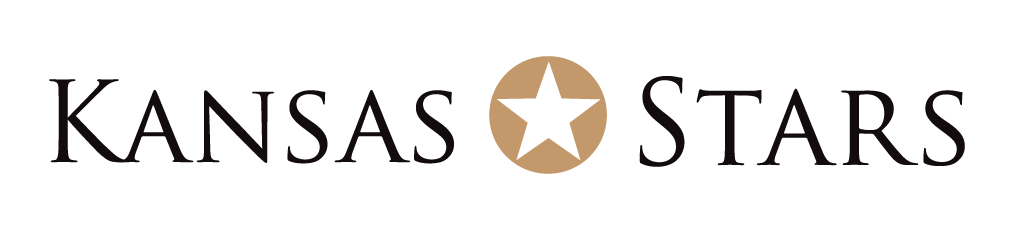
Logo
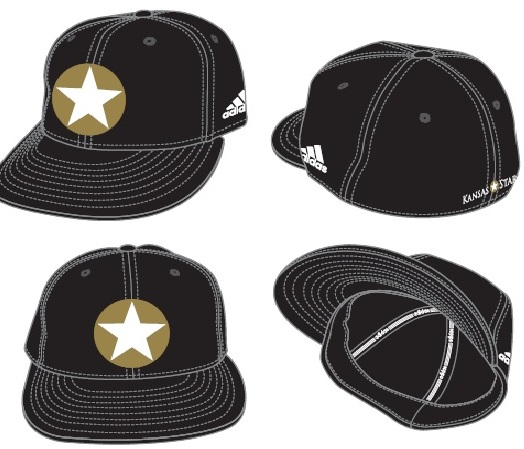
Cap insignia

Information
- Location: Wichita, Kansas
- Ballpark: Lawrence–Dumont Stadium
- Founded: 2016
- Nickname: The Stars
- Colors: Gold, Black, White
- Ownership: Kansas Star Casino
- Manager: Toby Keith

The Kansas Stars are an independent baseball team based in Wichita, Kansas, in the United States. The Stars were formed in 2016 to take part in the 2016 National Baseball Congress World Series, which is not affiliated with Major League Baseball.

The Kansas Stars were started by ex-MLB players Adam Laroche and Nate Robertson and sponsored by the Kansas Star Casino.

The Stars finished third in the 2016 National Baseball Congress World Series, losing in the semifinals to the Hays Larks in 17 innings by a score of 9-6. The Stars returned the following year and claimed the 2017 championship.

When playing, the majority of the Stars wear the uniform of one of the major league teams they played for but wear the Kansas Stars team cap.

The Stars announced in October 2017 that they would not play in the 2018 NBC World Series.

== Current roster ==
Kansas Stars Roster
Active Roster	Coaching Staff
Pitchers: -- John Lackey; 21 Jason Marquis; 22 Jake Peavy; 29 Nate Robertson; 31 Brad Penny; 36 Joe Nathan; 40 Brett Tomko; 44 Roy Oswalt; 52 Brian Gordon; 54 Tombo Martin; 82 Andy Sonnanstine; 91 Heath Bell; 92 Ryan Mattheus; 97 Joe Beimel; 99 Ben Sheets; -- Jeff LaRoche; Catchers: 55 Koyie Hill; 3 David Ross; 4 Mike Nickeas; Infielders: 25 Adam LaRoche; 26 Dan Uggla; 2 Jack Wilson; 15 Brandon Inge; 84 Andy LaRoche; 87 Jason Repko; 10 Chipper Jones; Outfielders: 5 Jonny Gomes; 17 Ryan Langerhans; 23 Matt Diaz; 83 Delwyn Young; 85 David Delucci	Manager: 29 Willie Robertson; Coaches: -- David Robertson; 17 Dave LaRoche; Disabled list; ‡ Inactive list; >§ Suspended list; Roster updated July 31, 2017 [ Transactions]
