= Santa Maria Indians =

Collegiate summer baseball team

Information
- Location: Santa Maria, California
- Founded: 1944
- Folded: 2008
- NBC World Series championships: 1982
- Former league(s): California Collegiate League; Central Coast League
- Former ballpark: Elks Field
- General manager: Clarence “Scoop” Nunes (1957-2003)

The Santa Maria Indians were a collegiate summer baseball team located in Santa Maria, California, founded in 1944 and folded in 2008. Former Indians managers include Butch Simas in the 1950s and Steve McFarland in the 1980s.

As a member of the National Baseball Congress, the Indians played many of the best semi-pro teams in the country including the Humboldt Crabs and their biggest rival the San Luis Obispo Blues. The Indians appeared in two National Baseball Congress World Series finals, losing in 1979 then winning the 1982 championship, beating the Anchorage Glacier Pilots 11–4 in the final. Right fielder Dave Hengel of the University of California was named MVP of the series.

The Indians folded before the 2009 season and a version of the team was resurrected in 2012 as the North County Indians in Templeton, California.

== MLB alumni ==
Ozzie Smith, Bryn Smith, Robin Ventura, Jim Lonborg, Mike Aldrete, Dave Hengel, Mike Batesole, Anthony Manahan, Dave Hajek, Tim Spehr, Torey Lovullo, Jimy Williams and Billy Bean.
