= Hap Dumont =

Raymond Harry "Hap" Dumont (December 26, 1904 – July 3, 1971) was a pioneering baseball promoter, journalist, and entrepreneur best known as the founder of the National Baseball Congress (NBC). Based in Wichita, Kansas, Dumont played a central role in shaping amateur and semi-professional baseball across the United States through innovative tournament formats, promotional flair, and community engagement.

== Early life ==
Dumont was born in Wichita, Kansas, in 1904 and graduated as valedictorian from Wichita High School (later Wichita East High) in 1923. He worked early in his career as a boxing and wrestling promoter in Topeka and Hutchinson before taking a position as sports editor at the Hutchinson News. In 1929, he returned to Wichita to write for the Wichita Eagle and manage a mail-order sporting goods business.

Dumont’s early baseball promotions included games staged for circus workers restricted from working Sundays due to Kansas' Blue Laws.

In 1931, Dumont established the National Baseball Congress and organized the first NBC State Tournament at Island Park on Ackerman Island in downtown Wichita. The tournament featured 16 teams and served the dual purpose of promoting Dumont’s sporting goods business.

The night after the 1933 state tournament final, Island Park’s wooden stadium burned down. Undeterred, Dumont persuaded city officials to construct a new stadium along the Arkansas River in 1934. He promised to host a national tournament to draw nationwide attention and tourism. The new venue, Lawrence Stadium, opened shortly thereafter and would later bear his name.

The inaugural National Baseball Congress World Series took place in 1935. Dumont famously offered $1,000—equivalent to over $22,000 today—to legendary pitcher Satchel Paige to bring his team, the Bismarck Churchills, to Wichita to compete. Dumont had no guarantee he could pay Paige, but was confident that the star power and spectacle would generate revenue. The tournament drew more than 100,000 spectators and attracted national coverage from The Sporting News. Paige and the Churchills won the championship, defeating the Duncan, Oklahoma Halliburtons in the final.

== Contributions ==
Dumont was known as “baseball’s man in motion” for his promotional ingenuity and showmanship. His contributions to the game include:

- Invention of the pneumatic home plate duster
- Early use of a 20-second pitch clock to speed up games
- Orange-colored baseballs for better visibility
- Microphones on the umpires to enhance the fan experience
- Women umpires in official tournament games
- Early morning (5 a.m.) games for overnight factory and aircraft workers

== Impact ==
Nearly forty years after the NBC’s founding, Jerauld R. Crowell and others helped establish the NBC "Hap" Dumont Youth Baseball League. The league began as an opportunity for children under age 12 and has since expanded to include eleven divisions ranging from ages 8 to 18. Youth tournaments are now held annually at regional, state, and national levels, with international teams also participating.

== Death ==
Dumont died suddenly in his office at Lawrence Stadium on July 3, 1971, at age 67. In 1978, the city renamed the venue Lawrence–Dumont Stadium in recognition of his enormous impact on baseball in Wichita and beyond. The stadium was demolished in 2018.
