= Boulder Collegians =

Collegiate summer baseball team

Information
- League: Front Range League
- Location: Boulder, Colorado
- Ballpark: Scott Carpenter Park
- Founded: 1964
- NBC World Series championships: 1966–1967, 1975, 1978
- Former name: Boulder Baseline Collegians
- Former league: Rocky Mountain Baseball League
- Manager: Tony Rouco

The Boulder Collegians are a collegiate summer baseball team located in Boulder, Colorado, founded in 1964 by Bauldie Moschetti, folded in 1980, and restarted in 2013 by Matt Jensen. The Collegians played many of the best semi-pro teams including the Humboldt Crabs, Alaska Goldpanners, and Anchorage Glacier Pilots. The Collegians beat the Alaska Goldpanners in the Midnight Sun Game 5–2 in 1969. The Collegians competed in the National Baseball Congress World Series every year from 1965 to 1980, winning the NBC World Series in 1966, 1967, 1975, and 1978. The team updated its nickname to "64s" in 2025 when it moved to the Front Range League.

== MLB alumni ==
Tony Gwynn, Joe Carter, Terry Francona, Rich Dauer, Burt Hooton, Bob Horner, Gary Allenson, Wayne Krenchicki, Steve Buechele, Spike Owen, Bobby Meacham, Mark Langston, Mickey Tettleton, Mark Marquess, Joe Maddon, Tom Nieto, Nick Capra, Bob Welch, Hubie Brooks, Joe Strain, Keith Moreland, and Dick Ruthven, Larry Hardy, Randy Moffitt, Leon Hooten, Nick Willhite.
