= David Ross (baseball) =

American baseball player (born 1977)

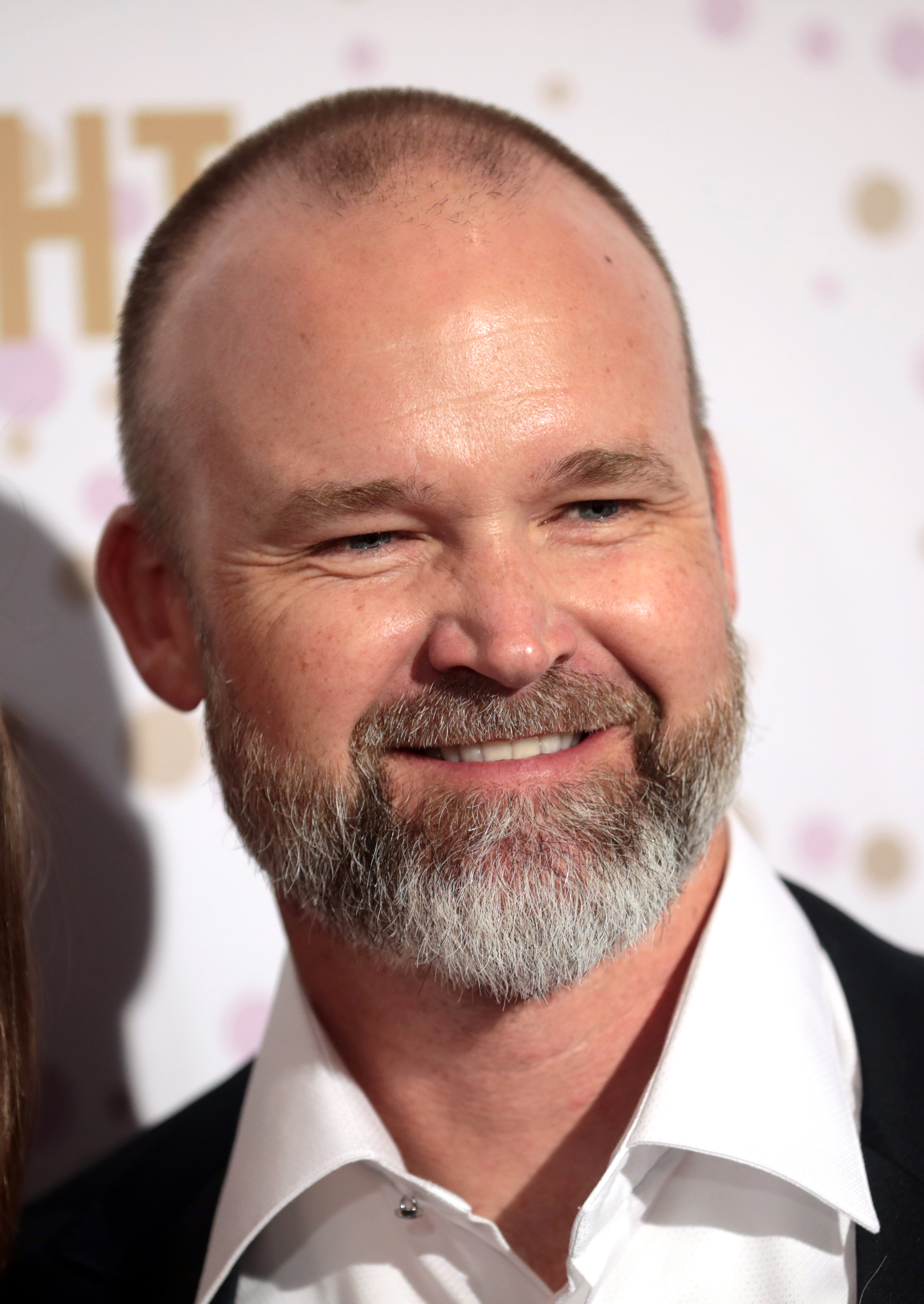
- Ross in 2022
- Catcher / Manager
- Born: March 19, 1977 (age 49); Bainbridge, Georgia, U.S.
- Batted: Right Threw: Right

MLB debut
- June 29, 2002, for the Los Angeles Dodgers

Last MLB appearance
- October 1, 2016, for the Chicago Cubs

MLB statistics
- Batting average: .229
- Home runs: 106
- Runs batted in: 314
- Managerial record: 262–284
- Winning %.: .480
- Stats at Baseball Reference

Teams
- As player: Los Angeles Dodgers (2002–2004); Pittsburgh Pirates (2005); San Diego Padres (2005); Cincinnati Reds (2006–2008); Boston Red Sox (2008); Atlanta Braves (2009–2012); Boston Red Sox (2013–2014); Chicago Cubs (2015–2016); As manager: Chicago Cubs (2020–2023)

Career highlights and awards
- 2× World Series champion (2013, 2016)
Medals
Men's baseball
Representing United States
World Junior Baseball Championship
Gold medal – first place	1995 Massachusetts	Team
World Junior Baseball Championship
Silver medal – second place	1994 Brandon	Team

David Wade Ross (born March 19, 1977) is an American former professional baseball catcher and manager. He managed the Chicago Cubs of Major League Baseball (MLB) from 2020 to 2023. He played in MLB for 15 seasons.

Ross played college baseball for Auburn University and the University of Florida and participated in two College World Series. He started his major league career playing for the Los Angeles Dodgers in 2002 and also played for the Pittsburgh Pirates, San Diego Padres, Cincinnati Reds, Boston Red Sox, Atlanta Braves, and Chicago Cubs. Ross had two World Series wins, one with the Boston Red Sox in 2013 and the Chicago Cubs in 2016. The Cubs named him their manager prior to the 2020 season.

== Early years ==
Ross was born in Bainbridge, Georgia, in 1977 but was raised in Tallahassee, Florida. David Ross Sr., played in a men's softball league, and his mother, Jackie, played basketball. Two of Ross's uncles were football players in college. He attended Florida State University's laboratory school, Florida High School, in Tallahassee, Florida, where he played high school baseball for the Florida High School Demons. Ross is one of five children.

== College career ==
Ross received an athletic scholarship to attend Auburn University in Auburn, Alabama, where he played for the Auburn Tigers baseball team from 1996 to 1997. In 1996, he played collegiate summer baseball with the Brewster Whitecaps of the Cape Cod Baseball League. The defining moment of his college career came in the semifinal of the East Regional tournament during the 1997 College World Series when he hit a walk-off three-run home run against Florida State to advance to the regional final. The Auburn Tigers would advance to the College World Series, getting knocked out in the 2nd round by Stanford. He transferred to the University of Florida after the 1997 season and played one additional season of college baseball for the Florida Gators baseball team in 1998. Ross is one of the few players to have played in the College World Series with two different colleges, first with the Tigers in 1997 and then the Gators in 1998. Ross decided to forgo his final season of National Collegiate Athletic Association (NCAA) eligibility after his junior season with the Gators after being drafted by the Los Angeles Dodgers.

== Playing career ==
=== Los Angeles Dodgers ===
Ross was drafted in the 19th round of the 1995 amateur draft by the Los Angeles Dodgers, but did not sign and accepted a scholarship to attend Auburn University instead. In 1998, the Dodgers drafted Ross again, this time in the seventh round.

Ross made his MLB debut on June 29, 2002, striking out as a pinch hitter. On September 2, 2002, with the Dodgers leading 18–0, the Diamondbacks put first baseman Mark Grace in to pitch after he volunteered, to rest the bullpen. Ross hit his first major league home run off Grace with two outs in the 9th inning, capping a 19–1 win. Ross's Dodger career was stalled, however, by the large number of catchers in the Dodger system. Paul Lo Duca was the starting catcher through most of Ross's time in Los Angeles, and teammates like Brent Mayne, Koyie Hill, and Todd Hundley competed with him for playing time. Ross stayed with the team until 2004.

=== Pittsburgh Pirates / San Diego Padres ===
The Dodgers sold Ross's contract to the Pittsburgh Pirates on March 30, 2005. After 40 games with the Pirates, he was traded to the San Diego Padres on July 28, 2005, for infielder J. J. Furmaniak. He played in 11 games with the Padres.

=== Cincinnati Reds ===
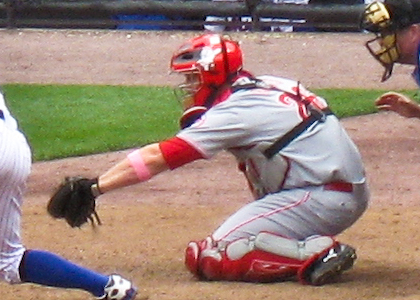
Ross playing for the Cincinnati Reds in 2008

The Padres traded Ross to the Cincinnati Reds during spring training for the 2006 season. On January 15, 2006, Ross signed a two-year, $4.54 million contract with the Reds.

While Ross was most often used as the "personal catcher" for right-hander Bronson Arroyo, whom the Reds received in a spring training trade with the Boston Red Sox for outfielder Wily Mo Peña, the consensus among Reds fans was that Ross had proven himself deserving of being the everyday catcher due to his better offensive numbers and that one of the other Reds catchers, Jason LaRue or Javier Valentín, should have been traded (possibly as part of a package deal) for a relief pitcher. LaRue was the one most frequently cited, but no deal was made by the July 31 trade deadline.

On November 20, 2006, LaRue was traded to the Kansas City Royals for a player to be named later. Ross's 2007 season started with four hits in 38 at-bats with no home runs and 17 strikeouts. On April 21, 2007, his slump hit rock-bottom when with runners on first and second base, he grounded into a rare 5–4–3 triple play against the Philadelphia Phillies. Ross finished the 2007 season with a .203 batting average and 17 home runs. On August 10, 2008, Ross was designated for assignment and was released on August 18.

=== Boston Red Sox ===
Ross signed a minor-league contract with the Boston Red Sox on August 22, 2008. He came up to the MLB club on August 29 and became a free agent after the season.

=== Atlanta Braves ===
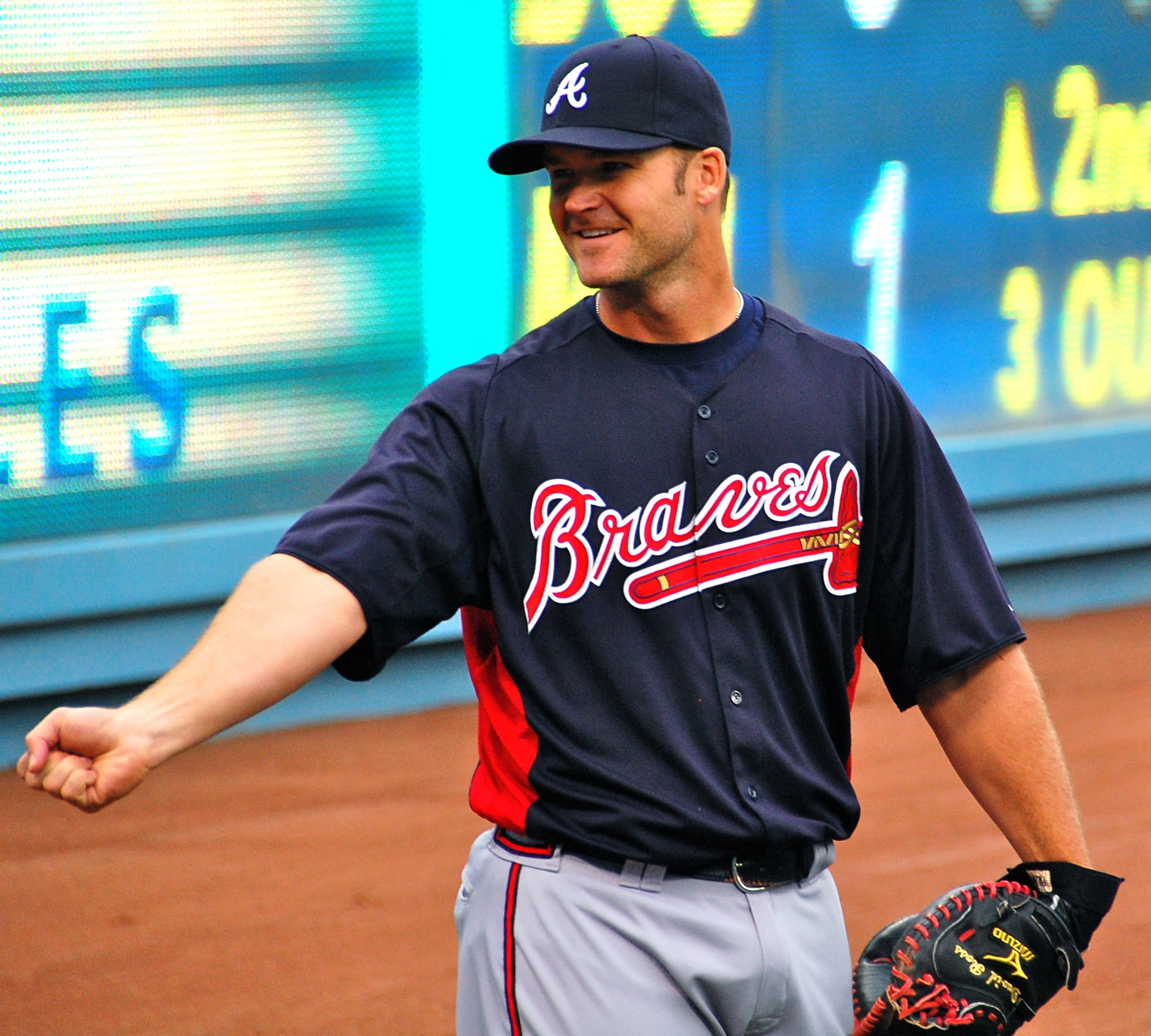
Ross with the Atlanta Braves in 2012

The Atlanta Braves signed Ross to a two-year, $3 million deal on December 5, 2008.

In 2009, Ross hit .273 in 54 games. On July 27, 2010, he signed a two-year extension to stay with the Braves through 2012. He managed to hit a career-high .289 for the Braves in 59 games in 2010.

Ross was the Atlanta Braves secondary catcher behind Brian McCann for his four seasons with the Braves. His hot start in the 2011 season (hitting .333 after starting seven games, with three home runs) highlighted his strengths, as Ross has always been known as a strong defensive catcher (in 2009, he committed one error in 52 games). Ross hit the first ever home run in the Wild Card Game when the new playoff format was introduced in 2012.

=== Boston Red Sox (second stint) ===
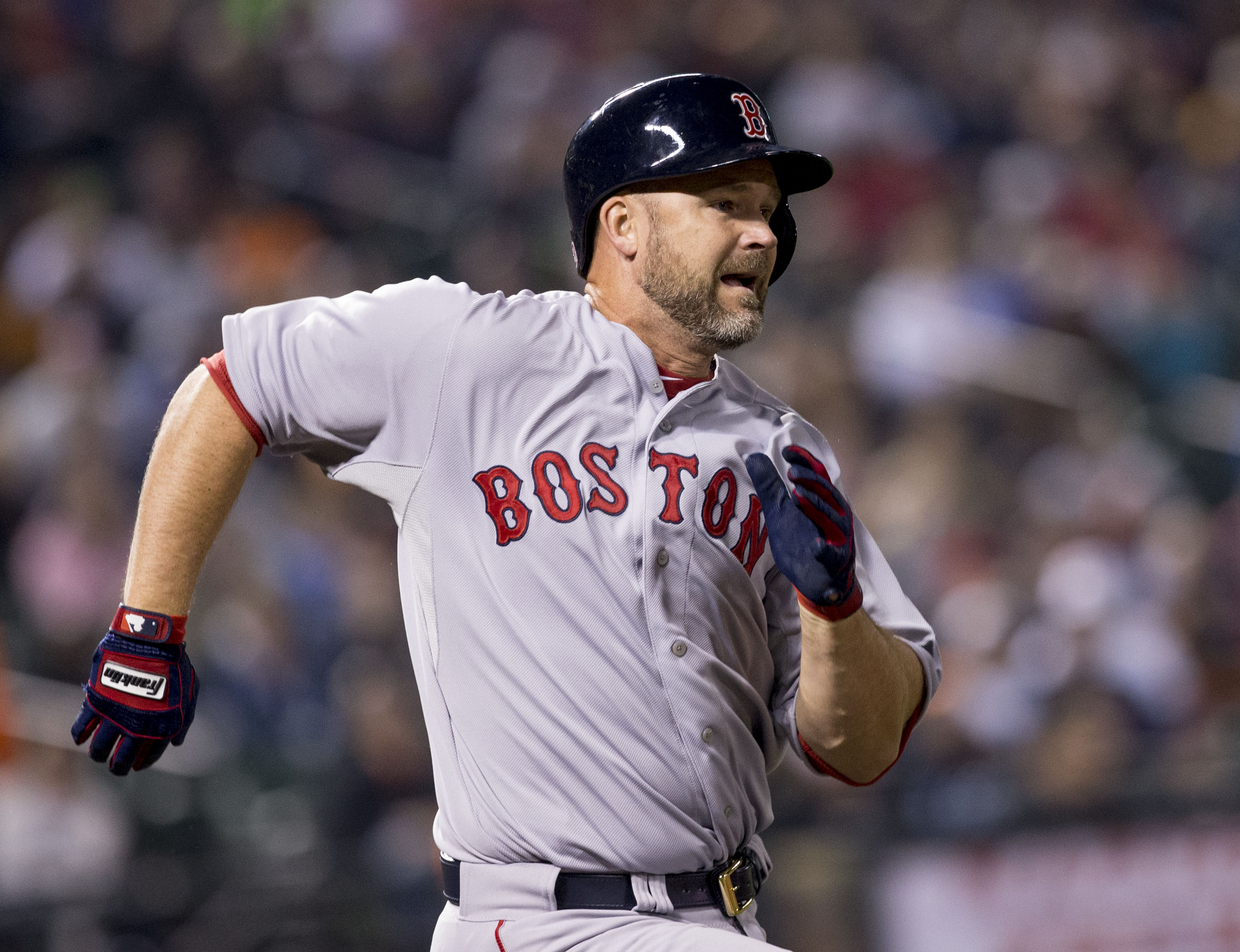
Ross with the Red Sox in 2014

Ross signed a two-year, $6.2 million deal on November 10, 2012, to return to the Red Sox as "more than a backup but not a starter" behind primary catcher Jarrod Saltalamacchia.

Ross suffered two concussions during the 2013 season and spent over two months on the disabled list; however, his health returned and he played a key role in Boston's run to the World Series championship over the St. Louis Cardinals that year, starting in four games during the series and driving in the game-winning run with an RBI double in Game 5. He was also behind the plate to catch the series-clinching out in Game 6 when Koji Uehara struck out Matt Carpenter.

In 2014, Ross played as Jon Lester's personal catcher.

=== Chicago Cubs ===
The Chicago Cubs announced on December 23, 2014, that they had signed Ross to a two-year, $5 million contract.

On May 9, 2015, in his first appearance as a pitcher in his professional baseball career, Ross recorded a perfect inning against the Milwaukee Brewers. On July 26, he repeated the feat against the Philadelphia Phillies, then led off the next inning by hitting a home run off of Héctor Neris.

On April 21, 2016, Ross caught his first no-hitter, against the Cincinnati Reds, his former team, with starting pitcher Jake Arrieta. Ross hit his 100th career home run off of Adam Morgan of the Philadelphia Phillies on May 27, 2016.

Ross announced his plans to retire following the 2016 season, after playing 15 seasons in the major leagues. During Game 7 of the 2016 MLB World Series against the Cleveland Indians, in his last at-bat of his MLB career Ross hit a home run, making him the oldest player to do so in World Series history at 39 years old. Additionally, Ross would become the only man to hit a homerun in his final at-bat in game 7 of a World Series. The Cubs went on to win Game 7 8–7 in 10 innings, earning Ross his second World Series ring. On January 14, 2017, the Cubs named Ross as a special assistant to baseball operations for the 2017 season.

=== Kansas Stars ===
Following his retirement from MLB, Ross joined the Kansas Stars, an independent baseball team made of former MLB stars who play an abbreviated tournament lasting a few weeks out of the year.

== Post-playing career ==
The Cubs named Ross a special assistant after his retirement. ESPN hired Ross as a baseball color analyst in January 2017.

== Managerial career ==
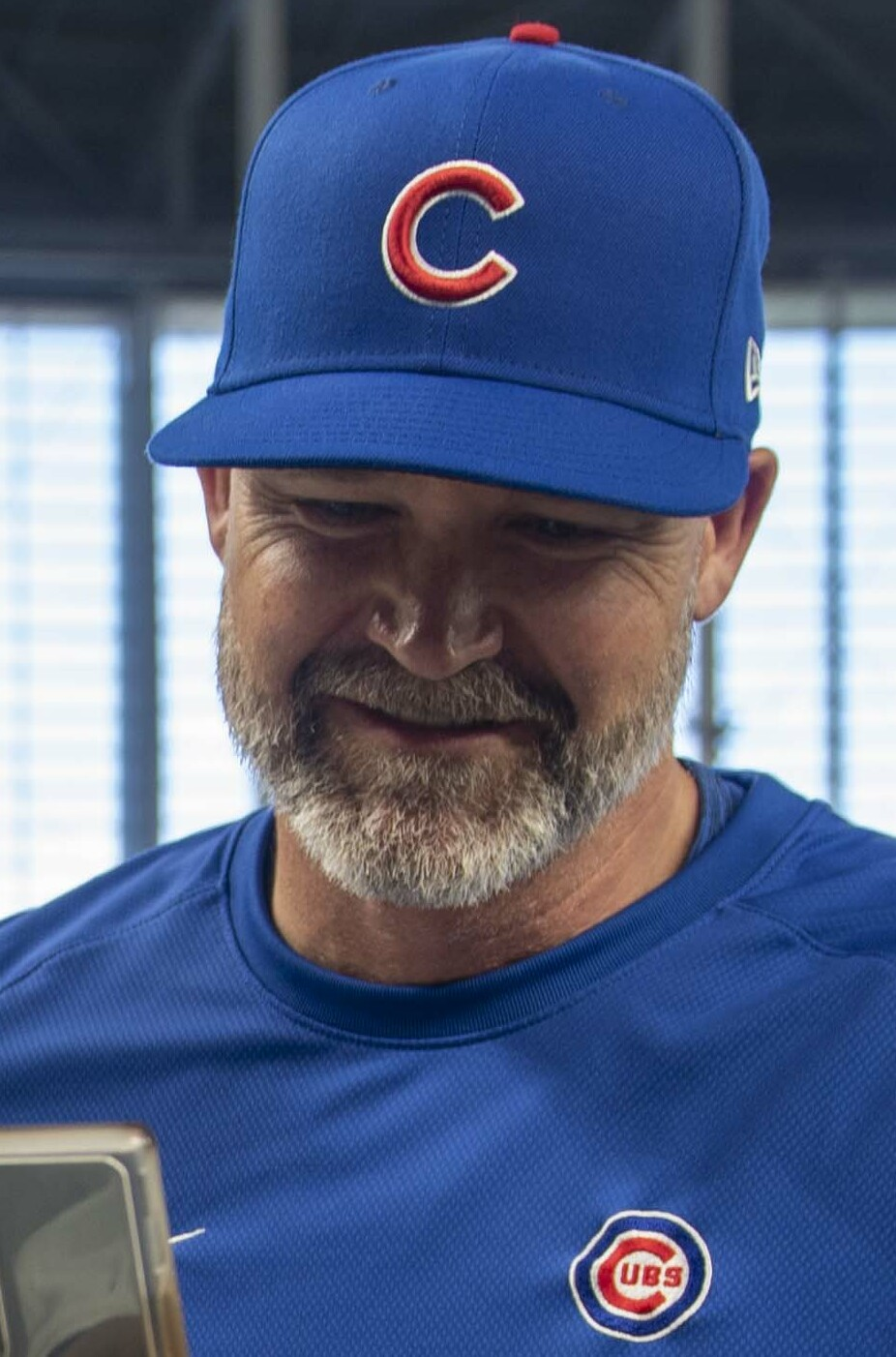
Ross with the Cubs in 2023

On October 24, 2019, the Cubs hired Ross as their manager to replace Joe Maddon, signing him to a three-year contract. Ross began his managerial career on July 24, 2020, with a 3–0 win at home against the Milwaukee Brewers.

On March 11, 2022, the Cubs announced they agreed to a contract extension with Ross through the 2024 season. The deal included a club option for the 2025 season as well.

Ross was dismissed on November 6, 2023, and Craig Counsell was hired to be the Cubs’ next manager.

=== Managerial record ===
As of games played on October 1, 2023

Team	Year	Regular season					Postseason			
Team	Year	Games	Won	Lost	Win %	Finish	Won	Lost	Win %	Result
CHC	2020	60	34	26	.567	1st in NL Central	0	2	.000	Lost NLWC (MIA)
CHC	2021	162	71	91	.438	4th in NL Central				
CHC	2022	162	74	88	.457	3rd in NL Central				
CHC	2023	162	83	79	.512	2nd in NL Central				
Total		546	262	284	.480		0	2	.000	

== Dancing with the Stars ==
On March 1, 2017, Ross was revealed as one of the contestants on season 24 of Dancing with the Stars and was paired with professional dancer Lindsay Arnold. Ross is the first professional baseball player ever to compete on the show. Despite only having the sixth-highest scoring average, Ross and Arnold outlasted higher-scoring couples and ended up placing runner-up to winner Rashad Jennings and partner Emma Slater.

== Personal life ==
Ross is divorced from Hyla Ross as of 2020. Together they have three children. As of 2016, they resided in Tallahassee, Florida.

Ross is a Christian. He has worked with several Chicago charities, including Cradles to Crayons, that benefits underprivileged Chicago youth.

Ross worked with author Don Yaeger, on a book titled Teammate: My Life in Baseball, which was published in May 2017.

Ross has made an appearance on Saturday Night Live, along with some of his teammates, to celebrate the Cubs championship win. Ross has also made an appearance in the recent commercials for "The Bryzzo Souvenir Company" as an intern trying to meet the standards and requests of his bosses, Kris Bryant and Anthony Rizzo.

== See also ==
- List of Auburn University people
- List of Major League Baseball players with a home run in their final major league at bat
- List of Florida Gators baseball players

Awards and achievements
Preceded by James Hinchcliffe & Sharna Burgess	Dancing with the Stars (US) runner up Season 24 (Spring 2016 with Lindsay Arnold)	Succeeded by Lindsey Stirling & Mark Ballas
