= Mark Ryal =

American baseball player (born 1960)

- Outfielder
- Born: April 28, 1960 (age 64); Henryetta, Oklahoma, U.S.
- Batted: Left Threw: Left

Professional debut
- MLB: September 7, 1982, for the Kansas City Royals
- NPB: April 6, 1991, for the Chunichi Dragons

Last appearance
- MLB: October 3, 1990, for the Pittsburgh Pirates
- NPB: May 21, 1992, for the Chunichi Dragons

MLB statistics
- Batting average: .211
- Home runs: 7
- Runs batted in: 31

NPB statistics
- Batting average: .286
- Home runs: 24
- Runs batted in: 88
- Stats at Baseball Reference

Teams
- Kansas City Royals (1982); Chicago White Sox (1985); California Angels (1986–1987); Philadelphia Phillies (1989); Pittsburgh Pirates (1990); Chunichi Dragons (1991–1992)

Mark Dwayne Ryal (born April 28, 1960) is an American former professional baseball player who played six seasons; for the Kansas City Royals, Chicago White Sox, California Angels, Philadelphia Phillies, and Pittsburgh Pirates of Major League Baseball (MLB). He also played two seasons in the Nippon Professional Baseball (NPB) for the Chunichi Dragons. He is the father of Rusty Ryal, an infielder for the Arizona Diamondbacks.

== Baseball career ==
Ryal attended Dewar High School and was selected in the third round (77th overall) by the Kansas City Royals in the June 1978 amateur Baseball draft.

== See also ==
- List of second-generation Major League Baseball players
