= Rusty Ryal =

American baseball player (born 1983)

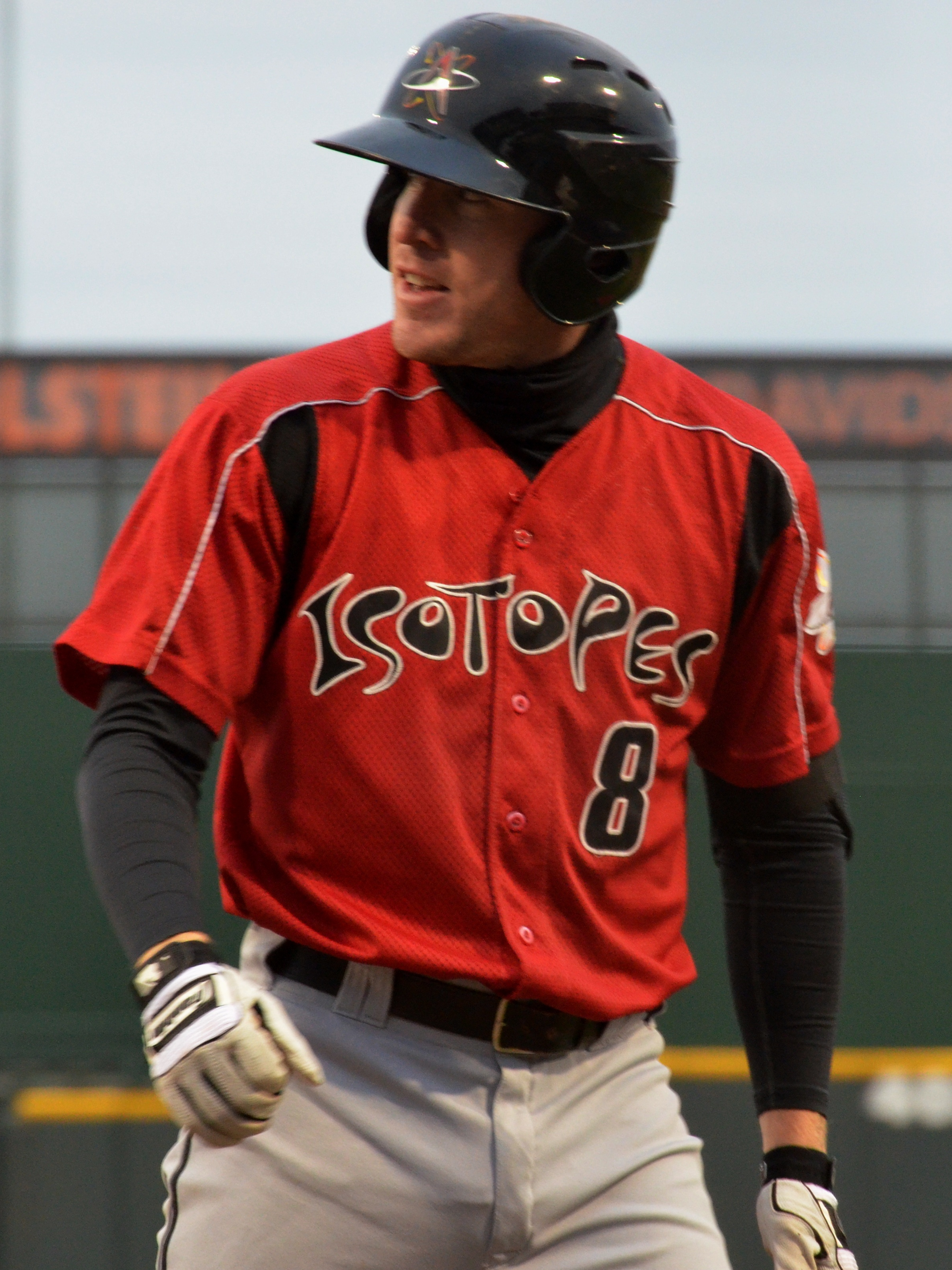
- Ryal with the Albuquerque Isotopes in 2013
- Left fielder / First baseman
- Born: March 16, 1983 (age 43); Ponca City, Oklahoma, U.S.
- Batted: Right Threw: Right

Professional debut
- MLB: August 10, 2009, for the Arizona Diamondbacks
- NPB: April 12, 2011, for the Yomiuri Giants

Last appearance
- MLB: October 3, 2010, for the Arizona Diamondbacks
- NPB: September 3, 2011, for the Yomiuri Giants

MLB statistics
- Batting average: .263
- Home runs: 6
- Runs batted in: 20

NPB statistics
- Batting average: .198
- Home runs: 0
- Runs batted in: 4
- Stats at Baseball Reference

Teams
- Arizona Diamondbacks (2009–2010); Yomiuri Giants (2011)

Rusty Allen Ryal (born March 16, 1983) is an American former professional baseball utility player. He was selected by the Arizona Diamondbacks in the 14th round of the 2005 MLB draft, out of Oklahoma State University. He is the son of the former major league player, Mark Ryal.

== Early years ==
Ryal attended to Perry High School in Perry, Oklahoma. Ryal played two seasons at Cowley County Community College and was a NJCAA second team All-American in 2003 and a two-time All-Jayhawk selection. He Played for the El Dorado Broncos.

== Minor League career ==
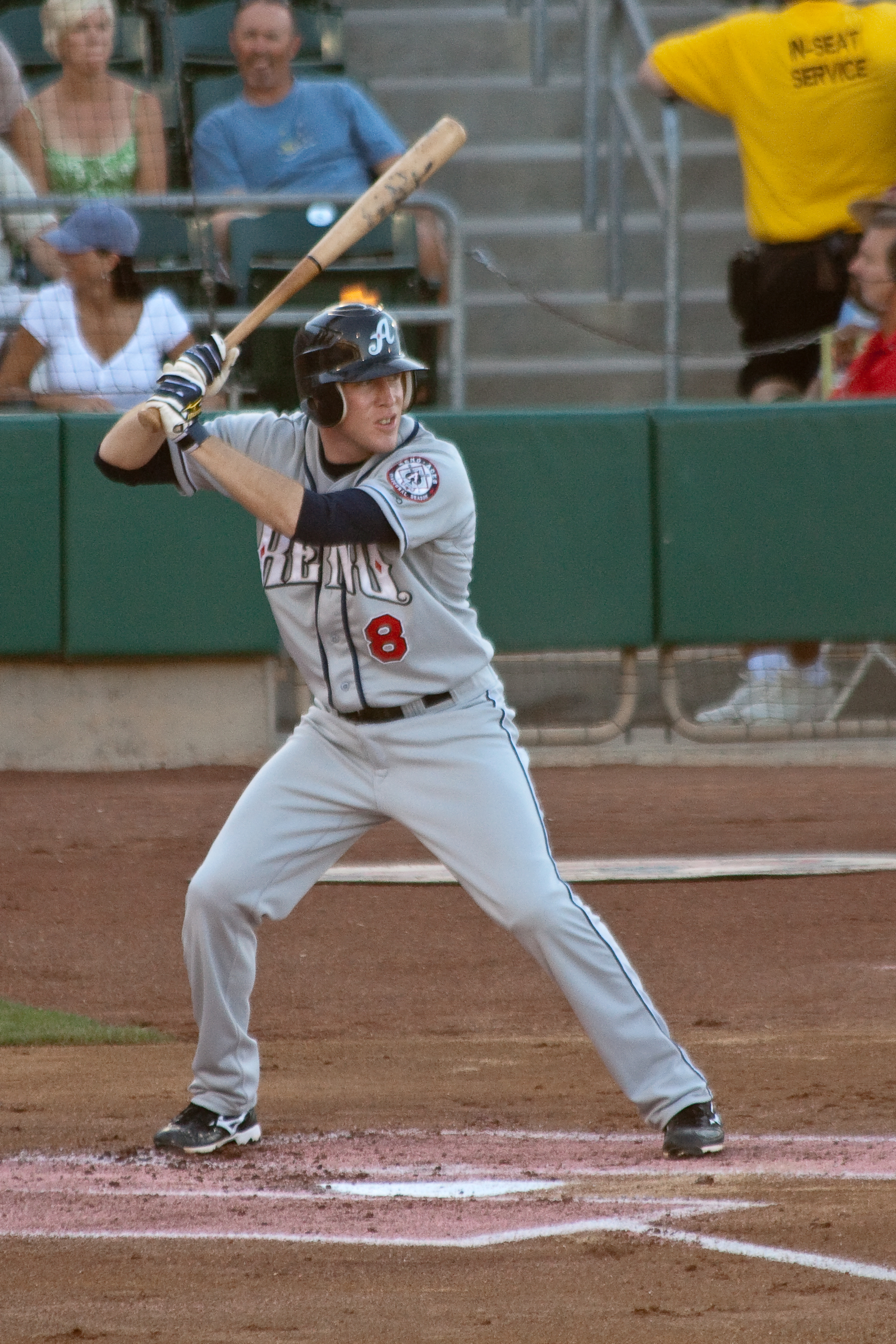
Ryal batting for the Reno Aces, Triple-A affiliates of the Arizona Diamondbacks, in 2009

In 2009, Ryal was an all-star with the Triple-A Reno Aces, batting .290 with a team-high 17 home runs and 70 RBIs. He also had 33 doubles in 103 games with the Aces.

== Major League Baseball ==
On August 10, 2009, Ryal was called up from the minors after the Diamondbacks demoted center fielder Chris Young to Triple-A Reno. In his first major league at bat, Ryal got a pinch hit single off of Elmer Dessens in the 8th inning against New York Mets. Ryal was 1 for 1 on the night. Ryal hit his first big league home run against Los Angeles Dodgers pitcher Randy Wolf. He hit the last home run ever hit against Randy Johnson on September 22, 2009, in the bottom of the 7th inning.

On December 23, 2010, it was announced that the Diamondbacks had sold him to the Yomiuri Giants of the NPB. He returned to Arizona on November 16, 2011, signing a minor league contract.

On July 25, 2012, Ryal was released by the Diamondbacks to make room for the newly acquired Tyler Bortnick. Ryal then signed with the Atlanta Braves on July 27 and was assigned to their Triple-A affiliate, the Gwinnett Braves.

In December 2012, he signed a minor league contract with the Los Angeles Dodgers and was assigned to the Triple-A Albuquerque Isotopes. He played in 106 games and hit .265, while spending the majority of his time at first base.

He was traded to the Los Angeles Angels of Anaheim on September 1, 2013, and was assigned to the Triple-A Salt Lake Bees.

On June 4, 2014, Ryal signed a minor league deal with the Philadelphia Phillies, and was released from the team's Triple-A affiliate on July 17, 2014.

== See also ==
- List of second-generation Major League Baseball players
