= Burt Hooton =

American baseball pitcher and coach (born 1950)

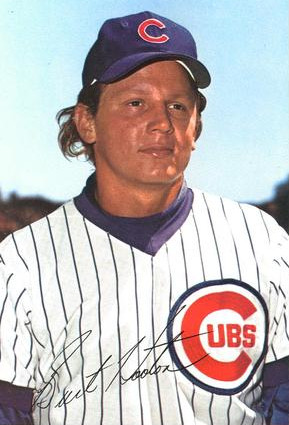
- Hooton in 1973
- Pitcher
- Born: February 7, 1950 (age 76); Greenville, Texas, U.S.
- Batted: Right Threw: Right

debut
- June 17, 1971, for the Chicago Cubs

Last appearance
- September 6, 1985, for the Texas Rangers

Career statistics
- Win–loss record: 151–136
- Earned run average: 3.38
- Strikeouts: 1,491
- Stats at Baseball Reference

Teams
- Chicago Cubs (1971–1975); Los Angeles Dodgers (1975–1984); Texas Rangers (1985)

Career highlights and awards
- All-Star (1981); World Series champion (1981); NLCS MVP (1981); Pitched a no-hitter on April 16, 1972

Member of the National College

Baseball Hall of Fame
- Induction: 2008
Medals
Men's baseball
Representing United States
Amateur World Series
Silver medal – second place	1970 Cartagena	Team

Burt Carlton Hooton (born February 7, 1950), nicknamed "Happy", is an American former right-handed starting pitcher and former coach in Major League Baseball. He won 151 games over a 15-year career, mostly with the Chicago Cubs and Los Angeles Dodgers.

Hooton's career began auspiciously with a no-hitter in his fourth major league game for the Cubs, and perhaps gained his widest recognition for his several playoff performances with the Dodgers. His only All-Star appearance was in 1981, when he also was named the NLCS Most Valuable Player on the way to helping the Dodgers to a World Series championship with four postseason wins in five appearances.

He was pitching coach of the Fort Wayne TinCaps, the Class-A affiliate of the San Diego Padres from 2013 to 2019.

== Playing career ==
=== High school ===
Hooton attended Richard King High School in Corpus Christi, Texas, leading the Mustangs to a 4A State Championship in the school's second year of operation in 1967. Hooton graduated from King in 1968.

=== College ===
Hooton attended the University of Texas at Austin, where he had a College Hall of Fame career, was a three-time All-American from 1969–71 and set several school and conference records. He also made the Southwest All-Conference team three times and was the team MVP in 1971. He posted a 35–3 record including two no-hitters within weeks of each other in 1971, one of which was a perfect game for 8 innings of a scheduled 7 inning game.

He played in the NCAA Tournament all three years, making it to the College World Series in 1969 and 1970. In 1969, the Longhorns came in 4th and Hooton made the All-Tournament team, and in 1970, the Longhorns came in 3rd. The Longhorns won conference championships all three years he was on the team.

Pitching for the Boulder Collegians in the summer of 1969, Burt started and won the 64th Midnight Sun Game, which was hosted by the Alaska Goldpanners of Fairbanks.

He was inducted into the Longhorn Hall of Honor in 1981. In 1998 he was admitted to the Texas Baseball Hall of Fame and in 2008 to the College Baseball Hall of Fame. In 2009, his number (#20) was retired by the Longhorns.

=== Chicago Cubs ===
After college, Hooton was selected by the Cubs with the second pick of the 1971 amateur draft. He made his major league debut with the team on June 17 of that year, but appeared in only three games before the end of the season, striking out 15 batters in one of them. He was the third player to go straight to the Major Leagues after being drafted without spending a day in the minors. He began 1972 in outstanding fashion, pitching a 4–0 no-hitter against the Philadelphia Phillies at Wrigley Field on April 16, the second day of the strike-delayed season. But he was unable to win consistently as the team's fortunes declined in the early 1970s, and he was traded to Los Angeles in May 1975 after compiling a 34–44 record with a steadily increasing earned run average.

=== Los Angeles Dodgers ===
The Dodgers were headed in the opposite direction from the Cubs, and Hooton was 18–7 with a 2.82 ERA over the remainder of the year, winning his last 12 decisions for a team record. After a disappointing 1976 season, he used his strong knuckle curve to become a valuable member of the pennant-winning teams of the next two years, leading the staff with 153 strikeouts in 1977 and with 19 wins and a 2.71 ERA in 1978. He finished second to Gaylord Perry in the 1978 Cy Young Award voting. Also in 1978, he finished 15th in Major League Baseball Most Valuable Player Award voting.

Hooton started Game 3 of the 1977 NLCS against the Phillies, but was pulled after issuing three consecutive bases-loaded walks in the second inning; the Dodgers came back to win, 6–5. In the World Series against the New York Yankees, he pitched a 6–1 victory in Game 2, allowing only five singles and retiring 14 of the last 15 hitters to tie the Series at one game each. But in Game 6, he left in the fourth inning with the Dodgers behind, 4–3, after giving up a 2-run home run to Reggie Jackson—Jackson's first of three in the game, all on the first pitch. The Yankees won 8–4, taking the Series in six games. The 1978 playoffs were rematches; in Game 1 of the NLCS against the Phillies, Hooton left after allowing three runs in the fifth inning, although the Dodgers still led, 7–4, and went on to win the game. In the Series rematch with the Yankees he won Game 2, leaving in the seventh inning with a 4–2 lead as Los Angeles held on for a 4–3 win to take a 2–0 Series edge. But Game 5 was another crushing defeat as Hooton was yanked after allowing four runs in the third inning for a 4–2 Yankee lead, with New York romping to a 12–2 blowout and their third straight win. The Yankees won again two days later for their second consecutive title.

After solid but unspectacular years in 1979 and 1980, Hooton enjoyed an 11–6 campaign in the strike-shortened 1981 season, posting a career-best 2.28 ERA and being named to his only All-Star team. He began the playoffs with a win against the Houston Astros in Game 3 of the Division Series, allowing only three hits, including an Art Howe solo homer, through seven innings. After the Dodgers won the series in five games, they went on to face the Montreal Expos in the NLCS; Hooton won Game 1, allowing only six hits before leaving in the eighth inning with a 2–0 lead. Returning in Game 4 with the Dodgers behind two games to one, he allowed only five hits and one unearned run before leaving in the eighth inning with a 3–1 lead; the Dodgers went on to a 7–1 win, and won Game 5 to advance to the World Series, again meeting the Yankees. Hooton was named the NLCS MVP for his two wins and perfect 0.00 ERA. He started Game 2 of the World Series, but took a tough loss after leaving the game in the seventh inning, behind 1–0 on an unearned run; the Yankees went on to win 3–0 behind the pitching of his former Dodger teammate Tommy John. But he came back with another strong outing in Game 6, leaving with an 8–1 lead in the sixth inning as the Dodgers won 9–2, taking their first World Series title since 1965. Because of his unassuming nature, broadcaster Vin Scully said that to celebrate, Hooton would probably go out and "paint the town beige." Hooton remained with the Dodgers for three more years, but with a combined record of just 16–21; he spent most of 1984 in the bullpen.

=== Texas Rangers ===
Hooton played his last season in 1985 for the Texas Rangers after signing with them as a free agent, going 5–8.

== Coaching ==
Hooton returned to the University of Texas to earn his degree in journalism and then began a career as a pitching coach. He first worked in the Dodgers organization in 1988 with the Class A Salem (Oregon) Dodgers. He moved up to the pitching coach of the Double-A San Antonio Missions from 1990 to 1994 and then in 1995–96 with the Triple-A Albuquerque Dukes. He returned to the University of Texas again, as the pitching coach from 1997 to 1999. In 2000 started the season as the pitching coach at Double-A Round Rock, a Houston Astros affiliate, before being named pitching coach of the major league club midway through the season where he stayed until mid-season 2004 when manager Jimy Williams was fired. Nonetheless, one of the pitchers he coached, fellow Longhorn Roger Clemens, won the Cy Young Award that season. In 2005, he returned to Round Rock as pitching coach until 2010, when the team moved to Oklahoma City, where he worked in the same position through the end of the 2012 season. In 2013, he was hired as the pitching coach for the Fort Wayne TinCaps, the Class-A affiliate of the San Diego Padres.

== See also ==
- List of Major League Baseball no-hitters
- List of baseball players who went directly to Major League Baseball

Preceded by Bob Gibson	No-hitter pitcher April 16, 1972	Succeeded by Milt Pappas
