= El Dorado Broncos =

American summer collegiate baseball club

Information
- Location: El Dorado, Kansas
- Ballpark: McDonald Stadium
- Founded: 1970
- Folded: 2021
- Former name: Hutchinson Broncs (1970–1984); Wichita Broncos (1985-1995)
- Former leagues: Sunflower Collegiate League (2019); Jayhawk League (1976–2018); Victory League (1970)
- Former ballparks: Hobart–Detter Field (1970-1984); McDonald Stadium (1996-2019)

The El Dorado Broncos were a summer collegiate wood-bat baseball club based in El Dorado, Kansas, in the United States, that began as the Hutchinson Broncs in the Victory League in 1970. The Broncos moved from Hutchinson to become the Wichita Broncos in 1985, before moving to El Dorado in 1996. The Broncos won the NBC World Series in 1989, 1990, 1996, 1998 and 2009, and were runner-up in 1987 and 1994. The Broncos folded in 2021.

== League and tournament wins ==
- 1982 Jayhawk League
- 1983 Jayhawk League
- 1984 Jayhawk League
- 1988 Jayhawk League
- 1989 Jayhawk League
- 1989 National Baseball Congress World Series
- 1990 National Baseball Congress World Series
- 1991 Jayhawk League
- 1995 Jayhawk League
- 1996 National Baseball Congress World Series
- 1998 National Baseball Congress World Series
- 2004 Jayhawk League
- 2009 Jayhawk League
- 2009 National Baseball Congress World Series

== MLB alumni ==
- Bob Hansen (Hutchinson Broncs 1971)
- Roger Slagle (Hutchinson Broncs 1973–1976)
- Pete Ladd (Hutchinson Broncs 1975–1977)
- Jeff Calhoun (Hutchinson Broncs 1977–1978)
- Brett Butler (Hutchinson Broncs 1978)
- Michael Brown (Hutchinson Broncs 1978)
- Lee Tunnell (Hutchinson Broncs 1979)
- Matt Williams (Hutchinson Broncs 1979)
- Charlie O'Brien (Hutchinson Broncs 1980)
- Barry Lyons (Hutchinson Broncs 1980)
- Spike Owen (Hutchinson Broncs 1981)
- Doug Baker (Hutchinson Broncs 1981)
- Steve Ontiveros (Hutchinson Broncs 1981)
- Mike Capel (Hutchinson Broncs 1981)
- Pete Dalena (Hutchinson Broncs 1981)
- Roger Clemens (Hutchinson Broncs 1982)
- Bryan Oelkers (Hutchinson Broncs 1982)
- Roger McDowell (Hutchinson Broncs 1982)
- Tracy Jones (Hutchinson Broncs 1982)
- Dan Plesac (Hutchinson Broncs 1982–1983)
- Greg Mathews (Hutchinson Broncs 1982)
- Ray Hayward (Hutchinson Broncs 1982)
- Don Wakamatsu (Hutchinson Broncs 1982)
- Mike Dunne (Hutchinson Broncs 1982)
- Dave Clark (Hutchinson Broncs 1983)
- Jeff Brantley (Hutchinson Broncs 1983)
- Marvin Freeman (Hutchinson Broncs 1983)
- Dan Radison (Hutchinson Broncs manager 1983)
- Rafael Palmeiro (Hutchinson Broncs 1983–1984)
- Barry Bonds (Hutchinson Broncs 1984)
- Pete Incaviglia (Hutchinson Broncs 1984)
- Rick Wrona (Hutchinson Broncs 1984)
- Mike Macfarlane (Hutchinson Broncs 1984)
- Joe Magrane (Hutchinson Broncs 1984)
- Mike Stanley (Hutchinson Broncs 1984)
- Nate Robertson (El Dorado Broncos 1996 & 1998)
- Heath Bell (El Dorado Broncos 1997)
- Rusty Ryal (El Dorado Broncos 2003)
