= Dave Hengel =

American baseball player (born 1961)

- Outfielder
- Born: December 18, 1961 (age 64); Oakland, California, U.S.
- Batted: Right Threw: Right

Professional debut
- MLB: September 3, 1986, for the Seattle Mariners
- NPB: April 8, 1990, for the Lotte Orions

Last appearance
- MLB: June 27, 1989, for the Cleveland Indians
- NPB: May 5, 1991, for the Lotte Orions

MLB statistics
- Batting average: .186
- Home runs: 4
- Runs batted in: 18

NPB statistics
- Batting average: .183
- Home runs: 4
- Runs batted in: 12
- Stats at Baseball Reference

Teams
- Seattle Mariners (1986–1988); Cleveland Indians (1989); Lotte Orions (1990–1991)

David Lee Hengel (born December 18, 1961) is an American former professional baseball outfielder. He played for the Seattle Mariners and Cleveland Indians of Major League Baseball (MLB).

Hengel attended the University of California. He played collegiate summer baseball for the Santa Maria Indians in 1982, winning the National Baseball Congress World Series MVP. He was drafted by the Mariners in the third round of the 1983 MLB draft.

Hengel was a Midwest League All-Star in 1984, leading the league in slugging. He was a September call-up to the majors in 1986, batting .190 in 21 games. He returned to Triple-A the following year and was a Pacific Coast League post-season All-Star. He hit .310 in 10 MLB games in September 1987. He was expected to challenge for an outfield spot in 1988, but hit .167 in 26 games. Seattle traded him to Cleveland on April 1, 1989 for minor leaguer Chuck Baldwin. In his final MLB season, Hengel hit .120 in 12 games. He became a free agent after the season.

Hengel joined the Lotte Orions of Nippon Professional Baseball. The Japanese team had tried to sign Hengel in 1988, while in the minors with the Mariners. In two seasons in Japan, he hit .183 in 21 games. He returned to Triple-A in 1992. In parts of six seasons in Triple-A, he hit 74 home runs.
