= Adam LaRoche =

American baseball player (born 1979)

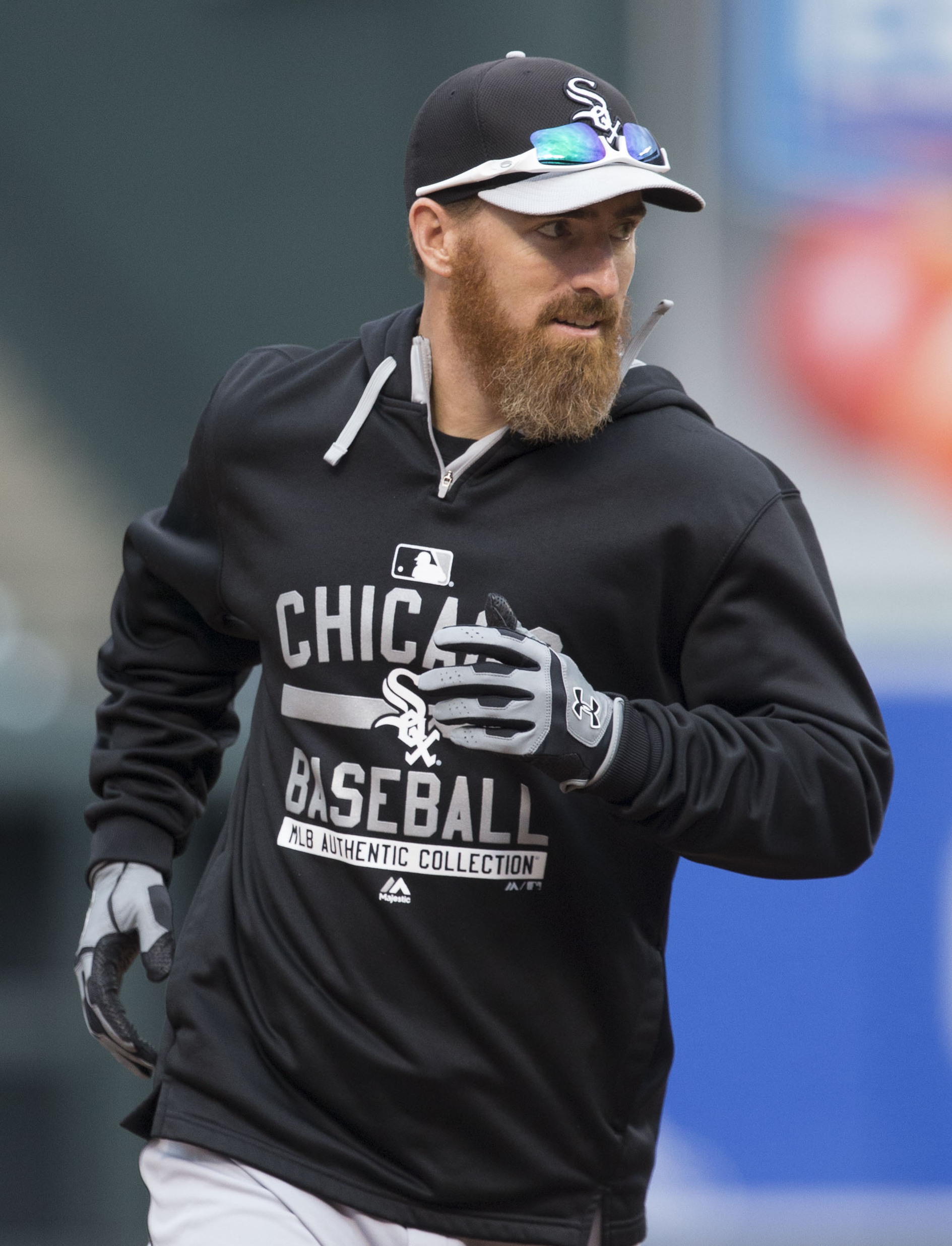
- LaRoche with the Chicago White Sox in 2015
- First baseman
- Born: November 6, 1979 (age 46); Anaheim, California, U.S.
- Batted: Left Threw: Left

MLB debut
- April 7, 2004, for the Atlanta Braves

Last MLB appearance
- October 2, 2015, for the Chicago White Sox

MLB statistics
- Batting average: .260
- Home runs: 255
- Runs batted in: 882
- Stats at Baseball Reference

Teams
- Atlanta Braves (2004–2006); Pittsburgh Pirates (2007–2009); Boston Red Sox (2009); Atlanta Braves (2009); Arizona Diamondbacks (2010); Washington Nationals (2011–2014); Chicago White Sox (2015)

Career highlights and awards
- Gold Glove Award (2012); Silver Slugger Award (2012)

David Adam LaRoche (born November 6, 1979) is an American professional baseball coach and former first baseman who played 12 seasons in Major League Baseball (MLB). He played for the Atlanta Braves, Pittsburgh Pirates, Boston Red Sox, Arizona Diamondbacks, Washington Nationals and Chicago White Sox. He is the son of pitcher Dave LaRoche and the brother of third baseman Andy LaRoche.

== Amateur career ==
Adam LaRoche is a 1998 graduate of Fort Scott High School in Fort Scott, Kansas, where he played baseball. He was named an All-American in baseball as a senior. His uncle, Dave Regan, was his high school head coach. He played for his father, Dave, at Fort Scott Community College in 1999 before transferring to Seminole Community College in Seminole, Oklahoma in 2000, where he was an All-American and the most valuable player of the Junior College World Series.

== Professional career ==
He was drafted by the Florida Marlins in both the 1998 and 1999 amateur drafts, but refused to sign. He was drafted by the Atlanta Braves in 2000 and signed with the team.

=== Atlanta Braves ===
For the start of the 2004 season, the Braves made LaRoche, who had not yet made his major league debut, their starting first baseman. The left-handed LaRoche platooned with 46-year-old veteran Julio Franco and put up a respectable .278 rookie batting average. LaRoche demonstrated his strong defensive skills at first base, but also a lack of speed running the bases.

LaRoche again platooned with Franco in 2005. While he did hit 22 home runs, LaRoche had a very streaky season. He hit .385 in his final 17 games of the year, but just .105 in the 19 games that preceded that streak. He batted .500 with a grand slam in the Braves’ 2005 NLDS against the Houston Astros. With the offseason departure of Franco, LaRoche became the Braves sole starter at first base in 2006.

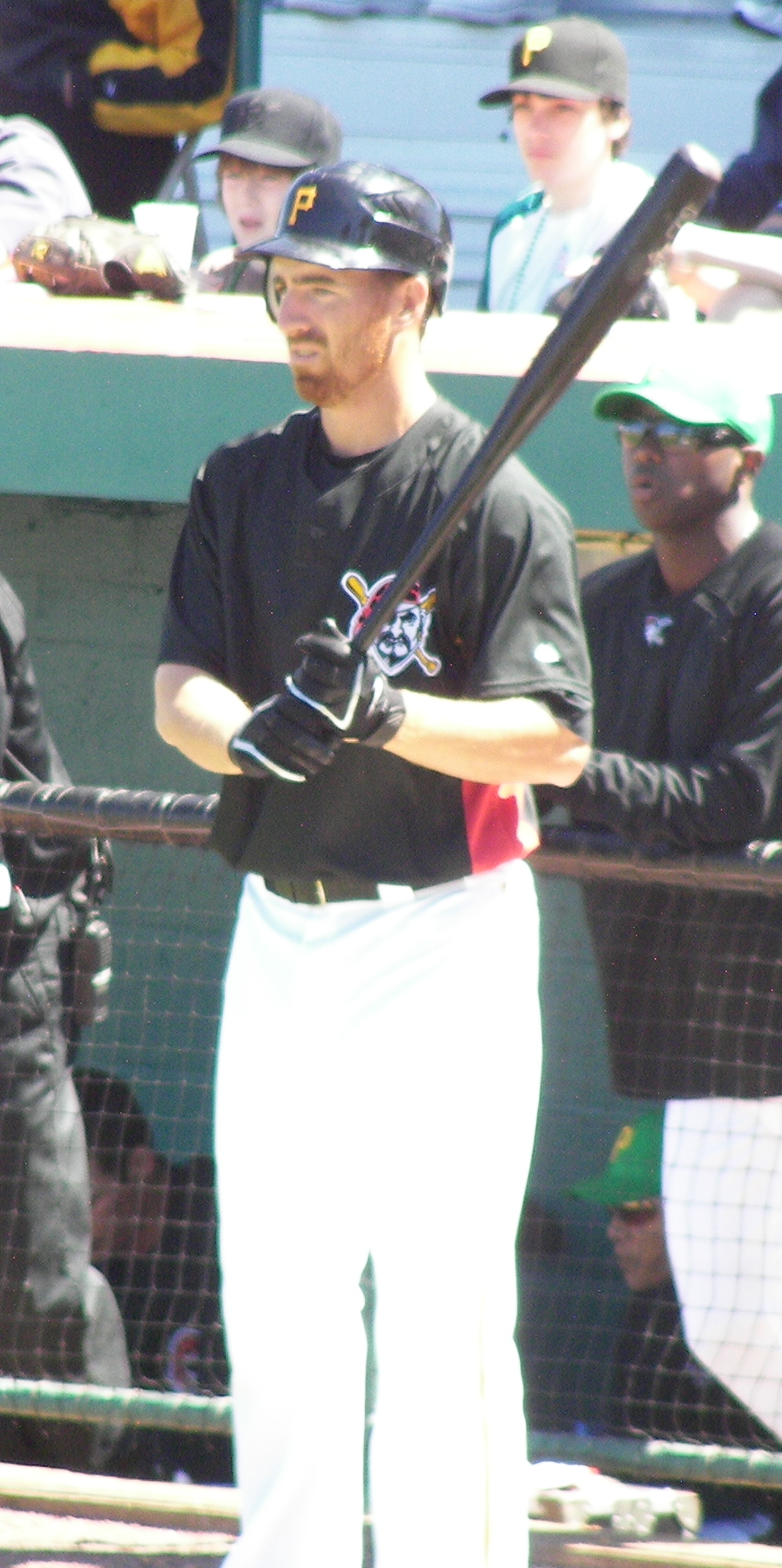
LaRoche with the Pittsburgh Pirates in 2007

On May 28, 2006, LaRoche contributed two of the Braves' record eight home runs in a remarkable win against the Chicago Cubs. In addition, in a wild game against the San Diego Padres on July 14, 2006, LaRoche hit two more home runs and had five RBIs to help the Braves to a 15–12, 11-inning win. He finished the year with a .285 average, 32 home runs, and 90 RBIs — all career bests.

=== Pittsburgh Pirates ===
The Braves traded LaRoche and minor league outfielder Jamie Romak to the Pittsburgh Pirates on January 17, 2007, for reliever Mike Gonzalez and minor league shortstop Brent Lillibridge.

During the 2009 season he played with his brother Andy LaRoche with the Pirates until July 22, 2009, when he was traded to the Boston Red Sox.

On May 13, 2009, LaRoche became the first player in major league history to have a home run taken away through the use of video replay.

=== Boston Red Sox ===
LaRoche was traded to the Boston Red Sox for minor league pitcher Hunter Strickland and shortstop Argenis Díaz. In six games, LaRoche would go on to hit one home run and three RBI, with an average of .263. During his brief tenure in Boston, LaRoche lived with his teammate J. D. Drew in Drew's home in Boston.

=== Atlanta Braves (second stint) ===
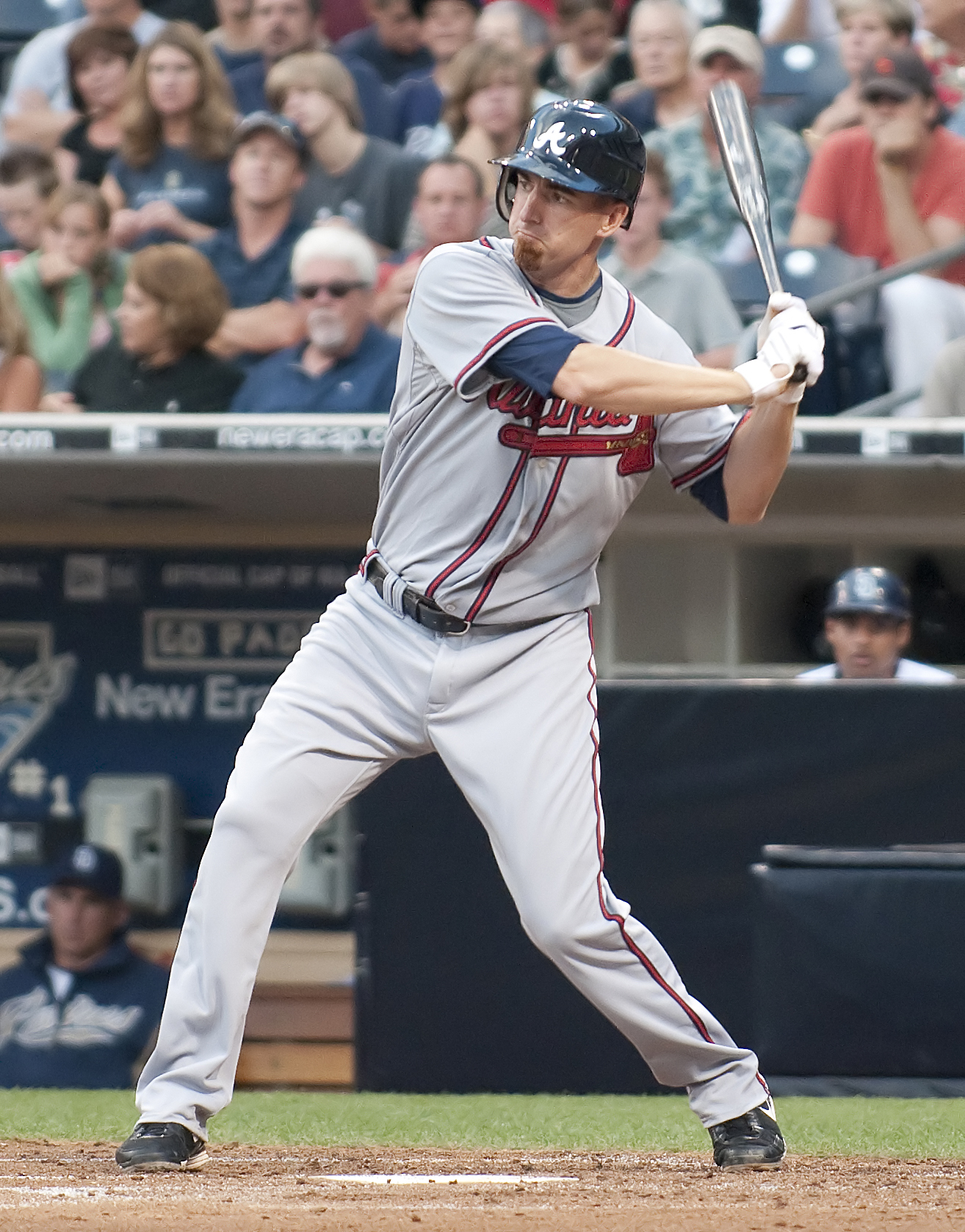
LaRoche batting for the Atlanta Braves in 2009

On July 31, 2009, after only spending six games with Boston, he was dealt back to his former team, the Atlanta Braves, in exchange for first baseman Casey Kotchman. LaRoche was traded by Boston in order to cut payroll and because they believed that Kotchman would be a better pinch hitter than LaRoche.

=== Arizona Diamondbacks ===
On January 14, 2010, LaRoche agreed to a 1-year, $4.5 million contract with the Arizona Diamondbacks. His deal included a $7.5 million mutual option with a $1.5 million buyout. In his 1-year tenure with the Diamondbacks, LaRoche hit .261 with 25 home runs and 100 RBI in 151 games.

=== Washington Nationals ===
On January 4, 2011, LaRoche agreed to a two-year contract with the Washington Nationals. His contract paid him $7 million in 2011 and $8 million in 2012 with a mutual option for $10 million in 2013. On April 7, LaRoche hit his first home run as a member of the Nationals, a game-winning two-run home run off Florida Marlins reliever Edward Mujica in the 11th inning of a 5–3 Nationals win. His 2011 season ended with labrum surgery on his left shoulder with career-low batting numbers of .172/.288/.258 (BA/OBP/SLG).

LaRoche's 2012 season began much more successfully, hitting .329 in April. He was a consistent bat throughout the season, driving in no fewer than 12 runs each month from April to August.

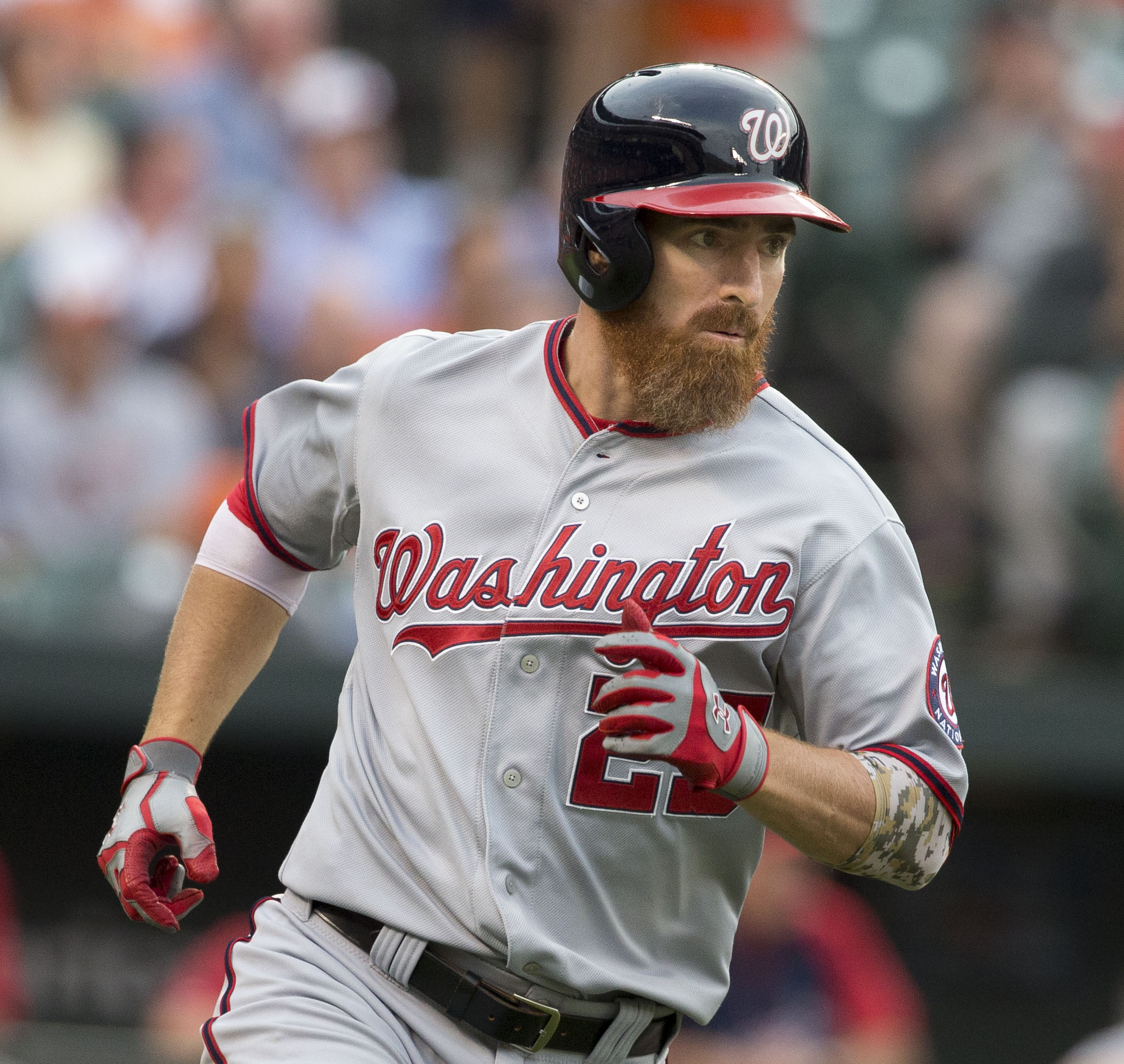
LaRoche playing for the Washington Nationals in 2014

In early September, LaRoche homered in each game of a four-game series against the Chicago Cubs (and hit five home runs overall). The only other players to match this feat are Hall-of-Fame sluggers Babe Ruth, Hank Greenberg, Yogi Berra, Johnny Bench, and Mike Schmidt.

On October 2, LaRoche reached two personal milestones. He hit his career-high 33rd home run, in the process tying a career high of 100 RBI. He earned his first Gold Glove and the Silver Slugger Award.

LaRoche declined his $13.3 million 2013 option on November 1 and became a free agent. Since the Nationals exercised their half, LaRoche wasn't paid a $1 million buyout. On January 8, 2013, LaRoche signed a two-year, $24 million contract to remain with the Nationals, that included a mutual option for 2015. LaRoche had a down year in 2013, hitting .237 with 20 home runs and 62 RBI in 152 games.

LaRoche had a bounce back season in 2014, hitting .259 with 26 home runs and 92 RBI in 140 games. After the Nationals were eliminated in the NLDS by the San Francisco Giants, the team announced they would not pick up LaRoche's $15.3 million option, with the intent of moving Ryan Zimmerman to first base.

=== Chicago White Sox ===
On November 25, 2014, the Chicago White Sox announced that LaRoche had been signed to a two–year, $25 million contract. LaRoche hit his 250th career home run off Detroit Tigers reliever Joakim Soria in a 4-3 White Sox win on June 6, 2015.

On March 15, 2016, LaRoche said that he intended to "step away from baseball." He said that he would honor a request from teammates to reconsider his retirement for a day or two before making an official announcement. On the next day, it was revealed that LaRoche's reason for a possible retirement was that the White Sox had placed a restriction on his 14-year-old son entering the team's clubhouse every day. By retiring, LaRoche walked away from a $13 million contract. The following day, teammates were close to boycotting their spring training game until manager Robin Ventura stepped in and told the players to play. White Sox executive vice president Kenny Williams defended his request by stating "name one job in the country where you can bring your child to work every day."

LaRoche said that his decision to retire was also shaped by a mission trip he took with The Exodus Road to southeast Asia to help undercover operators rescue children from sex trafficking. He felt baseball was no longer a top priority after working on that project.

== Personal life ==
LaRoche and his wife Jennifer have a daughter and a son. His hobbies include fishing, hunting, and golf. He is the son of former Major League pitcher Dave LaRoche and older brother of Andy LaRoche. LaRoche is of Mexican descent. According to his brother, Andy, their father's birth surname was Garcia, however, his father changed it to LaRoche at age seven, the last name of his stepfather.

LaRoche is a devout Christian. LaRoche helped the Washington Nationals promote "Faith Day" at Nationals Park along with teammates Denard Span and Ian Desmond. LaRoche was raised Christian but did not embrace his faith until asking himself, "Why are we here? What is our purpose on this earth?" He believes the answer is "to spread God’s word" and told The Washington Times, "I heard one chaplain put it this way: What do you want written on your tombstone? Do you want ‘Adam LaRoche: Gold Glove, batting average, hit so many homers, and has a million dollars in his bank account,’ or do you want ‘Adam LaRoche: Man of God, integrity, raised a great family, loving.’ Let's be honest: I don't know anybody who wants their stats."

After retiring, LaRoche focused on combatting human trafficking through work with a variety of non-governmental organizations, including a non-profit he and his wife founded called the E3 Ranch Foundation.

Diagnosed with ADHD during his high school years, a blunder in a 2006 game against the Washington Nationals is attributed to that condition. He picked up a Nick Johnson ground ball that should have resulted in the third out of the inning, but did not move quickly to step on first base. Johnson beat LaRoche to the base; the inning continued, and the Nationals scored four unearned runs. Washington won 8-1, and LaRoche was benched for the next game.

LaRoche is one of the co-owners of Outdoor Networks hunting show Buck Commander with friends and pro athletes Chipper Jones, Ryan Langerhans, Tom Martin, Luke Bryan, Jason Aldean, and Willie Robertson who is from the Duck Commander series.

LaRoche currently lives in Fort Scott, Kansas where he coaches baseball for his alma mater, Fort Scott High School. The team plays home games at “LaRoche Baseball Complex” whose construction was funded by LaRoche himself.

== See also ==
- Kansas Stars
- List of second-generation Major League Baseball players
- List of Major League Baseball career home run leaders
