= National Baseball Congress World Series =

American semi-pro baseball tournament

NBC World Series
- Frequency: Annual
- Locations: Wichita, Kansas, USA
- Inaugurated: August 1935 (Lawrence Stadium, Wichita)
- Next event: July 24 to Aug 2, 2025 (Eck Stadium and Equity Bank Park, Wichita)
- Participants: 16 NBC affiliated amateur teams qualify
- Organizer: National Baseball Congress
- Website: nbcbaseball.com

National Baseball Congress World Series or NBC World Series is an annual collegiate and semi-pro baseball tournament held in Wichita, Kansas, United States. The 2026 series is scheduled for July 23 through August 1. It will be held at Eck Stadium at Wichita State University in northeast Wichita, and the final championship game will be held at Equity Bank Park on the west side of the river in downtown Wichita.

Satchel Paige, Don Sutton, Tom Seaver, Ozzie Smith, Tony Gwynn, Barry Bonds, Roger Clemens, and Albert Pujols are just a few of the Major League Baseball stars who have played in the tournament.

When the national tournament started in 1935, participants were primarily town teams and industrial teams. Team rosters featured aging former minor league and major league ballplayers and players ineligible for major league baseball. In the mid-1960s team rosters transitioned to collegiate players, including prospects on the fast path to the major leagues. In 1975, the NBC World Series began recognizing a tournament participant who went on to a major league career as Graduate of the Year.

The first NBC World Series called the "Little World Series" was held August 13–27, 1935 at Lawrence Stadium in Wichita. National Baseball Congress founder Hap Dumont was director of the National Tournament Committee of Wichita that put on the tournament. Thirty-two teams were invited to the first national tournament. A focus was put on diversity with five teams classified as "integrated," one team consisted of Native American players and another of Japanese players.

Future Baseball Hall of Famer Satchel Paige was signed to a $1,000 personal appearance contract for the 1935 tournament. A victim of the baseball color barrier, Paige was not eligible to play minor league or major league baseball. Paige won four games, striking out 60 batters while leading the Bismarck Churchills to the first NBC World Series championship. He was named MVP of the tournament.

Dumont recruited Baseball Hall of Fame member Honus Wagner as the guest of honor at the 1935 opening night banquet. In addition to Wagner, celebrity guests who have been honored at the opening night banquet include: Stan Musial, Mickey Mantle, Dizzy Dean, Connie Mack, Allie Reynolds, Fred Clarke and Rin Tin Tin.

Teams bolstered by military service players dominated the WWII (1943–1945) and Korean War (1952–1955) tournaments. During these eras, major league players were serving at military bases across the country and playing for the base teams. 1953 World Series MVP Billy Martin played in the 1954 NBC World Series with the Goodland, Kansas Tigers. A new rule making major league "name" stars unavailable in National Baseball Congress tournaments was implemented following the 1955 NBC World Series.

== NBC Champions ==
Year	Champion	Runner-Up	MVP
2026	Santa Barbara Foresters	Alaska Goldpanners of Fairbanks	
2025	Hutchinson Monarchs	Lonestar Kraken	Jake Gutierrez (Hutchinson)
2024	Hays Larks	Hutchinson Monarchs	Garrett Gruell (Hays)
2023	Hutchinson Monarchs	Santa Barbara Foresters	Max Buettenback (Hutchinson)
2022	Santa Barbara Foresters	Hays Larks	Gavin Kash (Santa Barbara)
2021	Santa Barbara Foresters	Lonestar, Texas	Justin Eckhardt (Santa Barbara)
2020	Santa Barbara Foresters	Cheney Diamond Dawgs	Sean Johnson (Santa Barbara)
2019	Seattle Studs	Cheney Diamond Dawgs	Henry Cheney (Seattle)
2018	Santa Barbara Foresters	NJCAA National Team	Patrick Mathis (Santa Barbara)
2017	Kansas Stars	Everett Merchants	Ryan Langerhans (Kansas)
2016	Santa Barbara Foresters	Hays Larks	Jacob Patterson (Santa Barbara)
2015	Seattle Studs	Haysville Aviators	Connor Savage (Seattle)
2014	Santa Barbara Foresters	Seattle Studs	Jon Duplantier (Santa Barbara)
2013	Seattle Studs	Wellington Heat	David Benson (Seattle)
2012	Santa Barbara Foresters	Seattle Studs	Zach Fish (Santa Barbara)
2011	Santa Barbara Foresters	Peninsula Oilers	Mitch Morrman (Santa Barbara)
2010	Liberal Bee Jays	Seattle Studs	Paul Gonzalez (Liberal)
2009	El Dorado Broncos	Anchorage Glacier Pilots	Jake Sabol (El Dorado)
2008	Santa Barbara Foresters	Seattle Studs	Kevin Keyes (Santa Barbara)
2007	Lake Havasu City Heat	Hays Larks	Brad Arnett (Havasu, Arizona Heat)
2006	Santa Barbara Foresters	Derby, Kansas Twins	Jon Qualls & Matt Whitaker (Derby)
2005	Prairie Gravel (IL)	Santa Barbara Foresters	Ryan Annetsberger (Prairie Gravel)
2004	Aloha Knights (OR)	Mat-Su Miners	Scott Simon (Mat-Su)
2003	Chinese Taipei	Santa Barbara Foresters	Chang-Wei Tu (Taipei)
2002	Alaska Goldpanners of Fairbanks	Anchorage Glacier Pilots	Blake Gill (Fairbanks)
2001	Anchorage Glacier Pilots	Hays Larks	Jeff Francis (Anchorage)
2000	Liberal, Kansas BeeJays	Hays Larks	Cory Metzler (Liberal)
1999	Dallas, Texas Phillies	Peninsula Oilers	Marco Cunningham (Dallas)
1998	El Dorado Broncos	Nevada, Missouri Griffons	Jason Aspito (El Dorado)
1997	Mat-Su Miners	Nevada, Missouri Griffons	Jeff Juarez (Nevada)
1996	El Dorado Broncos	Tacoma, Washington Timbers	Kevin Frederick (El Dorado)
1995	Team USA	Hays Larks	Lance Berkman (Hays)
1994	Peninsula Oilers	Wichita Broncos	Jesse Zepeda (Peninsula)
1993	Peninsula Oilers	Beatrice, Nebraska Bruins	Jeff Poor (Peninsula)
1992	Midlothian, Illinois White Sox	Liberal, Kansas BeeJays	Mike Kane (Midlothian)
1991	Anchorage Glacier Pilots	Peninsula Oilers	Chris Hmielewski (Peninsula)
1990	Wichita Broncos	Midlothian, Illinois White Sox	Kirk Vucsko (Midlothian)
1989	Wichita Broncos	Grand Rapids, Michigan Sullivans	Jim Huslig (El Dorado, Kansas Broncos)
1988	Everett, Washington Merchants	Midlothian, Illinois White Sox	Dave Wong (Everett)
1987	Mat-Su Miners	Wichita Broncos	Ken Kreimers (Mat-Su)
1986	Anchorage Glacier Pilots	Grand Rapids, Michigan Sullivan-Polynesians	Steve Bales (Anchorage)
1985	Liberal, Kansas BeeJays	North Pole Nicks	Kerry Richardson (Liberal)
1984	Grand Rapids, Michigan Sullivan-Polynesians	Liberal, Kansas BeeJays	Bill Bates (Grand Rapids)
1983	Grand Rapids, Michigan Sullivan-Polynesians	Alaska Goldpanners of Fairbanks	Curtis Morgan (Grand Rapids)
1982	Santa Maria, California Indians	Anchorage Glacier Pilots	Dave Hengel (Santa Maria)
1981	Clarinda, Iowa A's	Liberal, Kansas BeeJays	Keith Mucha (Clarinda)
1980	Alaska Goldpanners of Fairbanks	Liberal, Kansas BeeJays	Kevin McReynolds (Fairbanks)
1979	Liberal, Kansas BeeJays	Santa Maria, California Indians	Gary D'Onofrio (Liberal)
1978	Boulder Collegians	Rapid City, South Dakota Macy's Diesels	Bob Ferris (Boulder)
1977	Peninsula Oilers	Alaska Goldpanners of Fairbanks	Bob Skube (Peninsula)
1976	Alaska Goldpanners of Fairbanks	Anchorage Glacier Pilots	Greg Harris (Fairbanks)
1975	Boulder Collegians	Alaska Goldpanners of Fairbanks	Mike Colbern (Boulder)
1974	Alaska Goldpanners of Fairbanks	Boulder Collegians	Steve Kemp (Fairbanks)
1973	Alaska Goldpanners of Fairbanks	Liberal, Kansas BeeJays	Lee Iorg (Fairbanks)
1972	Alaska Goldpanners of Fairbanks	Anchorage Glacier Pilots	Kerry Dineen (Fairbanks)
1971	Anchorage Glacier Pilots	Alaska Goldpanners of Fairbanks	Bruce Bochte (Anchorage)
1970	Grand Rapids, Michigan Sullivan-Polynesians	Anchorage Glacier Pilots	Al Gerhardt (Grand Rapids)
1969	Anchorage Glacier Pilots	Liberal, Kansas BeeJays	Chris Chambliss (Anchorage)
1968	Liberal, Kansas BeeJays	Jackson, Mississippi Braves	Joe Tanner (Jackson)
1967	Boulder Collegians	Honolulu, Hawaii Islanders	Frank Duffy (Boulder)
1966	Boulder Collegians	West Point, Mississippi Packers	Ray Henningsen (Boulder)
1965	Wichita, Kansas Dreamliners	Liberal, Kansas BeeJays	Bob Boyd (Wichita Dreamliners)
1964	Wichita, Kansas Glassmen	Alaska Goldpanners of Fairbanks	Dick Sanders (Wichita, Kansas Service Auto)
1963	Wichita, Kansas Dreamliners	Ponchatoula, Louisiana Athletics	Sam Suplizio (Fairbanks)
1962	Wichita, Kansas Dreamliners	Alaska Goldpanners of Fairbanks	Rocky Krsnich (Wichita, Kansas Rapid Transit)
1961	Ponchatoula, Louisiana Athletics	Grand Rapids, Michigan Sullivan-Polynesians	Al Ware (Grand Rapids)
1960	Grand Rapids, Michigan Sullivan-Polynesians	Ponchatoula, Louisiana Athletics	Bob Seltzer (Tampa-Gibsonton, Florida)
1959	Houston, Texas Fed	Elgin, Illinois Athletics	Clyde Girrens (Wichita, Kansas Weller)
1958	Drain, Oregon Black Sox	Alpine, Texas Cowboys	Jim O'Rourke (Drain, Oregon Black Sox)
1957	Sinton, Texas Plymouth Oilers	Fort Wayne, Indiana Dairymen	Wilmer Fields (Fort Wayne)
1956	Fort Wayne, Indiana Dairymen	Deming, Washington Loggers	Clyde McCullough (Alpine, Texas Cowboys)
1955	Wichita, Kansas Boeing Bombers	Sinton, Texas Plymouth Oilers	Daryl Spencer (Boeing)
1954	Wichita, Kansas Boeing Bombers	Springfield, Missouri Generals	Don Lee (Casa Grande, Arizona Cotton Kings)
1953	Fort Leonard Wood Hilltoppers	Wichita, Kansas Boeing Bombers	Robert McKee (Fort Leonard Wood)
1952	Fort Myer Military District of WA	Fort Leonard Wood Hilltoppers	Danny O'Connell (Fort Myer)
1951	Sinton, Texas Plymouth Oilers	Atwater, California Packers	Steve Rapach (Sinton)
1950	Fort Wayne, Indiana Capeharts	Elk City, Oklahoma Elks	Pat Scantlebury (Fort Wayne)
1949	Fort Wayne, Indiana G-E Club	Golden, Colorado Coors	Bill Ricks (Fort Wayne)
1948	Fort Wayne, Indiana G-E Club	Elkin, North Carolina Chatham Blanketeers	Veo Story (Elkin)
1947	Fort Wayne, Indiana G-E Club	Golden, Colorado Coors	Bruno Konopka (Golden)
1946	St. Joseph, Michigan Auscos	Carmichael, California Firemen	Les Lollis (Carmichael)
1945	Enid Army Air Field	Orlando Army Air Base	Cot Deal (Enid)
1944	Sherman Field, Kansas Flyers	Enid Army Air Field	Cot Deal (Enid)
1943	Camp Wheeler, Georgia Spokes	Enid Army Air Field	George Archie (Fort Riley, Kansas CRTC)
1942	Wichita, Kansas Boeing Bombers	Waco, Texas Dons	Ed Borom (Boeing Bombers)
1941	Enid, Oklahoma Champlins	Waco, Texas Dons	Red Barkley (Enid)
1940	Enid, Oklahoma Champlins	Mount Pleasant, Texas Cubs	Vance Cauble (Enid)
1939	Duncan, Oklahoma Halliburtons	Mount Pleasant, Texas Cubs	Roy Helser (Silverton, Oregon Red Sox)
1938	Buford, Georgia Bona Allens	Enid, Oklahoma Eason Oilers	Andy Johnson (Buford)
1937	Enid, Oklahoma Eason Oilers	Buford, Georgia Bona Allens	Claude Gilchrist (Enid)
1936	Duncan, Oklahoma Halliburtons	Buford, Georgia Bona Allens	Harry White (Duncan)
1935	Bismarck, North Dakota Churchills	Duncan, Oklahoma Halliburtons	Satchel Paige (Bismarck)

NBC World Series Champions and MVPs.

== NBC Graduate of the Year ==
Year	Player	MLB Team	NBC Team(s)
2022	C. J. Cron	Los Angeles Angels	
2021	Jeff McNeil	New York Mets	Santa Barbara Foresters (2010 & 2011)
2020	Tim Anderson	Chicago White Sox	Dodge City A's
2019	Jed Lowrie	New York Mets	Anchorage Glacier Pilots (2011)
2018	Aaron Judge	New York Yankees	Anchorage Glacier Pilots (2011)
2017	Danny Valencia	Baltimore Orioles	Anchorage Glacier Pilots (2005)
2016	Ian Kinsler	Detroit Tigers	Liberal BeeJays (2001)
2015	Hunter Pence	San Francisco Giants	Liberal BeeJays (2003)
2012	Michael Young	Texas Rangers	Alaska Goldpanners (1996)
2011	Heath Bell	San Diego Padres	El Dorado Broncos (1997)
2010	Mark Teixeira	New York Yankees	Maryland Battlecats (1998)
2009	Tim Lincecum	San Francisco Giants	Seattle Studs (2004)
2008	Joba Chamberlain	New York Yankees	Beatrice Bruins (2004 & 2005)
2007	Jeff Francis	Colorado Rockies	Anchorage Glacier Pilots (2001)
2006	B. J. Ryan	Toronto Blue Jays	Hays Larks (1996)
2005	Morgan Ensberg	Houston Astros	Santa Barbara Foresters (1996)
2004	Nate Robertson	Detroit Tigers	El Dorado Broncos (1996 & 1998)
2003	Albert Pujols	St. Louis Cardinals	Hays Larks (1999)
2002	Lance Berkman	Houston Astros	Hays Larks (1995)
2001	Luis Gonzalez	Arizona Diamondbacks	North Pole Nicks (1987)
2000	Eric Karros	Los Angeles Dodgers	North Pole Nicks (1987)
1999	Trevor Hoffman	San Diego Padres	Nevada Griffons (1987)
1998	Robin Ventura	Chicago White Sox	Santa Marian Indians (1986)
1997	Brett Butler	Los Angeles Dodgers	OK City Utility Towers (1977)/Hutchinson Broncos (1978)
1996	Chuck Knoblauch	Minnesota Twins	Clarinda A's (1987)
1995	Mark Grace	Chicago Cubs	North Pole Nicks (1985)
1994	Jimmy Key	New York Yankees	Kenai Peninsula Oilers (1981)
1993	Barry Bonds	San Francisco Giants	Fairbanks Goldpanners (1983)/Hutchinson Broncos (1984)
1992	Andy Benes	San Diego Padres	Clarinda A's (1987)
1991	Bob Welch	Oakland A's	Boulder Collegians (1976)
1990	John Olerud	Toronto Blue Jays	Kenai Peninsula Oilers (1988)
1989	Rafael Palmeiro	Texas Rangers	Hutchinson Broncos (1984)
1988	Mark McGwire	Oakland A's	Anchorage Glacier Pilots (1982)
1987	Joe Carter	Cleveland Indians	Boulder Collegians (1979)
1986	Roger Clemens	Boston Red Sox	Hutchinson Broncos (1982)
1985	Tony Gwynn	San Diego Padres	Boulder Collegians (1980)
1984	Ron Kittle	Chicago White Sox	Chicago AHEPA (1978)
1983	Dave Stieb	Toronto Blue Jays	Kenai Peninsula Oilers (1977 & 1978)
1982	Steve Rogers	Montreal Expos	Liberal Bee Jays (1980)
1981	Steve Kemp	Pittsburgh Pirates	Liberal BeeJays (1973)/Fairbanks (1974)
1980	Bruce Bochte	Oakland A's	Humboldt Crabs (1969)/Anchorage Glacier Pilots (1971)
1979	Dave Winfield	San Diego Padres	Fairbanks Goldpanners (1971 & 1972)
1978	Ron Guidry	New York Yankees	Liberal Bee Jays (1970)
1977	Chris Chambliss	Atlanta Braves	Anchorage Glacier Pilots (1969)
1976	Randy Jones	New York Mets	Anchorage Glacier Pilots (1971)
1975	Mike Hargrove	Cleveland Indians	Liberal BeeJays (1972)

Since 1975 the NBC World Series has recognized a former participant as "Graduate of the Year".

== History ==
=== Founder ===
Founder Raymond Harry "Hap" Dumont (1904–1971) spent his career working in sports. Early in life, he was a sports editor for newspapers in Wichita and Hutchinson. He also promoted boxing and wrestling matches. When the opportunity arose, he sold sporting equipment, succeeding in the mail-order business even as the great depression lingered.

Dumont got his start promoting baseball with a game between circus clowns and firemen in 1925. Kansas had blue laws at the time that limited business activities on Sundays; that included the circus but not baseball. Sparks Bros Circus clowns and roustabouts inquired about playing a local baseball team to earn some extra money on their day off. Dumont setup the game at Island Park located on Ackerman Island in Wichita. Abe Goldstein, a famous clown, performed on the field and in the stands. The clowns did not provide all of the tricks as the Firemen's centerfielder patrolled the outfield on the back of a motorcycle driven by a policeman. A sellout crowd of 3,500 turned out to see the game.

Island Park burnt down in 1933 when a cigarette ignited the wooden structure. Without a venue to host his baseball games, Dumont petitioned the city of Wichita for a W.P.A. project to construct a new stadium. He presented an idea for a national, semi-professional baseball tournament to be held in Wichita. An idea that had not occurred to Dumont prior to the conversation. Lawrence Stadium was constructed prior to the 1934 baseball season. In 1978, Lawrence Stadium was renamed Lawrence-Dumont Stadium in honor of Dumont.

Dumont continued to use gimmicks to promote his baseball tournaments. Games were held early in the morning when graveyard shifts ended. An emphasis was put on "wumps", women umpires. One rule allowed the batter to run to either first or third base when the bases were unoccupied. Dumont had a microphone installed at home plate. When activated the microphone would rise up from the ground, allowing arguments at the plate to be broadcast to the whole stadium. To keep games moving at a rapid pace, he implemented an air device that could dust home plate. A timer with a buzzer was installed on the outfield wall. If either team took more than 90 seconds between innings or 20 seconds between pitches, a ball or strike was awarded to penalize the offender

In 1945, Dumont created a national uproar with a plan for a global tournament. Just five days after Japan surrendered in World War II, Dumont announced his plan for a September tournament that would include an invitation to Japan. Dumont quickly withdrew the proposal and the tournament was not held. Five years later with the authorization of General Douglas MacArthur, the series was held in Tokyo and Osaka Japan.

Dumont died in his office on July 3, 1971 while preparing for the 1971 National Baseball Congress World Series. His wife, Anne Dumont, retained ownership of the National Baseball Congress with Larry Davis leading the organization.

=== National Baseball Congress ===
The National Baseball Congress is best known for promoting amateur baseball games, but their reach extended beyond the games. The National Baseball Congress printed an Official Baseball Annual that included two hundred pages of rules and records. A pocket size version of baseball rules was also printed. Certification was provided for umpires, scorers and leagues through the National Baseball Congress. Player contracts were tracked via a national system to prevent "team jumping". The organization also sold trophies, medals, baseballs, umpire equipment and even insurance.

Wichita businessman Dee Hubbard purchased the National Baseball Congress in 1972, following the death of Hap Dumont. The organization was renamed National Baseball Congress of America.

==== State Tournaments ====
In 1931, Dumont established the Kansas Invitation Baseball Tournament to determine a semi-pro champion in the state of Kansas. Thirty-two teams were invited to the inaugural event, a single elimination tournament held at Island Park in Wichita. Abilene won the first Kansas tournament.

Additional state tournaments were organized in the following years, eventually including all fifty states. When the national tournament, NBC World Series, was established in 1935 the state tournament champions qualified for the national tournament.

The state tournaments eventually became qualifying tournaments to regional tournaments, rather than the national tournament. Regional tournament champions qualified for the national tournament.

==== Global Tournaments ====
With district, state, regional and a national tournament in place, Dumont set out to establish a non-professional global tournament. He started in 1939, with a seven-game series between the NBC World Series champion representing the United States and the Puerto Rico national champion from Guayama. In 1948, a Can-Am Series with Canada was billed as the Sandlot Baseball World Series. 1950 and 1952 matched the NBC World Series champion against Japan in the Inter-Hemisphere Series.

International Series

Year	United States	Opponent	Location	Result
1952	Fort Myer, Virginia Colonials	Japan, Osaka All-Kanebo	Korakuen Stadium (3) and Osaka, Japan (2)	Fort Myer in 5 Games
1950	Fort Wayne, Indiana General Electrics	Japan, Osaka All-Kanebo	Korakuen Stadium (3) and Osaka, Japan (2)	Fort Wayne in 5 Games
1949	Fort Wayne, Indiana Kekiongas	Canada, Kitchener, Ontario Legionnaires	Fort Wayne, Indiana	Fort Wayne in 6 Games. Spring 1950.
1948	Fort Wayne, Indiana General Electrics	Canada, London Majors	Labatt Park	London in 7 Games
1940	Enid, Oklahoma Champlins	Puerto Rico, Guayama Brujos	Sixto Escobar Stadium	Enid in 7 Games
1939	Duncan, Oklahoma Halliburtons	Puerto Rico, Guayama Brujos	Sixto Escobar Stadium	Guayama in 7 Games

In 1955, a non-professional Global Series was organized. Teams representing Canada, Columbia, Hawaii (a U.S. Territory until 1959), Holland, Japan, Mexico, Puerto Rico and Spain played in the eight team tournament. The NBC World Series champion represented the United States. The Global Series only lasted three seasons.

Global Series 1955–1957

Year	Champion	Runner-Up	Location
1957	Japan, Kumagai Gumi	Canada, Edmonton Eskimos	Briggs Stadium
1956	United States, Fort Wayne, Indiana Allen Dairy	Hawaii, Honolulu Red Sox	Milwaukee County Stadium
1955	United States, Wichita, Kansas Boeing Bombers	Hawaii, Honolulu Red Sox	Milwaukee County Stadium

== See also ==
- Amateur baseball in the United States
- Baseball awards#U.S. collegiate summer baseball
