= Hays Larks =

Collegiate summer league baseball team

The Hays Larks are a collegiate summer baseball team located in Hays, Kansas. The Larks evolved from Hays during the 1946 season. From 1869 to 1945, the team went by the name of The Hays Town Team and was sponsored by various organizations and businesses in Hays. The Larks won their first NBC championship in 2024, defeating the defending champions Hutchinson Monarchs 7-3.

The Larks were part of the Jayhawk Collegiate League conference and were league champions in 2001, 2002, 2003, 2005, and 2006. The Larks have finished as NBC national runner-up four times: in 1995 with their only two losses to Team USA, 2000, 2001, 2007, and 2016.

As of 2020 the Larks are playing in the Rocky Mountain Baseball League and won the league in 2020, their inaugural year joining.

The team is managed by Frank Leo who is a member of the Kansas Baseball Hall of Fame and the National Baseball Congress Hall of Fame.

== Former Hays Larks ==
- Mitch Webster
- Aaron Crow
- Nolan Reimold
- Jim Leyritz
- Lance Berkman
- Albert Pujols
- B. J. Ryan
- Jason Frasor
- Jack Wilson
- Mark Alexander
