= Heath Bell =

American baseball pitcher (born 1977)

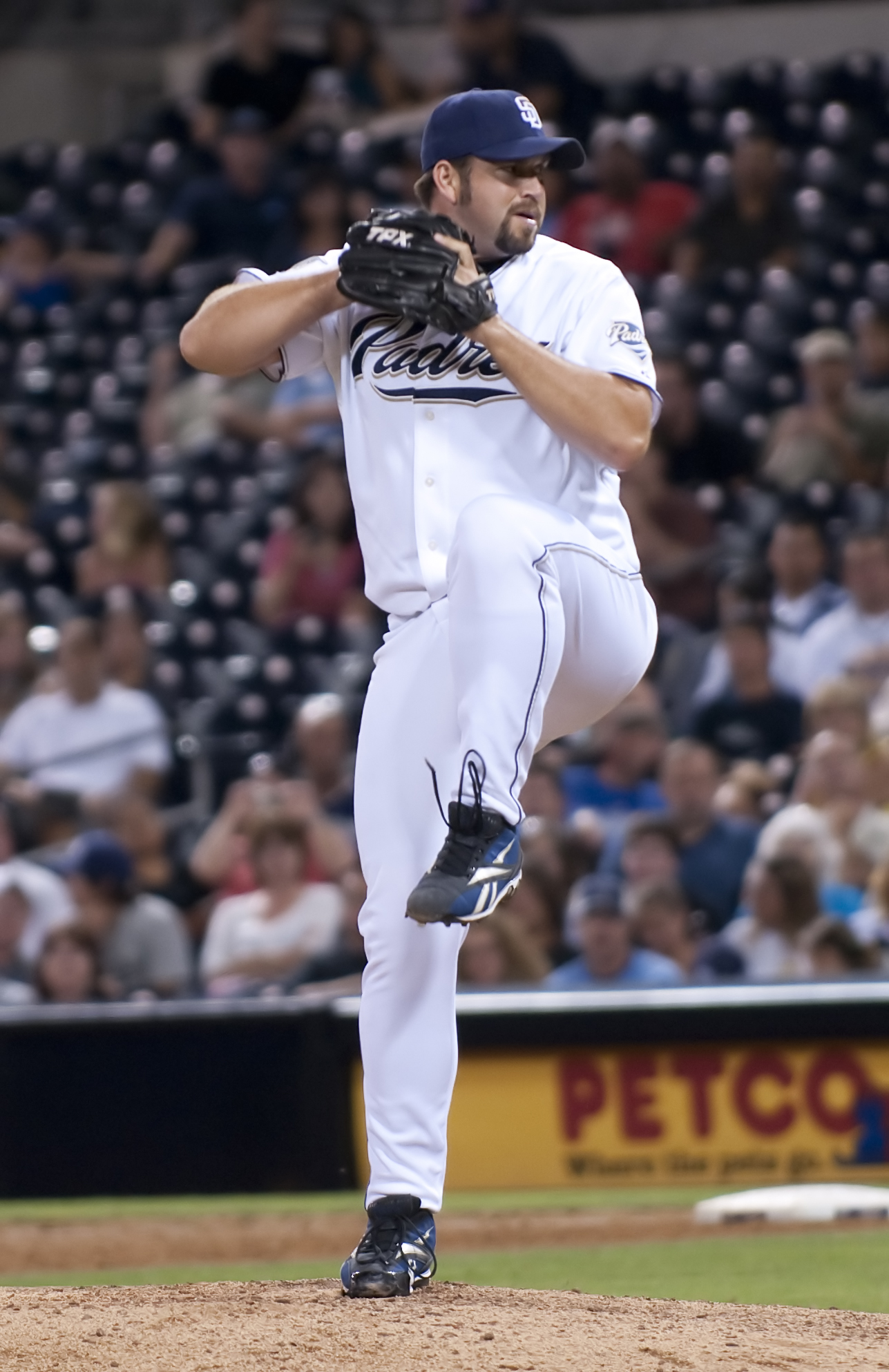
- Bell with the San Diego Padres in 2009
- Pitcher
- Born: September 29, 1977 (age 49); Oceanside, California, U.S.
- Batted: Right Threw: Right

MLB debut
- August 24, 2004, for the New York Mets

Last MLB appearance
- May 3, 2014, for the Tampa Bay Rays

MLB statistics
- Win–loss record: 38–32
- Earned run average: 3.49
- Strikeouts: 637
- Saves: 168
- Stats at Baseball Reference

Teams
- New York Mets (2004–2006); San Diego Padres (2007–2011); Miami Marlins (2012); Arizona Diamondbacks (2013); Tampa Bay Rays (2014)

Career highlights and awards
- 3× All-Star (2009–2011); 2× NL Rolaids Relief Man Award (2009, 2010); Delivery Man of the Year (2010); NL saves leader (2009)

Heath Justin Bell (born September 29, 1977) is an American former professional baseball relief pitcher. As a closer with the San Diego Padres from 2009 to 2011, Bell was a three-time All-Star and twice won the Rolaids Relief Man Award. He was also awarded the Delivery Man of the Year Award and The Sporting News Reliever of the Year Award.

Bell played multiple sports, including baseball, in high school. He moved on to community college, where he was an All-American. He began his professional career with the New York Mets, making his major league debut in 2004, and spending three seasons at both the minor and major league levels. In 2007, he was traded to San Diego, where he was a setup man before replacing Trevor Hoffman as the Padres' closer. From 2010 through 2011, Bell successfully converted 41 straight save opportunities, which tied Hoffman's team record. A free agent after the 2011 season, he signed with the Miami Marlins, and later played with the Arizona Diamondbacks and Tampa Bay Rays. He retired before the 2015 season.

== Early years ==
Bell was born in Oceanside, California to Jimmie, an automotive mechanic, and Edwina Bell. He attended Columbus Tustin Middle School and Tustin High School in Tustin, California, which is about 50 miles (80 km) from Oceanside. He lettered in football, basketball, and baseball.

Bell attended Santa Ana College where he was named a freshman All-American in 1997. In 1997, Bell made two appearances in the National Baseball Congress World Series while playing for the summer league El Dorado Broncos. He did not give up any runs. In 2011, he was named the league's Graduate of the Year. He was selected by the Tampa Bay Devil Rays in the 69th round of the 1997 amateur draft but did not sign with the team.

== Professional career ==
=== New York Mets ===
Bell did not begin his professional career until 1998, when he signed with the New York Mets as an undrafted free agent. He made his major league debut on August 24, 2004, pitching two scoreless innings with three strikeouts against the San Diego Padres. The righty spent the next two seasons shuttling between the Mets and their Triple-A affiliate Norfolk. Bell said coaches in the Mets' minor leagues told him his best opportunity to succeed was to leave the organization as other people did not believe in him.

=== San Diego Padres ===
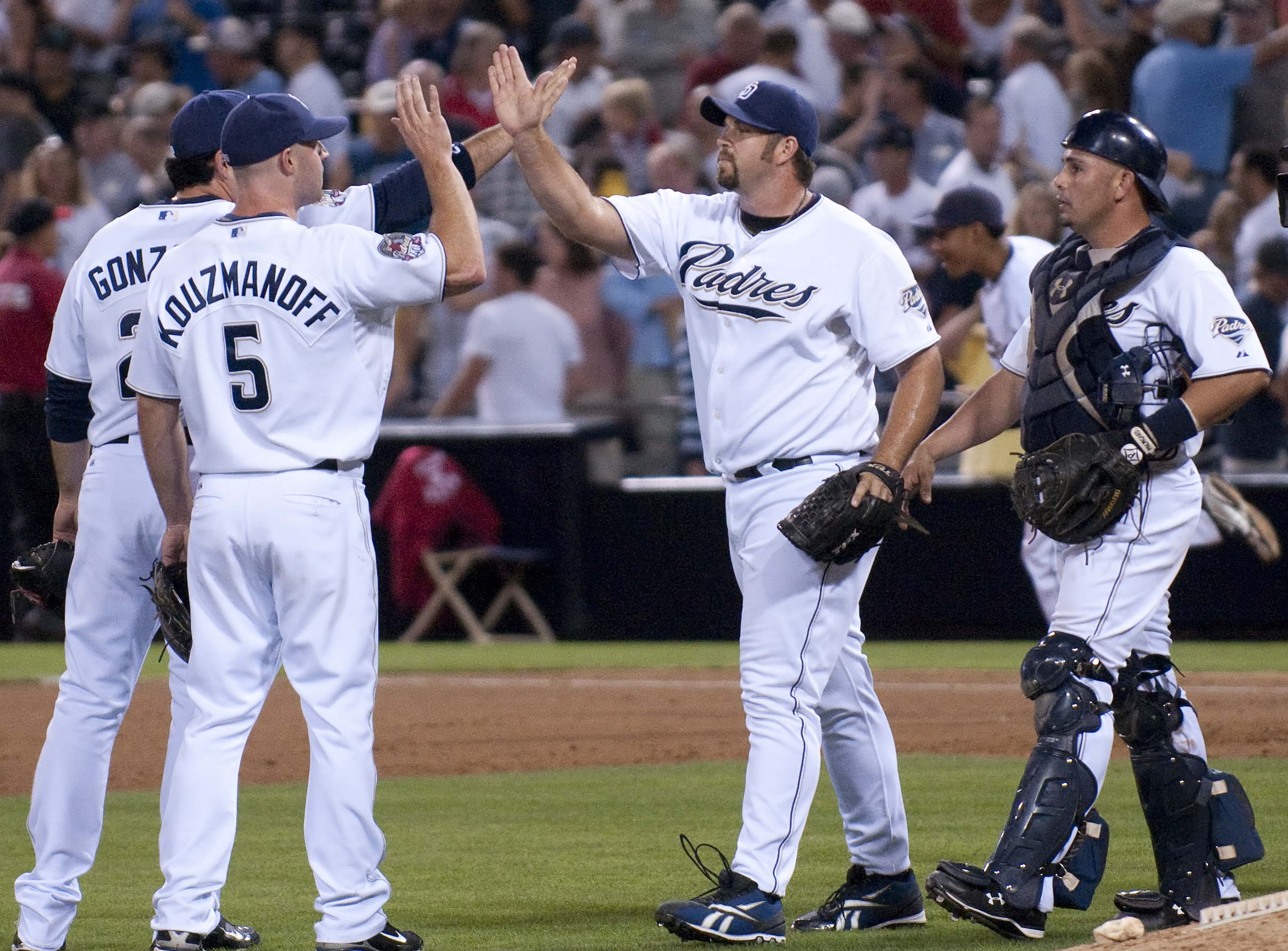
Bell congratulated after a save in 2009

On November 15, 2006, Bell was traded to San Diego, along with pitcher Royce Ring, for outfielder Ben Johnson and relief pitcher Jon Adkins. He was part of the Padres bullpen, where he replaced Scott Linebrink as the 8th inning setup man before Trevor Hoffman closed games. In 2009, Hoffman signed with the Milwaukee Brewers and Bell was promoted to closer. Bell sprinted from the bullpen and into a save situation accompanied by the song "Blow Me Away" by Breaking Benjamin. Bell's save situations are referred to by fans as "Bell's Hell", a play on Hoffman's famous "Hells Bells".

In 2009, Bell received the Delivery Man of the Month Award in April after converting all eight of his save opportunities in 8 2/3 scoreless innings of work while striking out nine batters. He was named to the National League (NL) All-Star Team on July 5. He, along with teammate Adrián González, represented the Padres at the 2009 MLB All-Star Game in St. Louis on July 14. Bell came on in the 8th inning and gave up a triple to Curtis Granderson followed by a sacrifice fly to Adam Jones to make the score 4–3 in the American League's favor; Bell was the losing pitcher in the game. Bell ended the 2009 season leading the National League in saves with 42 in his first year as a full-time closer. He won the NL Rolaids Relief Man Award

In 2010, Bell was named to his second consecutive NL All-Star team in July. Starting May 29, he converted 34 consecutive saves to end the season, the longest streak by a Padres since Hoffman. Bell collected saves on a season-high four consecutive days from August 10–13. For the year, Bell had a career-high 47 saves, which ranked second in MLB and was second in team history behind Hoffman's 53 in 1998. Bell's .940 save percentage (47 of 50) led all of MLB. He did not allow any of his nine inherited runners to score, and he had six saves of more than one inning pitched. Bell won the Delivery Man of the Year Award, The Sporting News NL Reliever of the Year Award, and the NL Rolaids Relief Man Award.

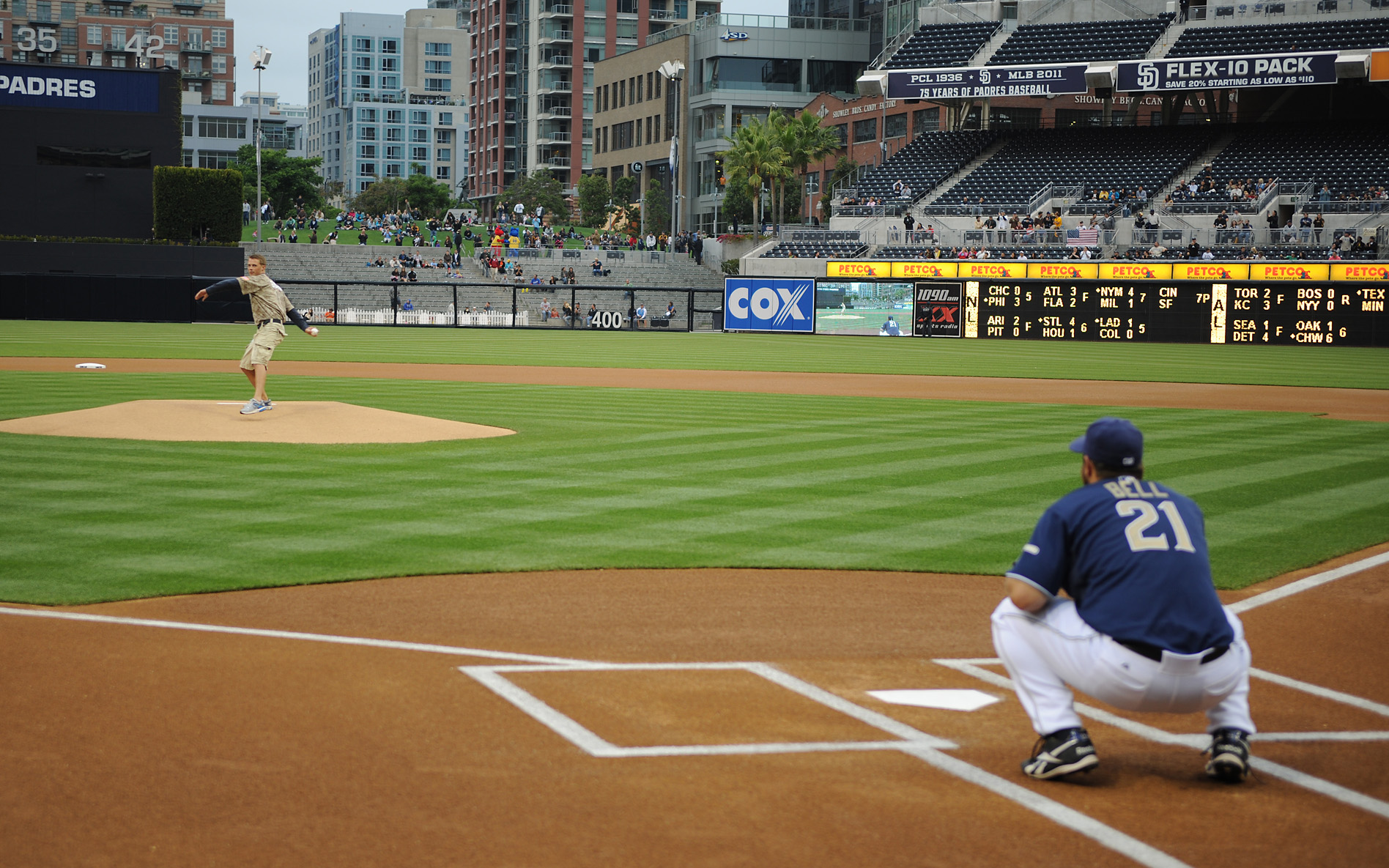
Bell catching ceremonial first pitch in 2011

Bell was the highest paid Padres player in 2011 at $7.5 million salary and would be eligible for free agency at the end of the season. He converted his first seven save opportunities of 2011, which tied him with Hoffman for the Padres club record of 41 consecutive successful save conversions. The streak also tied him with Hoffman and Rod Beck for the then-fourth longest in MLB history. Bell blew his next save opportunity, a 3–0 lead, after he opened the ninth inning walking the first two batters, and third baseman Chase Headley made a two-out, two-run throwing error to tie the game. On May 14, Bell recorded his 100th career save in a 9–7 win over the Colorado Rockies. Bell was selected to his third consecutive All-Star game. Entering the game in the eight inning, Bell sprinted from the bullpen and did a slide in front of the pitcher's mound, taking out a chunk of the infield grass and leaving grass stains on his pants. "I wanted the fans to have fun with this", said Bell. With the team 12 games under .500 coming out of the All-Star break, general manager Jed Hoyer said the Padres would pursue a long-term contract with Bell if they did not get a desirable trade offer for him. Ultimately Bell was not traded at the non-waiver trade deadline on July 31, but Hoyer admitted Bell's greatest value to the team might come as a free agent if Bell refuses salary arbitration and signs elsewhere—the Padres would receive two first-round draft picks in June 2012 as compensation. Bell said he planned to accept arbitration from the Padres if they did not agree on a multi-year deal. He finished the season 43 of 48 in save opportunities with a 2.44 ERA, but he struck out less than 30 percent of all opponents’ at-bats for the first time as a Padre.

Bell wanted a three-year contract from the Padres, who instead offered two years with an option for 2014. Talks stalled after Hoyer left the Padres and was replaced by Josh Byrnes as general manager. The Padres offered arbitration, but Bell backed away from his earlier intention to accept arbitration. The Miami Marlins, the Toronto Blue Jays, Boston Red Sox and Los Angeles Angels of Anaheim were also interested in signing him. Bell had a 27–19 record with a 2.53 earned run average and 134 saves in 354 appearances with the Padres over five seasons. His 132 saves in the last three seasons led the majors.

=== Miami Marlins ===
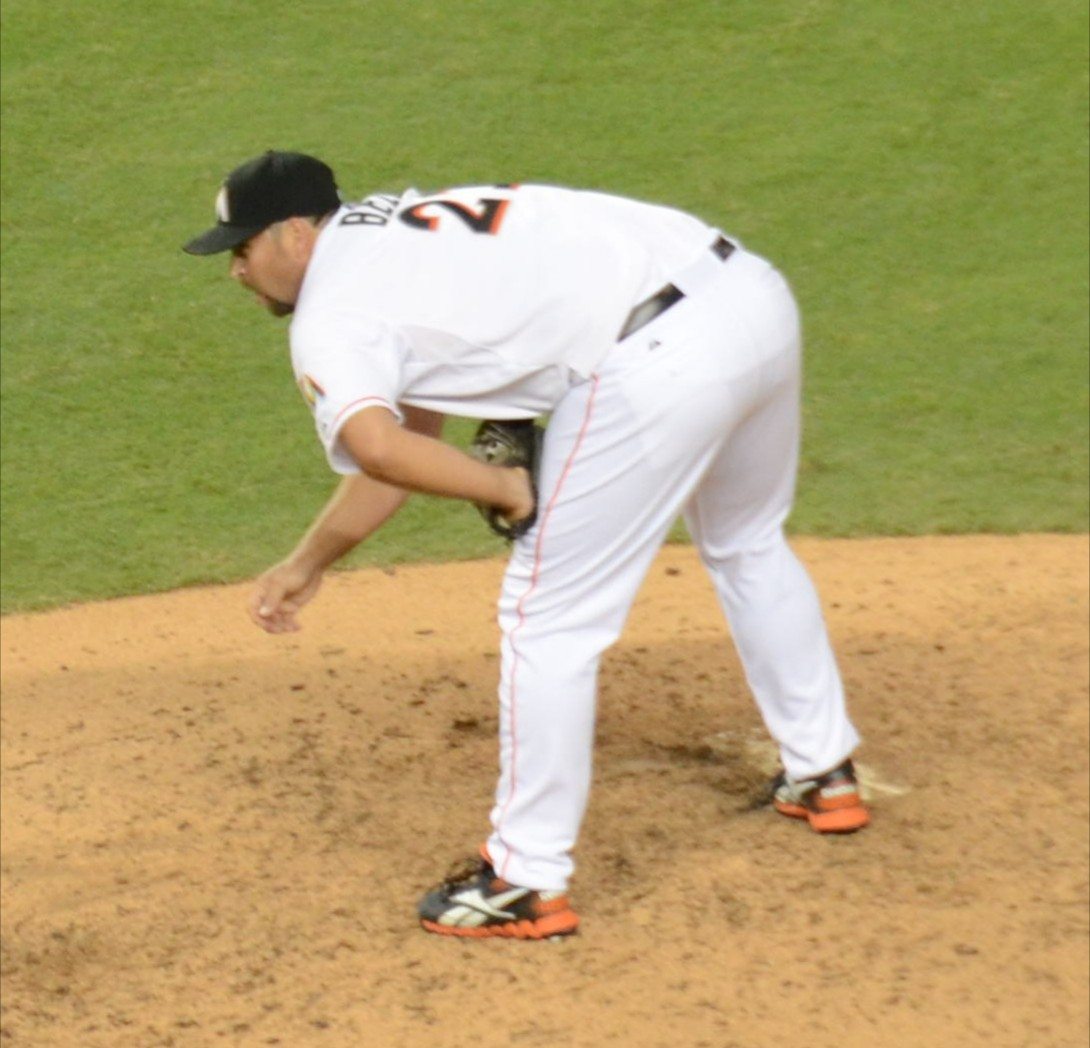
Bell pitching for the Miami Marlins in 2012

On December 5, 2011, Bell signed a three-year, $27 million contract with the Miami Marlins. He was temporarily demoted from the closer role in May after beginning the 2012 season blowing four of his first seven save opportunities with an 0–3 record and an 11.42 ERA in 11 games. Bell said he had been battling an undisclosed personal issue, and he felt "completely lost" in Miami being apart from his family.

On May 11, 2012, Marlins manager Ozzie Guillén placed Bell back to the closer role, and his ERA dropped below 10.00 later that month. He was again demoted after the All-Star break, when he was 2–5 with a 6.75 ERA and six blown saves in 25 opportunities, and Steve Cishek assumed the closer role. Late in the season, a rift between Bell and Guillen developed with each proclaiming waning respect for one another. Bell acknowledged his teammates likely lost respect for him after the incident. Bell had an 0.69 ERA over his last 13 appearances before blowing a 3–0 lead in the eighth inning in his last game of the year. He ended the season 4–5 with a 5.09 ERA and 19-for-27 in save chances.

=== Arizona Diamondbacks ===
On October 20, 2012, the Marlins traded Bell to the Arizona Diamondbacks in a three-team trade in which the Marlins acquired minor leaguer Yordy Cabrera. Arizona already had incumbent closer J. J. Putz. The Marlins agreed to pay $8 million of the remaining $21 million still owed Bell over the subsequent two years. He began the season as a middle reliever behind Putz and setup man David Hernandez. On May 8, Bell was promoted to closer after Putz was placed on the disabled list with a strained right elbow.

=== Tampa Bay Rays ===
On December 3, 2013, Bell was traded to the Tampa Bay Rays in a three-team deal also involving the Cincinnati Reds. He was designated for assignment on May 4, 2014, before being released on May 11. Bell had a 7.27 ERA in 13 appearances with the Rays.

=== Baltimore Orioles/New York Yankees ===
On May 16, 2014, Bell agreed to a minor league deal with the Baltimore Orioles. He appeared in just 10 games for the Triple-A Norfolk Tides before he opted out of his deal on June 8. A few days later, on June 13, he signed a minor league deal with the New York Yankees. On June 24, the Yankees released Bell just 11 days after signing him. He had a 7.50 ERA in six innings (over five games) for the Scranton/Wilkes-Barre RailRiders.

=== Retirement ===
On December 22, 2014, Bell signed a minor league contract with the Washington Nationals that included an invitation to major league spring training, however he was released on March 23. He announced his retirement from baseball the following day.

Bell holds the National League record for consecutive errorless games as a pitcher, 549, which he set while playing for multiple teams during 2004–2013.

In 628.2 innings over 590 appearances, Bell committed only one error in 124 total chances, recording a .992 fielding percentage, 33 points higher than the league average at his position.

== Scouting report ==
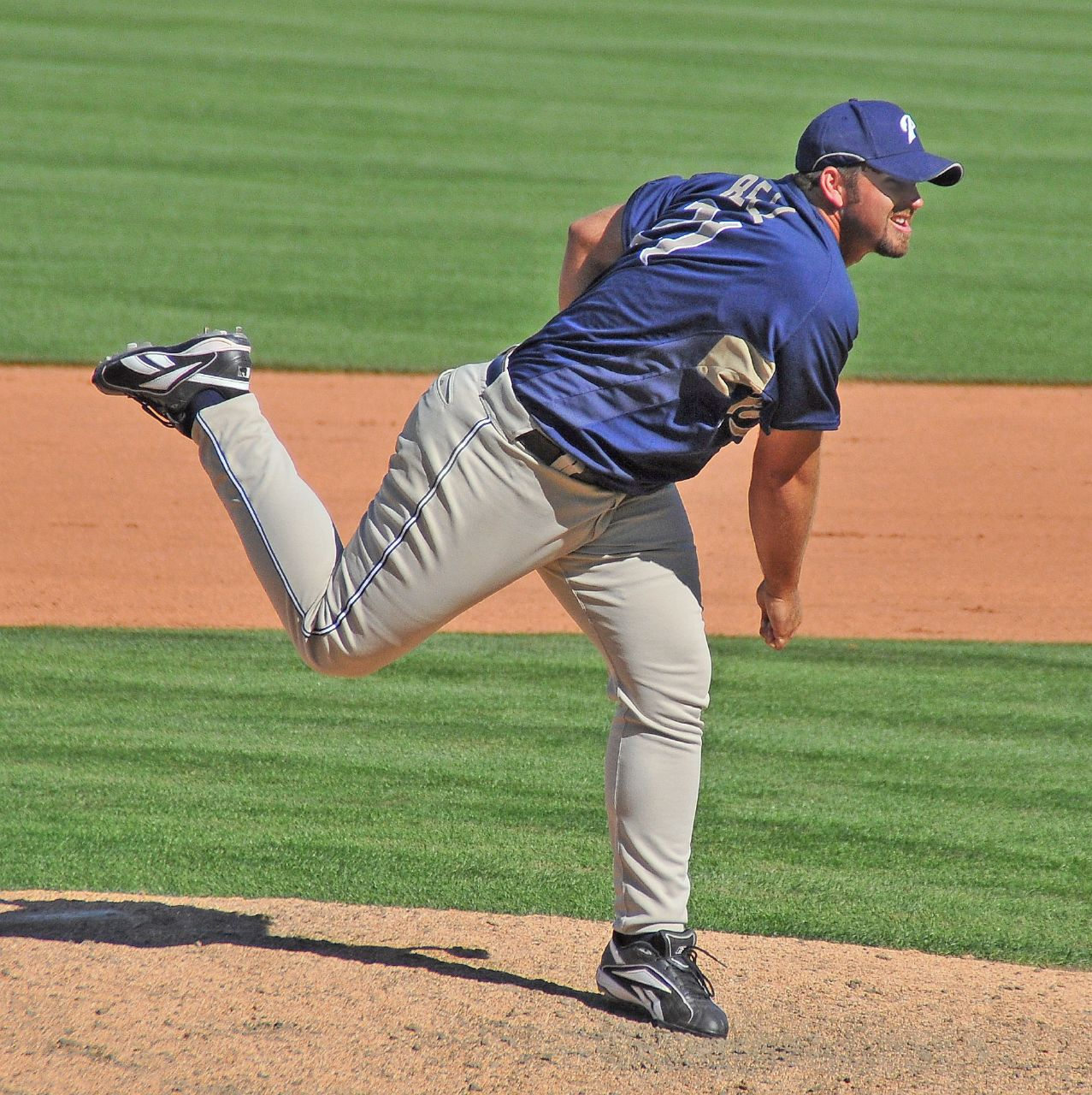

Generally a power pitcher, Bell averaged nearly a full strikeout per inning but also proved to be hittable in his 2005 sophomore season allowing 10.8 hits per nine innings and a very high 5.59 earned run average. Bell had a 94–98 mph fastball, usually sitting between 95 and 96. He also had an 11–5 curveball in the low 80s. Keith Law of ESPN wrote in 2011 that Bell had a straight fastball and pitches in the upper half of the zone, and benefited from pitching in the spacious Petco Park as a Padre.

== Personal life ==
Bell is married to Nicole Bell and they have four children. In 2009 article by USA Today, Bell revealed one of their children has Down syndrome, whom he called their "blessing in disguise." The family resides in Poway, California. He is the cousin of actor and singer-songwriter Drake Bell and former basketball player Erik Meek.

Bell joined the Hope For Leadership Foundation, a Christian-based movement that promotes sports and civic programs for inner-city kids.

== See also ==
- List of Major League Baseball annual saves leaders
