= Lewis & Clark Baseball League =

St. Louis, Missouri collegiate summer baseball league

- Sport: Baseball
- Inaugural Season: 2013 Final year 2016
- Motto: Find Your Way
- Headquarters: St. Louis, Missouri
- Title Sponsor: ProNine Sports
- Number of Teams: 12
- Duration: June - August
- Number of Games: 36 (Regular Season)
- Current Champion: Lemay Governors
- Founder/president: Nicholas Mahrt
- Commissioner: Jared Richardson
- Official Site: lcbl.org

The Lewis & Clark Baseball League, or LCBL, was a collegiate summer baseball league comprising teams of the top college players from the St. Louis, Missouri metropolitan area and beyond. Founded by Nicholas R. A. Mahrt in 2013, the amateur baseball league ran annually from June through early August. It was a non-profit organization and a charter member of the Commonwealth Leagues United — a nationwide collection of baseball leagues that emphasize student-athlete summer work/study opportunities. Players were not paid, so as to maintain their college eligibility and amateur status; their ages ranged from 18 to 23. The league folded prior to the 2017 season.

== About the league ==
Players chose to exclusively compete during the week or on the weekends, breaking the teams into two conferences, the Lewis Conference and the Clark Conference, each consisting of six teams in two divisions. Teams were scheduled to play 36 games over an eight-week season, culminating in an early August playoff. The playoffs consisted of a best-of-three Corps of Discovery Cup Series, matching the two division winners in the Lewis Conference and the two in the Clark Conference. After the best of the weekend and weekday were crowned, the conference champions met in a one-game, winner-take-all title game. The current league champions, the winners of the 2014 Corps of Discovery Cup, are the Voyagers.

Miller Orthopedics served as the platinum sponsor for the Lewis and Clark Baseball League. There were opportunities for individuals to seek sponsors, internal positions with the LCBL (field and gameday operations), and part-time employment/internships with local companies. Players who played exclusively on the weekend (Lewis Conference) could maintain a 40-hour per week schedule and still play in all of their team's games.

Player registration annually opened in November of the previous year, which began the official recruitment period, where student-athletes could commit to playing with a particular LCBL team. The league grew from an initial four teams to eight, and reached its peak expansion of 14 teams in 2016.

== Origin ==
In the summer of 2012, Nicholas Mahrt, then-assistant coach for Washington University in St. Louis, coached in the St. Louis Metro League. His participation with that particular organization left him dissatisfied with the local product that was being offered. Mahrt noticed the Metro League model lacked an opportunity for college players to pursue both aspects of their college experience. Due to a schedule that was loaded with games on weekdays and weekends, student-athletes in other leagues were ultimately forced to choose between baseball and a summer job/internship. By playing in summer leagues, young adults would thereby forgo a chance to enhance their post-collegiate careers by gaining professional experience. At the same time, declining an invitation in order to gain knowledge and collect a summer paycheck meant college players had to forgo sharpening their baseball skills.

With that mindset, Mahrt set out to create a new product, to address a need for balance between sports league and continuing education:

"College coaches entrust that, come Fall, we will return a better baseball player to their campus. They fear their players will develop rust if the summer is spent away from the game; not truly thinking about the student-athlete's best interest. Players need a league where they will use their summer getting better on the field, but also get better focused on what their coursework will lead to, upon graduation. If baseball is complemented by a taste of professional work experience, the player, the player's family, and the entire school — not just the baseball program — will be satisfied by who emerges from that summer league." - Nick Mahrt

For Mahrt, the level of talent that the Metro League attracts only widened the work/play disconnect. For nearly all league players, the finality of their senior year was also the end of their competitive playing days. Since a negligible percentage of student-athletes make a future living off playing baseball, most need their last collegiate summer months to build a resume. Mahrt never advocated that 20-year-olds "give up" baseball in lieu of work experience. In fact, he firmly stated that the summer should be used as an instructional period for all to reach their sports pinnacle. His new league simply sought a way to provide better balance to each player's offseason schedule.

The result was a brainstorming session about the creation of a new league. Mahrt and fellow Wash. U. assistant coach W. Ross Clites threw out ideas for a league that would operate as two separate entities. One "conference" would play its games strictly on Friday evenings, Saturdays and Sundays. This would present players with an opportunity to commute to St. Louis, if need be, while maintaining the prototypical Monday through Friday (40-hour per week) job. Players could even take summer college courses wherever they call home.

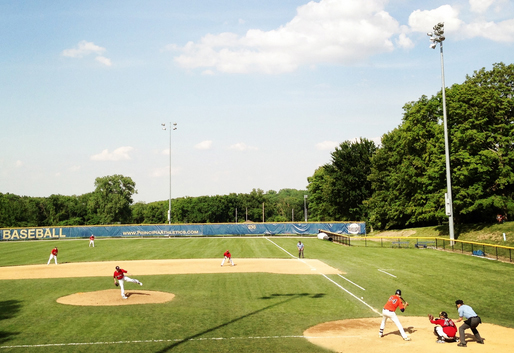
Weekend game action between the Explorers and Pathfinders at Principia College in July 2013

Clites, who also worked as a golf operations manager at a local course, with peak business demand on the weekends, suggested there were ample local companies that also required full-time Friday through Sunday staffing. Creating a "conference" that operates solely on weekdays still gives players a chance to take part-time seasonal jobs with weekend-based hours. This "conference" also doubles as the place for student-athletes to play if they have no desire to work or intern in the summer. Though not encouraged, if they simply come to the league to become a better baseball player, the weekday is for them.

Simply freeing the schedule for players to pursue employment was not enough. Mahrt did not want potential recruits to have to "go it alone." With a wide range of local business contacts in tow, the league actively pairs players with suitable employers. League officers spend as much time and energy placing student-athletes with companies — matching each individual's area of study — as they do placing them on teams. The LCBL's competitive advantage over other leagues is its network of companies, the Find Your Way Program. In its first year of existence, over 20 companies from the local St. Louis area had players from the LCBL either interning, job shadowing, fast-tracked for interviews, or otherwise employed. The league also employs several sports management, marketing, broadcasting, and journalism majors as player-interns for gameday operations.

== Branding ==
The two-silhouette logo of Meriwether Lewis and William Clark was inspired by a highway sign. Mahrt was driving to a Metro League game in 2012 when he took special notice of the imagery used to demarcate the Lewis and Clark National Historic Trail. It is something he had seen countless times, as the signs appear every five miles along the Missouri River. The trail's triangular logo evolved into the circular centerpiece in the Lewis & Clark Baseball League's primary wordmark.

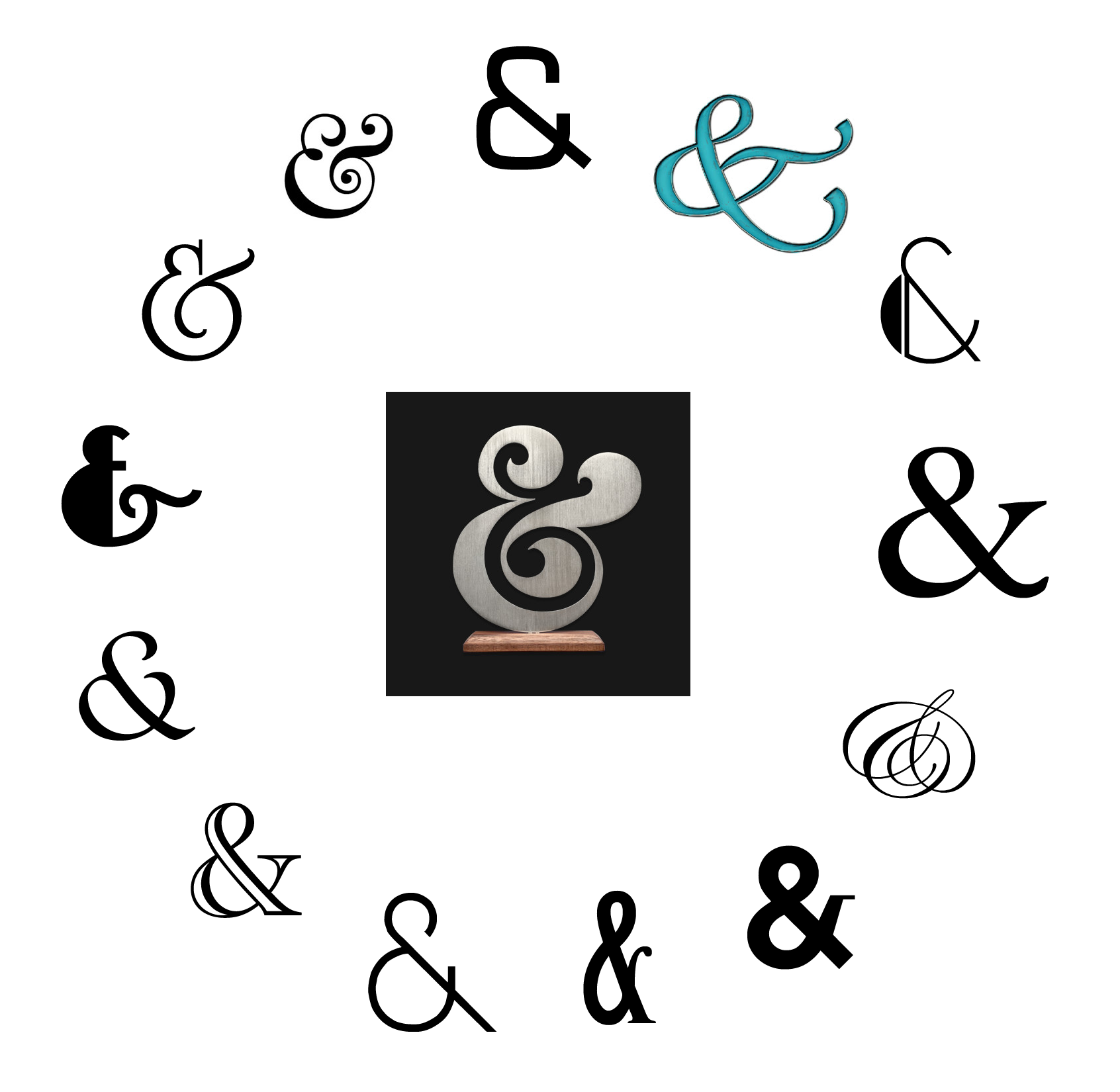
Inspiration board of potential ampersand logos

Mahrt desired a name that paid homage to the rich history that surrounds St. Louis. But with a lofty ambition to draw talent from coast-to-coast, the moniker also needed to carry national recognition. Too locally responsive and it would not be approachable or understood by college players back east or out west. The journey of the Lewis and Clark Expedition to explore the newly acquired Louisiana Purchase territory between 1804 and 1806, which started near St. Louis and traveled to the Pacific Ocean and back, perfectly encapsulated that aspired versatility.

The ampersand that commonly links Lewis to Clark has become the league's iconic shorthand logo, with an epsilon version prominently displayed on the front of every team's hat. The league chose to showcase one unifying logo — in this case, a punctuation mark — instead of unique, team-specific fonts or graphics. The colors differentiate each team from all others. For this reason, the "Amp[ersand] League" was another colloquial nickname for the LCBL.

== Philosophy ==
The LCBL was a unique summer collegiate league for many reasons, most notably for the option players had to use bats made of wood or metal. Since Major League Baseball and Minor League Baseball solely use wood bats, nearly all other top-tier summer leagues exclusively use wood. Even with new BBCOR standards to reduce batted ball exit speed, using the technology of composite bats is perceived to inflate offensive power and thus misrepresent statistics to pro scouts. Thus, Major League Baseball only sponsors, and partially funds, wood-bat leagues. They do so as a common denominator metric to judge, compare, and project the value of both hitters and pitchers to the professional game.

Due to subtle differences in length-to-weight ratios, and the discernible feeling at contact, the potential exists for a difficult transition period from metal (college) to wood (pro). To avoid this steep learning curve, more and more collegiate athletes use the summer as acclimation time with the tools of their future trade. The unapologetic objective of premier leagues is to prepare their amateur players for the Major League First-Year Player Draft, using the summer as a professional proving ground. MLB seizes the logistical opportunity to get talent, professional-caliber equipment, and franchise representatives all in one place. The LCBL believed that such models compromised the spirit of the league's competitive nature, with each game acting too much like an audition or stepping stone.

Professional baseball is not on the horizon for every college player in need of a summer league, however. This is not to say that the LCBL has no desire to get players drafted. The commissioner's office simply understands its rarity. Making everyone swing wood bats just to accommodate the 9.7% that will play baseball at the next level was seen as painting with a broad stroke. For a player who rationally understands that he has hit his ceiling — that upon the completion of his senior year he will never play competitive baseball again — it makes all the sense in the world for him to swing a bat with collegiate specifications. Forcing such a player to limit their power and spend a summer using tools they will not operate back on campus is misguided. It can lead to a bigger re-adjustment period than not playing any offseason baseball at all.

The Lewis & Clark Baseball League aimed to be on par with any rival wood-bat league, with a bigger focus on team success and without the MLB sponsorship. The "Find Your Way" motto encouraged each individual to shape the league to fit their unique situation. Some players stubbornly see it as the ground floor for an unheralded pro career, and swing wood. Others tinker their swings, with the familiarity of metal, in an attempt to be the best collegiate player possible. There is no shame, or stigma, in either bat selection. Furthermore, success with composite materials stand as good of a chance to get professional attention. Those were the core beliefs of the Lewis & Clark Baseball League's Barrel Up Initiative, encouraging players to swing what is comfortable to them.

The league is not blind to the fact that young adults get excited to be seen by pro scouts. For this reason, the LCBL is in the preliminary talks with members of the St. Louis Cardinals front office, in hopes they might expand their presence in 2014. All these factors harken back to the decision to name the league after Meriwether Lewis and William Clark. Their historical journey through the unknown epitomized the primary objective of the LCBL. For a college kid, post-baseball life is the great unknown. The league is tailored to the NCAA tagline: "There are over 380,000 student-athletes, and most of us go pro in something other than sports." With ample internship opportunities — to use their time in St. Louis as a networking, personal marketing, and resume-building experience — players leave the summer having found their way in more than just baseball wins and losses.

== Teams ==
At its peak, there were 12 teams in the Lewis & Clark Baseball League, up from four in the inaugural season. The league underwent an expansion to 12 teams in 2015. Teams were divided between two conferences — Clark (weekdays) and Lewis (weekends) — and evenly dispersed into four divisions. The divisions were named for the four major waterways in the St. Louis area: the Mississippi River, Missouri River, Meramec River, and River Des Peres.

One of the teams in particular subtly honors the accomplishments of the less-heralded William Clark, whose role in the Lewis and Clark Expedition had always taken a historical backseat to that of Captain Meriwether Lewis. However, in 2001, president Bill Clinton promoted Clark to the military rank of Captain of the Regular Army, posthumously placing Clark on equal standing with Lewis. Recognizing this important gesture, the LCBL had a team called the Captains, fittingly in the Clark Conference.

In the first two seasons, none of the teams carried a specific location identifier, since all were the product of the St. Louis metropolitan area. Contrary to the industry standard, the LCBL preferred to have the teams be known exclusively by their nicknames. In 2015, this changed in the Lewis Conference, as franchise ownership shifted from league-controlled to individual general management groups. For example, the Pioneers were branded as the Alton Pioneers, referencing the town in Illinois that the team called home.

=== Lewis Conference ===
Despite the goal of having both conferences up and running in 2013, the weekend league was the only one to take off in the inaugural season of the LCBL. Four teams played 28 games, exclusively on the weekends, in this first season. In a tongue-in-cheek tribute to Major League Baseball's National League, the Lewis Conference carries the nickname "Senior Circuit" for its longer existence, albeit only one year more than the Clark Conference.

In 2014, the "Founding Four" original Lewis & Clark Baseball League franchises realigned and set out to fill six teams. The Pioneers and Explorers returned to the Lewis Conference, where they were always meant to play. With the stalled launch of weekday play, the two spent the 2013 season in the Clark Conference to maintain the Lewis & Clark motif.

However, the Lewis Conference was only able to secure one of their two expansion teams for 2014. The Governors played in the Lewis, but the Voyagers were needed in the Clark to restore competitive balance. The two met in the 2014 Corps of Discovery Cup Championship. According to preseason plans, these teams would have never matched up in an inter-conference title game. The Voyagers followed the same script as the Explorers the year before: play in the Clark Conference (on a one-year conditional basis), win the league championship, then switch conferences the very next season. One month after winning the Cup, the Voyagers officially became the sixth member of the Lewis Conference.

With two more expansion teams in 2015, the Lewis Conference is now up to its final size: eight franchises. They are broken into two four-team divisions, the Des Peres and the Meramec, two lesser-known rivers in the area which both feed into the Mississippi-Missouri Watershed.

Teams in the Lewis Conference continued to play games exclusively on Friday evenings, Saturdays, and Sundays. During the course of an eight-week summer schedule, each team played every other Lewis Conference team on multiple occasions. Those in the same division squared off in three two-game series scattered throughout the season. In some instances, four of the games versus a common opponent could occur in the same weekend. Regardless, it amounted to six games, split evenly home and away, against the three divisional foes.

The remainder of the schedule was filled with games against the four teams in the other division. Lewis Conference teams never played regular-season games against Clark Conference opponents. Instead, they played four games each with all the inter-divisional opponents. The 18 divisional games, along with the 16 cross-division match-ups, gave each team a total of 34 regular-season games.

Name	Estd.	Manager	Assistant coach	Home Field	Colors
O'Fallon Travelers	2013	Jared Richardson	Nick Wymore	T.R. Hughes Ballpark	Dark Green, Scarlet
Alton Pioneers	2013	Paul Searles	n/a	Hopkins Field - G. Moore Park	Columbia Blue, Navy
Forest Park Pathfinders	2013	Geoff Oxley	n/a	Boeing Aviation Field	Orange, Navy
Lemay Governors	2014	Ryan Suttenfield	Jordan Bodenbach	Lutheran South H.S. Field	Cardinal, Royal, Navy
St. Louis Gamers	2015	Dave Pregon	n/a	Parkway Central H.S. Field	Royal Blue, Light Gray
St. Louis Pirates	2016	Phil Bernedson	n/a	n/a	Scarlet, Black

=== Clark Conference ===
Name	Estd.	Manager	Assistant coach	Home Field	Colors
West County Explorers	2013	Julius McDougal	n/a	Heine Meine Field	Scarlet, Black, Charcoal
St. Charles Captains	2014	Cameron Jergens	n/a	Lou Brock Field - Lindenwood U.	Navy, Athletic Gold
Belleville Lookouts	2014	Casey Leister	n/a	SWIC Field - Southwestern Ill. Coll.	Maroon, Scarlet
Dutchtown Diplomats	2014	Jeffrey Schuurmans	n/a	Divis Field - St. Mary's H.S.	Cardinal, Royal
Elsah Voyagers	2014	Yoonjae Nam	Scott Ross	Principia College Field	Burnt Orange, Light Gray
Imperial River Men	2016	Christopher Joyce	n/a	Seckman H.S. Field	Columbia Blue, Scarlet

Teams in the Clark Conference were the relative newcomers to the LCBL, not starting play (exclusively on weekdays) until 2014. The conference did exist in 2013, but in name only. The label was simply used to differentiate between the original four teams, splitting the league in half solely for All-Star and playoff purposes. The Pioneers and Explorers played one conditional season in the Clark, with the Explorers incongruously capturing the Discovery Cup Championship for the conference before it even launched. The official unveiling of the Clark Conference came a month later.

The first season of play was slated to introduce the Lookouts, Navigators, Captains, and Diplomats. When the Navigators announced they would need another year to become operational, the Voyagers, a 2014 expansion team meant for the Lewis Conference, moved over to fill the void. In 2015, one final realignment returned all the teams to their originally intended locations. The Voyagers went back to the Lewis Conference, taking with them yet another league title. Thus the first two LCBL Champions resided in the Lewis Conference but won the Cup while members of the Clark Conference.

With some temporary modifications, the franchise model that Mahrt and Clites envisioned had been adhered to enough to proceed. The plan for each conference was for four teams in year one, six in year two, and eight by year three. By that third-year checkpoint, the goal was to transfer majority ownership of each team to groups/individuals. With a "head start" the Lewis Conference reached its eight teams in the first three seasons. Even though only three Clark franchises had players on the field in 2014, the LCBL business model pushed forward as if all four did. The four were joined by two new teams, in accordance to the expansion timeline. They are broken into two three-team divisions, the Mississippi and the Missouri – the two area rivers with a national reach.

== Players ==
The talent level of the players who participated in the LCBL was tailored to the student-athlete. The largest representation among the various levels of collegiate baseball is that of the NCAA Division III athlete. This is both the byproduct of ample baseball programs in the St. Louis area (evidenced by an entire conference bearing "St. Louis" in its moniker) and also part of the original mission of the commissioner. As D-III coaches, Mahrt and Clites looked to take care of their own underserved market sector first.

The LCBL had a wider eligibility range than typical summer baseball programs. Rosters from the Prospect League, for instance, are composed exclusively of freshmen, sophomore, and junior class players from four-year affiliated institutions. Additionally, no more than four members of the same institution are permitted to play on the same summer team. The mindset is to give opportunities to those with proven collegiate ability and at least one year remaining in their college baseball careers.

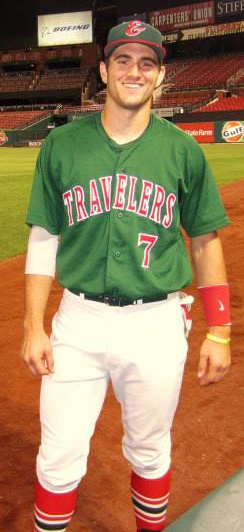
The first-generation LCBL uniform; jersey by Rawlings and hat by New Era (shown: Matt Tracy, Travelers)

The Lewis & Clark Baseball League aimed to follow this model, but the league was not MLB-funded nor NCAA-sanctioned, so it was able to grant generous exemptions. If a high school senior had a letter of acceptance into an accredited college or university, accompanied by a letter from the school's baseball coach confirming a mutual commitment, offered athletic scholarship(s), or general recruiting interest, the individual was permitted to play in the LCBL during the summer before his first collegiate semester.

Furthermore, the league also uniquely granted eligibility on the back-end of a college player's career. Academic seniors and graduate students were permitted to play one final summer of baseball so long as their graduation day, most recent college baseball season, and final LCBL season all occurred in the same calendar year. This meant that a player did not have to return to a college or university upon completion of the league schedule in August.

=== Recruiting ===
To ensure playing time, each team in the LCBL has a roster maximum of 23 players. These spots are specifically broken down position-by-position, with very little flexibility or deviation. Mahrt did not want a scenario where a college catcher joined a team that already had two. Thus each manager in the league was restricted to recruiting two catchers, three middle infielders, three corner infielders, five outfielders, seven (primary) pitchers, and one designated hitter. There was also a spot reserved for one additional recruit: a utility piece with flexibility of playing in any of the previous position groups, even if it otherwise exceeded the roster limitations (e.g. a fourth middle infielder).

All LCBL managers were encouraged to personally recruit as many players as possible based on the positional needs of the team. Since most managers were also college assistant coaches, the recruiting process typically began by filling the summer roster with student-athletes from their own conferences or schools with prior affiliations. The only restriction was that an NCAA coach cannot manage his own college player during the summer. To provide continuity, managers must (at the very least) offer any eligible players a chance to return to their previous teams. If the returning player commits, it counts as a recruit towards the manager's total. Players signed letters of commitment upon registration, stating that the manager made an offer and the player would forgo the draft process by accepting.

Should a player decline, either because he does not want to play for that same manager again or because he simply desires to play on a different team, he could opt out pending league approval. Returning players who declined an offer from their original team became restricted free agents and, if no other manager recruited them to switch teams, they entered a pool of draftable candidates. The one stipulation was that they could not be drafted by the team they left.

=== Gateway Players ===
Clites came up with a narrow-focus marketing plan that specifically targeted out-of-state college baseball players with St. Louis ties. Rather than cast a wide net into the national talent pool, he compiled a database of nearly 40 recent graduates from local high schools that traveled extensive distances to play college baseball. The approach was to grant referral discounts to these players (in schools over 150 miles away) who house college friends that commit to play in the league.

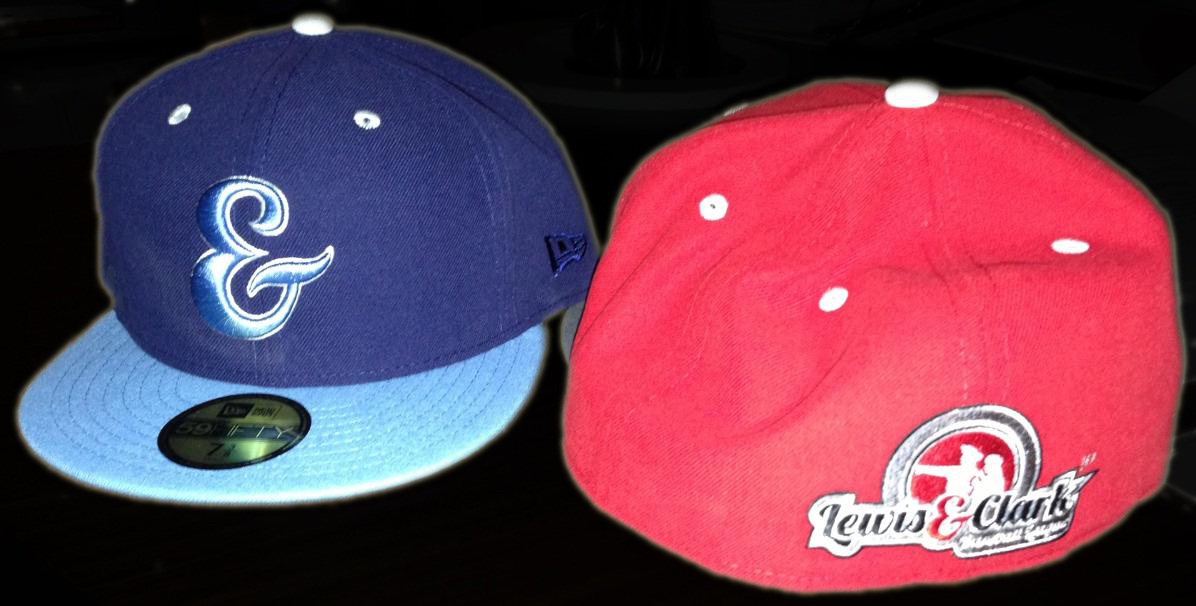
Front and back of LCBL hats, by New Era (shown: [left] Pioneers, [right] Explorers)

Clites recognized that these journeying players needed an incentive to come back to St. Louis for their summer months. If Mahrt and Clites could make the domestic product equal or better than anywhere else, people would willingly come back home. To achieve this standard of excellence, the LCBL put the quality of the league in the player's hands, enticing superior St. Louis-based talent to be their own promoters. If they come back home to play, and bring a skilled college teammate, it becomes a win-win for all. Clites coined them "Gateway Players" in a nod to the city's nickname and a play on the tell-a-friend marketing strategy. The vast majority of these players were former members of the St. Louis Gamers (a youth travel program where Clites and Mahrt both coached). Several were on scholarship at Division I schools, which only added to the credibility of the league.

The commissioner's office reviewed the applications for Gateway Players, verifying that the college teammate did not have prior St. Louis affiliations and no other options to stay in the city. Each applicant also had to agree to play in a minimum number of games in order to qualify. If the request was approved, one registration fee was refunded and the two college teammates operated as a package deal. Both were required to play on the same team, like brothers in a Little League program. If any manager wanted to claim one, they received the other, though it would cost the team two recruiting chips. If the Gateway Players went unsigned in the offseason, they would enter the draft and had to be selected in back-to-back rounds.

=== Draft ===
One logistical issue with a mission to have separate weekday and weekend players is the need for both conferences to have their own tryout and draft process. Players that were not recruited or not claimed in free agency had to first select which days of the week they wanted to play. For 2014, the Lewis Conference required a minimum of 138 total players; 92 for the inaugural Clark Conference season. These roster spots came in a random assortment of positions, as each team would have different position limits already reached. Brandon Fairbanks served as the league's Director of Recruiting and was responsible for building the pool of unrecruited players. An open tryout was then held in mid-May.

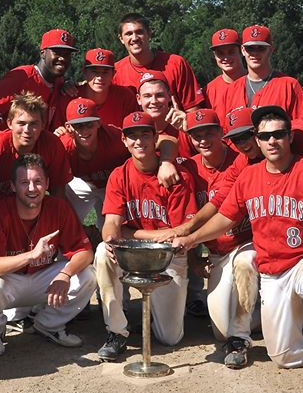
2013 Explorers celebrating their LCBL title

Even if a player had a limited window of participation, either late to arrive to St. Louis or early to return to his campus, signing a preseason commitment letter counted as recruitment. Each manager's first thirteen recruits operated as non-compensatory additions, meaning teams did not lose out on any draft picks to sign them. At the point of adding a fourteenth recruit, the coaching staff weighed the value of that recruit over a pick in the first round in the draft. The decision to sign a fifteenth player would also cost a team a second-round pick, and so on. If, for example, a team had 18 eligible returnees, and they all signed the mandated offer to come back, then the manager would not draft a player until the sixth round.

This measure ensured a league-wide competitive balance and player buy-in with their previous team. The new, unrecruited talent went to the weaker teams, while the championship-caliber teams, where all the players are eager to return, rolled out a nearly identical roster to defend their success. A team could conceivably draft only emergency reserve players. Should they return a majority of the roster and complement the rest with new recruits, the 23 full-time roster spots could be filled well before Opening Day.

After the conference-specific tryouts, the managers began the draft. Like most major sports leagues, the draft order was assembled by the previous season's standings in reverse. Any expansion teams jumped to the front of the line, having the first picks in each round. The draft commenced until every player was selected, even if teams exceeded their 23-player roster cap. Late-round draft picks (those that occupied roster spots 24 and beyond) were notified of their conditional team affiliation. Their registration fee was discounted while their contact information was kept for emergency roster situations, such as roster spots that might become vacant due to injuries, vacations, or because other players had to return to school in early August. Should they accept this reserve role, each player had to sign a league document stating they understood the possibility that they would not play all season.

=== Roster submission ===
LCBL managers were required to set and submit an active roster (with a maximum of 23 players) each week, operating like a fantasy sports league. Decisions pertaining to a player's active status were final until the next week's roster submission. Even if a Clark Conference player was set to miss only one day, should the manager place him on the inactive list, he would not be eligible to play any games during that week. If he was kept on the active roster, the team would play with 22 players during his one-game absence (unable to add a willing reserve mid-week).

Undrafted "rental" players were eligible to come in and out of the LCBL. Inevitably, a few young adults were late to hear of the LCBL, missed the draft, and/or could only play in a handful of games. With executive committee approval, and only with reserve status, they could still play. In other words, the original 23 players that were recruited or drafted had preferential treatment. If the full-time recruits and draftees were healthy and present, they had to be on the active roster. This policy provided competitive balance; no manager could arbitrarily dress a talented "rental" player who is in town for one week.

This was especially important in the postseason. A few LCBL players were dual-sport athletes who had to leave at playoff time for the start of college football practices. In order to qualify for these voided spots, undrafted "rental" players had to dress for 15% of their team's total games. Drafted reserves were able to play in the postseason without this restriction. Since all conference managers had a chance to evaluate (and draft) them before the start of the season, their diminished talents were known. Managers keep these players on-call for a reason; their opportunity to play might come during the team's most important games. Both types of reserves had to enter the roster while staying within the league's position-by-position limitations, filling a direct need at a particular place on the field.

=== College representation ===
Students at the following institutions have played for teams in the Lewis & Clark Baseball League:

NCAA Division I

- Southern Illinois University-Edwardsville
- Saint Louis University
- Southeast Missouri State University
- University of Illinois Urbana-Champaign
- Marshall University
- Arkansas State University
- University of Missouri
- Alabama A&M University
- University of Evansville
- Murray State University
- University of Pennsylvania
- University of Oklahoma
- Illinois State University
- Miami University
- Alcorn State University
- Southern Illinois University-Carbondale
- Missouri State University
- Indiana State University
- Wichita State University
- Lafayette College
- Yale University
- Belmont University
- Savannah State University
- Western Illinois University
- University of Central Arkansas
- Dallas Baptist University
- College of the Holy Cross
- James Madison University
- Duke University
- University of Richmond
- Stanford University
- Northwestern State University

NCAA Division II

- University of Missouri-St. Louis
- University of Central Missouri
- Drury University
- Lindenwood University
- Maryville University
- Eastern New Mexico University
- Coker College
- Truman State University
- Florida Institute of Technology
- Kentucky State University
- McKendree University
- Quincy University
- Hillsdale College
- Lincoln University
- Missouri University of Science & Technology
- University of Indianapolis
- University of Illinois Springfield
- Northwestern Oklahoma State University
- Wayne State University
- Harding University
- Azusa Pacific University
- Regis University
- Northwest Nazarene University
- William Jewell College
- Grand Valley State University
- Barry University
- Tuskegee University
- New Mexico Highlands University
- University of Sioux Falls
- University of Southern Indiana
- Southwest Baptist University
- University of Wisconsin-Parkside
- University of North Dakota
- Mississippi College
- Oklahoma Christian University
- Arkansas Tech University
- Northwest Missouri State University

NCAA Division III

- Washington University in St. Louis
- Greenville College
- Fontbonne University
- Webster University
- Westminster College
- Illinois College
- Principia College
- Central College
- DePauw University
- Iowa Wesleyan College
- Grinnell College
- Benedictine University
- Illinois Wesleyan University
- Baldwin Wallace University
- Millikin University
- Augustana University
- Lawrence University
- University of the Ozarks
- Eureka College
- Wartburg College
- MacMurray College
- Coe College
- Beloit College
- Hendrix College
- Knox College
- Rhodes College
- University of Chicago
- Spalding University
- Covenant College
- Gordon College
- Cornell College
- Rockford University
- Washington & Jefferson College
- Millsaps College
- Wheaton College
- Buena Vista University
- Case Western Reserve University
- Blackburn College
- Iowa Wesleyan College
- SUNY Canton
- Bethany Lutheran College
- University of Dallas

NAIA

- Central Methodist University
- William Woods University
- Missouri Baptist University
- Harris-Stowe State University
- Lindenwood University-Belleville
- Judson University
- St. Gregory's University
- Park University
- Brescia University
- Vanguard University
- Culver-Stockton College
- Dakota Wesleyan University
- Menlo College
- Faulkner University
- American Institute of Business
- Hannibal-LaGrange University
- Missouri Valley College
- Ottawa University
- York College
- Spring Hill College
- University of Pikeville
- Mount Marty College
- Texas Wesleyan University
- Baker University
- Williams Baptist College
- Northwestern College
- Avila University
- Texas A&M University-Texarkana

NJCAA - Div. I

- St. Charles Community College
- Southwestern Illinois College
- St. Louis Community College-Meramec
- Lake Land College
- Mineral Area College
- Jefferson College
- Wabash Valley College
- Three Rivers Community College
- Olney Central College
- North Central Missouri College
- Southeastern Illinois College
- Northeast Texas Community College
- Kaskaskia College
- San Jacinto College-North
- Coffeyville Community College
- Daytona State College
- Lincoln Trail College
- Florida State College at Jacksonville
- Northeast Texas Community College
- John A. Logan College
- Rend Lake College

NJCAA - Div. II

- Lewis and Clark Community College
- Parkland College
- Carl Sandburg College
- Black Hawk College
- John Wood Community College
- Illinois Central College
- Southeastern Community College
- Danville Area Community College
- McHenry County College
- Elgin Community College
- Wentworth Military College

In addition to this list, Chabot College sent players to participate in the Lewis & Clark Baseball League but is not a member of any of the associations shown above. In California, junior colleges have their own governing body — the California Community College Athletic Association (CCCAA).

== Managers and coaches ==
For Mahrt, the league was as much about the managers and coaches as the players themselves. The common denominator was the pursuit of future employment: the players could obtain it while participating in the league, and the managers could obtain it by participating in the league. The LCBL is a resume-building experience for young talent in the ranks of collegiate assistant coaches.

Mahrt uses resources like the American Baseball Coaches Association to take chances on unknown volunteer assistants, to get them hooked on coaching as a feasible career path. While other leagues maintain veteran coaches for decades, the LCBL was known for continuously turning over a new crop of talent. College assistant coaches came from as far away as Colorado and Florida to be a part of the LCBL coaching ranks.

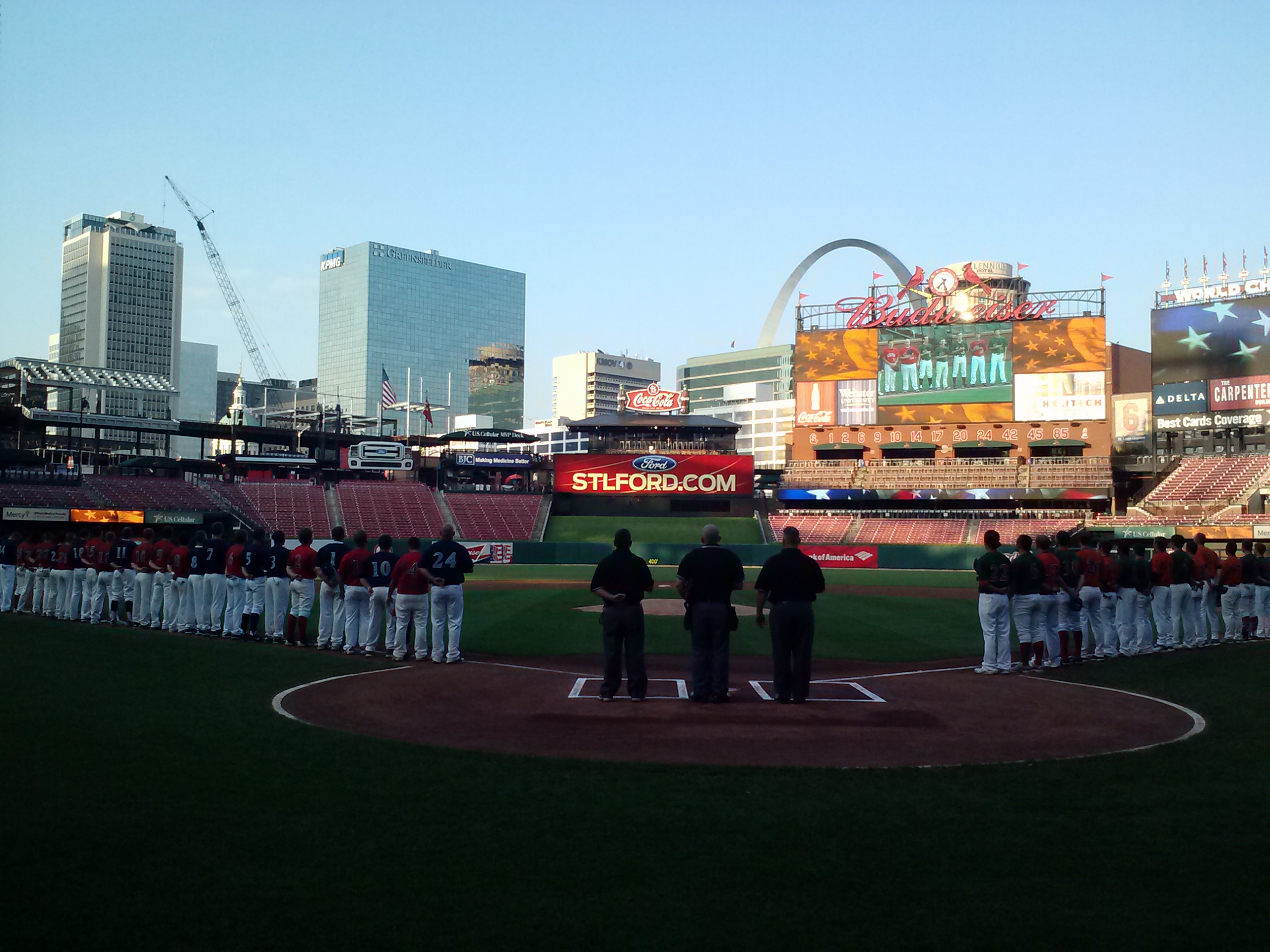
Team introductions and the playing of The Star-Spangled Banner at the 2013 LCBL All-Star Game

A few St. Louis-based college assistants offered their employers' fields as LCBL host sites. The many facets of familiarity, which come with the decision, give each a distinct advantage over those that travel to St. Louis. Even former major leaguer pitcher Jason Isringhausen recognized the convenience of the league setup, which allowed him to spend a few summer months developing amateur ballplayers on the same college field where he coached from August to May.

LCBL field managers were often among the youngest in any summer college baseball league. Upon being hired, managers selected an assistant coach and set aside at least one day a week for practice time.

The league's executive committee specifically targets coaches that get results with quiet respect instead of loud degradation. It is a point of extreme emphasis that coaches, who operate by means of intimidation, are not welcome. Believing it has no place in the game, Mahrt decided to use the league as a platform to send a small message on values to all levels of baseball. Thus, the LCBL managers are typically more approachable and relatable; a perfect fit with the casual, yet serious, atmosphere that comes with summer baseball.

Since LCBL franchises do not have owners or general managers, human resource decisions come from the executive committee, with neutrality and the league's best interest in mind. Mahrt believes the quality of the coach is directly attributable to a team's wins and losses, especially since recruiting is a huge component to the job description. Thus, teams that continue to struggle will be subjected to league intervention. The manager may be relegated to assistant coach status, while a new field manager is given an opportunity.

=== Corps of Discovery Cup ===
To settle the dispute as to which conference is best, a championship game at Busch Stadium crowns league supremacy. It is the second of two games on the Lewis & Clark Baseball League schedule played at the home of the St. Louis Cardinals. The first, the LCBL All-Star Game, allows the best individual players to share the same field as the pros. However, getting there a second time requires a total team effort. Mahrt and Clites decided to reward the conference winners with this championship opportunity, rather than another three- or five-game series at college fields.

The league believes that the players would gladly trade the fairness of a longer championship series for an opportunity to play a winner-take-all title game in a major league ballpark. It gives each player a goal that is both selfish and team-oriented: play in Busch Stadium twice in one year. The one-game finale also grants the league definitive closure. With student-athletes that need to return to campus in August, the conclusion of the season is set before the end of the previous calendar year.

The home team in the Discovery Cup Championship is also determined well before the night of. Giving it to the team with the higher regular-season winning percentage can be skewed by one conference's weaker competitors, and the lack of interleague play prevents head-to-head record deciding. For this reason — despite its unpopularity among baseball fans, including most LCBL executives — the winner of the league's All-Star Game dictates home-field advantage for that year's league championship.

Since, in the words of Clites, "we are all fans of pro ball, and imitation is the highest form of flattery," the LCBL takes as many pages from the Major League Baseball playbook as possible. Even if the policies are disliked, the league strives for continuity with the nuances of modern baseball. It helps the casual fans; no new quirks to learn, but rather the procedures of a major sports league to fall back on. Therefore, as long as the MLB All-Star Game determines the home team in the World Series, so shall it be for the LCBL.

List of League Champions

Year	Champion	Conf.	Manager	Runner-Up	Result	Postseason MVP
2013	West County Explorers	Clark	C. J. Bilbrey	O'Fallon Travelers	2-0	Jesse Abel, 2B/3B - Explorers
2014	Elsah Voyagers	Clark	C.J. Zeller	Lemay Governors	7-6	T.J. Singh, 1B - Voyagers
2015	Lemay Governors	Lewis	Ryan Suttenfield	St. Louis Gamers	6-4	Jake Nickelson, 1B - Governors

==== History of the trophy ====
The iconic Corps of Discovery Cup was graciously donated and repurposed by The Highlands Golf & Tennis Center, where Clites served as a golf operations manager. The cup and the base are actually separate pieces from two different tennis trophies. Both components have a unique, but revered, past.

The two-foot-tall stem belongs to a participation award given to, of all things, the Davis Cup tennis team from the nation of Ecuador. The clay courts at The Highlands hosted the 1961 Americas Zone semifinal matches of the world-famous Davis Cup, with Ecuador taking on the United States. Similar to modern soccer matches, the two sides exchanged gifts to express sportsmanship and welcome the visiting team. To commemorate the Latin American team on their final four appearance — in their first-ever Davis Cup tournament — St. Louis native, and star of the U.S. team, Chuck McKinley presented a brass cup to Ecuadorian captain Blas Uscocovich. The ornate top of the two-piece trophy traveled back to Ecuador, but its stand was temporary — used only to keep the cup off the clay surface for photos. It was found in storage of the St. Louis Tennis Hall of Fame at The Highlands.

The crown of the Corps of Discovery Cup comes from a different, even older, clay court contest. From 1910 until 1927, The Highlands St. Louis Amateur Athletic Association (Triple "A") — then known as the St. Louis Amateur Athletic Association (Triple "A") — played host to a regional qualifier for the esteemed U.S. Men's Clay Court Championships.

The Triple "A" tennis club was, and still is, a member of the United States National Lawn Tennis Association. The governing body has evolved since then: subsequently dropping the "National" and then the "Lawn" from its name. Whatever the acronym, the organization has consistently overseen this national championship (and their qualifying tournaments) for over a century. Now under modern USTA control, the U.S. Clay Court Championship is a prestigious ATP Tour event in Houston, Texas.

Like many governing bodies in sports, American tennis has always been broken into geographical regions. St. Louis currently operates in the USTA Missouri Valley chapter, but it was originally known as the USNLTA Gateway Section. Annually, amateur tennis players would come to The Highlands (St. Louis Triple "A") and play singles matches in a men's open tournament. The winner received a spot in the U.S. Clay Court Championship field, along with a cup with a "G" emblazoned, to represent the Gateway Section. At the end of each year's celebration, the player would advance to the national site (either Omaha, Chicago, Pittsburgh, Indianapolis, Cincinnati, Cleveland, Detroit, and even elsewhere in St. Louis), but the award was retained by the club for future winners.

The national tournament was not held in 1928 due to financial restructuring and a flu epidemic. When it returned the following year, Triple "A" was no longer a sectional site — and has not been selected since. Until the LCBL refurbished the cup, it had been collecting dust in the Tennis Hall of Fame for 85 years.

The league had planned to buy a new trophy from a store, but instead assembled the Corps of Discovery Cup from these older components, which are linked to earlier St. Louis sporting events. Like the Stanley Cup, the trophy combines parts with separate histories.

== Postseason awards ==
Deviating slightly from all the other historical tributes to Meriwether Lewis and William Clark, the Lewis & Clark Baseball League hopes to name awards for the league's best pitcher and best offensive player after two St. Louis Cardinals living legends; however, approval for use of those names is pending. Both men are esteemed members of the St. Louis community, and the LCBL hopes to make them honorary board members.

Each individual award is given only to one recipient. There is not a Pitcher of the Year in the Lewis Conference and the Clark Conference, for instance. The best in each conference never get a chance to face each other in the regular season, so they must put up statistics that speak for themselves. The only flaw in this model is the assumption that the talent in both conferences is nearly identical.

=== Top pitcher award ===
The award is annually given to the LCBL player with the most distinguished pitching season, regardless of role. This is solely determined by Pitcher Rating, a statistical equation created by Ross Clites in 2010. The formula takes into consideration individual winning percentage, saves (if any), strikeouts, ERA, WHIP, and a pitcher's run support average per start. It takes the subjectivity out of performances that only come around once a week. This is especially essential for pitchers in a summer league, where there's not a sample size of 30+ games and 100+ at-bats to judge. No manager can see all the starts made by each ace, and there is no safety net for an off-day. Thus, No voting and highest PR value wins.

List of Winners

Year	Pitcher	T	Team	W	L	SV	SO	ERA	WHIP	RS	Pitcher Rating
2013	James Ball	RH	Pioneers	5	1	1	46	1.65	1.10	6.88	68.17
2013 Runners-Up
	Rhett Quinlan	LH	Explorers	3	3	0	45	1.54	0.94	4.50	64.35
	Brandon Sarkissian	RH	Pathfinders	2	2	0	37	1.13	0.97	3.40	62.38
	Drue Bravo	RH	Travelers	4	3	0	46	2.02	1.07	4.75	56.31
Year	Pitcher	T	Team	W	L	SV	SO	ERA	WHIP	RS/GS	Pitcher Rating
2014	Justin Murphy	RH	Voyagers	7	0	0	41	1.42	1.11	6.83	71.32
2014 Runners-Up
	Ben Lovell	LH	Voyagers	6	3	0	56	2.48	1.33	8.44	62.78
	Rhett Quinlan	LH	Explorers	5	2	0	37	2.86	1.30	6.14	60.76
	Raymond Bailey	RH	Governors	5	1	3	28	2.32	1.36	11.67	59.88

Italics denote league leader

=== Offensive MVP award ===
The award is annually given to the LCBL player with the most distinguished offensive season. It is an MVP award that can only be won by a position player; pitchers have their own accolades. Not nearly as complex to explain as the crowning of the Top Pitcher Award, the Top Position Player Award simply requires a traditional voting process. It does, however, mirror the pitching award by rejecting any statistics accumulated during the postseason.

All managers and top assistant coaches receive a ballot, along with the Commissioner's Office). All use game logs from the SportsEngine statistic software to better inform their decisions, especially with those who play in the other conference. The Top Position Player Award winner consistently has offensive numbers in the top ten of the entire league. The voting echoes that of Major League Baseball, with a seemingly arbitrary vector of 14 points for first-place votes, 9 for second, 8 for third, and so on.

List of Winners

Year	Player	Pos.	Team	AVG	AB	XBH	R	RBI	OPS	BB	SO	SB
2013	Collin Henry	OF	Travelers	.404	89	11	19	22	1.080	17	8	8
2013 Runners-Up
	Jesse Abel	INF	Explorers	.435^{†}	62	10	20	22	1.311^{†}	5	5	8
	Mike Hardin	INF	Travelers	.380	71	11	24	24	1.076	11	7	10
Year	Player	Pos.	Team	AVG	AB	XBH	R	RBI	OPS	BB	SO	SB
2014	Yoonjae Nam	OF	Voyagers	.378	127	25	37	43	1.173	15	23	16
2014 Runners-Up
	Javier Ledesma	INF	Governors	.406	101	13	34	25	1.135	26	13	17
	John Udina	OF	Governors	.330	106	23	32	35	1.196	12	21	17

Italics denote league leader | † Not enough plate appearances to qualify for league-leading stat

=== All-Defensive Team ===
Much like professional baseball leagues honor their best glove men, the Lewis & Clark Baseball League annually lists a position-by-position all-defensive team. These nine athletes are voted on strictly by the commissioner's office, after looking over game logs of exceptional defensive plays and overall fielding percentage data. Players in both conferences are in competition for the same list.

New to Major League Baseball in 2011, and adapted for the LCBL, there are certain criterion regarding each position — most notably that each winner only qualifies at his primary spot. Catchers must be behind the plate in at least half of his team's games. All infielders and outfielders have a 5% boost to this requirement. For a shortstop to qualify, for example, he must play the position (at least one full inning) in 55% of his team's total games. As for pitchers, they need to average an inning pitched for every total team game.

List of Winners

2013	2014	2015

- Catcher - Wes Dorough, Pioneers
- First Base - Lance Portwood, Pioneers
- Second Base - Brad Ridings, Pioneers
- Shortstop - Jordan Bodenbach, Pioneers
- Third Base - Jesse Abel, Explorers
- Outfield - Tyler Ford, Explorers
- Outfield - Matt Polites, Travelers
- Outfield - Connor Einertson, Travelers
- Pitcher - Rhett Quinlan, Explorers

- Catcher - Ryan McCranie, Voyagers
- First Base - Jake Nickelson, Governors
- Second Base - Michael Venturella, Travelers
- Shortstop - Nick Ulrich, Explorers
- Third Base - Reed Brown, Explorers
- Outfield - Tyler Ormond, Pioneers
- Outfield - John Udina, Governors
- Outfield - Neal Boyce, Lookouts
- Pitcher - Ben Lovell, Voyagers

- Catcher -
- First Base -
- Second Base -
- Shortstop -
- Third Base -
- Outfield -
- Outfield -
- Outfield -
- Pitcher -

== All-Star Game ==
The annual Lewis & Clark All-Star Game pits the best players in the Clark Conference against the best in the Lewis Conference. It is played at the midpoint of the season in Busch Stadium, home of the St. Louis Cardinals. The event is also the league's Scout Day, a showcase for invited MLB personnel to evaluate the LCBL's best players.

The logo is a take on the MLB All-Star Game logo that the Cardinals used in 2009 when they hosted the 80th Midsummer Classic.

The league schedules the game during the week of July Fourth, giving all players a true week-long All-Star Break for family vacations. The event is obviously dependent on the Cardinals home schedule, but tends to fall on a Thursday night; a time when the odds for an empty Busch Stadium are increased by Major League Baseball's typical travel day. The 2014 All-Star Game was held on Thursday, July 3 at 7:30 p.m.

General admission to the game is free, and the main concourse concessions are open, but there are several ways for fans to pay a ticket price for an upgraded experience. For the friends and family that want to get as close to the action as possible, the league sells admission to the Cardinals Club. The infamous green seats (typically off-limits during amateur games) provide a front-row viewing experience directly behind home plate. The all-inclusive ticket comes with the full amenities of any pro gameday. It grants access to an internal bar/restaurant, with a wide range of food and beverages that can be delivered to the guest's seats while they watch.

Another option for spectators is the Double Play Benefit. The event raises money for 100 Neediest Cases — a subsidiary of the St. Louis United Way — and takes place in two stunning locations. Prior to the game, Double Play guests join league executives for a cocktail hour inside the home bullpen. As the pregame festivities wind down, the gala moves up to the Champions Club (luxury suite) for dinner and a chance to meet Cardinals legend Lou Brock. Friends and family enjoy finer dining at tables next to St. Louis' 11 World Series trophies.

Both tickets offered All-Star Game goers unmatched vantage points in Busch Stadium at prices that were significantly discounted from the market value of a professional game. The opportunity to get an autograph from a Hall of Famer was a complimentary bonus. The irony is that Lou Brock was asked to participate in the event long before the connection was made between the Lewis & Clark Baseball League and the St. Louis great's full name: Louis Clark Brock.

Prior to moving up to the Champions Club, Brock stopped by both dugouts to meet the Clark Conference and Lewis Conference All-Stars. Public address announcer John Ulett was on hand for player and coach introductions before the game. The voice of the Cardinals also called their names as they walked to the plate or entered the game to pitch.

The scoreboard prominently displayed the lineups as if LCBL players had been called up to the big leagues. Fox Sports Midwest camera crews filmed the game as intently as a Cubs vs. Cardinals game. The telecast only "aired" inside the ballpark, but was shown (complete with slow-motion replays) on all televisions in the luxury boxes and concourses. St. Louis Cardinals Director of Amateur Games Chris Breuer made sure everything, shy of the 46,000 fans, looked and felt like a pro game.

When it comes to player selection for the All-Star Game, the Lewis & Clark Baseball League deviates from its typical following of Major League Baseball procedures. Both the LCBL and MLB use a position-by-position balloting process, but the difference comes in the pitching staff. The reigning pennant-winning major league managers hand-pick their pitchers. The LCBL groups the pitchers with all other players into one pool for voting.

Those who cast the vote are different as well. Major League Baseball gives an unlimited number of ballots to each and every fan. The summer college league hardly has the developed fan base to pull off such a feat. Instead, the managers, league officials, and players come together to add their input.

The LCBL's vote is far more democratic; each elector only votes once. The 23 players on each team select their peers, with some stipulations. They cannot vote for members of the other conference. Put another way, no team is permitted to pick their opposition. This prevents one conference from stuffing the ballot with the weakest players in the other conference.

Also, players cannot select members of their own team. In essence, the players must look to the other teams in their conference and honestly select those that they trust in a pivotal game. Rather than a popularity contest or the staleness of players selecting only their own, LCBL voters must put some thought into the ballot. Receiving a peer vote is the ultimate sign of respect; a non-teammate selection recognizes a rival's talent enough to count on him to win the game. And that is where the voting format forces competitors to unify for a common purpose: team allegiances take a back seat to that of the conference. Players get tired of hearing that the weekend (or the weekday) is where the best talent in the league plays. The All-Star Game is the pinnacle bragging rights game, allowing players to settle it on the field. The winning conference sends a representative to the home dugout for the Discovery Cup Championship a month later.

LCBL managers submit 12 All-Star candidates (C, 1B, 2B, SS, 3B, OF, OF, OF, DH, SP, SP, RP) to the league by mid-June. All the manager's selections are assembled into team-specific ballots. Players on the Travelers, for example, receive a paper ballot with 60 names: 12 members, arranged by position, from each of the five other Lewis Conference teams. Voters select one player in each positional category (three outfielders, three pitchers). With each team's entire roster, manager, assistant coach, and five members of the LCBL administrative staff all voting, a unanimous All-Star selection would receive 135 votes (5 teams x 23 players + 5 managers + 5 coaches + 5 executives).

The roster is filled to a maximum of 26 players, based on the ballot results. Each conference's top two vote-getters at catcher, first, second, short, third, and designated hitter serve as the respective starters and back-ups. Each roster takes six outfielders, with their rank and alignment up to the discretion of the All-Star manager. The same is true for the eight pitchers (regardless of role) with the highest vote totals. Keeping in line with major league formalities, the managers from the previous season's Discovery Cup Championship call the shots in the All-Star Game. All other league managers serve as bench coaches.

Members of the Travelers and Pathfinders combined to beat the all-stars from the Pioneers and Explorers, in their one-and-only conditional season affiliated with the Clark Conference. The Lewis Conference won the game in an astonishing 1–0 shutout fashion. The feat matched the outcome of the 1968 Major League Baseball All-Star Game in Houston. Ten Lewis Conference pitchers combined to throw nine innings without giving up a run, surrendering just six hits.

List of Winners

Year	Team	Score	Winning Pitcher	All-Star Game MVP
2013	Lewis Conference	1-0	Matt Tracy, Travelers	Jared Storment, 1B - Pathfinders
2014	Lewis Conference	8-7	Will Miller, Explorers	Javier Ledesma, SS - Governors
2015	Lewis Conference	7-4	Justin Laffleur, Pioneers	Jamie Cooper, OF - Pioneers

Pitching

The first year of the LCBL saw several outstanding individual performances, as well as the establishment of impressive single-season high-water marks. The pinnacle achievement was the first — and only — no-hitter in league history, thrown by Brandon Sarkissian on June 29, 2013. The Pathfinders won the game 2–0 over the eventual league-champion Explorers; Sarkissian's final line was 9.0 IP, 0 ER, 0 H, 2 BB, 8 SO.

On July 13, 2013, James Ball of the Pioneers set the league record for strikeouts in a single game. His 12 punch-outs against the Pathfinders came in seven innings of work — a remarkable 57% of the outs recorded coming by way of strikeout. The 2013 Best Pitcher Award winner's 46 strikeouts tied the single-season record, matched by Drue Bravo of the Travelers.

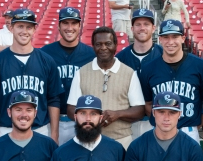
2013 Pioneers All-Stars with Cardinals legend, and Hall-of-Famer, Lou Brock

The 2013 Explorers pace the league record book in all the major regular-season team stats: Wins (19), ERA (3.09), and SO (180).

Defense

The longest defensive streak belongs to Connor Einertson of the Travelers. After committing his lone miscue in just the third inning of the entire season, he went on to set the LCBL record for 108 consecutive chances without an error. This is an active streak that will carry over to 2014. Einertson's .991 fielding percentage fell a mere .001 behind Lance Portwood for the single-season record (by a player with a minimum of 60 chances). Portwood contributed to the team record in the same defensive category; the 2013 Pioneers posted a .946 fielding percentage.

Offense

Arguably, the league's best offensive game is property of Jesse Abel of the Explorers. On June 7, 2013, Abel went 3-for-5 with two home runs, a double, and a record six RBIs. He reached base four times and scored three runs in an 11–6 win over the Pathfinders. The home runs were two of Abel's league-leading five HRs. Not to be outdone, Lucas Doerhoff of the Pioneers matched Abel's multi-home-run feat on July 21, 2013. Doerhoff, too, went 3-for-5 on his banner day, but added a triple to go with his pair of home runs. His 11 total bases set an LCBL record for a single game; albeit in a 12–11 loss to the Explorers.

Hits

A day after Jesse Abel produced his six RBI game, he became the first LCBL player to have a five-hit game. This record accomplishment was equaled on June 23, 2013, by two teammates in the same game. Jake Mavropolous and 2013 MVP Collin Henry, both of the Travelers, combined for ten hits (five singles, two doubles, and three triples) in a 13–7 victory. The fourth player to reach the five-hit milestone was yet another Travelers player, Mike Hardin, on July 27, 2013.

- Collin Henry (Travelers) is the single-season record holder with 36 hits, as well as records for batting average (.404) and triples: single-season (5) and single-game (2).
- Brad Ridings (Pioneers) holds the record of 15 doubles in a season. He also led the league with a 19-game hit streak, which is still active heading into the 2014 season.
- Nick Ulrich (Explorers) is the only player in league history to hit three doubles in one game (7/28/13).

The record for hits by a team in a single game is 21, by the Travelers (6/23/13). That team also holds the record for total hits in a regular season (271) and batting average (.312).

Runs

The record for runs scored by a team in a single game is 19 (Explorers over Pioneers - 6/1/14).

On six occasions a player in the league scored four runs in one game. Two of these instances occurred within a game where the team runs record was achieved. Brett Yasui of the Explorers scored four runs in the first 18-run game and Matt Polites of the Travelers matched the record in latter. Impressively, both players did so as the ninth hitters in their respective lineups.

- Mike Hardin (Travelers) scored four runs in a five-inning span (6/23/13).
- Brad Ridings (Pioneers) scored four runs, including twice in a record eight-run inning (7/27/13).
- Aaron Bossi (Explorers) twice scored four runs in a game (7/21/13 and 7/27/13). During the July 21 game, he stole four bases — a record for most in a single game. Bossi's 22 total steals are also the single-season high.

The record for runs scored by a team in a regular season is 266, by the 2013 Explorers.

Winning & Losing Streaks

The Pioneers had the longest winning streak in the regular season — five games. The Explorers ended the 2013 regular season as winners of four straight games, so they enter 2014 on a six-game win streak (counting the two-game sweep in the Discovery Series). The 2013 Pathfinders will go down in history for their futility. They finished the season as losers of 15 consecutive games.

All individual and team records were compiled using GameChanger software.

== Future Expansion ==
The league is continually on the lookout for college-quality baseball fields for each team to permanently call home. There are plenty of fields that can host a weekend here or there, but very few have enough summer schedule flexibility to accommodate a 37-game season. Most college facilities have summer camps or youth tournaments that would conflict with LCBL games. One potential solution is the creation of a new baseball-only four-field complex in St. Louis, though no plans are currently in the works.

The interest in 12 separate fields stems from the league's desire to eventually turn over control of each ballclub's operations. The LCBL would look like a traditional sports league, with independent franchises that make their own personnel and marketing decisions. The prerequisite to this transition is a facility for each general manager; a stable single-occupant headquarters for the team to develop a "home" fan base and hold consistent practices. Each independent franchise would then be able to charge admission to generate revenue to reinvest.

The league has been instrumental in the re-purposing of Francis R. Slay Park and the refurbishing of Harris-Stowe State University's historic Hornets Field. Both are substandard college fields that hope to be top-tier facilities by 2016. These efforts have been spearheaded by Clites, who holds a Master of Architecture degree, in collaboration with city politicians, school officials, and local planning committees. He is in the developmental stage of incorporating Bat Flip, Inc. — a company he created in college — as a field renovation division of the LCBL.

The immediate growth potential for the league is with its Find Your Way Program. The LCBL is constantly working to build brand awareness within the business community of St. Louis. More internship opportunities for the student-athletes is the number one goal each offseason. This starts with greater internal hiring; compensating more players to update the website, compile stats, maintain the field, etc. The LCBL plans to stream radio broadcasts of their future games, employing sports journalism majors at local colleges.

For the fans, the LCBL created an organization for alumni, friends, and family to stay connected to their favorite LCBL team. The league charges a small, one-time fee for preferred fan status. Known as the Hadley's Quadrant Club — in reference to the famous navigation tool of Lewis and Clark's expedition — members receive T-shirts, hats, decals, and season tickets for their LCBL loyalty. To gain access at all admission gates, season pass holders will wear (or present) a Stand Up to Cancer wristband.

In time, the league hopes to join the National Alliance of College Summer Baseball. With the NACSB comes all the pomp and financial support of being recognized by Major League Baseball. The eight members of the esteemed association are recognized as some of the best summer collegiate baseball leagues in the United States. Sanctioning the Lewis & Clark Baseball League would fill a void in the heartland of the country; North Carolina is currently the westernmost state with a team in the NACSB.

The parent company of the LCBL — the Leagues of Extraordinary Gentlemen — has its next stop planned for Denver, Colorado. Mahrt plans to take the success of the St. Louis league back to the place where he attended law school (University of Denver). Branded as the Thin Air Baseball League, play is slated to begin in 2016.

Mahrt and Clites have ambitions of taking their baseball brand to Australia for a winter league, and to Prague, Czech Republic for a college recruiting showcase camp. Both endeavors plan to be operational by 2018.
