= NABF =

NABF may refer to:

- National Amateur Baseball Federation, a governing body for amateur baseball in the United States
- North American Boxing Federation
