= Rossville, Kansas =

City in Shawnee County, Kansas, United States

- City
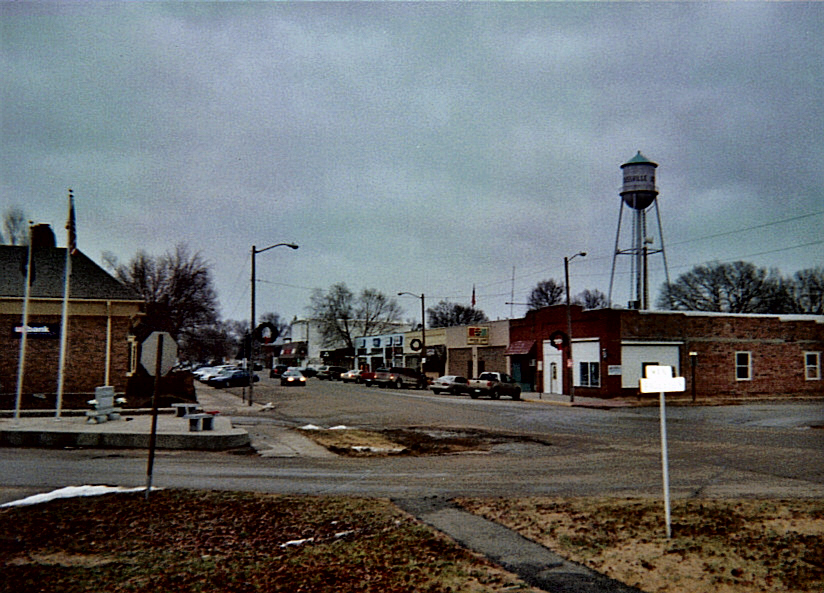
- Downtown Rossville (2006)

- Location within Shawnee County and Kansas

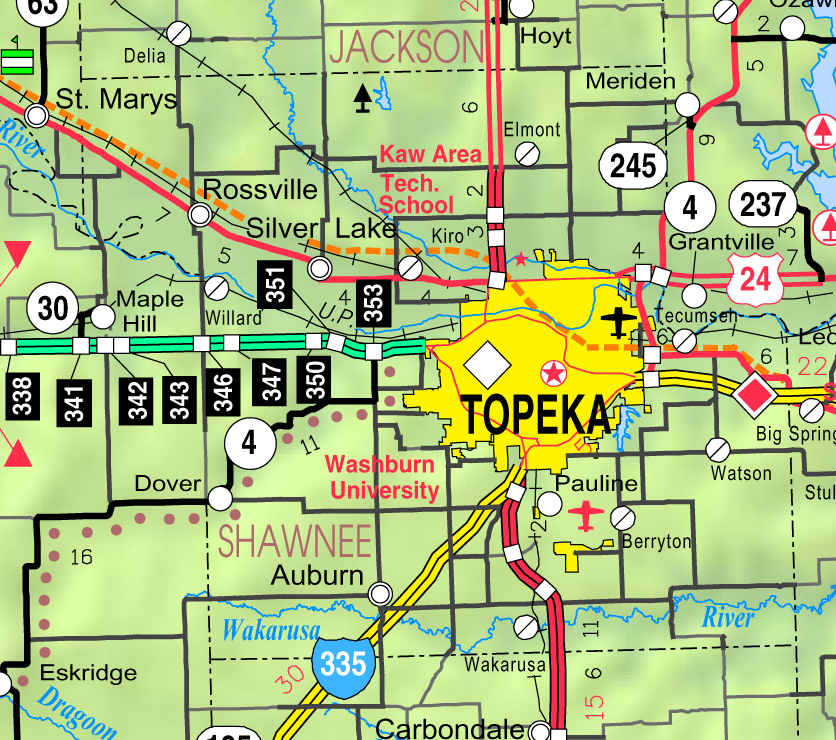
- KDOT map of Shawnee County (legend)
- Coordinates: 39°08′09″N 95°56′59″W
- Country: United States
- State: Kansas
- County: Shawnee
- Founded: 1871
- Incorporated: 1881
- Named for: William Ross

Area
  - Total: 0.55 sq mi (1.43 km^{2})
  - Land: 0.55 sq mi (1.43 km^{2})
  - Water: 0 sq mi (0.00 km^{2})
- Elevation: 925 ft (282 m)

Population (2020)
  - Total: 1,105
  - Density: 2,000/sq mi (773/km^{2})
- Time zone: UTC-6 (CST)
  - Summer (DST): UTC-5 (CDT)
- ZIP Code: 66533
- Area code: 785
- FIPS code: 20-61400
- GNIS ID: 2396438
- Website: rossvillekansas.us

Rossville is a city in Shawnee County, Kansas, United States. As of the 2020 census, the population of the city was 1,105.

== History ==
Rossville was founded in 1871. It was named for William W. Ross, a Kansas reporter.

In 1889, an all women ticket won mayor and city council.

== Geography ==
According to the United States Census Bureau, the city has a total area of 0.61 square miles (1.58 km^{2}), all land.

=== Climate ===
The climate in this area is characterized by hot, humid summers and generally mild to cool winters. According to the Köppen Climate Classification system, Rossville has a humid subtropical climate, abbreviated "Cfa" on climate maps.

== Demographics ==
Historical population
Census	Pop.	Note	%±
1880	323		—
1890	420		30.0%
1900	555		32.1%
1910	672		21.1%
1920	664		−1.2%
1930	701		5.6%
1940	601		−14.3%
1950	577		−4.0%
1960	797		38.1%
1970	934		17.2%
1980	1,045		11.9%
1990	1,052		0.7%
2000	1,014		−3.6%
2010	1,151		13.5%
2020	1,105		−4.0%
U.S. Decennial Census

Rossville is part of the Topeka metropolitan area.

=== 2010 census ===
At the 2010 census there were 1,151 people in 413 households, including 293 families, in the city. The population density was 1,886.9 inhabitants per square mile (728.5/km^{2}). There were 448 housing units at an average density of 734.4 per square mile (283.6/km^{2}). The racial makup of the city was 92.3% White, 0.7% African American, 4.2% Native American, 0.2% Asian, 0.4% from other races, and 2.3% from two or more races. Hispanic or Latino of any race were 4.9%.

Of the 413 households 39.2% had children under the age of 18 living with them, 52.5% were married couples living together, 13.6% had a female householder with no husband present, 4.8% had a male householder with no wife present, and 29.1% were non-families. 24.9% of households were one person and 13.1% were one person aged 65 or older. The average household size was 2.62 and the average family size was 3.15.

The median age was 35.5 years. 30.1% of residents were under the age of 18; 6.4% were between the ages of 18 and 24; 25% were from 25 to 44; 20.3% were from 45 to 64; and 18.2% were 65 or older. The gender makeup of the city was 46.1% male and 53.9% female.

=== 2000 census ===
At the 2000 census, there were 1,014 people in 383 households, including 279 families, in the city. The population density was 2,075.2 inhabitants per square mile (801.2/km^{2}). There were 411 housing units at an average density of 841.1 per square mile (324.8/km^{2}). The racial makup of the city was 94.48% White, 1.68% Native American, 0.59% Asian, 0.89% from other races, and 2.37% from two or more races. Hispanic or Latino of any race were 2.37% of the population.

Of the 383 households 37.6% had children under the age of 18 living with them, 59.0% were married couples living together, 10.7% had a female householder with no husband present, and 26.9% were non-families. 24.0% of households were one person and 12.5% were one person aged 65 or older. The average household size was 2.52 and the average family size was 2.98.

The age distribution was 27.1% under the age of 18, 5.1% from 18 to 24, 28.3% from 25 to 44, 22.5% from 45 to 64, and 17.0% 65 or older. The median age was 38 years. For every 100 females, there were 88.5 males. For every 100 females age 18 and over, there were 80.7 males.

The median household income was $44,118 and the median family income was $53,333. Males had a median income of $37,917 versus $25,347 for females. The per capita income for the city was $20,103. About 2.2% of families and 3.1% of the population were below the poverty line, including 2.4% of those under age 18 and 5.4% of those age 65 or over.

== Education ==
The community is served by Kaw Valley USD 321 public school district. It serves portions of the Tri-County area which includes Shawnee, Wabaunsee, Pottawatomie Counties, as well as portions of Jackson County.

== Sports ==
Rossville was once home to a Summer Collegiate baseball team, the Rossville Rattlers. In 2013, the Rattlers won the National Baseball Congress 19 and Under World Series. The Rattlers played at Joe Campbell Memorial Stadium. The Rattlers were members of the Mid-Plains League The Rossville Rattlers ceased operations at the end of the 2017 season.
