= Metropolitan Collegiate Summer Baseball League of Illinois =

American collegiate summer baseball league

- Sport: Baseball
- Founded: 1978
- No. of teams: 8
- Countries: United States
- Continent: North America
- Most recent champion: Crystal Lake Cardinals
- Website: http://metrocollegebaseball.com

The Metropolitan Collegiate Summer Baseball League of Illinois is a collegiate summer baseball league consisting of eight teams based in Illinois. Formed in 1978, the league is affiliated within the National Amateur Baseball Federation. The majority of the teams are located in the Chicago, Illinois metropolitan area.

== League Notes ==
The Metropolitan Collegiate Summer Baseball League of Illinois (MCBSI) is nicknamed the "Metro League." Founded in 1978, the League was originally named the Metro Thoroughbred League of Illinois, before the league name was changed in 1987 to Metropolitan Collegiate Summer Baseball League of Illinois.

The league notes that: "College players, home for the summer, can enjoy their families and friends, together with participating in a good competitive league. Official Major League (American League) rules are used with the exception of mandatory use of double ear flap helmets and college safety slide rule. The league has used wood bats since 1992."

The Metropolitan Collegiate Summer Baseball League of Illinois plays an annual All-Star game against the Chicago Suburban League All-Stars. The 2018 All-Star Game was played at Hoffer Field on Judson University’s campus in Elgin, Illinois.

The league included the following eight teams for 2019: Crystal Lake Cardinals, Force Elite Baseball, Kane County Phantoms, Wheaton White Sox, Chicago Mudcats, Illinois Indians, Illinois Cardinals, Windy City Prospects.

2025 Teams
North Division	Athletes HQ
North Division	Crystal Lake Cardinals
North Division	Illinois Indians
North Division	Hit Dogs
South Division	Aurora Thunder
South Division	Kane County Phantoms
South Division	Illinois Hawks
South Division	Wheaton White Sox
