= Atlantic Baseball Confederation =

American college summer baseball league

Founded in 2002, the Atlantic Baseball Confederation Collegiate League is a 12-team collegiate summer baseball league composed of teams located throughout New Jersey.

The league President is Mike Kolesar.

The ABCCL aims to prepare collegiate baseball players for their spring seasons and to play professionally post-graduation. Many ABCCL alums have played in the major, minor, and independent baseball leagues.

== Current Teams ==
CPBA
Clemente Baseball
Gamers
Jersey Jackrabbits
Morris County Cubs
Untamed Baseball
Frazier Baseball
Garden State Junebugs
Obsessed Baseball
SI Orioles
Sportika
WBC Astros

== Notable alumni ==
- Ryan Buchter, major league pitcher
- Ryan Doherty, minor league pitcher
- Ryan Doolittle, major league pitcher
- Gordon Graceffo, pitcher
- Joshua Kuroda-Grauer, infielder
- Michael Caldon, pitcher
- Brent Francisco, pitcher
- Ryan Kalish, outfielder
- Cole Kimball, pitcher
- Fernando Perez, outfielder
- David Kubiak, pitcher
- Joe Serrapica, pitcher
- Howie Brey, pitcher
- AJ Candelario, pitcher
- Trey Dombroski, pitcher
- Danny Wilkinson, pitcher
- Ryan Lasko, outfielder
- Jay Harry, infielder
- Justin Johnson, infielder
- Nick Payero, pitcher
- Zach Rogacki, catcher
- Dylan Palmer, infielder
- Reece Moroney, infielder

== Past champions ==
- 2026 - Clemente Baseball
- 2025 - Untamed Baseball
- 2024 - Monsoons
- 2023 - Sportika
- 2022 - CGI Monsoons
- 2021 - Union County Gamers
- 2020 - Langan Falcons
- 2019 - Freehold Clippers
- 2018 - Ocean Giants
- 2017 - New Brunswick Matrix
- 2016 - Freehold Clippers
- 2015 - Monmouth Monarchs
- 2014 - Monmouth Monarchs
- 2013 - Monmouth Monarchs
- 2012 - Toms River Hurricanes
- 2011 - Monmouth Monarchs
- 2010 - Protocall Stars
- 2009 - Monmouth Monarchs
- 2008 - Manchester Yankees
- 2007 - Jersey Shore Tides
- 2006 - Freehold Clippers
- 2005 - Toms River Black Sox
- 2004 - Toms River Black Sox

== League Awards ==
Year	MVP	Cy Young
2025	Shane Andrus, University of Maine (Sportika)	Tyler Kane, Rutgers (Sportika)
2024	Christian Bauman, Felician University (Clippers)	Paden Mather, Wagner College (Untamed)
2023	Jacob Ramirez, MCCC (Frazier)	James Pazdera, Ramapo (Monsoons)
2022	Tyler Ruban, William Paterson (Monsoons)	Orin Winslow, St. Thomas Aquinas (Legends)
2021	Joe Brong, Saint Elizabeth University (Gamers)	Dan Merkel, Wagner College (Elite)
2020	Shore: Justin Kapuscinski, Marist College (Langan); North: Justin Johnson, Lafayette College (Gamers)	Shore: Oliver McCarthy, Duke University (Langan); North: Ryan Monroy, Susquehanna University (Monsoons)
