= Collegiate Baseball League Europe =

- Sport: Baseball
- Founded: 2012
- Folded: 2017
- No. of teams: 6
- Country: Europe
- Last champion: La Rochelle Admirals (2017)

Collegiate Baseball League Europe (CBLE) was a wood bat summer collegiate baseball league based in Oosterhout, Netherlands.

The league consisted of the East Division (Vienna Emperors, Prague Dragons, Amsterdam Bombers) and the West Division (London Cavaliers, Sant Boi Falcons of Barcelona, La Rochelle Admirals). Players had the opportunity to choose their preferred division. Each year in April, the coaching staff drafted their team rosters.

== History ==
The league's president was Jan Maarten Kops. The inaugural tournament was held in July 2012 with 56 players from 10 countries. All games were played at "Sportpark de Slotbosse Toren", home of the Twins Oosterhout.

In 2014 the league expanded to London, Barcelona, and La Rochelle. On April 17, 2014, the CBLE announced an agreement with the Northwoods League to offer their top players the opportunity to play with the Elite College players in the US.

In September 2014, 10 CBLE alumni represented 5 countries at the European Baseball Championship in Germany and the Czech Republic. In December 2014, the CBLE announced it added venues in Vienna, Prague and Amsterdam. CBLE's hometown Oosterhout hosted the East vs. West All Star game, the CBLE Championship Series playoffs and the Championship Game.

On the list in both total wins and winning percentage, the Sant Boi Barcelona Falcons are the all-time leaders (33, .635). The remaining list comprises La Rochelle Admirals (29, .635), Praha Dragons (14, .467), Amsterdam Bombers (13, .406), Vienna Emperors (13, .481) and London Cavaliers (11, .344).

== Teams ==
Collegiate Baseball League Europe
Team	Entered	Head coach	Manager
La Rochelle Admirals	2012	Jay Hemond	Serge Meijer
London Cavaliers	2012	Mitchell Berghmans	Frank Cramer
Sant Boi Falcons of Barcelona	2012	Chris Cummings	Mike Graham
Amsterdam Bombers	2012	David Yamana	Felix Brown
Prague Dragons	2015 expansion	Mark Wisthoff	René Fischer
Vienna Emperors	2015 expansion		

== Regular-season champions and runners-up ==
- 2015: Sant Boi Falcons of Barcelona, Praha Dragons
- 2016: Sant Boi Falcons of Barcelona, Vienna Emperors
- 2017: Sant Boi Falcons of Barcelona, La Rochelle Admirals

== CBLE Championship Series champions and finalists ==
- 2012: Sant Boi Falcons of Barcelona, London Cavaliers
- 2013: La Rochelle Admirals, Sant Boi Falcons of Barcelona
- 2014: La Rochelle Admirals, Sant Boi Falcons of Barcelona
- 2015: Sant Boi Falcons of Barcelona, Praha Dragons
- 2016: La Rochelle Admirals, Sant Boi Falcons of Barcelona
- 2017: La Rochelle Admirals, Amsterdam Bombers

== Notable CBLE alumni ==
- Jesse Aussems
- Stijn van der Meer
- Owen Ozanich
- Mathew Smith
- Quentin Becquey
- Oscar Combes
- Daniel Schmidt

== See also ==
- London Mets
- Amsterdam Pirates
- Tempo Titans Praha
