= Collegiate summer baseball =

Amateur baseball leagues for college students

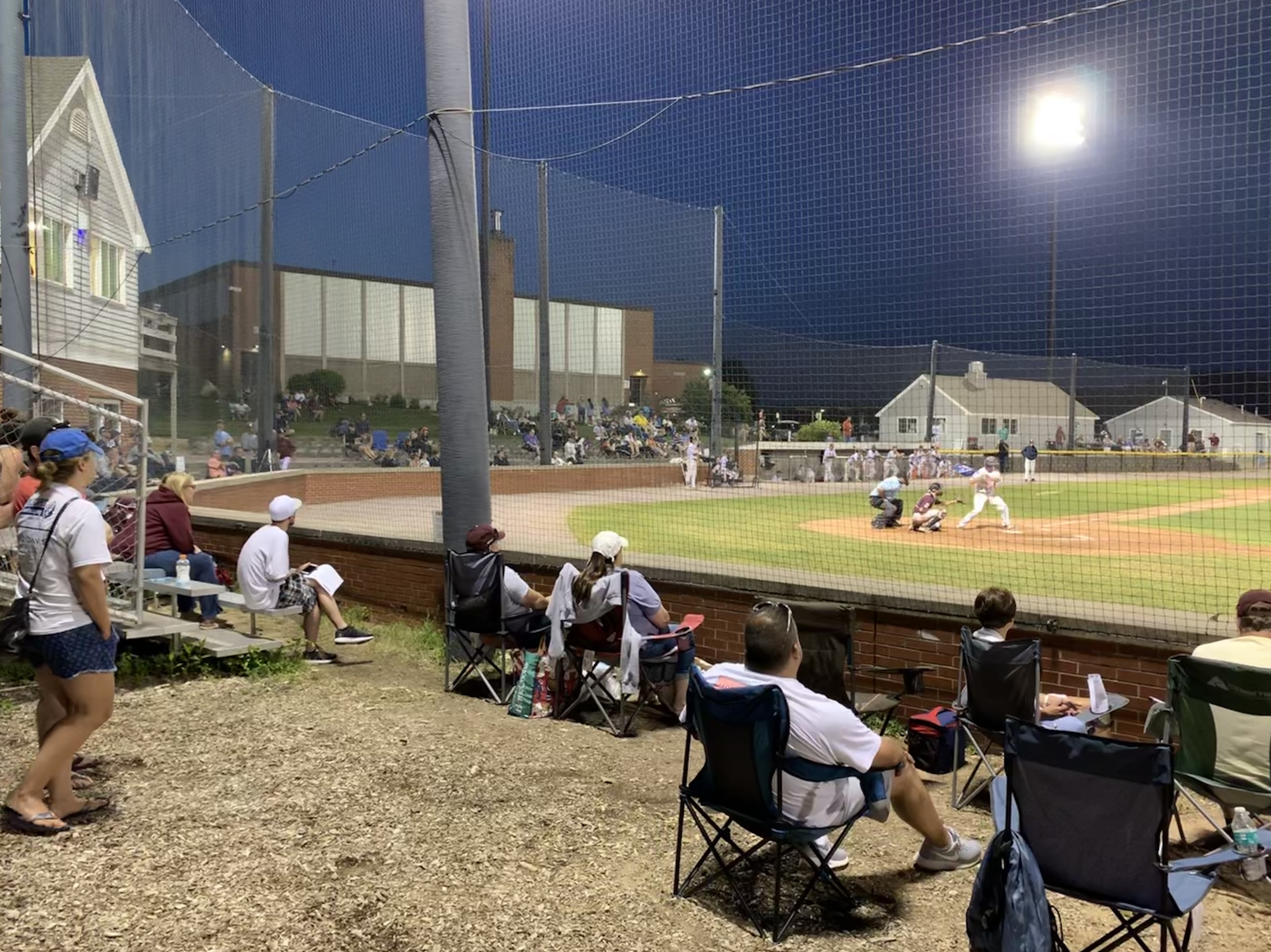
A Cape Cod Baseball League night game at Doran Park in Bourne, Massachusetts

Collegiate summer baseball leagues are amateur baseball leagues in the United States and Canada for players who have typically attended at least one year of college and have at least one year of athletic eligibility remaining. Generally, they operate from early June to early August. Unlike college baseball, which permits players to use baseball bats made of aluminum or other inorganic materials, these leagues require wooden bats—hence the nickname "wood-bat leagues". The leagues enable college baseball players to compete—and professional scouts to observe them—with professional rules and equipment.

To find a collegiate summer team, players work with their college coaches and prospective teams' general managers. They report to summer leagues after completing their spring collegiate season, arriving late if their college team goes deep into postseason play. Players drafted during the collegiate summer season may remain with the team until they sign a professional contract.

Summer leagues often housed their players with volunteer host families in the area, but the recent flow of money to baseball's lower leagues has enabled some teams to put their players up in local hotels. They generally travel by private coach bus to and from road games, and stay in hotels during road trips.

The leagues vary greatly in their attendances, quality of play, and ability to attract scouts. The Cape Cod Baseball League (CCBL) is considered to the premier collegiate summer league in the country.

Major governing bodies of collegiate summer baseball include the National Alliance of College Summer Baseball, National Amateur Baseball Federation, National Baseball Congress, and MLB and USA Baseball co-sponsored Prospect Development Pipeline.

== Active leagues ==
- Alaska Baseball League
- Appalachian League
- Atlantic Baseball Confederation
- Atlantic Collegiate Baseball League
- Cal Ripken Collegiate Baseball League
- California Collegiate League
- Cape Cod Baseball League
- Coastal Plain League
- Florida Collegiate Summer League
- Futures Collegiate Baseball League
- Great Lakes Summer Collegiate League
- Hamptons Collegiate Baseball League
- Independence League Baseball
- Jayhawk Collegiate League
- Metropolitan Collegiate Summer Baseball League of Illinois
- Mid-Plains League
- M.I.N.K. Collegiate Baseball League
- MLB Draft League
- New England Collegiate Baseball League
- New York Collegiate Baseball League
- Northwoods League
- Pacific Empire League
- Perfect Game Collegiate Baseball League
- Prospect League
- Rockingham County Baseball League
- Sunbelt Baseball League
- Texas Collegiate League
- Valley Baseball League
- West Coast League
- Western Canadian Baseball League

== Defunct leagues ==
- Basin League
- Central Illinois Collegiate League
- Clark Griffith Collegiate Baseball League
- Collegiate Baseball League Europe
- Expedition League
- Far West League
- Great West League
- Hawaii Collegiate Baseball League
- Horizon Air Summer Series
- Lewis & Clark Baseball League
- Northern League
- Puget Sound Collegiate League
- Saskatchewan Major Baseball League
- Wild Wild West League
