= Hawaii Collegiate Baseball League =

The Hawaii Collegiate Baseball League is a collegiate summer baseball league featuring the Waikiki Surfers, Oahu Paddlers, Hawai'i Ali'is and Kamuela Paniolos. All games are played at Aloha Stadium at Halawa. The league played its inaugural season in summer of 2005.

In 2006 the Kauai Menehune and the Waimea Waves were added to the league.

In 2007 games were held at Les Murakami Stadium on the University of Hawaii Manoa campus.

== Notable players ==
- Joc Pederson
