= Ryan Kalish =

American baseball player (born 1988)

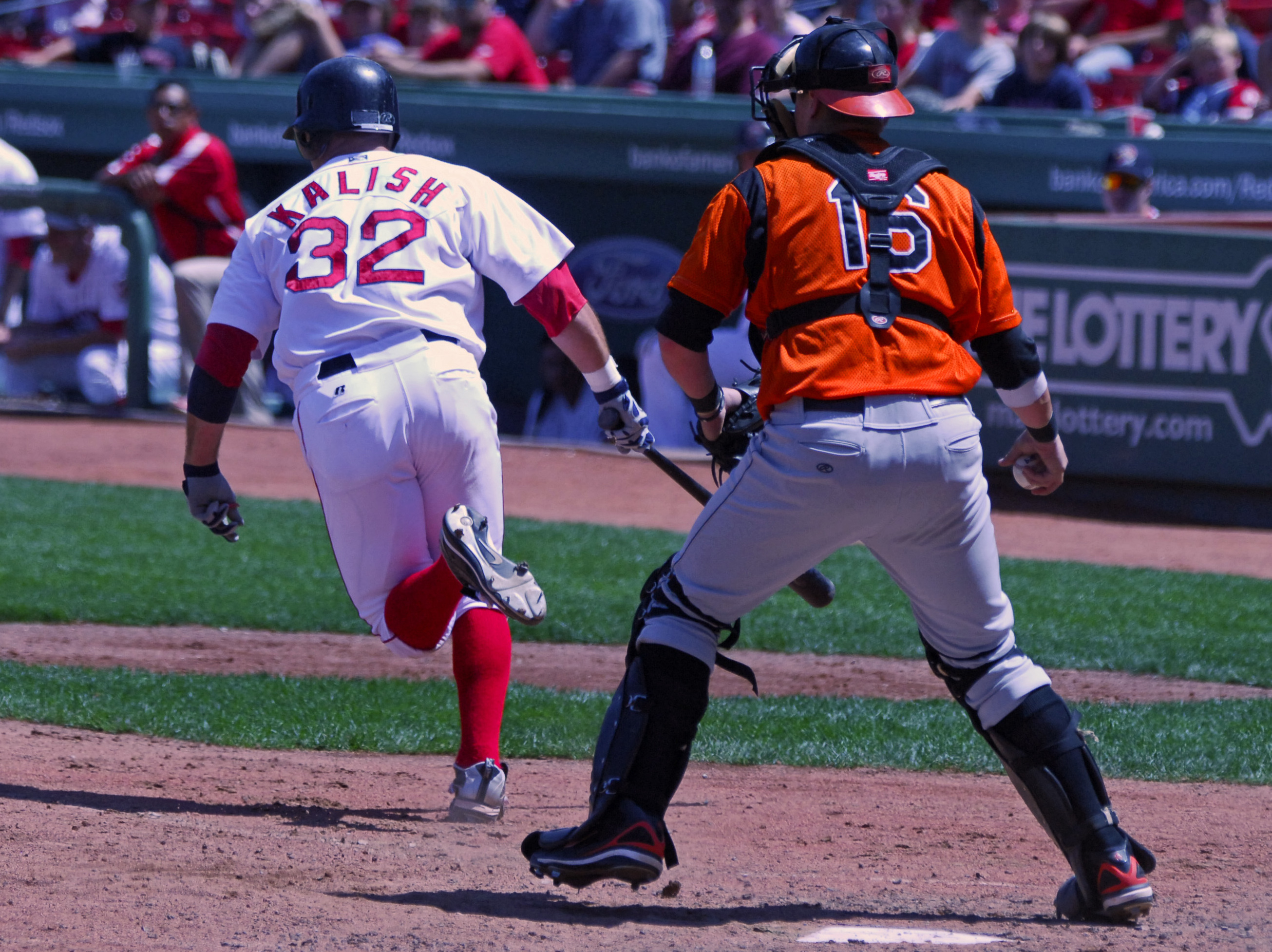
- Kalish (left) with the Portland Sea Dogs in 2009
- Outfielder
- Born: March 28, 1988 (age 38); Northridge, California, U.S.
- Batted: Left Threw: Left

MLB debut
- July 31, 2010, for the Boston Red Sox

Last MLB appearance
- May 11, 2016, for the Chicago Cubs

MLB statistics
- Batting average: .245
- Home runs: 4
- Runs batted in: 36
- Stats at Baseball Reference

Teams
- Boston Red Sox (2010, 2012); Chicago Cubs (2014, 2016)

Ryan Michael Kalish (born March 28, 1988) is an American former professional baseball outfielder. He played in Major League Baseball (MLB) for the Boston Red Sox in 2010 and 2012 and for the Chicago Cubs in 2014 and 2016.

A standout high school baseball and football player, he was drafted by the Red Sox in 2006. In the minor leagues, he was twice voted the Red Sox Minor League Base-Stealer of the Month (June 2007 & April 2009), and was also named a New York–Penn League All-Star (2007), a Red Sox Minor League Player of the Month (July 2008), and the Red Sox Minor League Offensive Player of the Year (2009).

Kalish debuted in the major leagues in 2010, and at the end of the season was voted the Red Sox Rookie of the Year. He missed almost the entire 2011 and 2013 seasons, as a result of an injury that led to shoulder/neck surgeries. He started the 2014 season on the Opening Day roster of the Chicago Cubs, and split it between the major league team and Triple-A Iowa.

== Early life ==
Kalish is the son of Steven and Eileen Plata Kalish, who were both born in Dorchester, Massachusetts, and grew up in the Boston area. He was born in Northridge, Los Angeles, and grew up in Shrewsbury, New Jersey. His brother Jake Kalish is a pitcher in the Kansas City Royals system, and played for Team Israel at the 2017 World Baseball Classic.

His father is Jewish and his mother is Catholic. His maternal grandfather was born in Nowy Sącz in southern Poland.

== High school and draft ==
Kalish was one of New Jersey's top high school baseball players. Pitching and playing outfield as a four-year starter for Red Bank Catholic High School, he won all-conference and all-division honors. As a freshman in April 2003, in his first varsity pitching start, Kalish struck out ten batters in six innings. As a sophomore, in May 2004 he pitched a seven-inning no-hitter. For the season, he batted .507 with 32 stolen bases, and on the mound he had a 6–1 won-lost record with a 1.60 ERA. In his senior season he hit .422 with 30 stolen bases. Baseball America reported that it may be "apocryphal", but that "legend has it that Kalish didn't swing and miss at a single pitch as a high school senior." Confirming that, Red Sox scout Ray Fagant, who followed him in high school, said: "He went his entire senior year without a swing and miss once. He made hard contact every time." He batted .466 in high school, leading his team in batting his last three years. As a pitcher, he threw an 88–89 mph fastball, and what his coach called "a good curveball [and] ... a real nice change-up", and had 190 career strikeouts.

Kalish was also a standout high school football player, playing quarterback, strong safety, and punter for his school's football team, and leading it to a division championship. The team's head coach said: "He's as talented a player as we’ve had at the QB position." In October 2005, his 42-yard pass under pressure helped seal the school's upset victory over Manasquan in the Shore Conference Liberty Division. In December 2005, he was voted First-Team All-Shore League. In addition, he played forward for the school's basketball team. In the summer of 2006, he played for the Middletown Monarchs in the Atlantic Baseball Confederation, a summer collegiate baseball league. In 2006, he was named the Jersey Shore Sports Hall of Fame High School Male Athlete of the Year.

Coming out of high school, Kalish was rated the # 76 baseball prospect in the U.S., and the # 2 prospect in New Jersey by Baseball America. He considered going to Rutgers, and playing both baseball and football there. But he committed to attending the University of Virginia, with whom he signed on scholarship with the understanding that at least for his freshman year he would only play baseball.

Given his commitment to college, he was not drafted until the 9th round of the 2006 Major League Baseball draft, when he was picked by the Boston Red Sox. The Red Sox signed him, for $600,000—an amount that was consistent with what second-round draft prospects received, but well over the norm for a 9th-rounder. Major League Baseball's Commissioner's Office held up his signing initially, as the amount of money exceeded his draft slot, but approved it by late August. The signing was not without other problems, however. Kalish explained: "My girlfriend, but especially her dad, are Yankees fans. It was brutal. She was like, "I can't believe I have to wear a Red Sox hat now!"

== Minor leagues ==
=== Boston Red Sox organization ===
By July 3, 2007, Kalish's "game-changing speed" had him leading the New York–Penn League with 12 stolen bases for the short season Lowell Spinners and he was named the Red Sox organization's Base Stealer of the Month for June. He followed that up by being named New York Penn-League Player of the Week, for the week beginning July 9. Kalish batted .800 for the week with a 1.533 slugging percentage, set a team record with three hits in each of the four games, and tied a team record by reaching base in 11 consecutive plate appearances. The Lowell Sun opined, "Ryan Kalish, Lowell's dynamic center fielder, is putting together a stretch perhaps not seen in the Spinners' history." His .476 on-base percentage was fourth-best in the league, and his batting average was fifth-best.

On July 16, 2007, Kalish was hit by a pitch which broke the hamate bone in his right (non-throwing) wrist. At the time, he was leading the league in both stolen bases and runs scored, and batting .368 with a .471 on-base percentage and a .540 slugging percentage. The injury ended his season. After waiting to see if his wrist would heal on its own, he had surgery late in the season. He was voted a New York Penn-League All Star, and Baseball America still ranked him the 6th-best prospect in the league. Lowell manager Gary DiSarcina compared him to former major leaguer Darin Erstad, noting their common intensity. "Speed and guts", said DiSarcina. "I love him. He's my favorite player."

In January 2008, Peter Gammons called Kalish one of the three top hitting prospects in the Red Sox organization, and Baseball America rated him the 6th-best player in the organization and projected him as the parent team's starting left fielder in 2011. In February 2008 Baseball America rated him # 96 in its annual list of the Top 100 Prospects in baseball. He struggled in 2008 while coming back from his surgery, as he split the season between the Single-A Greenville Drive and Lancaster JetHawks, despite being awarded the Red Sox organization Player of the Month Award for July and being fifth in the Red Sox system with 19 stolen bases. After the season, he played for the North Shore Honu, in the Hawaii Winter League.

In early 2009 he had a slow start, despite being named the organization's Base-stealer of the Month in April for stealing 7 bases in 8 attempts over 19 games while playing for Single-A Salem Red Sox, and being named the Carolina League's # 9 prospect. In the second half of the season, which he ended with the Double-A Portland Sea Dogs, with his wrist finally healed, he batted .302, with a .384 on-base percentage and a .561 slugging percentage. The Red Sox named him their 2009 Minor League Offensive Player of the Year, as for the year he led Red Sox minor leaguers in walks (68), runs (84), and total bases (231), and was second in homers (18), fourth in RBIs (77), and tied for fifth in stolen bases (21). His 21 stolen bases came in 27 attempts. After the 2009 season, he played in the Arizona Fall League for the Mesa Solar Sox, batting .301 with a .384 on-base percentage. In December 2009, Baseball America ranked him the organization's # 5 prospect.

Starting 2010 with the Sea Dogs, in 41 games Kalish batted .293, leading the team in runs (35), home runs (8), and stolen bases (13; fifth in the league), while he was fourth in the Eastern League in walks (28) and on-base percentage (.404). He also became the ninth player in team history to have five hits in one game. He moved up to the Triple-A Pawtucket Red Sox, and between the two teams in 2010 he batted .294/.382/.502 with 25 steals, while being caught 3 times. Pawtucket manager Torey Lovullo said: "He's as close as any player I’ve ever managed to being a superstar."

Kalish developed a reputation in the minor leagues for being solid, fast (stealing bases through 2009 at an 82% success rate), aggressive and hard-nosed on defense and on the bases, and patient at the plate.

Kalish began 2011 with Pawtucket. He injured his left shoulder making a diving catch on April 21, after 14 games. He was slated to play his first rehab game for Short-Season Lowell on August 4, playing DH and outfield.

=== Toronto Blue Jays organization ===
On December 17, 2014, Kalish agreed to a minor league contract with the Toronto Blue Jays that included an invitation to spring training. However, the deal was not completed.

=== Comeback attempt ===
In the winter of 2015–16, Kalish began playing for Criollos de Caguas in the Puerto Rican winter league, hoping to attract the interest of scouts after his recuperation from multiple surgeries. On February 18, 2016, he signed with the Sioux City Explorers of the American Association, an independent league.

=== Canberra Cavalry ===
During the winter of 2017-2018, Kalish played for the Canberra Cavalry of the Australian Baseball League.

=== New Britain Bees and retirement ===
On February 6, 2018, Kalish signed with the New Britain Bees of the Atlantic League of Professional Baseball. After playing in a spring training game on April 20, Kalish determined that his knee was not healthy enough to continue his playing career, and he subsequently retired.

== Major leagues ==
=== Boston Red Sox ===
==== 2010 ====
Observing Kalish in spring training in February 2010, Gordon Edes of ESPN wrote: "Remember the name. This may be his first big league camp, but Kalish ... gives off the vibe of someone on a collision course with bigger things." Red Sox manager Terry Francona lauded his bat speed, and compared his intensity and aggressiveness to that of former Red Sox right fielder Trot Nixon.

Kalish was promoted to the Red Sox from Pawtucket on July 31, 2010, and immediately began playing almost every day. At 22 years of age, he was the eighth-youngest ballplayer in the AL in 2010. He got his first major league hit in his first at bat, and later in the game notched his first RBI.

He was fast and aggressive on the basepaths. He finished the season with 10 steals—which led the Red Sox, and tied for the lead among AL rookies—in 11 attempts, including a steal of home on the back end of a double steal. But the raw aggression of his running game was evidenced on August 2, in a game against the Cleveland Indians, when Kalish came racing home from second base on a single to right field. The throw from right beat him to the plate, which Cleveland's rookie catcher Carlos Santana had blocked with his legs. Kalish attempted to slide through Santana's legs, sliding "cleanly" but violently into Santana's left knee, knocking him completely out of his left cleat. Santana was carted off the field with his knee in an air cast, and three days later had season-ending surgery to repair a torn lateral collateral ligament in the knee.

Kalish hit his first major league home run into the right-field bullpen at Yankee Stadium off Javier Vázquez, on August 6. On August 17, Kalish hit his first career grand slam off Jered Weaver, in a game against the Los Angeles Angels in Fenway Park. He then hit another grand slam on September 6 at Fenway Park against the Tampa Bay Rays, which tied a Red Sox rookie record, previously accomplished by Bob Zupcic in 1992. As of September 29, he was tied for second among American League rookies with 15 RBIs in September, and after his major league debut he was second among AL rookies with 16 extra-base hits, and tied for second with 23 RBIs. He was also patient at the plate, fourth among AL rookies in pitches-per-plate-appearance, at 4.16. While he batted .252 for the season, he batted .313 with two out and runners in scoring position, and .360 in games that were late and close.

He also made some sensational catches on defense, as he started most of his games in center field and a handful in left and right fields. Playing center field in late August, sprinting at full speed and then diving sideways he made an eye-opening, somersaulting catch of a ball in mid-air that concluded, as The Providence Journal described it, with him "tucking his elbow for an acrobatic, elegant landing on the Tropicana Field turf, looking like a character from the movie The Matrix" (see video). It was designated the best play in American sports for the night by ESPN's SportsCenter. He showed off his arm nabbing Coco Crisp at third base (see video), and made another spectacular, diving, rolling catch on September 26, against the Yankees (see video).

After the season, Kalish was voted the 2010 winner of the Harry Agganis Award as Red Sox Rookie of the Year, by the Boston chapter of the BBWAA.

==== 2011 ====
Bill James predicted that in 2011 Kalish would bat .271, with 20 home runs and 43 stolen bases. By comparison, James anticipated that Carl Crawford would steal one fewer base. J. P. Ricciardi, special assistant to the Mets general manager, predicted that Kalish will be "a star". Peter Gammons said during spring training that comparisons of Kalish and Trot Nixon may underestimate Kalish's potential:

I have great respect for Trot Nixon, but Ryan Kalish is a totally different athlete. He is a great athlete. I see him being a guy, he doesn’t swing and miss a lot, who's going to hit somewhere between .280 and .300, hit 25 home runs. He can run. I think he's going to be a really exciting player.

Through March 25, Kalish was leading the team in stolen bases in spring training, with 5, and tied for second in walks, with 6. However, as a result of the crowded Red Sox outfield resulting from the acquisition of Carl Crawford, the returns of Mike Cameron and Jacoby Ellsbury, and the presence of J. D. Drew, Kalish was optioned that day to start the season in Triple-A Pawtucket. He would suffer an injury crashing into the wall at McCoy Stadium in late April, causing him to miss the entire 2011 season, except for 8 games in August.

==== 2012 ====
Through July 7, 2012, Kalish hit .217 with no home runs and five RBIs. He was optioned to the Pawtucket Red Sox on July 7 to make room for fellow outfielder Ryan Sweeney.

==== 2013 ====
On January 29, 2013, Kalish underwent arthroscopic surgery in his right shoulder to repair a posterior labrum tear. As a result, Kalish missed all of spring training and began the 2013 season on the 60-day disabled list. In response, the Red Sox re-signed Ryan Sweeney, who had been non-tendered in December. (Sweeney was released following spring training and signed a minor league contract with the Chicago Cubs.)

Kalish underwent cervical fusion surgery in August, which included the removal of a disc in his neck, the use of his own bone to replace it, and the insertion of a metal plate to fuse it together. Kalish was told rehab would take 3–6 months. NFL quarterback Peyton Manning had a similar procedure. It was his fourth surgery in under two years.

In November, the Red Sox reinstated Kalish from the 60-day disabled list. On December 2, 2013, Kalish was non-tendered by the Red Sox, making him a free agent.

=== Chicago Cubs ===
==== 2014 ====
On December 13, 2013, Kalish signed a minor league deal with an invitation to spring training with the Chicago Cubs. On March 27, 2014, the team announced Kalish would be on the Cubs' opening day roster. Kalish hit .275 with 6 stolen bases in 7 attempts during spring training. He was sent down to Triple-A Iowa on August 8, so that he could have more at bats, and recalled in early September.

In 2014, Kalish batted .248 in 121 at bats, playing all three outfield positions. He cleared waivers and was sent to Iowa outright in October, which removed him from the Cubs' 40-man roster. On November 1, Kalish declined the assignment to Iowa, making him a free agent.

On December 17, 2014, Kalish signed a minor league contract with the Toronto Blue Jays organization that included and invitation to major league spring training. On January 9, 2015, it was announced that the deal had fallen through for unknown reasons, and Kalish returned to free agency.

==== 2016 ====
On March 6, 2016, Kalish signed a minor league contract with the Chicago Cubs. He was assigned to the Triple-A Iowa Cubs to begin the 2016 season. The Cubs purchased his Iowa contract on May 3, and he was brought up to the major league teams's 25-man roster.

On May 7, 2016, Kalish entered a game against the Washington Nationals as a pinch hitter in the 6th inning. With the bases loaded, two outs, and the Nationals leading 4 to 3, Kalish hit a two-run single to left field to give the Cubs the lead. The Cubs went on to win the game 8 to 5. He hit .286 for the Cubs in seven games. On May 14, the Cubs designated him for assignment; on May 15, they announced that Kalish had cleared waivers and had been sent to the Triple-A Iowa Cubs. He batted .368/.471/.509 for Iowa in 21 games. In July Kalish went on the disabled list with a knee injury and planned to undergo surgery; he anticipated that recovery would take a year, and that he would be unable to play until mid-2017.

Kalish was re-signed to a minor league deal with the Cubs on April 4, 2017. Kalish elected free agency following the season on November 6, 2017.

== Personal life ==
Since 2018, Kalish is a co-owner of Birdman Bats, a manufacturer of wooden baseball bats, along with former Red Sox teammate Lars Anderson.

As of mid-2025, Kalish resides in Thailand and is a real estate investor in Indonesia.

== See also ==
- List of Jewish Major League Baseball players
