= Mid-Plains League =

American collegiate baseball league

- Sport: Baseball
- Founded: 2014
- No. of teams: 6
- Country: United States
- Most recent champion: Junction City Brigade (2024)
- Most titles: Junction City Brigade (8)
- Website: www.midplainsleague.com

The Mid-Plains League is a collegiate summer baseball league comprising teams of the top college players from North America and beyond. Players are not paid, to maintain their college eligibility. Teams are run similarly to a professional minor league team, allowing players to play under the same conditions, using wooden bats and NCAA specification baseballs.

Teams play 36 games over a 44-day season that runs from early June to mid-July. The winner of the postseason playoffs will be named the Mid-Plains League champion and claim the Brett Cowdin Memorial Cup.

== Teams ==
Mid-Plains League
Team	Location	Stadium
Baldwin City Blues	Baldwin City, Kansas	Baldwin City Ballpark
Topeka Warhawks	Topeka, Kansas	Hummer Sports Park
Midwest Athletics	Belton, Missouri	Belton High School Field
Kansas City Monarchs	Independence, MO	Capitol Federal Sports Complex
Bravos	Leavenworth, Kansas	SportsField Park
Farmers	Leavenworth, Kansas	SportsField Park

== Historical standings ==
=== 2014 ===
Team	W-L	Win%	Playoffs
Topeka Golden Giants	24-10	.706	Lost in Championship
Junction City Brigade	26-10	.722	Won Championship
Midwest Athletics	17-16	.5515	5th Place
Baldwin City Blues	15-17	.468	6th Place
Topeka Senators	11-23	.324	3rd Place
Rossville Rattlers	9-24	.273	4th Place

=== 2015 ===
Team	W-L	Win%	Playoffs
Midwest Athletics	24-15	.615	Lost in Championship
Junction City Brigade	23-16	.590	Lost in semi-finals
Rossville Rattlers	23-16	.590	Won Championship
Topeka Golden Giants	20-18	.526	Lost first round
Liberty Monarchs	14-20	.412	Lost in semi-finals
Baldwin City Blues	15-24	.385	Lost first round
Topeka Senators	9-25	.265	Missed Playoffs

=== 2019 ===
Team	W-L	Win %	Playoffs
Junction City Brigade	21-5	.807	Won Championship
Midwest A's	19-7	.731	Lost Championship
Topeka Golden Giants	15-11	.577	Lost semifinal round
Kansas City Knights	15-11	.577	Lost semifinal round
Kansas City Monarchs	9-5	.600	N/A
Baldwin City Blues	8-18	.307	Lost quarterfinal round
Liberty Monarchs	7-19	.269	Lost Play-In
Sabetha Bravos	4-22	.154	Lost quarterfinal round

=== 2020 ===
Team	W-L	Win %	Playoffs
Midwest A's	21-8	.724	Won Championship
Sabetha Bravos	16-11	.592	Lost Championship
Topeka Golden Giants	14-14	.500	Lost semifinal round
Baldwin City Blues	15-11	.200	Lost semifinal round

=== 2021 ===
Team	W-L	Win %	Playoffs
Junction City Brigade	19-9	.679	Won Championship
Sabetha Bravos	19-9	.679	Lost semifinal round
Midwest A's	17-11	.607	Lost Championship
Topeka Golden Giants	14-17	.452	Lost quarterfinal round
Baldwin City Blues	11-19	.367	Lost semifinal round
Lawrence Travellers	9-21	.300	Lost quarterfinal round

=== 2022 ===
Team	W-L	Win %	Playoffs
Junction City Brigade			Won Championship

=== 2023 ===
Team	W-L	Win %	Playoffs
Junction City Brigade	22-3	.880	Won Championship
Topeka Warhawks	16-10	.615	
Midwest A's	16-10	.615	Lost Championship
Bravos	15-11	.577	
Baldwin City Blues	10-16	.385	
Farmers	6-19	.240	
KC Monarchs	12-2	.857	

== Champions ==
Season	Brett Cowdin Memorial Cup	Runner-up	Result
2014	Junction City Brigade	Topeka Golden Giants	Round-robin
2015	Rossville Rattlers	Midwest A's	5-2 (10 innings)
2016	Junction City Brigade	Midwest A's	
2017	Topeka Golden Giants	Junction City Brigade	
2018	Junction City Brigade	Topeka Golden Giants	2-1 (Best of 3)
2019	Junction City Brigade	Midwest A's	2-0 (Best of 3)
2020	Midwest A's	Sabetha Bravos	2-0 (Best of 3)
2021	Junction City Brigade		
2022	Junction City Brigade		
2023	Junction City Brigade	Midwest A's	2-0 (Best of 3)
2024	Junction City Brigade	Topeka Warhawks	2-0 (Best of 3)

== Awards ==
Season	Player of the Year	"Conner Taylor" Pitcher of the Year	Manager of the Year						
2014	Brett Nickle, Junction City Brigade	Dalton Shalberg, Junction City Brigade	John Tetuan, Topeka Golden Giants						
2015	Ethan Klosterboer, Junction City Brigade	Tyler Davis, Rossville Rattlers	Tobi Cowdin, Rossville Ratters						
2016									
2017									
2018	Dylan Phillips, Topeka Golden Giants	Dalen Blair, Midwest A's	Derek Francis, Junction City Brigade						
2019	Dusty Stroup, Midwest A's	Zach Pratt, Midwest A's	Derek Francis, Junction City Brigade						
2020	Garrett Pennington, Midwest A's	Zach Pratt, Midwest A's							
2021	MPL CHAMPS: Junction City Brigade Price Allman, Junction City Brigade	Brandon Bachar, Junction City Brigade	2022	MPL CHAMPS: Junction City Brigade Gehrig Goldbeck, Junction City Brigade	Brandon Bachar, Junction City Brigade	2023	Kuyper Kendall, Baldwin City Blues	Charlie Williams, Midwest A's	Tanner Kilmer, Baldwin City Blues
2024	Jack Harris, Midwest A's	Jaryd White, Topeka Warhawks							
