= 100 Neediest Cases =

The 100 Neediest Cases is an annual charitable campaign jointly sponsored by the St. Louis Post-Dispatch and the local chapter of the United Way. The campaign selects 100 families and individuals that are profiled in the Post-Dispatch during November and December. Local students participate in contests for the selection of companion illustrations in the profiles. The sponsoring organizations and other charities absorb the administrative cost. Local organizations adopts individual cases, donating food, medications, household necessities, and holiday presents etc. for the 100 beneficiaries of the campaign.

The campaign also facilitates the adoption by local organizations of about 1,200 additional cases that are not featured in the newspaper. This is about ten percent of the annual total of meritorious cases that are identified and compiled by local social service agencies.

The campaign began in 1922. The Post-Dispatch began profiling the "100 neediest" cases in the mid-1950s and the name was born. The name parallels similar campaigns in other cities, such as the "neediest cases" campaign sponsored by The New York Times every holiday season.
