= National Amateur Baseball Federation =

The National Amateur Baseball Federation (NABF) is a nonprofit organization that serves as a governing body for amateur baseball in the United States. The organization was founded in Louisville, Kentucky in 1914 and is the oldest continually-operated national amateur baseball organization in the United States.

The NABF holds over 50 regional championship and eight national championship tournaments at various skill levels and age groups, ranging from 10 and under youth, teen, summer collegiate, senior, and major.

== World series tournaments ==
See footnote

- Rookie World Series (10U)
- Freshman World Series (12&U)
- Sophomore World Series (14&U)
- Junior World Series (16&U)
- High School World Series (17&U)
- Senior World Series (18&U)
- College World Series (22&U)
- Major World Series (unlimited)

== See also ==
- Baseball awards#U.S. amateur baseball
- Baseball awards#U.S. youth baseball
- Baseball awards#U.S. collegiate summer baseball
