= W. japonica =

W. japonica may refer to:

- Wasabia japonica, the wasabi or Japanese horseradish, a plant species
- Weigela japonica, a flowering plant species in the genus Weigela
- Wisteriopsis japonica, a flowering plant species
- Woodwardia japonica, a fern species in the genus Woodwardia

== See also ==
- Japonica (disambiguation)
