= Eigel =

Eigel is a surname. Notable people with the surname include:

- Bill Eigel, American politician
- Hanna Eigel (born 1939), Austrian figure skater
- Pavel Eigel (born 1990), Russian slalom canoeist

== See also ==
- Eigil
- Engel (surname)
- Veigel
- Weigel
