= Weigel =

Weigel is a German surname. Notable people with this name include:

- Ada Weigel Powers (1863–1947), American composer
- Alicia Roth Weigel, American intersex activist
- Beverly Weigel (born 1940), New Zealand athlete
- Christian Ehrenfried Weigel (1748–1831), German scientist and academic
- Christoph Weigel the Elder (1654–1725), German engraver, art dealer and publisher
- Dana Weigel, American mechanical engineer at NASA
- David Weigel (born 1981), American journalist and blogger
- Detlef Weigel (born 1961), German-American biologist
- Elvira Weigel (1927–1995), née Hofer, Austrian actress, married to Hans Weigel from 1951–1964
- Erhard Weigel (1625–1699), German mathematician, astronomer and philosopher
- Estelle Weigel (1914–1967), American figure skater
- François Weigel (born 1964), French pianist, conductor and composer
- Fredric Weigel (born 1992), Swedish ice hockey player
- George Weigel (born 1951), American Catholic author and activist
- Hans Weigel (1908–1991), Austrian writer and theater critic
- Hans-Ulrich Weigel (born 1944), German songwriter
- Heinz Weigel (born 1938), German rower
- Helene Weigel (1900–1971), Austrian actress and artistic director
- Herman Weigel (born 1950), German film producer and screenwriter
- Jannine Weigel (born 2000), Thai actress, singer and host
- Jaroslav Weigel (1931–2019), Czech actor, writer and painter
- Jay Weigel, American musician
- Jenniffer Weigel (born 1970), American radio and television personality
- Johanna Weigel (1847–1940), Australian paper-pattern manufacturer
- Julian Weigel (born 2001), German footballer
- Keith Weigel (born 1955), American politician from Iowa
- Kurt Weigel (born 1950), German Catholic priest]] and hymn writer
- Lee Weigel (born 1963), American football player
- Louise Weigel (1912–1982), American figure skater, sister of Estelle Weigel
- Maren Weigel (born 1994), German handball player
- María José Weigel (born 1992), Chilean-French lawyer and actress
- Matthew James Weigel, Canadian writer and artist
- Patrick Weigel (born 1994), American baseball player
- Paul Weigel (1867–1951), American actor
- Paul Weigel (architect) (1889–1984), American architect and academic
- Rafer Weigel (born 1969), American broadcast journalist
- Ralph Weigel (1921–1992), American baseball player
- Ronald Weigel (born 1959), German athlete
- Sigrid Weigel (born 1950), German literary scholar
- Stanley Alexander Weigel (1905–1999), American judge from California
- Susi Weigel (1914–1990), Austrian illustrator
- Teri Weigel (born 1961/2), American pornographic actress and model
- Tim Weigel (1945–2001), American broadcaster
- Tom Weigel (1948–2017), American poet and artist
- Valentin Weigel (1533–1588), German theologian, philosopher and mystical writer
- Virgil Weigel (born 1953), American politician from Kansas
- William Weigel (1863–1936), United States Army general

== See also ==
- Grote & Weigel, American meat company
- Weigel Motors, British maker of automobiles (1907–10)
- Weigel Broadcasting, an American broadcasting company
- Weigl, surname
- Weigle, surname
