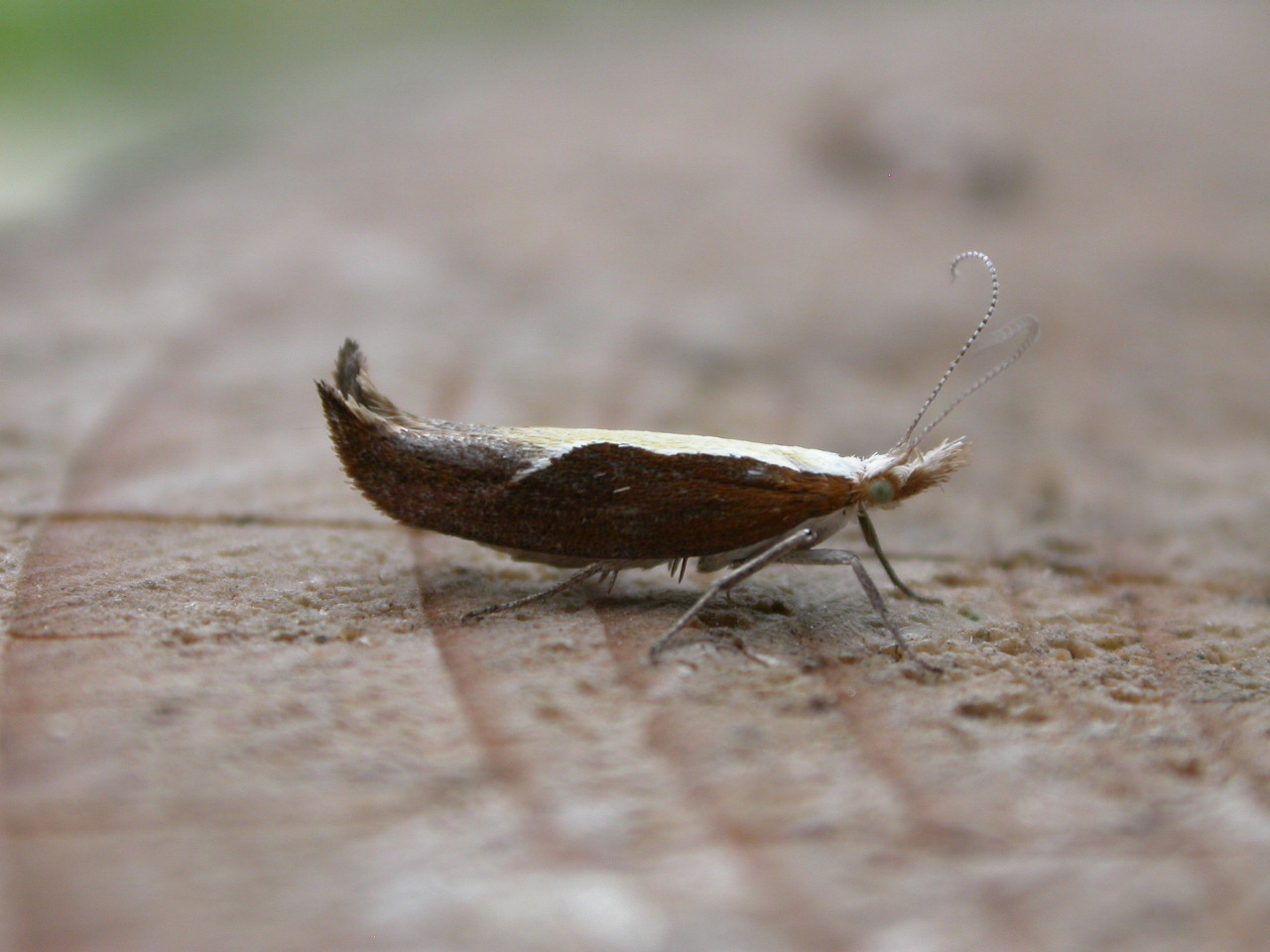

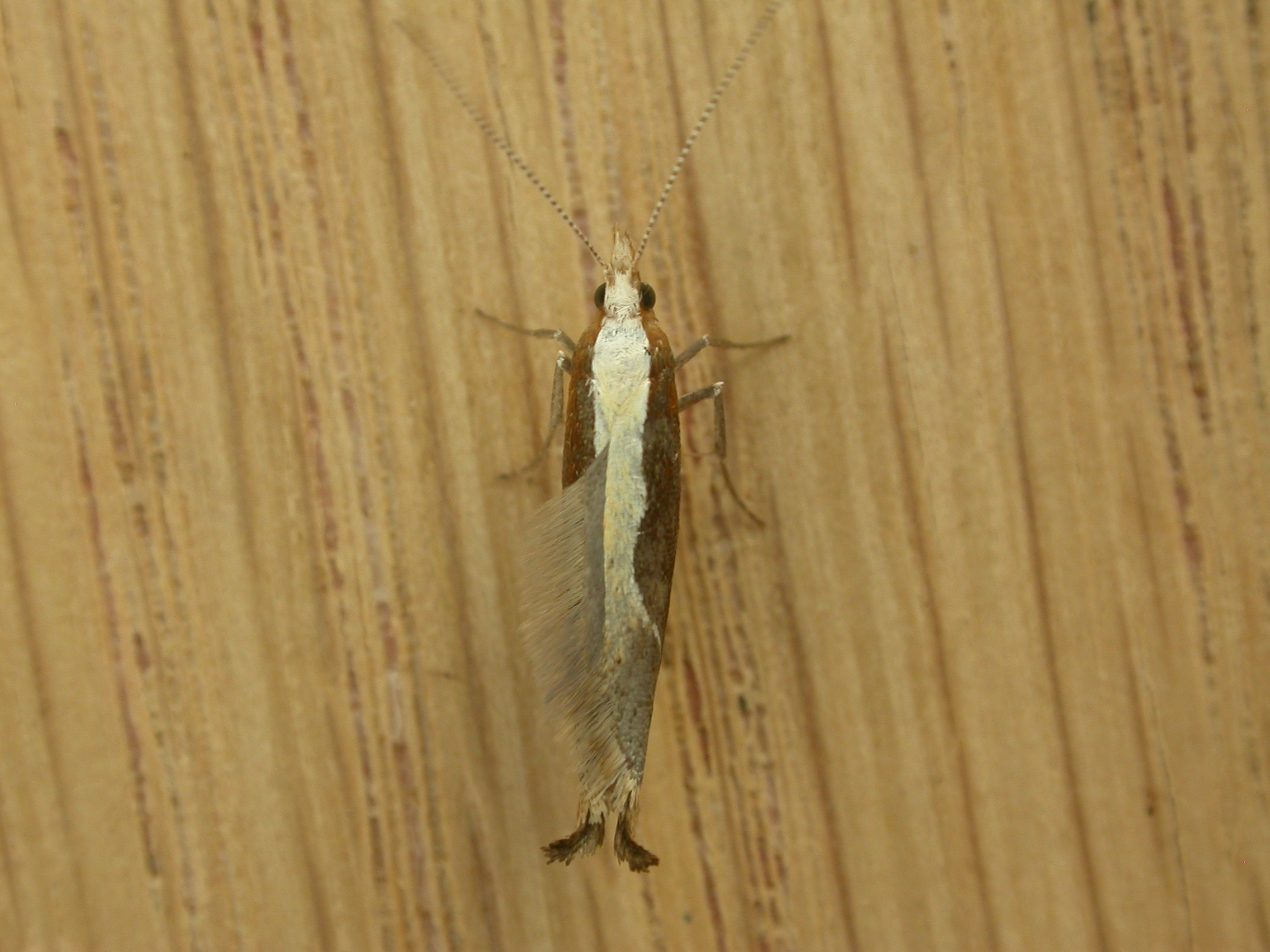

Scientific classification
- Kingdom: Animalia
- Phylum: Arthropoda
- Class: Insecta
- Order: Lepidoptera
- Family: Ypsolophidae
- Genus: Ypsolopha
- Species: Y. dentella

Binomial name
- Ypsolopha dentella (Fabricius, 1775)

Synonyms
- Alucita dentella Fabricius, 1775; Phalaena (Tinea) dentella; Tinea harpella Denis & Schiffermuller, 1775; Cerostoma affinitella Staudinger, 1892

= Ypsolopha dentella =

Species of moth

Ypsolopha dentella, the honeysuckle moth, is a moth of the family Ypsolophidae. It is found in Europe, Anatolia, north-eastern China, Russia and mideast Asia. It is also present in North America, where it is known from the eastern United States and southern Canada.

The wingspan is 18–23 mm. The head and thorax are white, patagia deep brown. Forewings with apex very strongly falcate; deep ochreous-brown, lighter towards costa anteriorly; a light yellow dorsal streak from base to tornus, edged above by a fine white line which is posteriorly bent obliquely upwards to disc at 2/3. Hindwings are rather dark grey. The larva is pale yellowish-green; dorsal stripe broad, brown-reddish.

The moth flies from June to September depending on the location.

The larvae feed on honeysuckle, Symphoricarpos albus and Weigela.

== Gallery ==
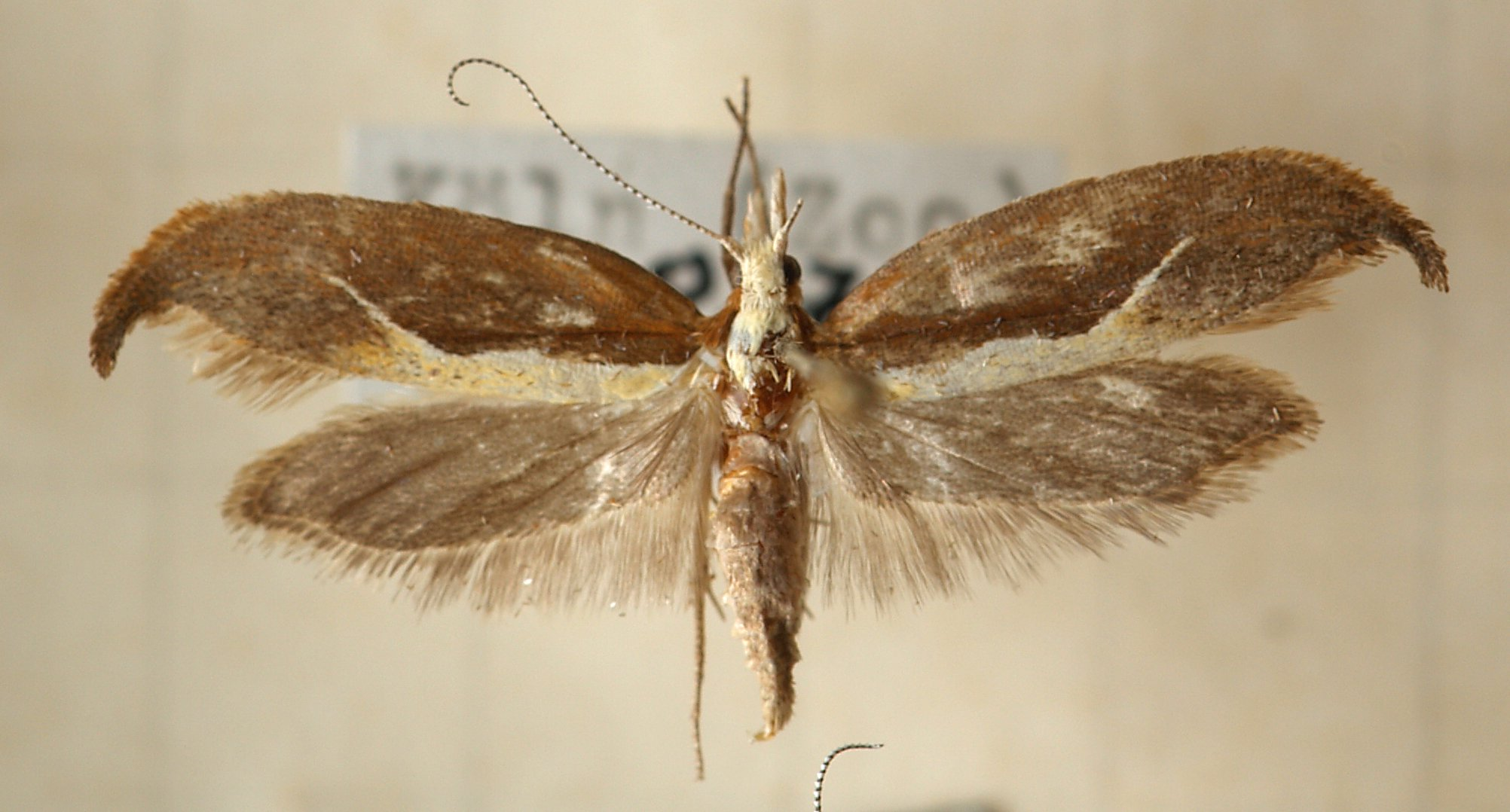
Mounted specimen

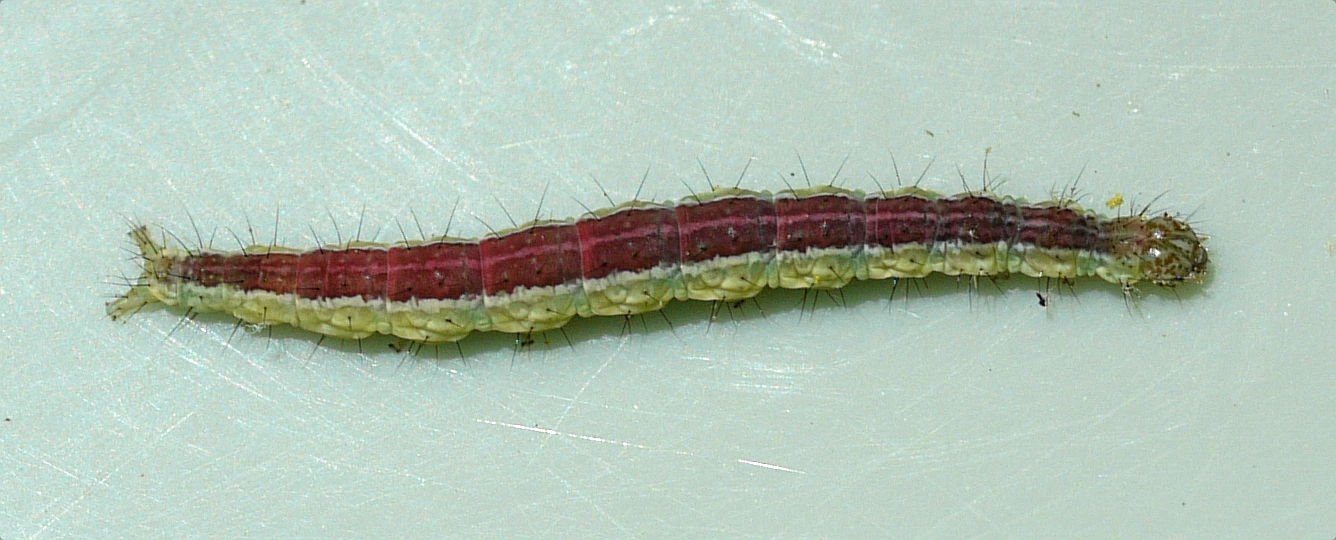
Larva

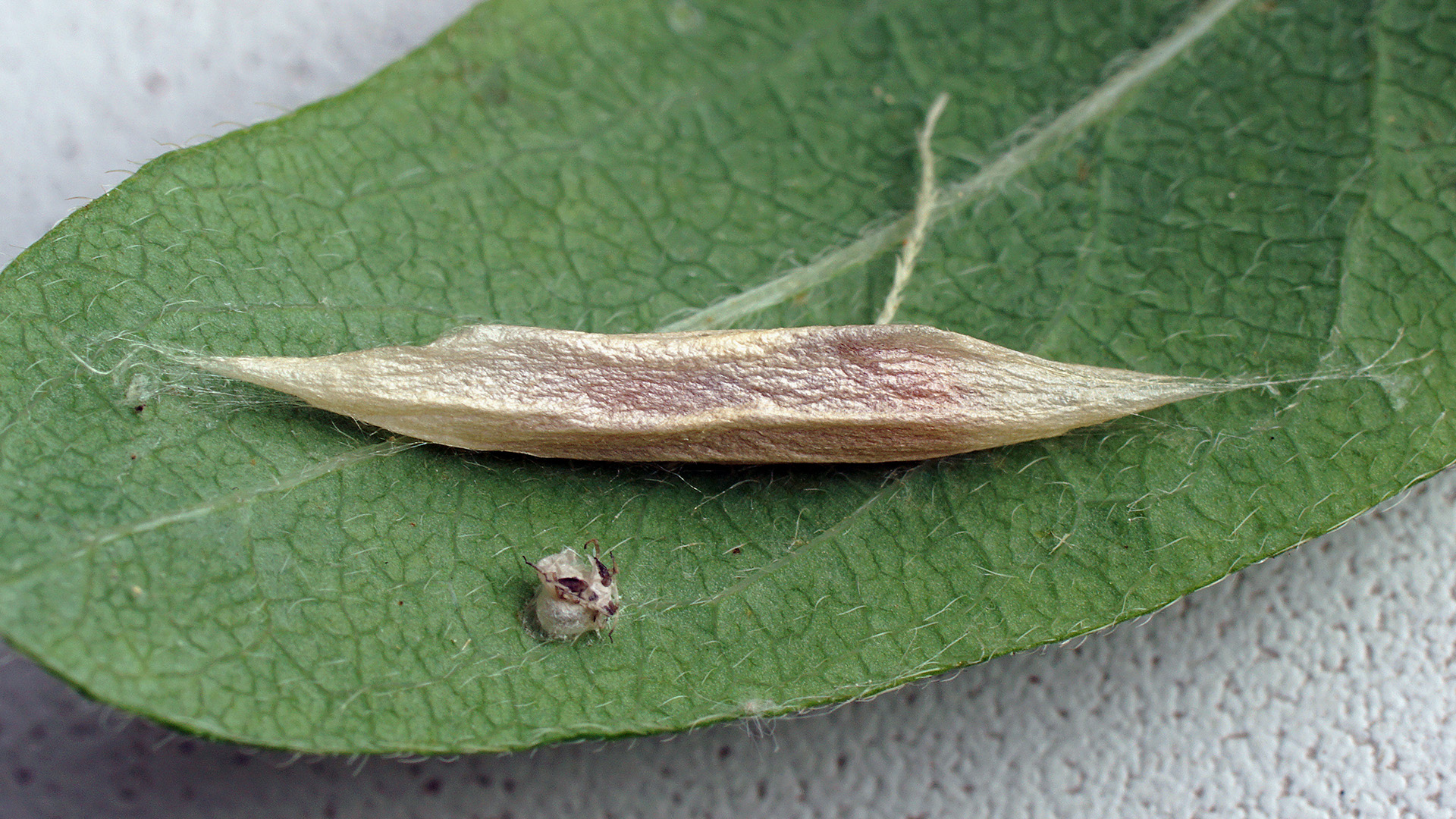
Cocoon
