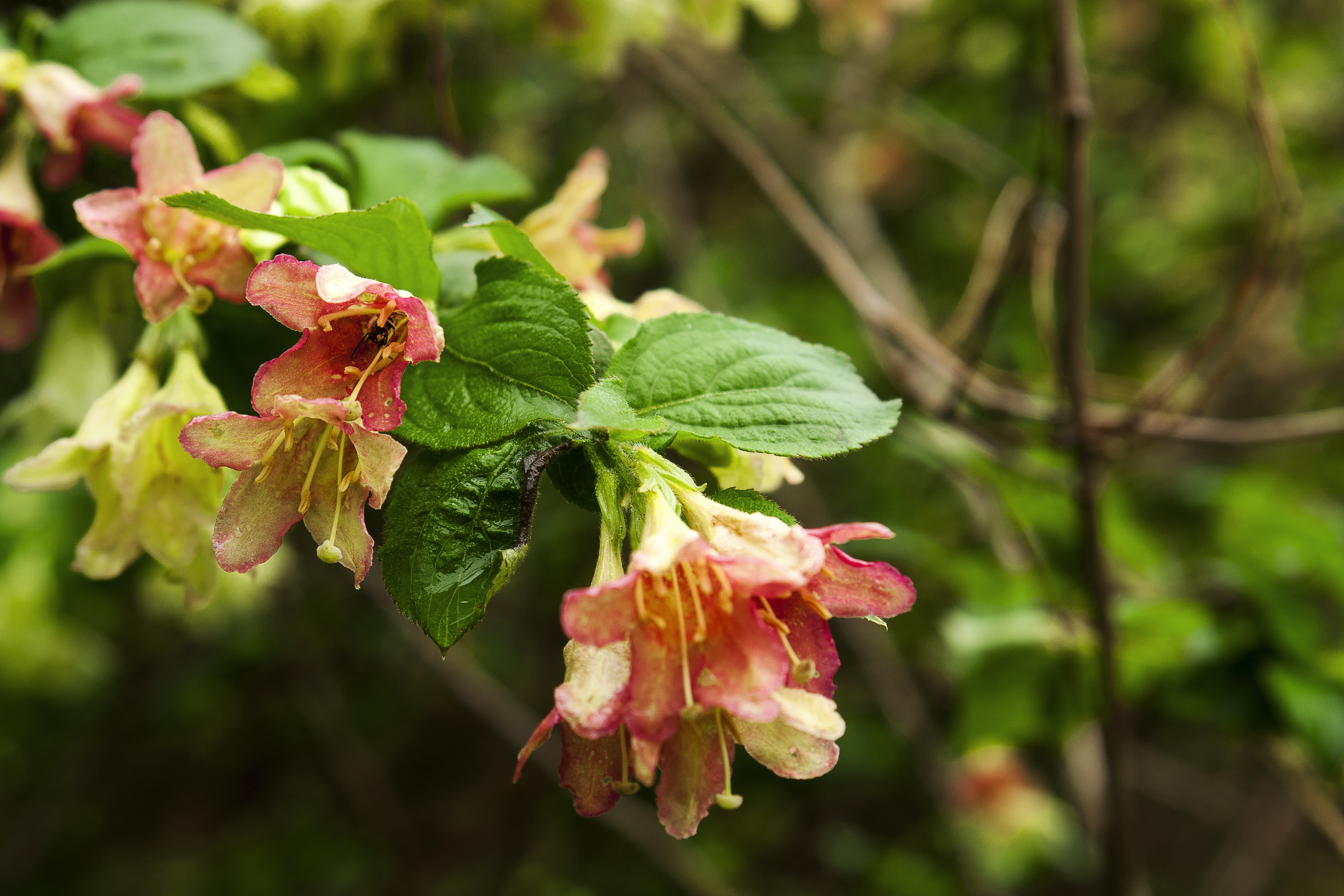

Conservation status
- Least Concern (IUCN 3.1)

Scientific classification
- Kingdom: Plantae
- Clade: Tracheophytes
- Clade: Angiosperms
- Clade: Eudicots
- Clade: Asterids
- Order: Dipsacales
- Family: Caprifoliaceae
- Genus: Weigela
- Species: W. subsessilis

Binomial name
- Weigela subsessilis (Nakai) L.H.Bailey

Synonyms
- Diervilla subsessilis Nakai

= Weigela subsessilis =

Species of flowering plant

Weigela subsessilis, the Korean weigela, is a species of flowering plant in the honeysuckle family native to the Korean Peninsula. It can be found on most of the mountains of Korea, except for the northern sides because the temperatures are very low. As the species is highly resistant to shade, cold, salt and even pollution, it is also found in deep forests or near the seas.

== Etymology ==
The genus name, Weigela, is named after the German scientist Christian Ehrenfried Weigel. The species epithet, subsessilis, is from the term subsessile, which means "nearly, but not quite sessile." The root, sessilis is derived from Latin, which means low, dwarf in plants.

A cultivar with buttery-yellow flowers is known as "Canary Weigela".

The Korean name of the species is '병꽃나무' (byeongkkot-namu), which means "bottle-flower tree." In 1918, the Japanese botanist Nakai gave it this name, as the flowers seemed to look like plain, traditional Korean bottles, which were usually made from gourds.

== Description ==
Weigela subsessilis is a deciduous, broad-leaved, shrubs, which grows from 2~3 meters tall. The species usually coexists with azaleas or royal azaleas, or sometimes clusters itself. It prefers sandy soil, which helps them survive also in barren land.

=== Foliage ===
The leaves of Weigela subsessilis has an opposite leaf arrangement, and has a wide egg-shaped body with a sharp tip. The width are up to 2 inches, while the length are up to 3 inches. The leaves have hair on each sides, and the ones on the bottom has spread hair on the leaf veins. It usually does not have petioles, and the edges are slightly toothed.

=== Flower and fruit ===
The flowers are produced on new growth from second-year wood as the leaves are expanding. Each inflorescence consists of clusters of three or four, even up to six flowers. When fully open, the flowers measure between 2.5 and 3.5 cm in length. As the flower buds enlarge, they assume a yellowish-green color that gradually changes through various shades of pink to a pale lavender when the flowers are in full bloom. Since inflorescences are profuse and individual flowers represent different stages of maturation, the overall effect of the shrub is a unique combination of pastel colors from pale yellowish-green to lavender. The flowers usually bloom in late April to May, and the sepals are separated to the end.

The fruits ripe in November to October, which is a capsule fruit which has short hair and is 10~15mm long. The seeds in the fruit has developed wings.
