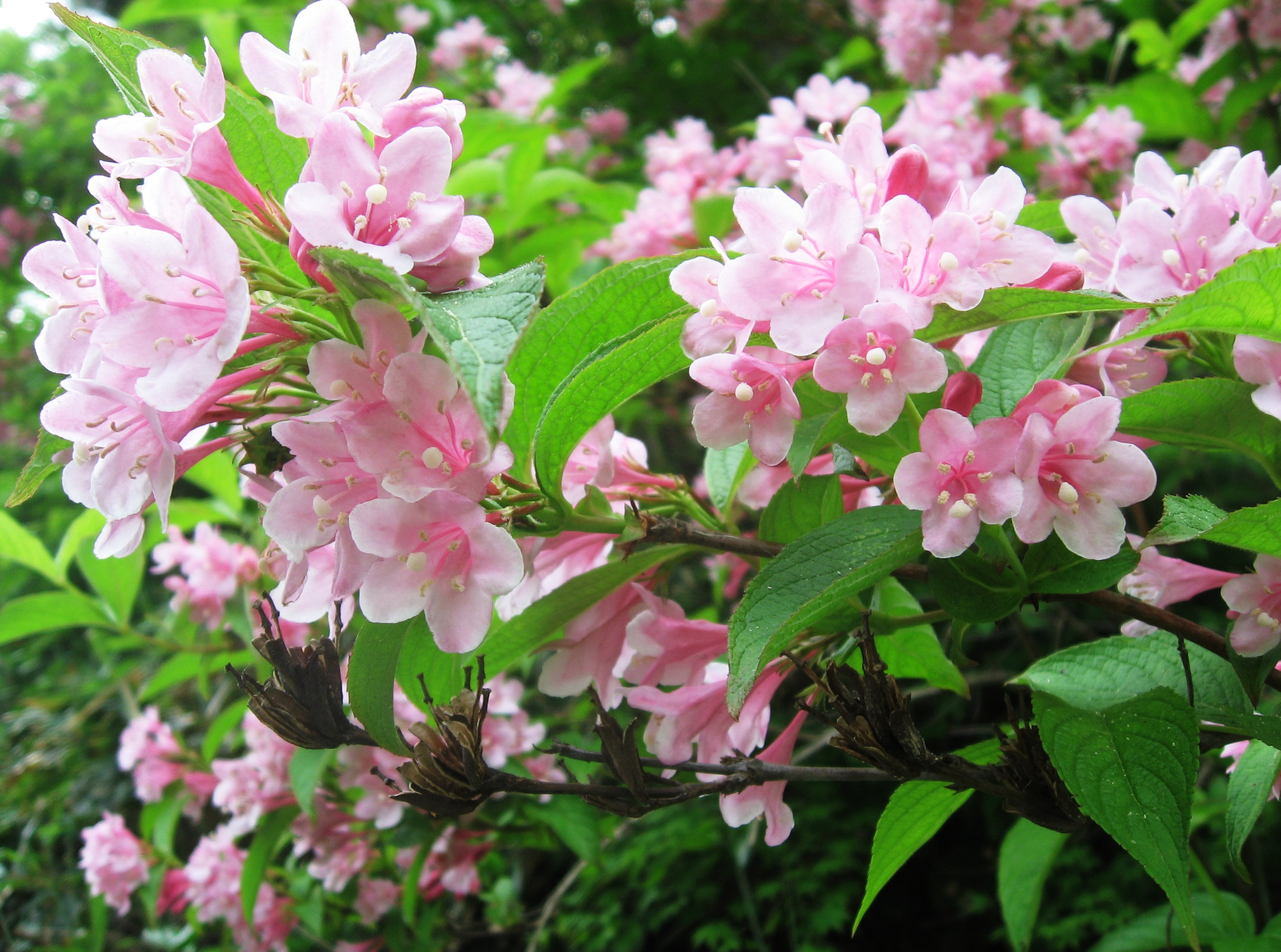
- In bloom in Aizu, Japan
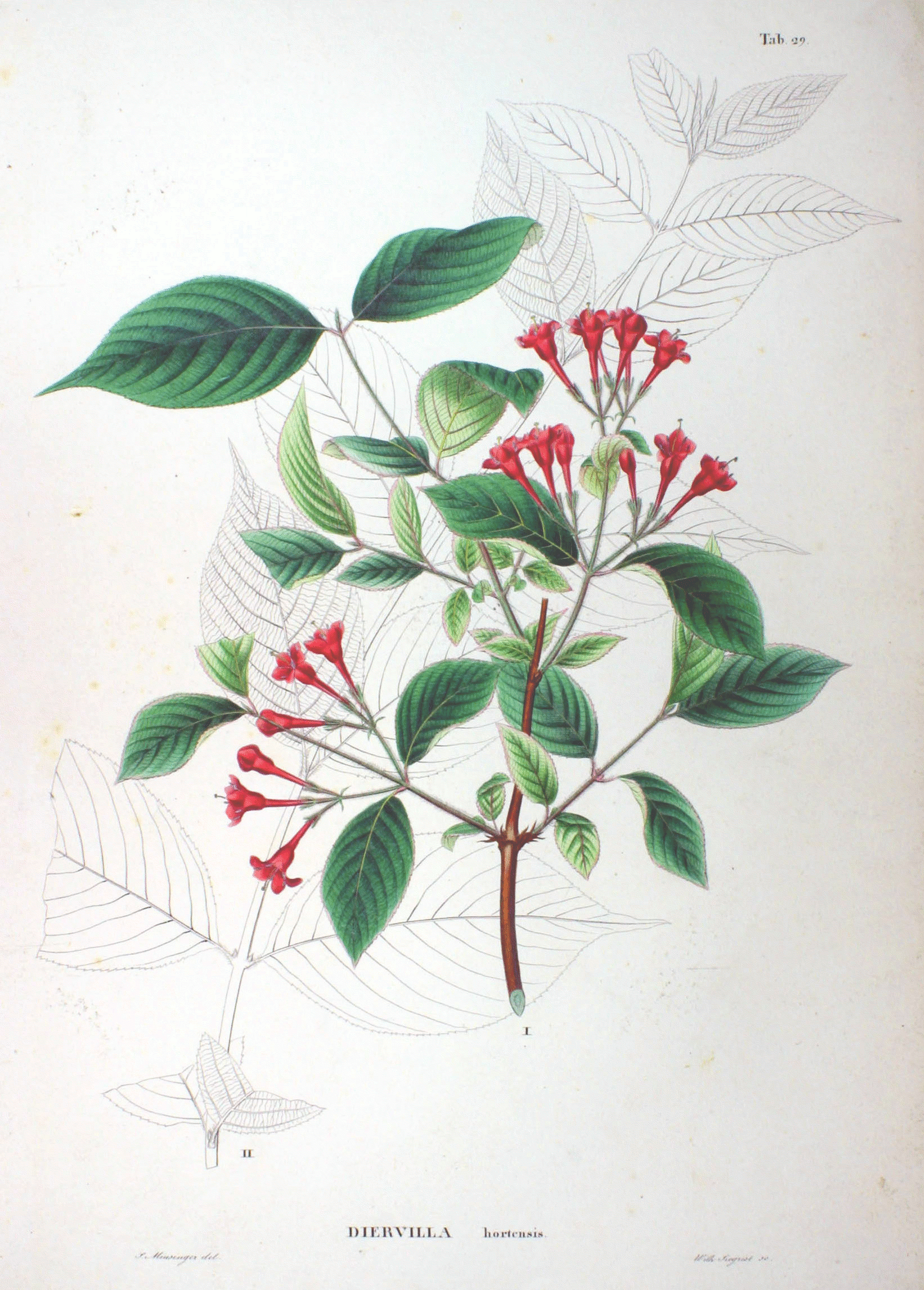
- Botanical illustration

Scientific classification
- Kingdom: Plantae
- Clade: Embryophytes
- Clade: Tracheophytes
- Clade: Angiosperms
- Clade: Eudicots
- Clade: Asterids
- Order: Dipsacales
- Family: Caprifoliaceae
- Genus: Weigela
- Species: W. hortensis

Binomial name
- Weigela hortensis (Siebold & Zucc.) K.Koch

Synonyms
- Diervilla hortensis Siebold & Zucc.

= Weigela hortensis =

Species of flowering plant

Weigela hortensis is a species of flowering plant in the family Caprifoliaceae, native to Hokkaido and Honshu islands of Japan. A rounded shrub reaching 10 ft (3 m), and hardy in USDA zones 6 through 9, it is occasionally found in commerce.
