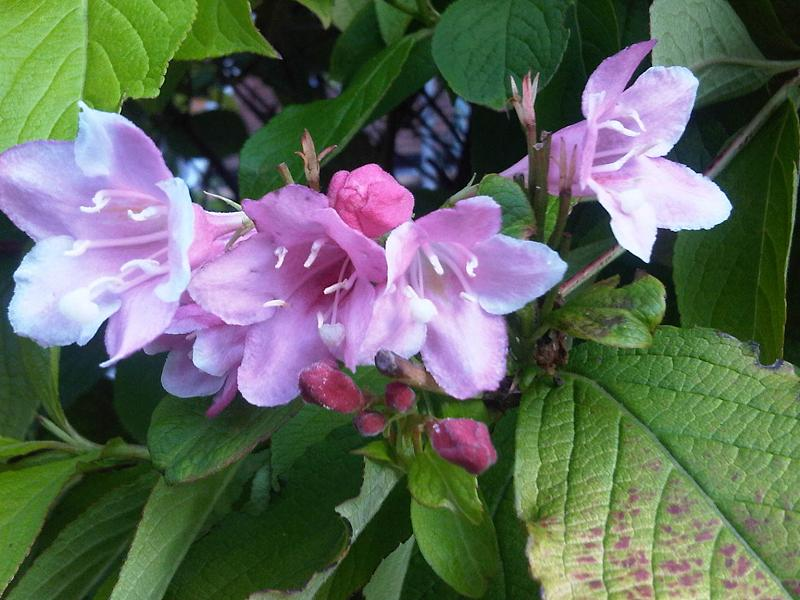
- Flowers at Kew Gardens
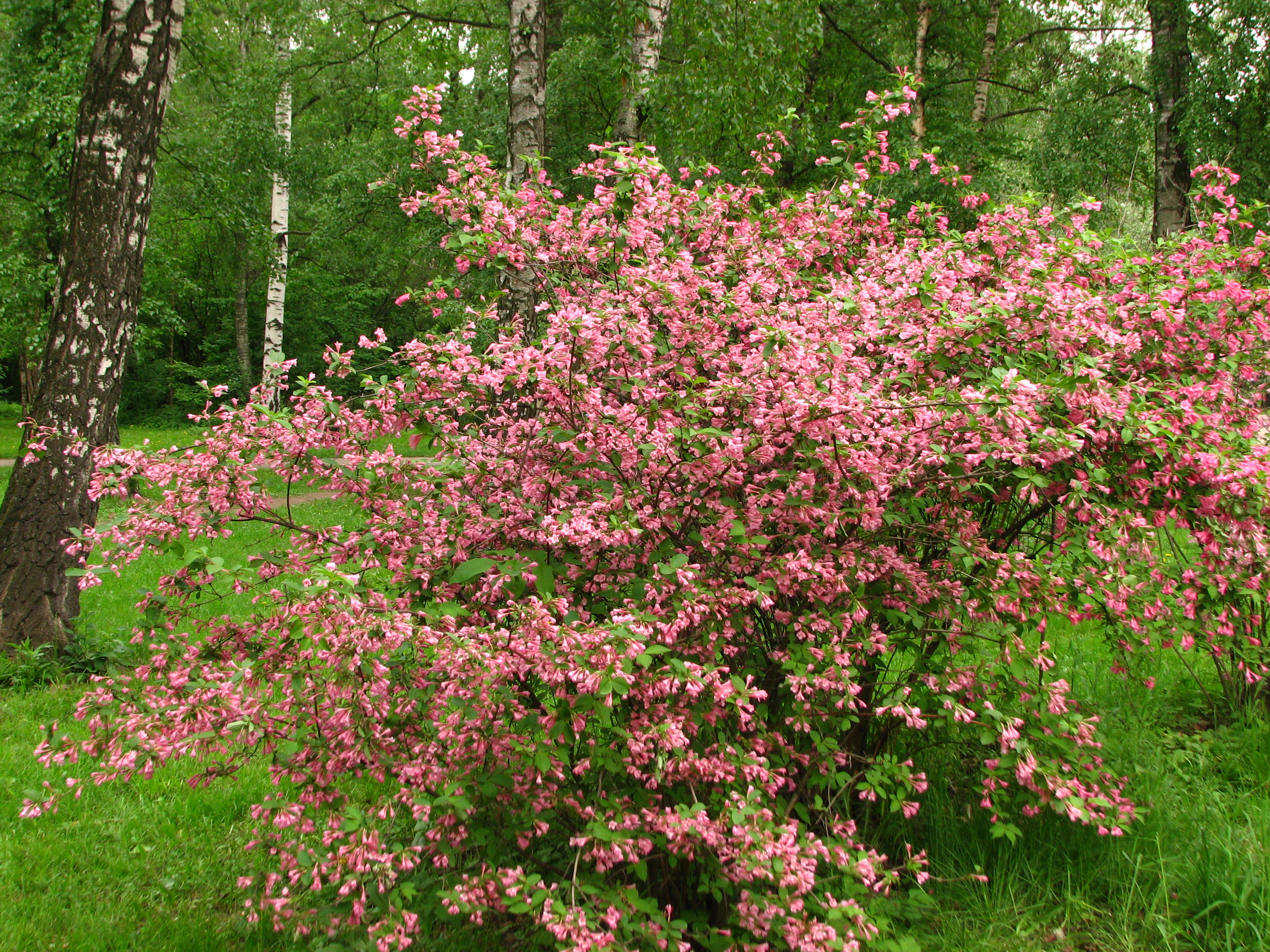
- A large specimen at the Moscow Botanical Garden of Academy of Sciences

Scientific classification
- Kingdom: Plantae
- Clade: Tracheophytes
- Clade: Angiosperms
- Clade: Eudicots
- Clade: Asterids
- Order: Dipsacales
- Family: Caprifoliaceae
- Genus: Weigela
- Species: W. florida

Binomial name
- Weigela florida (Bunge) A.DC.

Synonyms
- List: Calysphyrum floridum Bunge; Calysphyrum pauciflorum Bunge; Calysphyrum roseum (Lindl.) C.A.Mey.; Diervilla brevicalycina Nakai; Diervilla florida (Bunge) Siebold & Zucc.; Diervilla florida f. alba Nakai; Diervilla florida f. alba Rehder; Diervilla florida f. brevicalycina (Nakai) Nakai; Diervilla florida var. candida (Voss) Rehder; Diervilla florida f. candida Voss; Diervilla florida var. pilosa Nakai; Diervilla florida var. variegata Bean; Diervilla florida var. venusta Rehder; Diervilla pauciflora (A.DC.) Carrière; Diervilla praecox Lemoine; Diervilla praecox var. tomentosa Nakai; Diervilla rosea (Lindl.) Hérincq; Diervilla venusta (Rehder) Stapf; Lonicera weigelia E.H.L.Krause; Weigela alba Carrière; Weigela amabilis var. alba (Carrière) H.Jaeger; Weigela florida f. alba (Carrière) Rehder; Weigela florida f. alba (Nakai) C.F.Fang; Weigela florida var. alba (Nakai) K.S.Hao; Weigela florida f. albida Nakai; Weigela florida f. albiflora Y.C.Chu; Weigela florida f. brevicalycina (Nakai) Uyeki; Weigela florida f. candida (Voss) Rehder; Weigela florida var. glabra Nakai; Weigela florida f. leucantha Nakai; Weigela florida var. pauciflora (A.DC.) Nakai; Weigela florida var. praecox (Lemoine) Y.C.Chu; Weigela florida f. subtricolor Nakai; Weigela florida f. toensis (Nakai) M.Kim; Weigela florida f. variegata (Bean) Rehder; Weigela florida var. variegata (Bean) L.H.Bailey; Weigela florida var. venusta (Rehder) Nakai; Weigela isolinae Van Houtte; Weigela pauciflora A.DC.; Weigela praecox (Lemoine) L.H.Bailey; Weigela praecox f. albiflora (Y.C.Chu) C.F.Fang; Weigela praecox var. pilosa (Nakai) Nakai; Weigela praecox var. tomentosa (Nakai) Nakai; Weigela purpurata Verschaff.; Weigela rosea Lindl.; Weigela rosea alba (Carrière) T.Moore; Weigela rosea stelzneri Jacob-Makoy; Weigela rosea variegata J.R.Duncan & V.C.Davies; Weigela stelzneri Van Houtte; Weigela toensis Nakai; Weigela venusta (Rehder) L.H.Bailey

= Weigela florida =

Species of plant

Weigela florida (syn. Weigela praecox), the old-fashioned weigela, is a species of flowering plant in the family Caprifoliaceae. It is native to Inner Mongolia, Manchuria, northern and south-central China, Primorsky Krai in the Russian Far East, the Korean Peninsula, and Kyushu in Japan, and it has been introduced to Bulgaria, Great Britain, Ireland, the United States, and Uzbekistan. A deciduous shrub reaching 2.5 m (8 ft), it is typically found in scrublands and mixed evergreen/deciduous forests, at elevations from 100 to 1,500 m (300 to 4,900 ft) above sea level. Recommended for screens and hedges, and attractive to hummingbirds, it is cold hardy in USDA zones 4 through 8, and requires full sun.

== Cultivars ==
Many cultivars and hybrids have been developed from Weigela florida. The cultivars 'Alexandra' (trade designation Wine & Roses) and 'Florida Variegata' have gained the Royal Horticultural Society's Award of Garden Merit. Other cultivars that are widely available from commercial suppliers include 'Foliis Purpureis', 'Kolmagira' (Magical Rainbow), 'Nana Variegata', 'Olympiade' (Briant Rubidor), 'Pink Poppet', 'Verweig' (Monet), 'Verweig 3' (Minor Black), and 'Wings of Fire'.

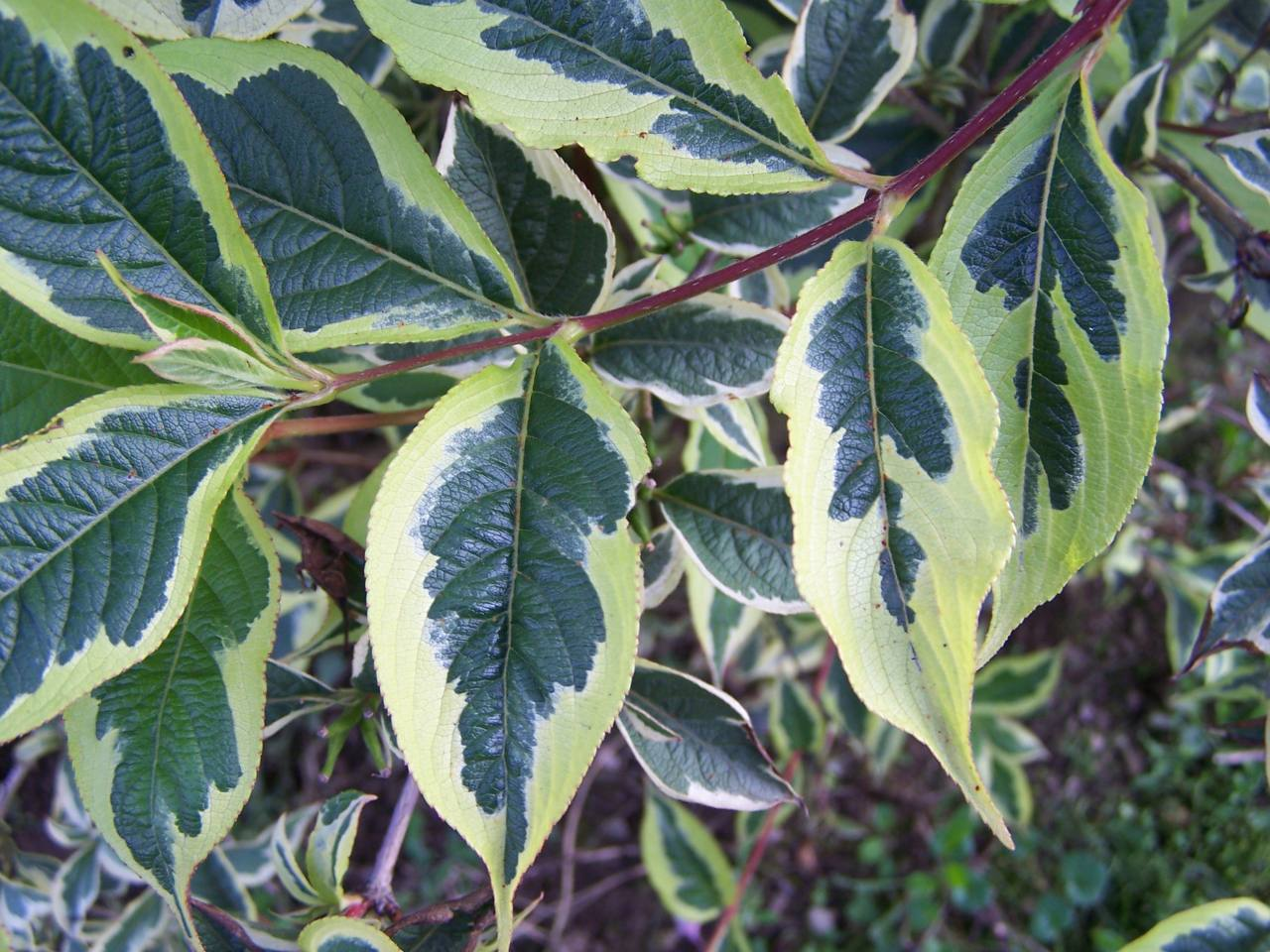
Variegated leaves
