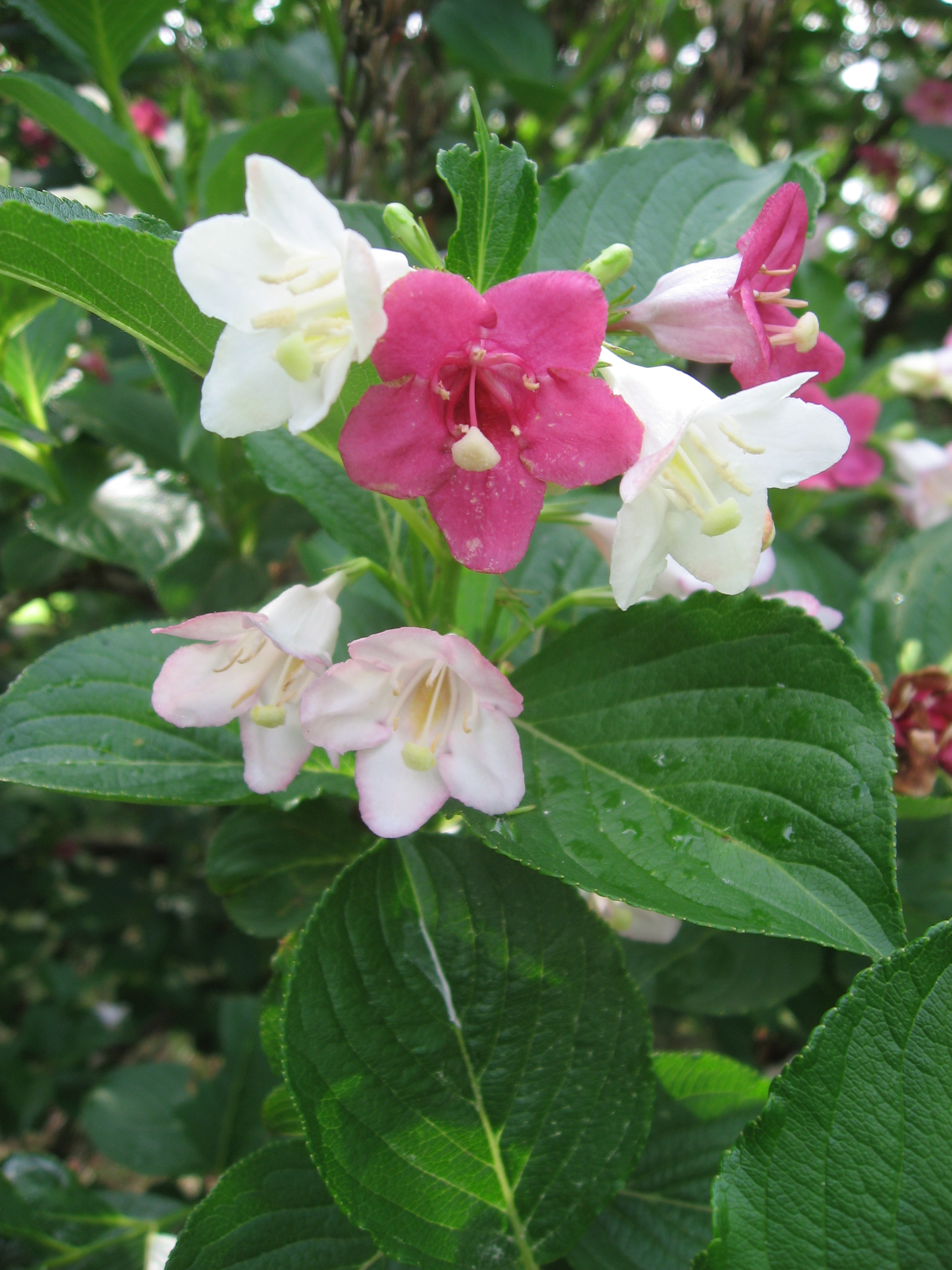

Scientific classification
- Kingdom: Plantae
- Clade: Tracheophytes
- Clade: Angiosperms
- Clade: Eudicots
- Clade: Asterids
- Order: Dipsacales
- Family: Caprifoliaceae
- Genus: Weigela
- Species: W. coraeensis

Binomial name
- Weigela coraeensis Thunb.

= Weigela coraeensis =

Species of flowering plant

Weigela coraeensis is a species of flowering plant in the family Caprifoliaceae. It is native to Japan.

== Distribution ==
This species is native to Honshu. However, it has been naturalised to other regions and can now be seen growing near seashores throughout Japan.

== Description ==
This deciduous shrub has dark-green leaves. Its funnel-shaped flowers go from white in late spring to pink in early summer. They are pollinated by bees.

Their toothed leaves are ovular shaped, shiny, sharp-pointed, and bristly stalked. They can grow to become up to 10cm long.

They can grow to reach between 2.5 - 4m and can spread up to 3m.

== Cultivation ==
This plant can be propagated with both hardwood and softwood cuttings. In addition, they prefer to occur under direct sunlight, although they can tolerate partial shade. They are suited for fertile, well-drained soil. Their rate of growth is quite fast and is tolerant to pollution and pruning. It is also a hardy plant. It can possibly tolerate low temperatures down to -20°C. It can also be exposed to coastal environments. It has gained the Royal Horticultural Society's Award of Garden Merit.

== Pests ==
This species is susceptible to eelworms and honey fungus.
