= Weigl =

Weigl is a German surname. Notable people with the surname include:

- Bruce Weigl, American poet
- Joseph Weigl, Austrian composer and conductor
- Julian Weigl, German footballer
- Karl Weigl, Austrian composer
- Rudolf Weigl, Polish biologist
- Thaddäus Weigl (1776–1844), Austrian composer and music publisher, brother of Joseph Weigl
- Vally Weigl, Austrian composer
- Zofia Weigl, Polish biologist

== See also ==
- Weigel
