= Veigel =

Veigel is a surname. Notable people with the surname include:

- Al Veigel (1917–2012), American baseball player
- Eva Marie Veigel (1724–1822), British dancer
- Werner Veigel (1928–1995), German journalist and news presenter

== See also ==
- Vergel
- Weigel
