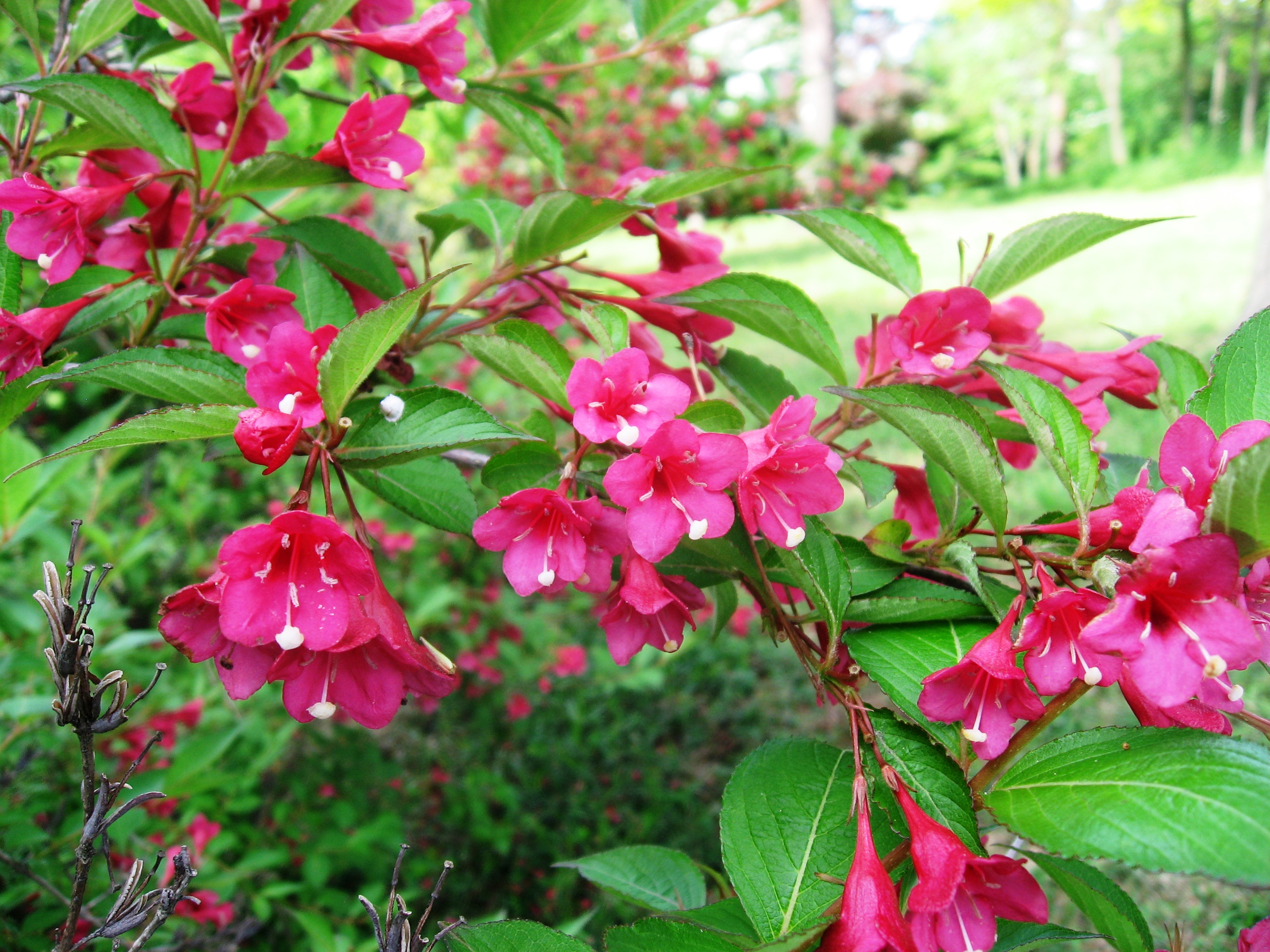
- Flowering in Musashi Kyūryō National Government Park

Scientific classification
- Kingdom: Plantae
- Clade: Tracheophytes
- Clade: Angiosperms
- Clade: Eudicots
- Clade: Asterids
- Order: Dipsacales
- Family: Caprifoliaceae
- Genus: Weigela
- Species: W. floribunda

Binomial name
- Weigela floribunda (Siebold & Zucc.) K.Koch

Synonyms
- List: Diervilla floribunda Siebold & Zucc.; Diervilla floribunda var. grandiflora Dippel; Diervilla floribunda f. grandiflora (Dippel) Voss; Diervilla multiflora Lem.; Diervilla sanguinea Nakai; Diervilla sanguinea var. leucantha Nakai; Diervilla sanguinea var. nakaii Makino; Diervilla sanguinea var. versicolor Makino; Weigela arborea Dippel; Weigela arborea-grandiflora Jacob-Makoy; Weigela arborescens Dippel; Weigela arborescens-versicolor Jacob-Makoy; Weigela floribunda f. grandiflora (Dippel) Rehder; Weigela floribunda f. kariyosensis (Nakai) H.Hara; Weigela floribunda f. leucantha Honda; Weigela kariyosensis Nakai; Weigela sanguinea (Nakai) Nakai; Weigela sanguinea var. leucantha (Nakai) Nakai

= Weigela floribunda =

Species of plant

Weigela floribunda, the crimson weigela, is a species of flowering plant in the family Caprifoliaceae. It is native to Honshu and Shikoku, Japan, and it has been introduced to Bulgaria and to Connecticut, New York, and Massachusetts in the US. A shrub reaching 3 m (10 ft), it has dark red to crimson funnel-shaped flowers.
