= Mira Lobe =

Austrian writer

- מירה לובה
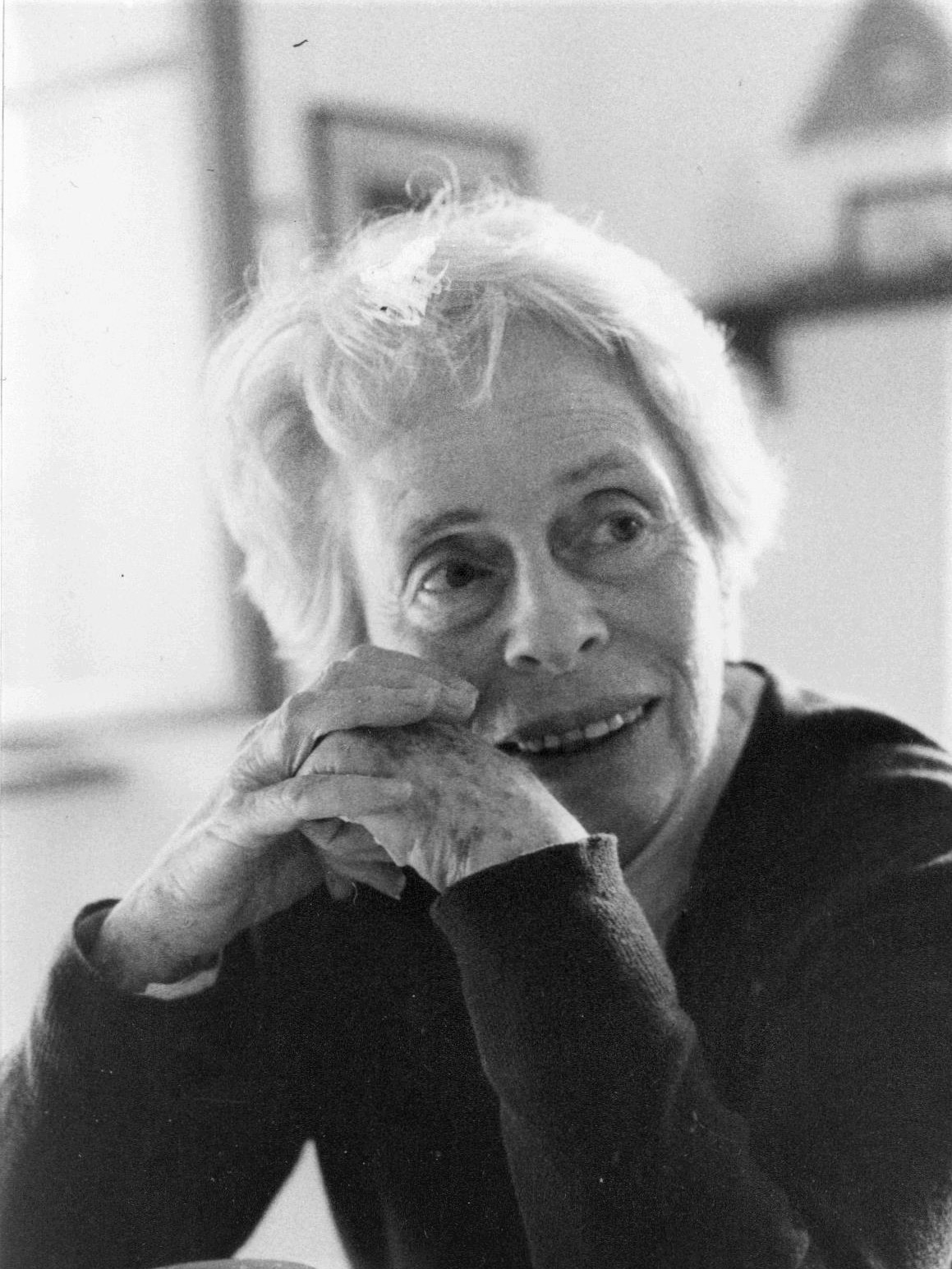
- Mira Lobe in 1990
- Born: September 17, 1913; Görlitz, Silesia
- Died: February 6, 1995 (aged 81); Vienna, Austria
- Occupation: Writer
- Spouse: Friedrich Lobe
- Writing career
- Genre: Children's literature
- Notable works: Insu-Pu, Titi im Urwald
- Notable awards: Österreichischer Kinder- und Jugendbuchpreis

Mira Lobe (Hebrew: מירה לובה; born Hilde Mirjam Rosenthal; September 17, 1913, in Görlitz, Silesia – February 6, 1995, in Vienna) was an Austrian writer of more than 100 children's books.

Some of her books were translated into English and other languages, such as Es ging ein Schneemann durch das Land, which became The Snowman Who Went for a Walk in English. The television series Children's Island (1984) was based on one of her novels.

== Life ==
After school, Mira Lobe wanted to study art history and German language and literature, but because she was Jewish, Lobe was not allowed due to the growing antisemitism. Instead she attended a fashion school in Berlin, joined a Labor Zionist youth group and studied Hebrew.

In 1936, she emigrated to Mandate Palestine, where in 1940 she married the actor and director Friedrich Lobe. The couple had two children. Her first book, Insu-Pu, was published in 1948 in Tel Aviv. It tells the story of eleven children on their way to Terrania, where there is peace. They become stranded on a desert island where they manage to establish a perfectly working state.

In 1951, she moved to Vienna with her husband. There she published books in first a communist and later a socialist publishing house. In Austria, she met and befriended illustrator Susi Weigel, whose illustrations are included in many of her works.

In 1957, after the closure of the theatre Scala in Vienna, Friedrich was offered a position at Deutsches Theater and the family moved to East Berlin. The family returned to Vienna just a year later, where Lobe lived and worked until her death in 1995. She is buried in the Jewish section of Vienna Central Cemetery.

== Honours and commemoration ==
Mira Lobe was awarded the Austrian Children's Books prize four times. In 1958, for Titi im Urwald (Titi in the Jungle), in 1965, for Omama im Apfelbaum (The Grandma in the Apple Tree) in 1972, for Das kleine Ich-bin-Ich (The Little I-Am-Me) and in 1976, for Der ist ganz anders, als Ihr glaubt (Not What You Think).

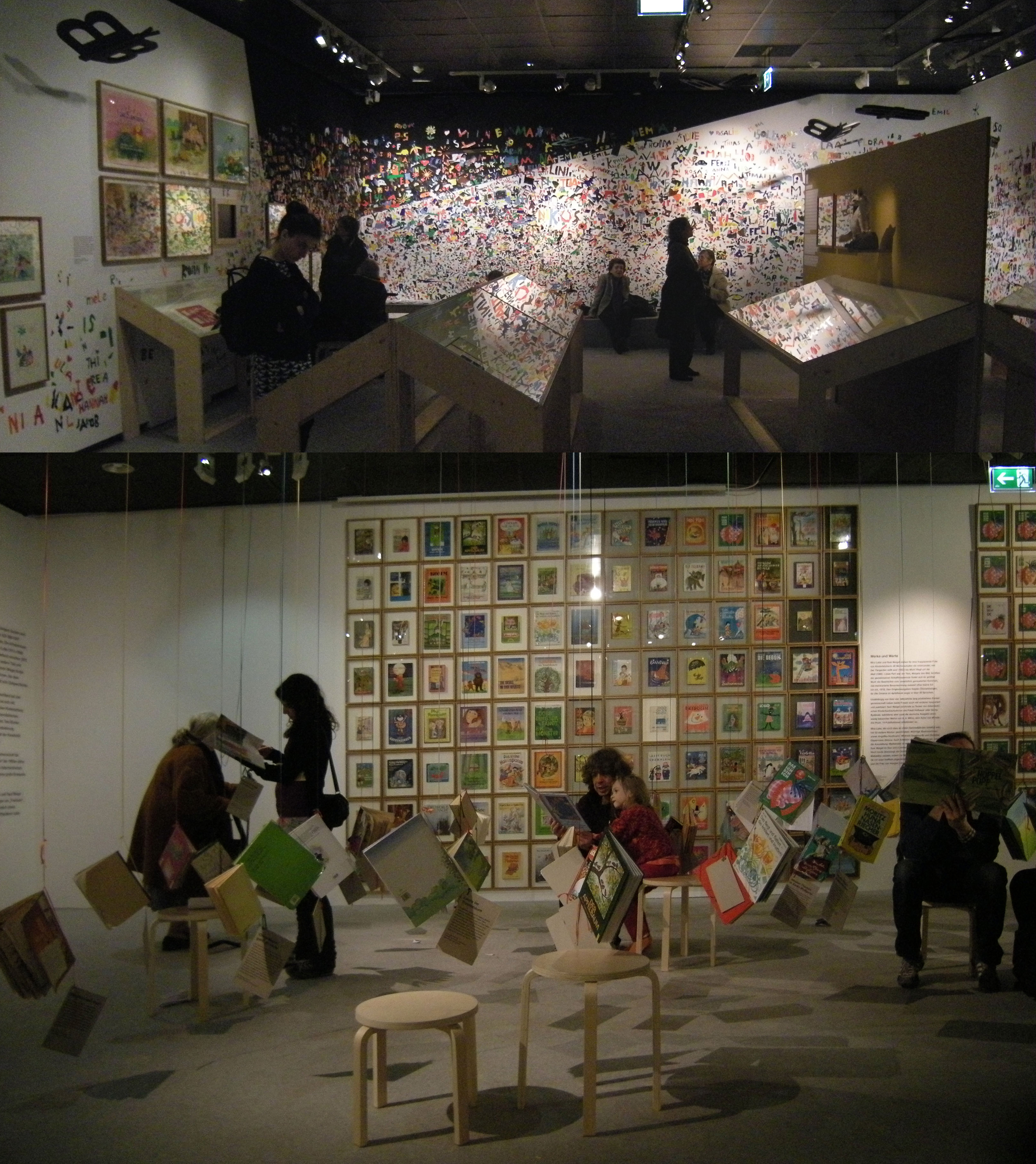
Mira Lobe exhibit, Vienna, Austria, in 2014/15. In lower frame's background, some 112 covers of Lobe's books are shown.

In 1997, a street in the Donaustadt district of Vienna was named after her. A school and kindergarten, also bearing her name, are located close to it. A grade school in Linz, Upper Austria, bears her name as well. Additionally two schools in Germany, in Eppertshausen and Dortmund, are named in honour of Mira Lobe.

In 2013, in celebration of her 100th birthday, the village of Annaberg in Lower-Austria, where Lobe had a second home, organized an exhibition about her life and work. Additionally, her city of birth, Görlitz, organized a symposium and unveiled a commemorative plate in celebration of her centennial.

From 2014 to 2015, the Vienna Museum organized an exhibition in honor of her. The exhibition was later adapted and showed at the vorarlberg museum.

In 2023, the city of Vienna, named a Gemeindebau building in Döbling after her.

The Austrian Ministry of Education awards annual Mira Lobe scholarships to promising young authors.

== Works (incomplete) ==
In all of Mira Lobe's books, peace, tolerance and social awareness are important topics. Many of her books were illustrated by Susi Weigel, while others include illustrations by Angelika Kaufmann, Winfried Opgenoorth and others.

=== Translated to English ===
- The Zoo Breaks Out (1958)
- City Boy, Country Boy (1961(
- Johnny and the Boople (1963)
- The Grandma in the Apple Tree (1970)
- Bimbulli (1972)
- Hoppelpop! (1977)
- What Horrible Creatures (1978)
- Hocus-Pocus (1979)
- Let Me Out! Said the Mouse (1980)
- Not What You Think (1980)
- Valerie and the Good-Night Swing (1982)
- Pig in a Muddle (1983)
- The Castle Ghost (1984)
- The Snowman Who Went for a Walk (1984)
- Ben and the Child of the Forest (1988)
- I Am Me (1989)
- Christoph Wants a Party (1995)

== See also ==
- List of Austrian writers
