= Weigle =

Weigle is a surname. Notable people with the surname include:

- Edwin F. Weigle (1889–1973), Dutch engineer and politician
- George J. Weigle (1871–1956), member of the Wisconsin State Senate
- Gottfried Weigle (1816–1855), German missionary
- Jean Weigle (1901–1968), Swiss molecular biologist
- Jörg-Peter Weigle (born 1953), German conductor and music professor
- Kent Weigle (born 1955), American ice dancer
- Mark Weigle (born 1967), American singer and songwriter
- Marta Weigle (1944–2018), American anthropologist and folklorist
- Sebastian Weigle (born 1961), German conductor
- William Weigle (born 1940), American racewalker

== See also ==
- Weigel, surname
- Weigle Barn, historic structure in Kansas
