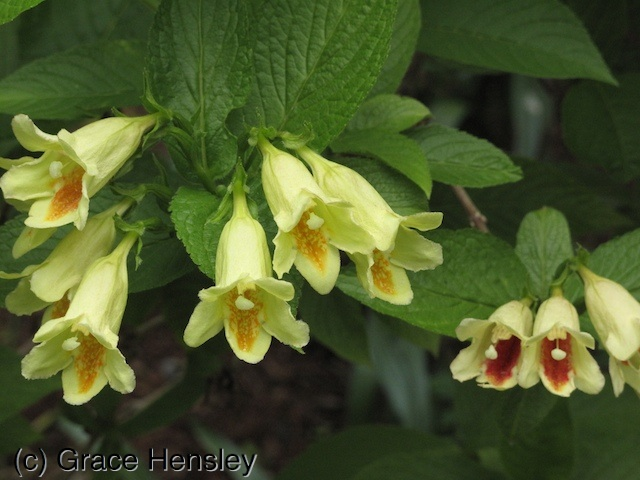
- Throats of flowers redden with age
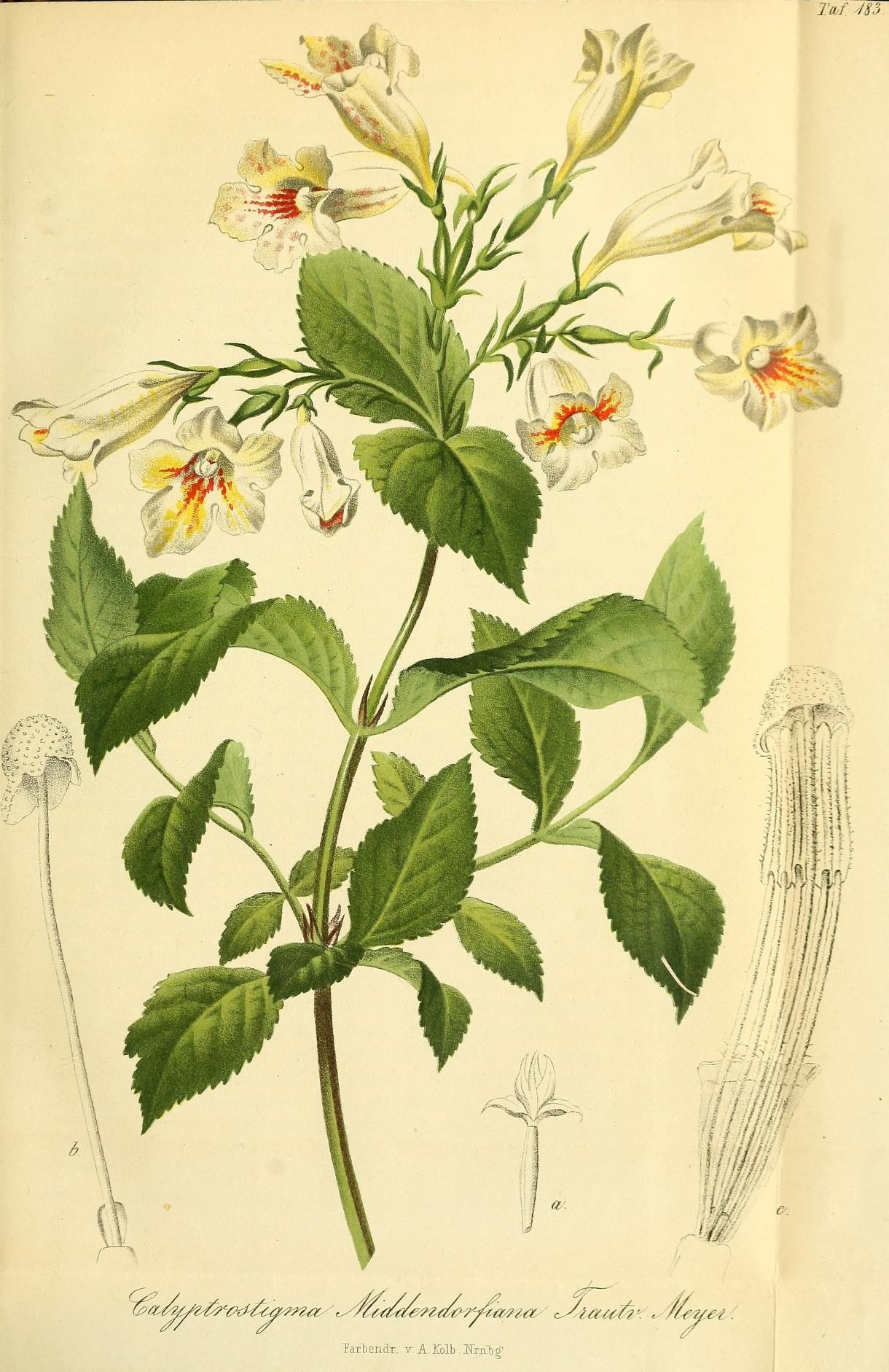
- Botanical illustration

Scientific classification
- Kingdom: Plantae
- Clade: Tracheophytes
- Clade: Angiosperms
- Clade: Eudicots
- Clade: Asterids
- Order: Dipsacales
- Family: Caprifoliaceae
- Genus: Weigela
- Species: W. middendorffiana

Binomial name
- Weigela middendorffiana (Carrière) K.Koch

Synonyms
- Calyptrostigma middendorffianum (Carrière) Trautv. & C.A.Mey.; Diervilla middendorffiana Carrière; Macrodiervilla middendorffiana (Carrière) Nakai; Macrodiervilla middendorffiana var. angustifolia Nakai; Wagneria middendorffiana (Carrière) Lem.

= Weigela middendorffiana =

Species of plant

Weigela middendorffiana, the Middendorf weigela, is a species of flowering plant in the family Caprifoliaceae. It is native to the southern Russian Far East; Khabarovsk Krai, Primorsky Krai, Sakhalin, and the Kurils, and to northern Japan. An erect, deciduous shrub reaching 2 m (7 ft), it is typically found in montane ecosystems up to the tree line. It and its compact cultivar 'Mango' are widely available from commercial nurseries.

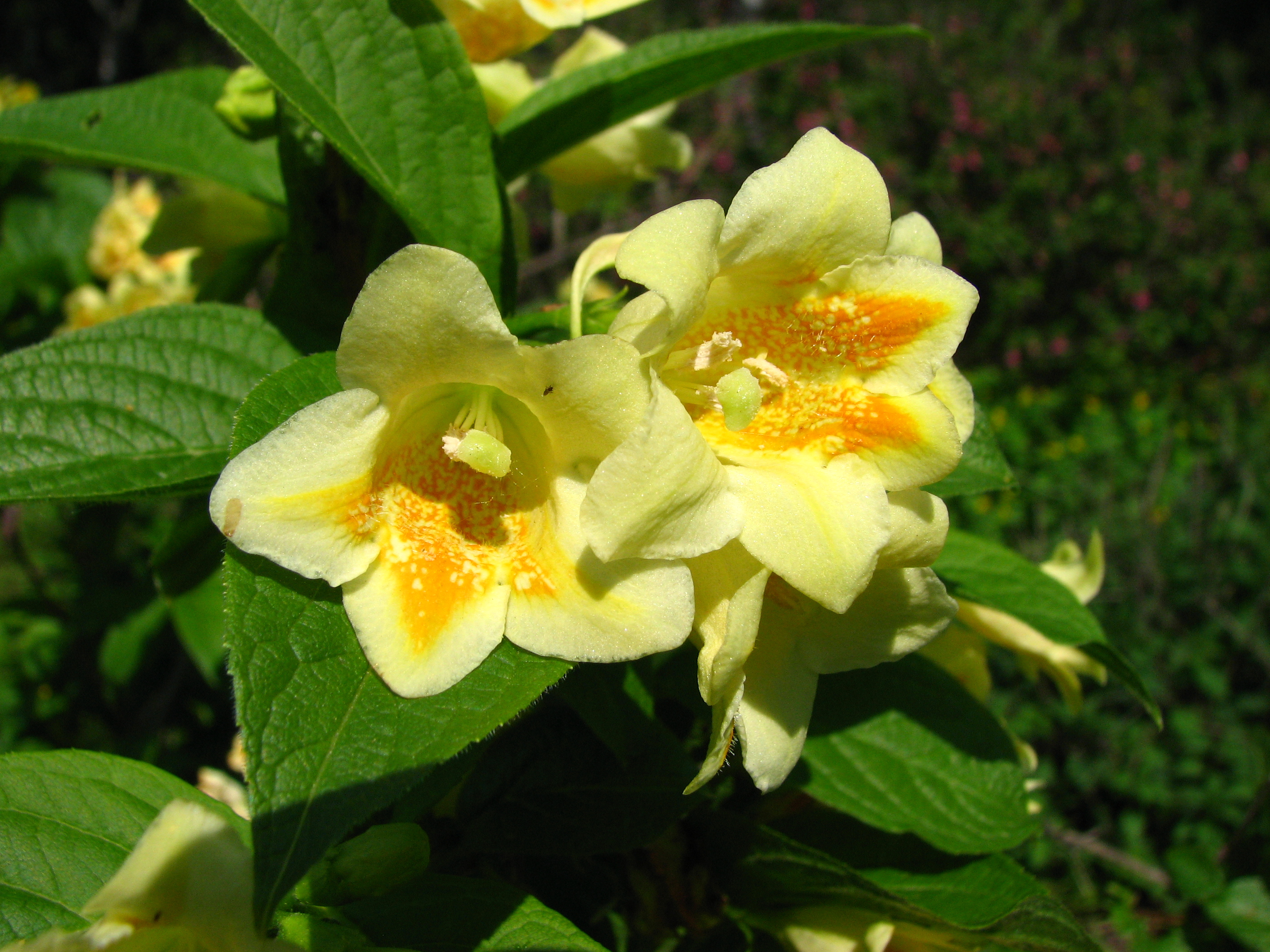
Close-up of flowers

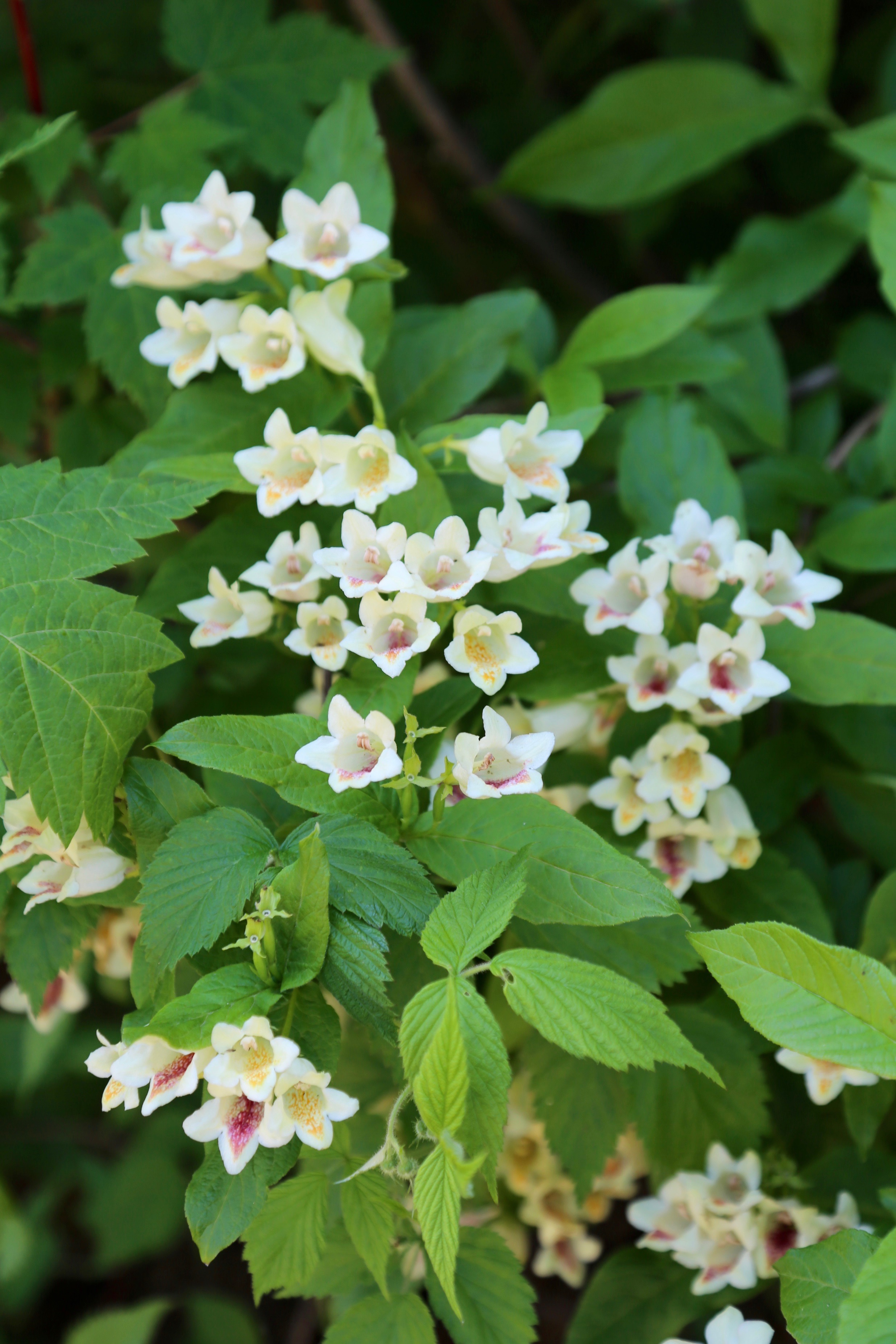
An individual with pale flowers

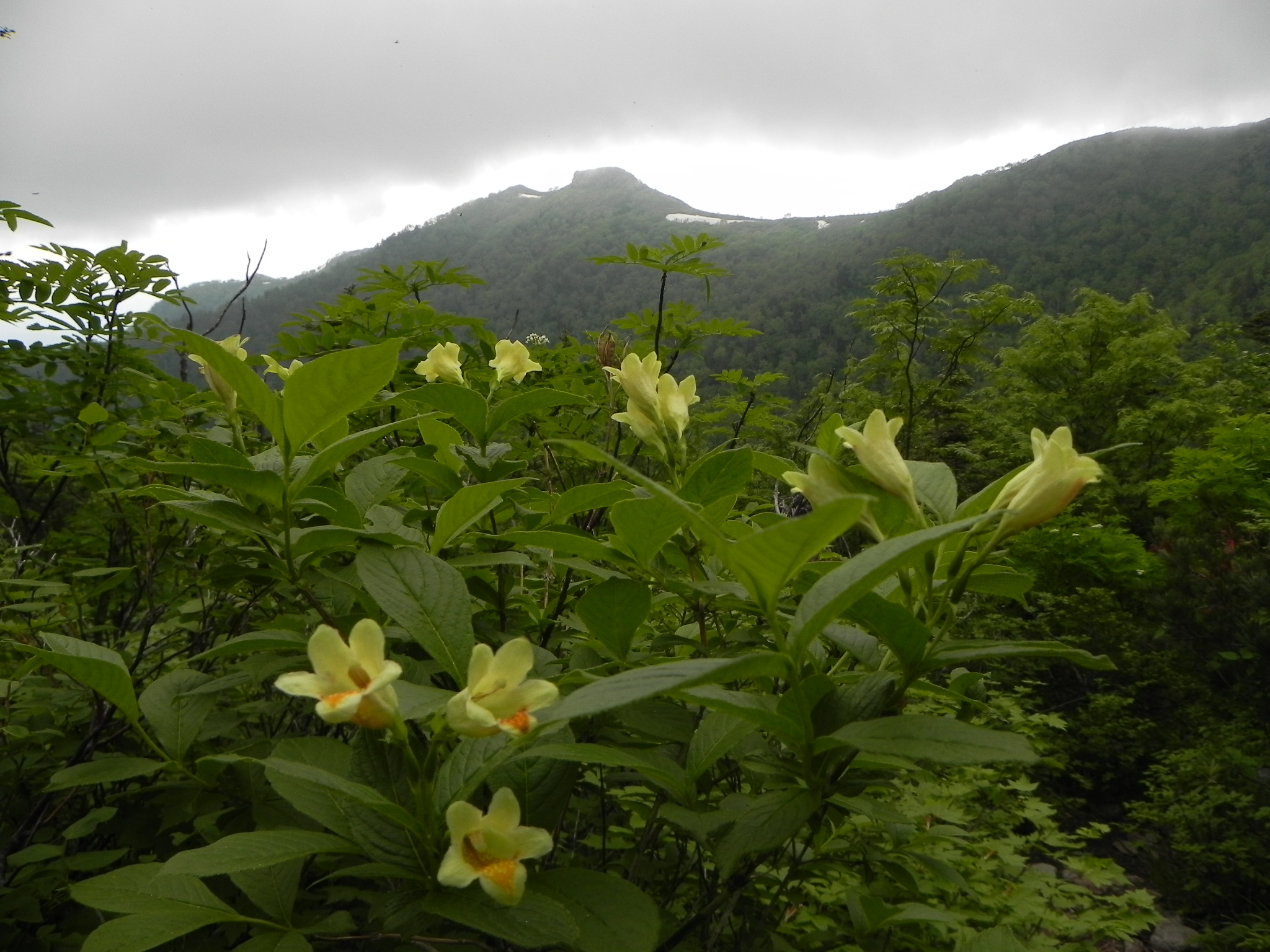
In Daisetsuzan National Park, Hokkaido
