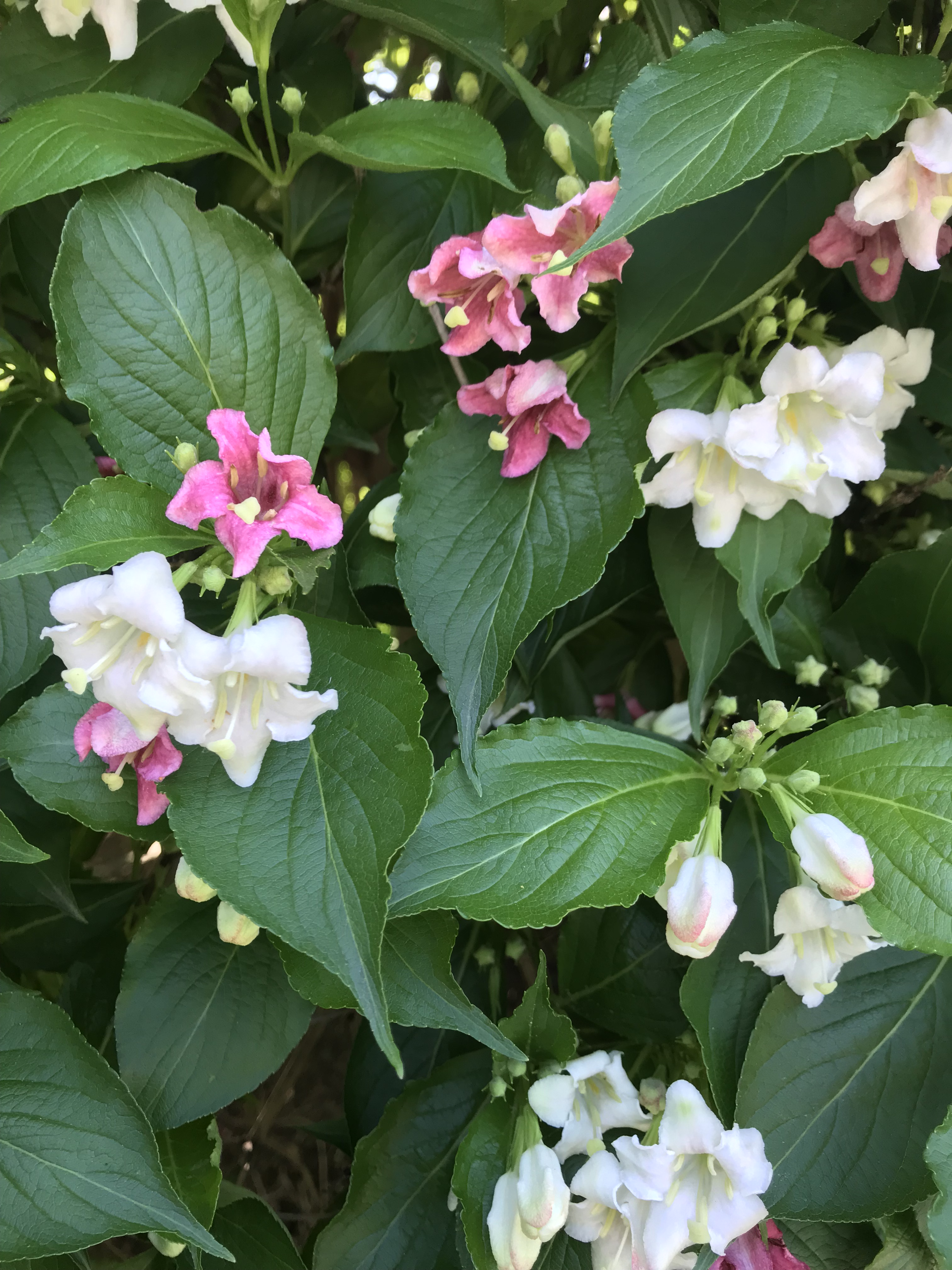
- Weigela japonica, 'Dart's Colourdream' cultivar
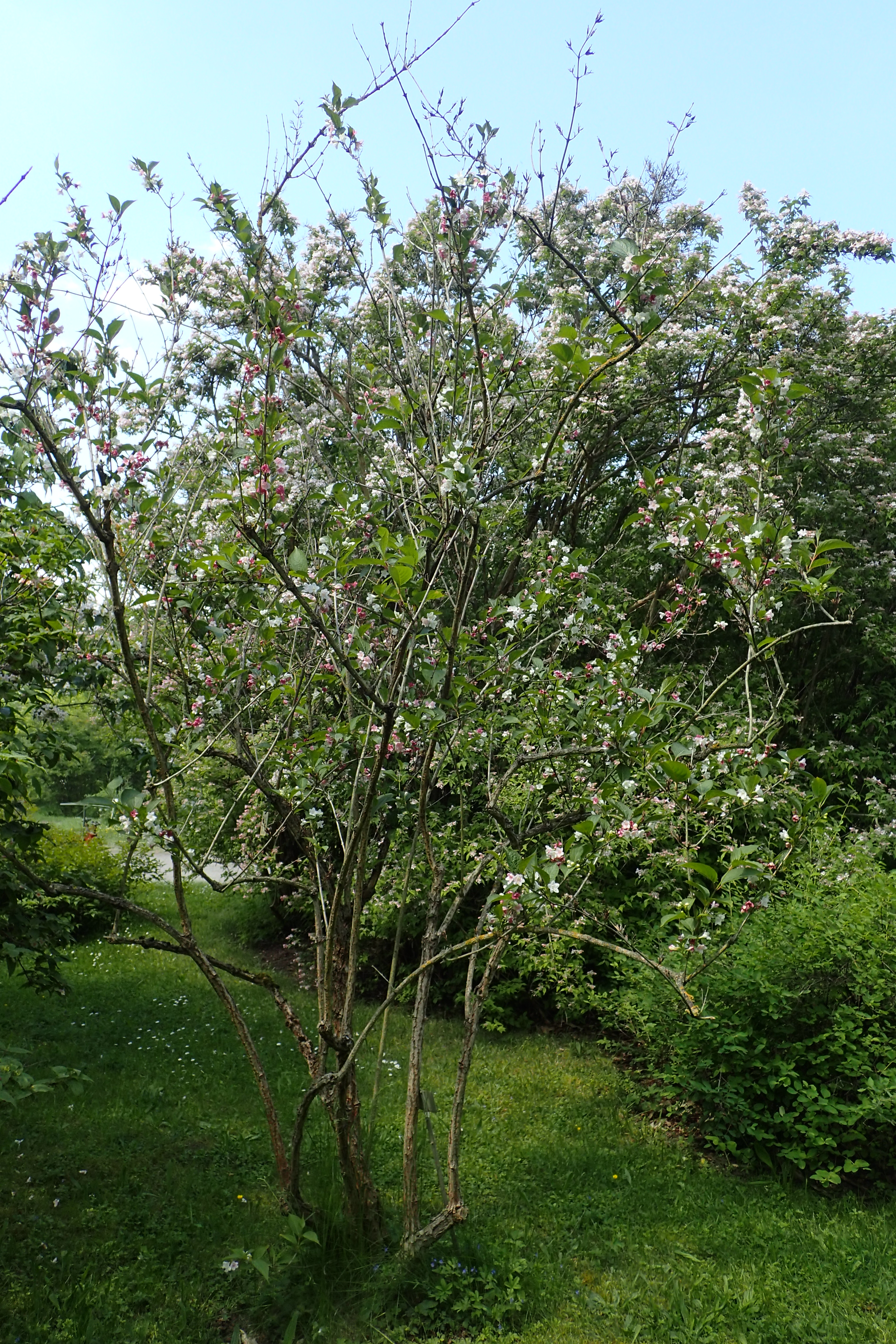
- At the Berlin Botanical Garden and Botanical Museum

Scientific classification
- Kingdom: Plantae
- Clade: Tracheophytes
- Clade: Angiosperms
- Clade: Eudicots
- Clade: Asterids
- Order: Dipsacales
- Family: Caprifoliaceae
- Genus: Weigela
- Species: W. japonica

Binomial name
- Weigela japonica Thunb.

Synonyms
- Diervilla floribunda var. versicolor Rehder; Diervilla japonica (Thunb.) DC.; Diervilla japonica var. sinica Rehder; Diervilla versicolor Siebold & Zucc.; Weigela floribunda var. versicolor (Rehder) Rehder; Weigela sinica (Rehder) H.Hara

= Weigela japonica =

Species of plant

Weigela japonica, the Japanese weigela, is a species of flowering plant in the family Caprifoliaceae. It is native to southern China and southern Japan, and it has been introduced to the US state of New York, Bulgaria, and probably other locales. A deciduous shrub or small tree reaching 6 m (20 ft), it is typically found in scrublands and woodlands at elevations from 400 to 1,800 m (1,300 to 5,900 ft). Its cultivar 'Dart's Colourdream', which reaches 2.5 m (8 ft), is available from commercial nurseries.

== Subtaxa ==
The following varieties are accepted:

- Weigela japonica var. japonica – southern Japan
- Weigela japonica var. sinica (Rehder) L.H.Bailey – southern China
