= Susi Weigel =

Austrian illustrator (1914–1990)

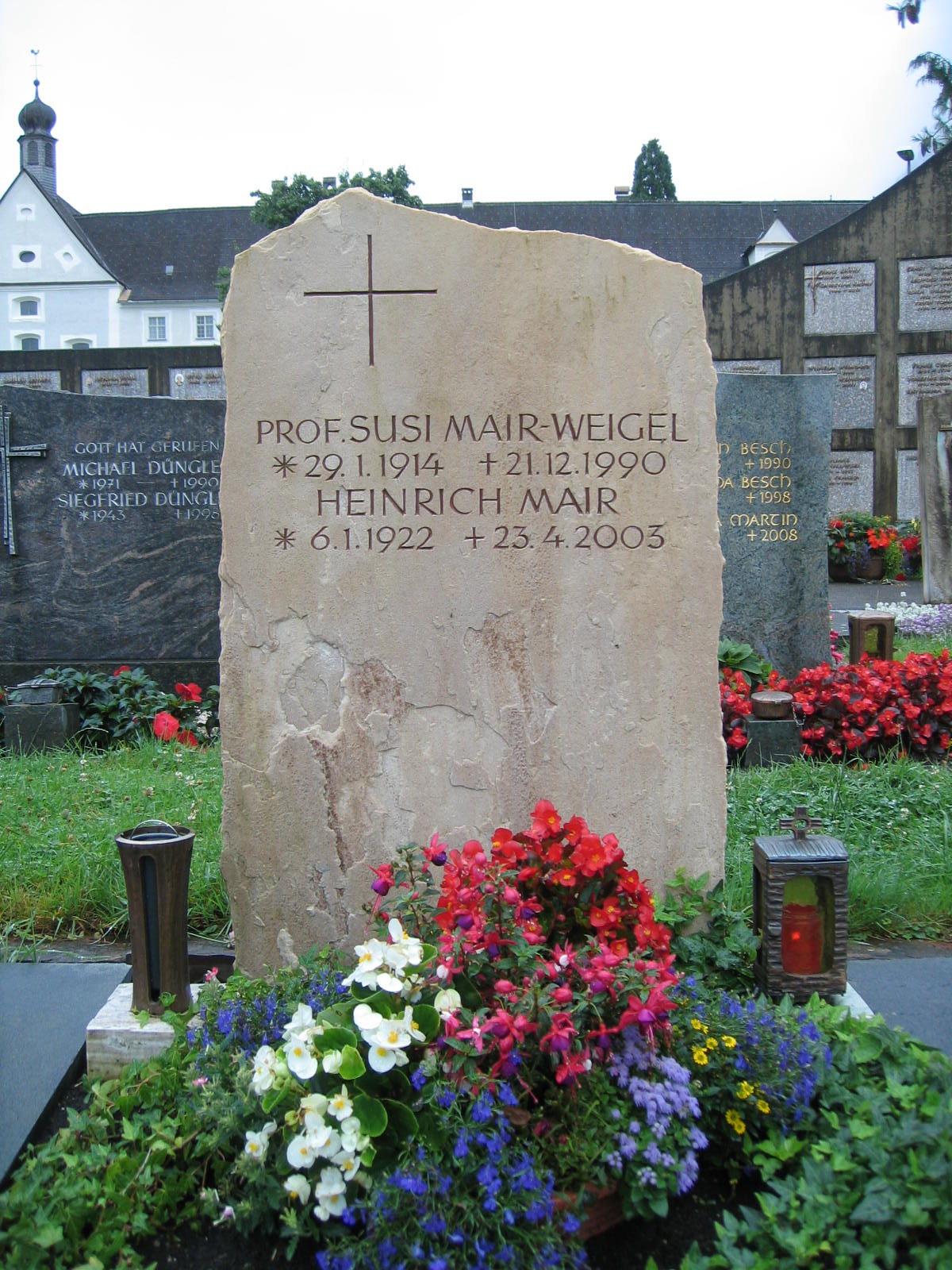
- Weigel's grave
- Born: Susi Weigel; January 29, 1914; Prostějov
- Died: December 21, 1990 (aged 76); Bludenz

Susi Weigel (1914–1990), born in Austria, was an illustrator and animator. Weigel illustrated 45 children’s books including many by Austrian writer Mira Lobe. Kindergarten Susi Weigel, a kindergarten in Bludenz, Austria, is named after her.

== Works (incomplete) ==
- Lobe, Mira - Johnny and the Boople. (1963). Harrap.
- Lobe, Mira - City Boy, Country Boy. (1963). Wonder Books.
- Lobe, Mira - Little I-am-me. (2014). Verl.
