= Tom Weigel =

American poet and artist (1948–2017)

Tom Weigel (October 14, 1948 – October 2017) was an American poet, playwright, visual artist, editor, and publisher. He was a principal member of the third generation of the New York School.

== Life and work ==
Tom Weigel was born in Astoria, Queens, NY to Thomas Peter Weigel and Theresa Patricia Sheehan (Weigel) both of New York City. His grandfather, John J. Sheehan, was born in County Cork, Ireland. The Weigel family, of German descent, had a hardware store in New York City during the 1920s located on 2nd Avenue and 64th Street. Tom graduated from Northport High School, on Long Island in 1966. He began writing poetry and fiction in his early teens as well as writing for the school newspaper and The Northport Journal.

In 1968/69 Weigel lived on West 4th Street in New York City. His upstairs neighbor, was the filmmaker and poet, Piero Heliczer who introduced Weigel to the Poetry Project where he gave his first reading.

Weigel attended Parsons School of Design while working for a variety of Architectural firms in New York City including: I.M. Pei, Skidmore, Owings & Merrill and Edward Larrabee Barnes. In 1970 he married designer Frances Beeler, and they moved to Buffalo, New York and later to Louisville, Kentucky where Weigel worked at the McCauley Theater. In 1977 he divorced and returned to New York City living in an apartment on East 6th Street in the East Village.

Weigel’s poetry was widely published in magazines during the years 1966–2018. His work can be seen in over 150 poetry publications including The Paris Review. He was one of the early publishers of small 8 1/2 × 11-inch stapled mimeograph magazines. Mimeo Revolution.

He studied writing at the Poetry Project, taking classes with poet Alice Notley and became friends with Ted Berrigan and Charles Henri Ford. During this time that he began publishing Tangerine Magazine and The Full Deck Anthology which included works by a wide array of East Village poets active in the 1970s and 1980s. His press, Andrea Doria Books, published the poets Helena Hughes, Angela Dryden and Michael Scholnick, among others.

Weigel has read his work at hundreds of venues, including The Museum of Modern Art Poetry Series hosted by Lita Hornick in May 1986 as well as The Ear Inn with Peter Schjeldahl. He read on Radio Belgrade (in the former Yugoslavia) with Nina Živančević.

Tom was introduced to Jackie Curtis by Andy Warhol at an art opening. Jackie and Tom soon became good friends and Tom’s apartment often became the outpost for reading plays and poet gatherings. A frequent guest was Margo Howard Howard. Together, Margo and Tom established The Mary Stuart Society. Weigel wrote an account of this time period in his book titled: Portrait of a Playwright: The Jackie Curtis Story.

After the deaths of many of the New York poets, artists and friends, Weigel moved out to New London, Connecticut, and worked for the Lyman Allyn Art Museum. During this time he ran a poetry series at the local coffee house, Muddy Waters, and later at the Bean and Leaf Cafe while publishing a poetry magazine, BURP. His contributions to the establishment of a New London poetry scene was recognized by the town Council. On August 18, 2014, Mayor Finizio and President Hyslop presented a joint proclamation to Weigel for his dedication and support of local poets.

The Australian Visual Poet, Artist and Filmmaker, Pete Spence, publishes an ongoing magazine dedicated to Tom titled OZ BURP.

== Published works ==
- Homefront (1970)
- Panic Hardware (1979)
- Audrey Hepburn's Symphonic Salad and the Coming of Autumn (1979)
- Sonnets (1980)
- Little Heart (1981)
- Twenty-Four Haiku After the Japanese (1982)
- Ginger Root Trail (1985)
- East of the Sun (2000)
- A Haiku Valley (2003)
- Portrait of a Playwright: The Jackie Curtis Story (2005)
- Cauliflower or Bust (2005)
- Haiku You Can Squeeze (2007)
- Extended Glitch (2008)
- Around the Long View (2009)
- A Faint Humming (2009)
- Watch That Side (2012)
- Time Further Out (2015)
- Mambo (2016)

== Health and later years ==
In 2014, Weigel’s health deteriorated as he battled diabetes and cancer. He moved to an apartment in Chester, NY to be close to his sister, Monica Claire Antonie, who was caring for him. His remains were buried in the Chester, NY Cemetery. One of his Haiku’s are carved into the headstone, it reads:

in the frosted stillness

wondering where the wind goes

when it’s not blowing
