= Christian Ehrenfried Weigel =

German scientist and academic (1748–1831)

Christian von Weigel
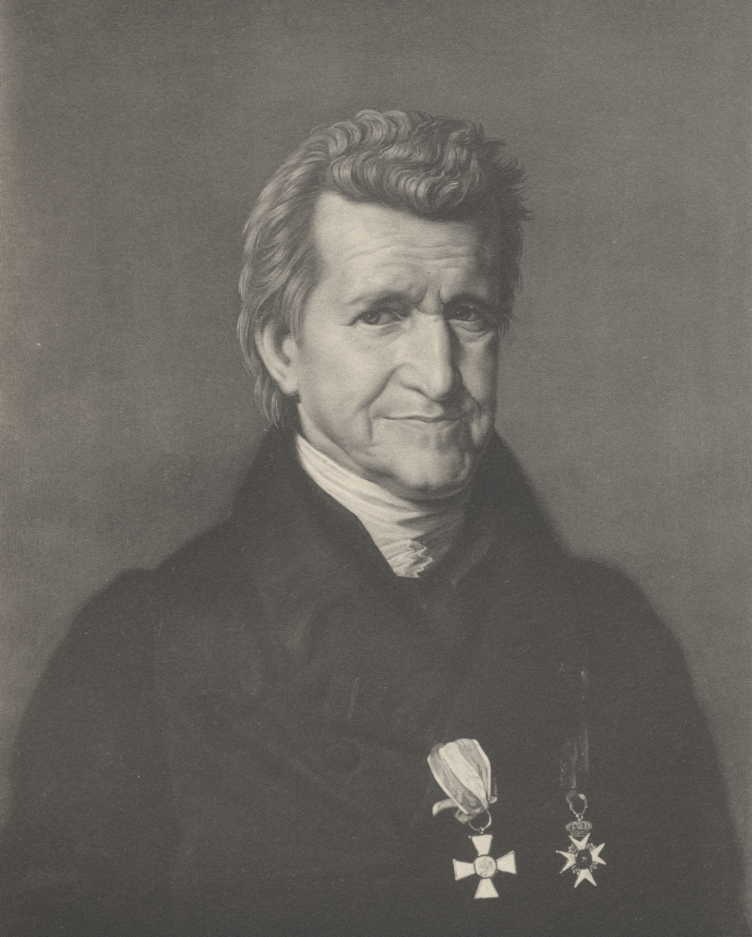
- Born: Christian Ehrenfried Weigel; 24 May 1748; Stralsund, Swedish Pomerania
- Died: 8 August 1831 (aged 83); Greifswald, Province of Pomerania, Kingdom of Prussia
- Education: University of Göttingen (M.D., 1771)
- Scientific career
- Fields: Chemist, botanist
- Institutions: University of Greifswald
- Doctoral advisor: Johann Christian Erxleben
- Doctoral students: Karl Rudolphi
- Author abbrev. (botany): Weigel

Christian Ehrenfried von Weigel (24 May 1748 – 8 August 1831) was a German scientist and, beginning in 1774, a professor of chemistry, pharmacy, botany, and mineralogy at the University of Greifswald.

== Biography ==
Born in Stralsund, in 1771 he received his medical doctorate from the University of Göttingen, having studied under Johann Christian Erxleben. In 1806, Weigel was ennobled and carried from then on a von in his name. He became the personal physician of the Swedish royal house two years later. Among other things, Weigel developed a cooling heat exchanger (German Gegenstromkühler) (1771), which was later improved upon by Justus von Liebig and then became known as the Liebig condenser (Liebigkühler). Furthermore, the honeysuckle genus Weigela is named after him. In 1792, he was elected a foreign member of the Royal Swedish Academy of Sciences.
