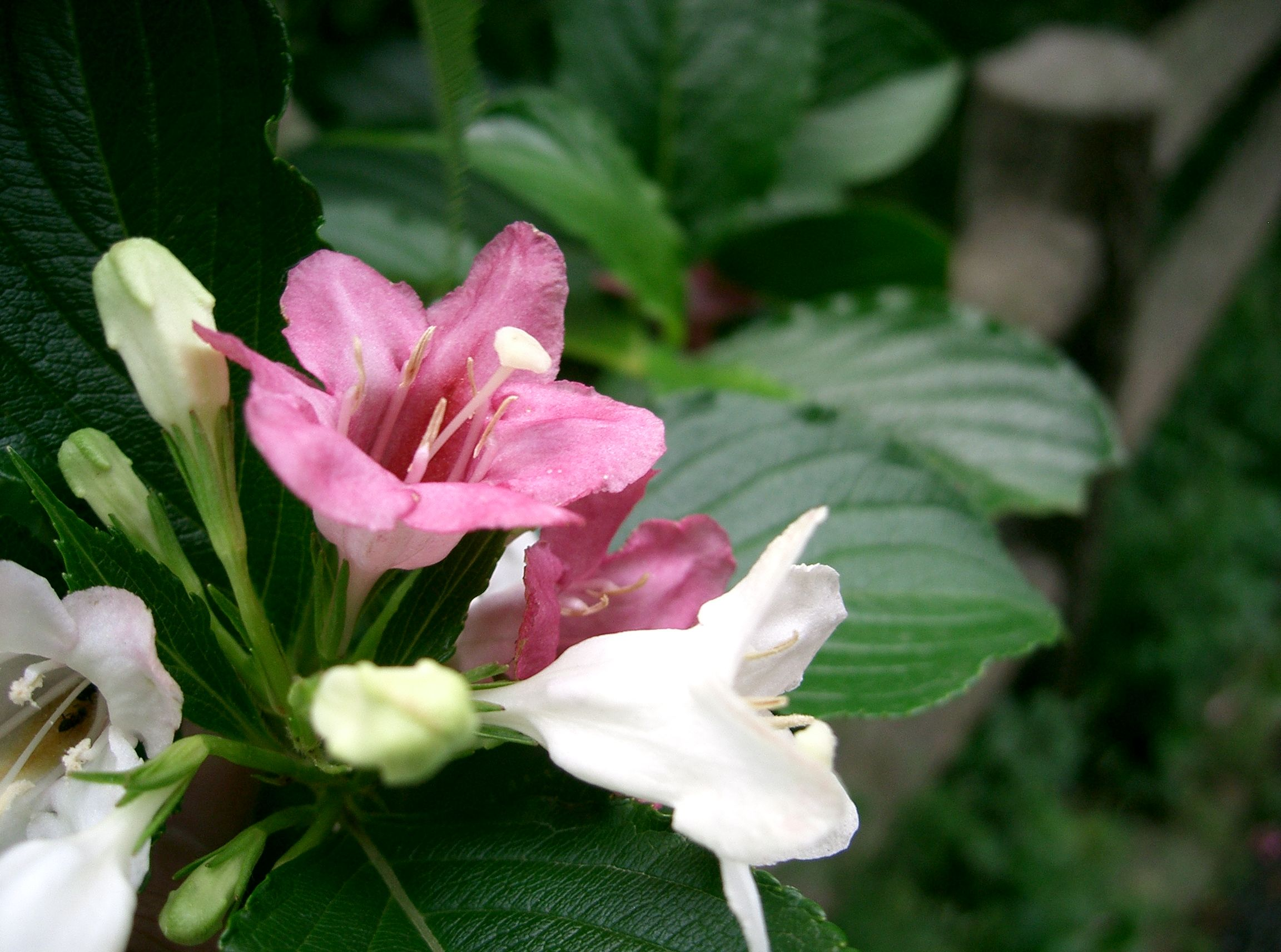
- Weigela coraeensis flowers and leaves

Scientific classification
- Kingdom: Plantae
- Clade: Embryophytes
- Clade: Tracheophytes
- Clade: Angiosperms
- Clade: Eudicots
- Clade: Asterids
- Order: Dipsacales
- Family: Caprifoliaceae
- Subfamily: Diervilloideae
- Genus: Weigela; Thunb.

Species
- See text

= Weigela =

Genus of flowering plants in the honeysuckle family

Weigela /waɪˈdʒiːlə/ is a genus of between six and 38 species of deciduous shrubs in the family Caprifoliaceae, growing to 1–5 m (3–15′) tall. All are natives of eastern Asia. The genus is named after the German scientist Christian Ehrenfried Weigel.

== Description ==
The leaves are 5–15 cm (2.0–5.9 in) long, ovate-oblong with an acuminate tip, and with a serrated margin.

The flowers are 2–4 cm long, with a five-lobed white, pink, or red (rarely yellow) corolla, produced in small corymbs of several together in early summer.

The fruit is a dry capsule containing numerous small winged seeds.

== Fossil record ==
Several fossil seeds and fruit fragments of †Weigela srodoniowae have been described from middle Miocene strata of the Fasterholt area near Silkeborg in Central Jutland, Denmark.

== Garden history ==
The first species to be collected for Western gardens, Weigela florida, distributed in North China, Korea and Manchuria, was found by Robert Fortune and imported to England in 1845. Following the opening of Japan to Westerners, several Weigela species and garden versions were discovered by European plant-hunters in the 1850s and 1860s, though they were already well known in Japan.

The British Weigela national collection is held at Sheffield Botanical Gardens; along with the national collection of the closely related genus Diervilla. The German Weigela national collection, Sichtungsgarten Weigela, is in Buckow, Märkische Schweiz.

== Ecology ==
Weigela species are used as food plants by the larvae of some Lepidoptera species including brown-tail.

== Accepted species ==
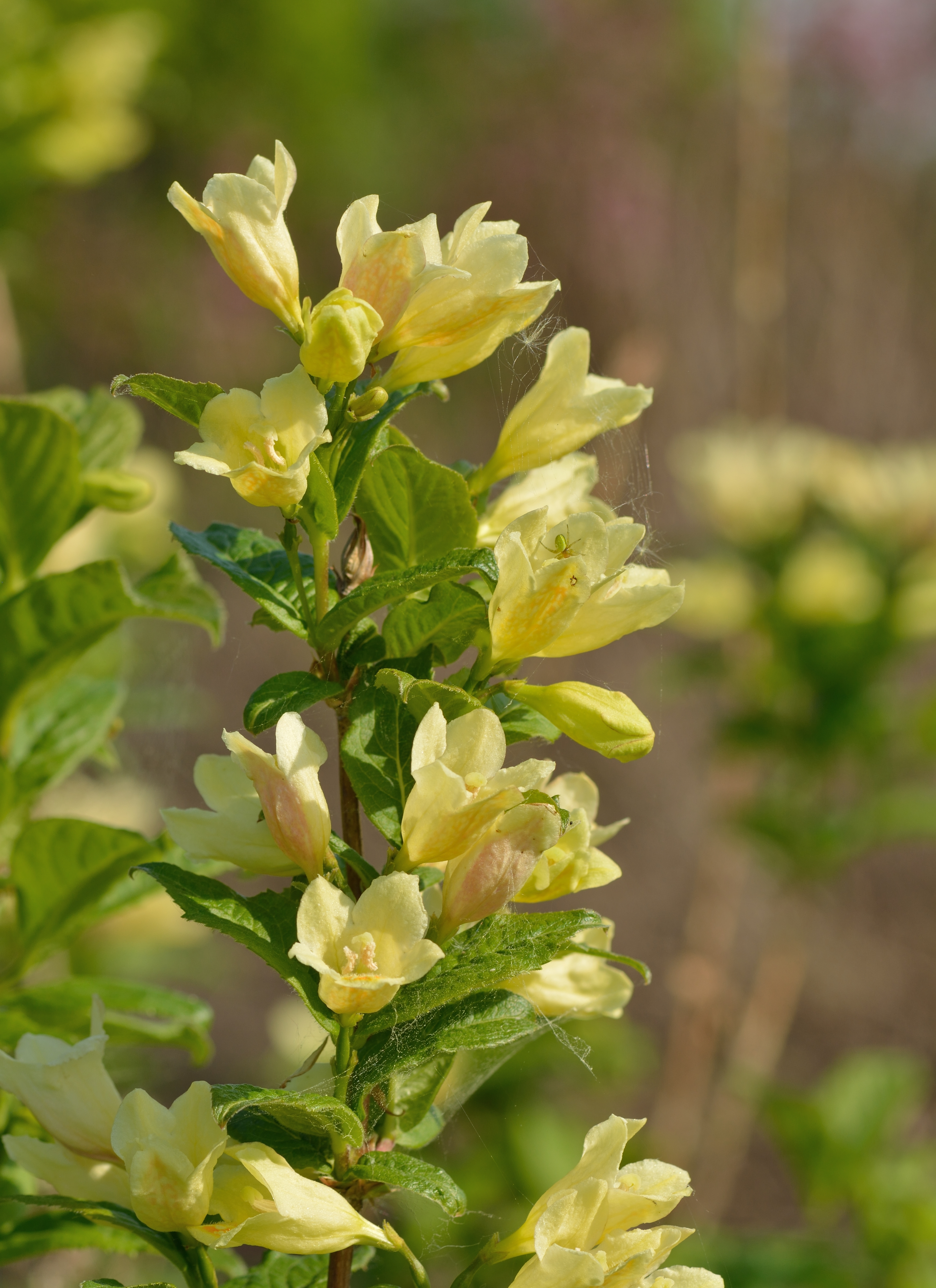
Weigela middendorffiana

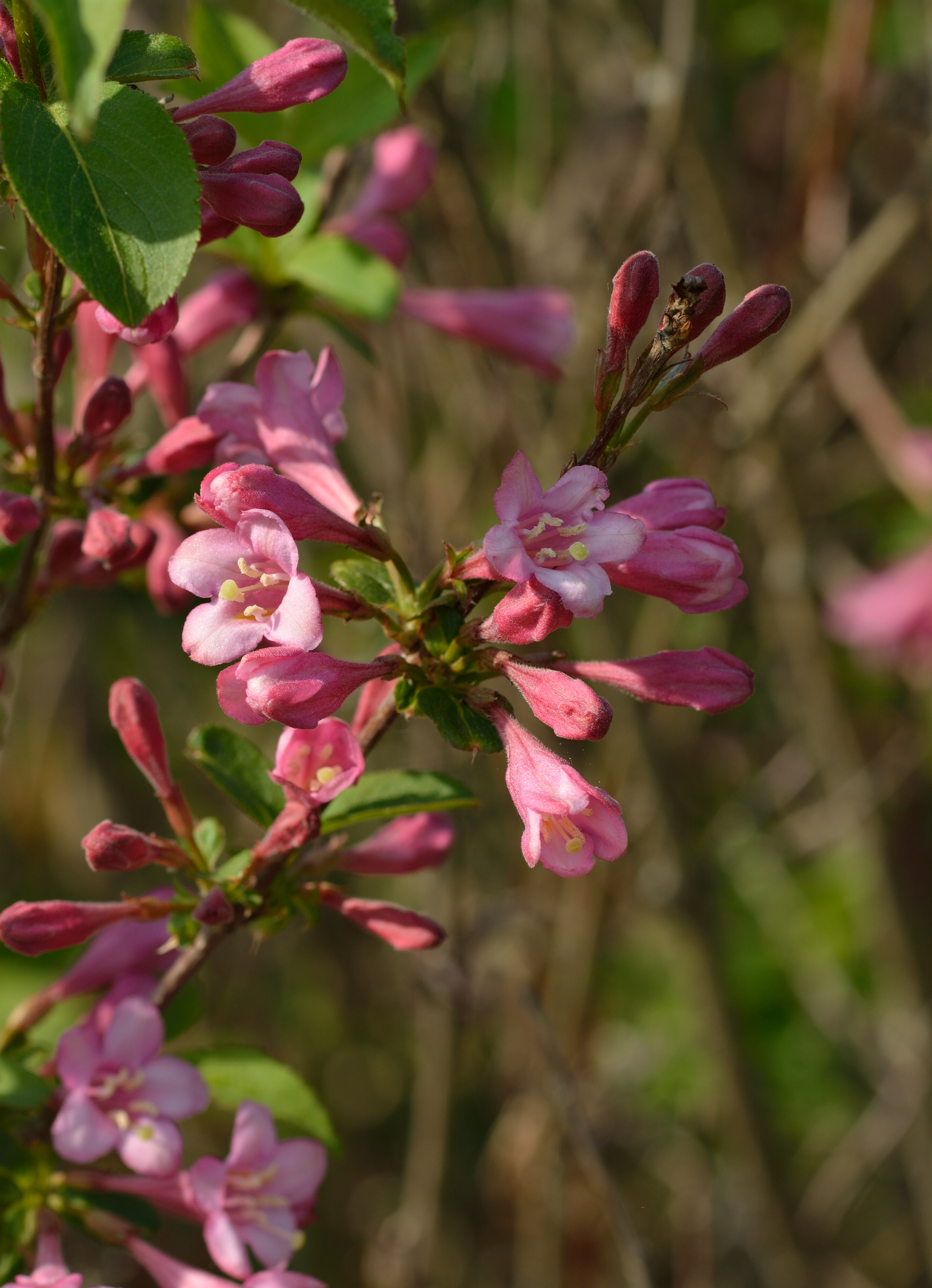
Weigela florida

Image	Scientific name	Distribution
	Weigela coraeensis Thunb.	Japan (E. Central Honshu)
	Weigela decora (Nakai) Nakai	Central & S. Japan
	Weigela floribunda (Siebold & Zucc.) K.Koch	Japan (W. & Central Honshu, Shikoku)
	Weigela florida (Bunge) A.DC.	S. Russian Far East to N. & E. China and Korea, Japan (Kyushu)
	Weigela × fujisanensis (Makino) Nakai	Japan (C. Honshu)
	Weigela hortensis (Siebold & Zucc.) K.Koch	Japan (Hokkaido, Honshu)
	Weigela japonica Thunb.	S. China, S. Japan
	Weigela maximowiczii (S.Moore) Rehder	Japan (N. & Central Honshu).
	Weigela middendorffiana (Carrière) K.Koch	Russian Far East to N. & N. Central Japan
	Weigela suavis (Kom.) L.H.Bailey	Russian Far East
	Weigela subsessilis (Nakai) L.H.Bailey	Korea

== Cultivation ==
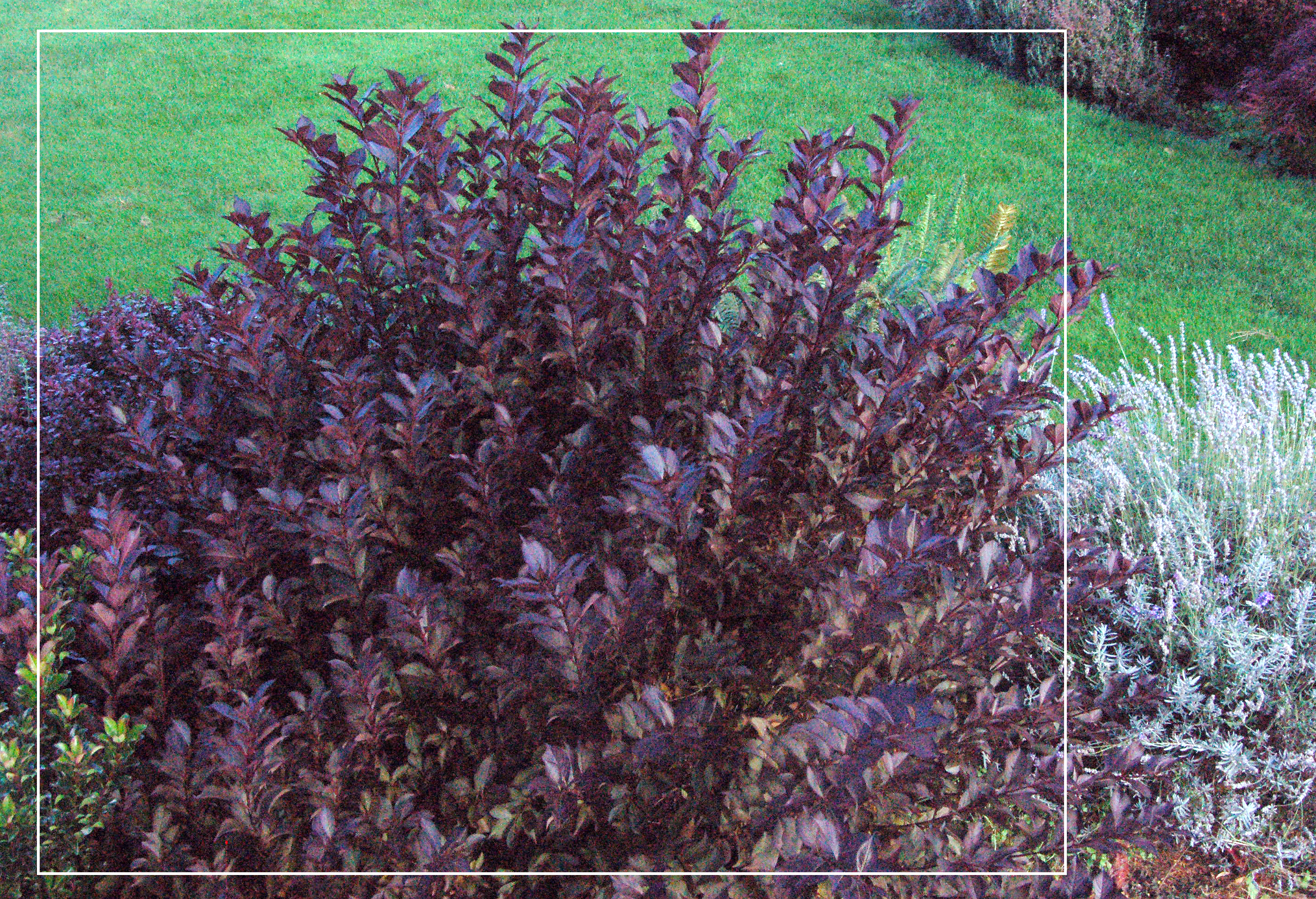
Weigela florida 'Wine & Roses'.

Several of the species are very popular ornamental shrubs in gardens, although species have been mostly superseded by hybrids (crosses between W. florida and other Asiatic species). The following cultivars have gained the Royal Horticultural Society's Award of Garden Merit:

- Weigela 'Red Prince'
- Weigela florida 'Alexandra'
- Weigela 'Florida Variegata'
- Weigela 'Praecox Variegata'

'Pink Princess' is a popular cultivar of Weigela, a shrub native to northern China, Korea, and Japan, that flowers profusely. It is a hardy plant, easy to grow and maintain. It grows to a height and width of up to 1.5–1.8 m (5–6 ft) in appropriate conditions, and is thus more compact than the normal Weigela florida, which makes it a more versatile shrub. It is attractive to hummingbirds and bees.

== Gallery ==
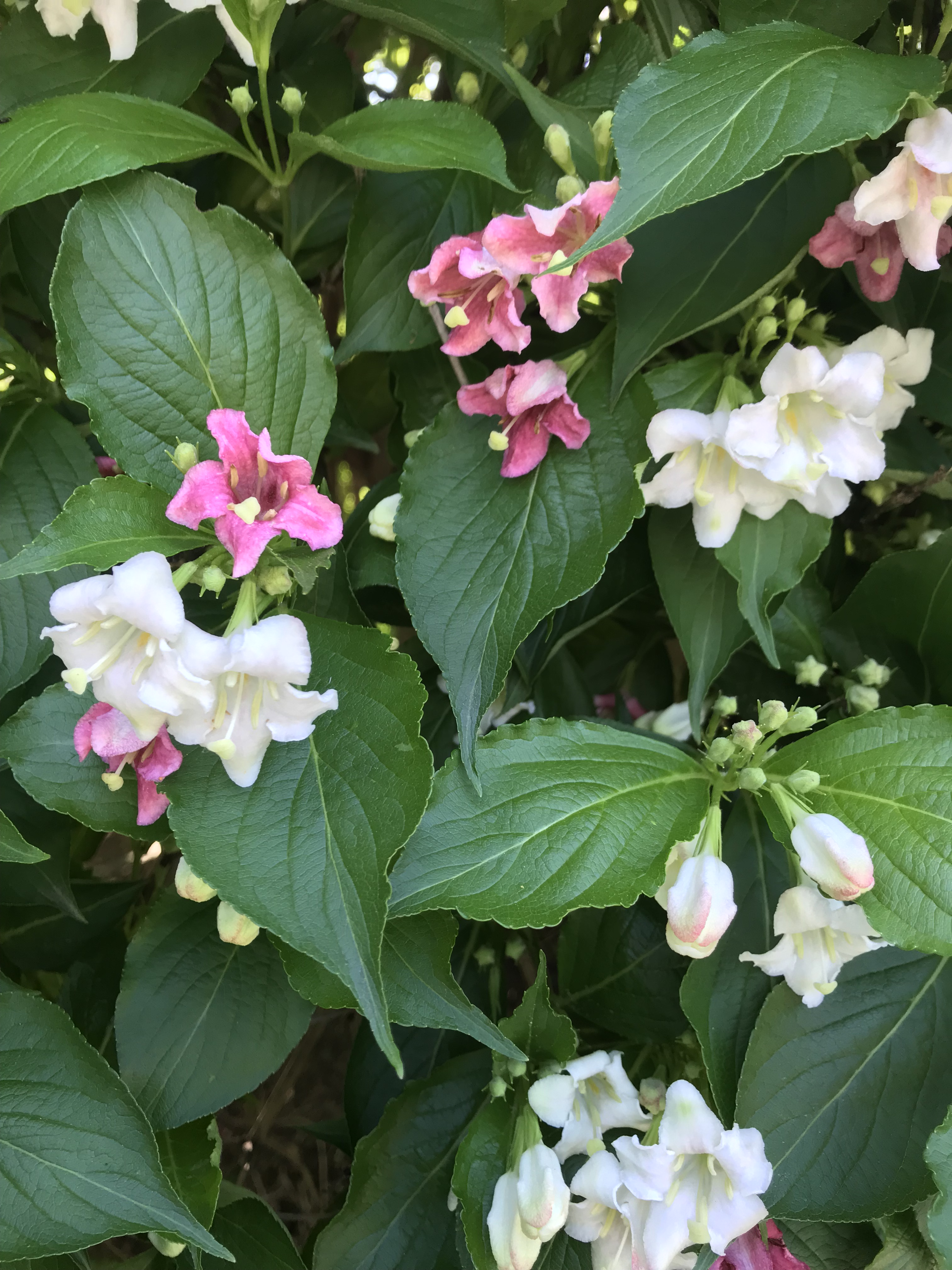

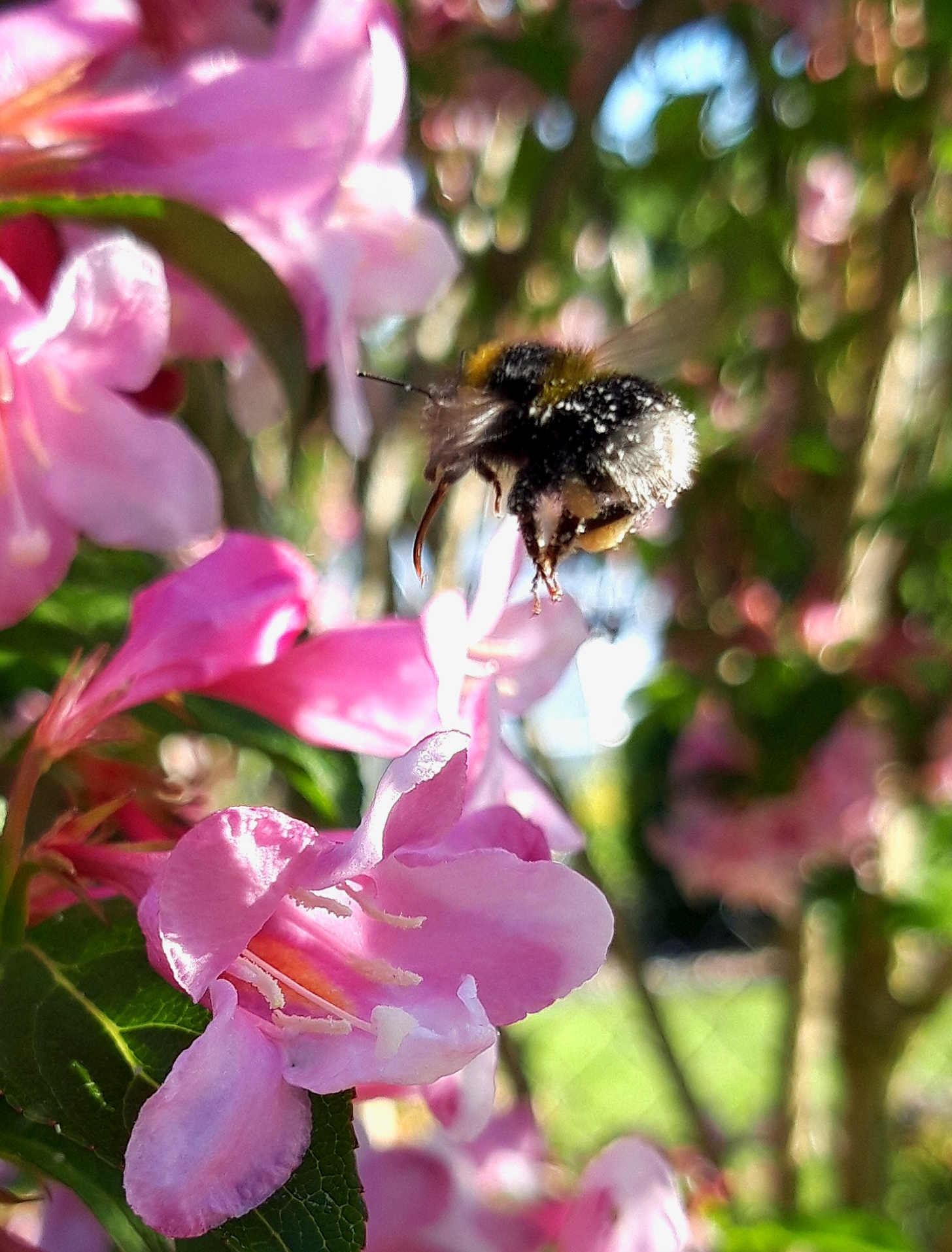

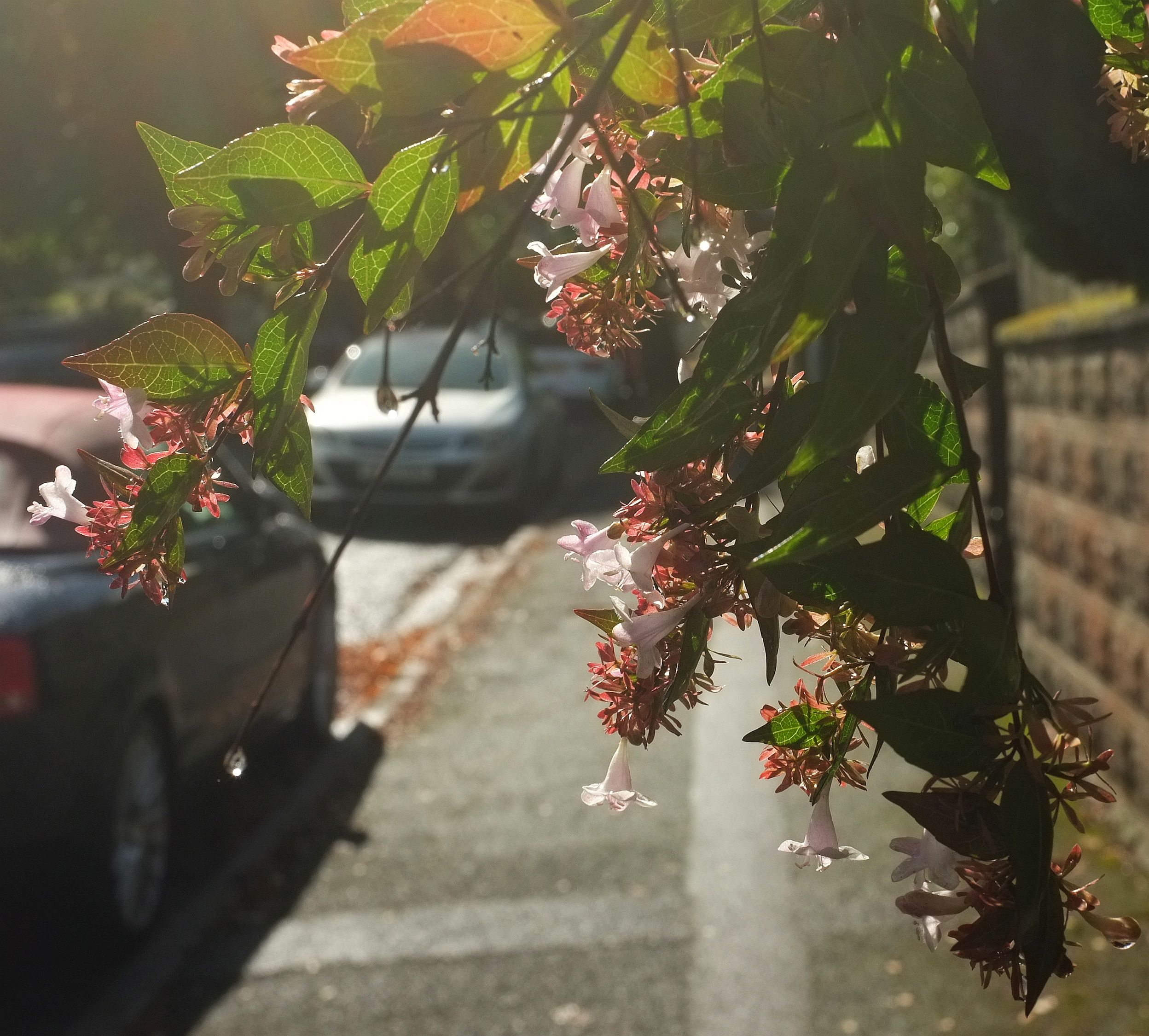

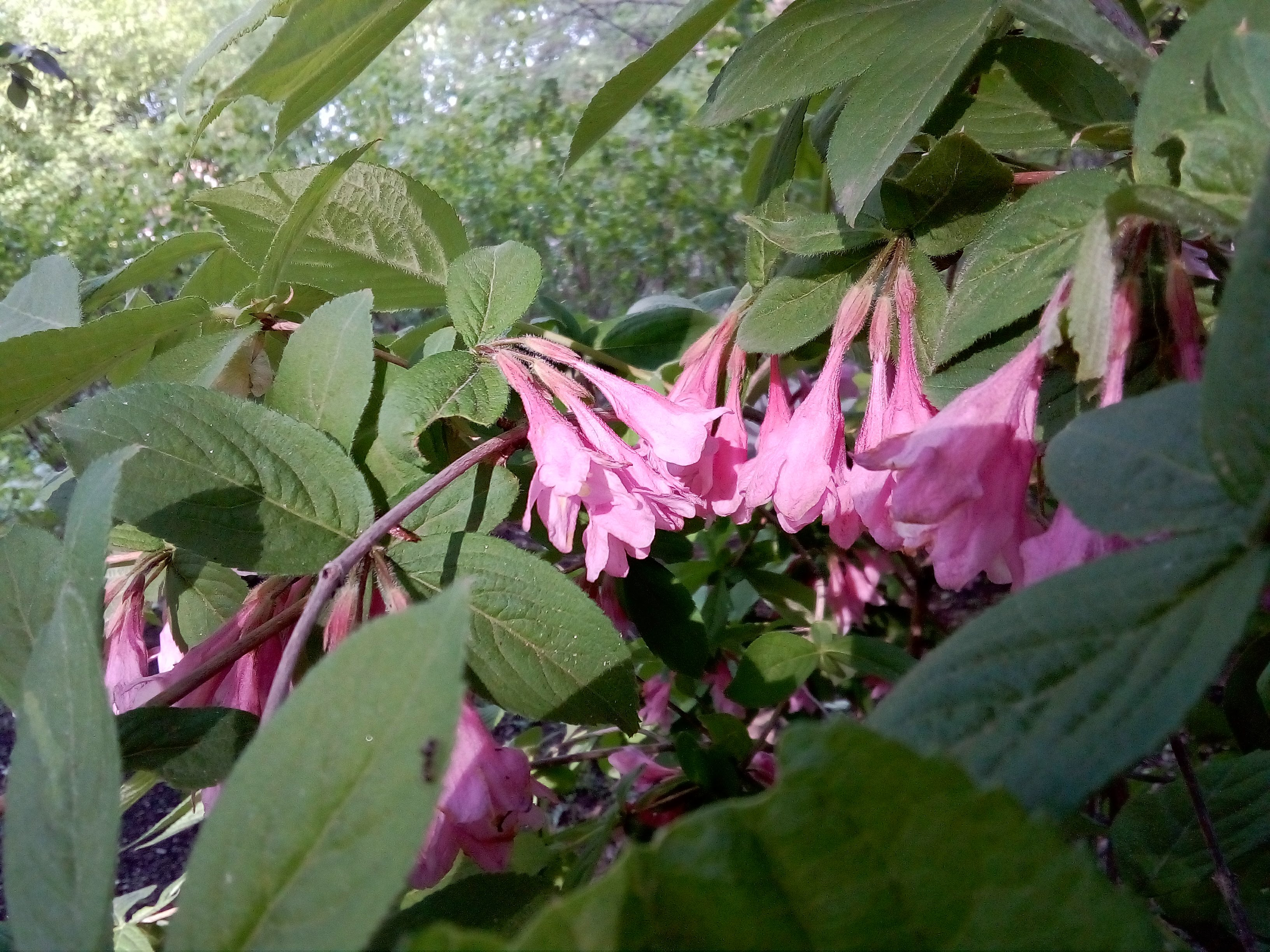

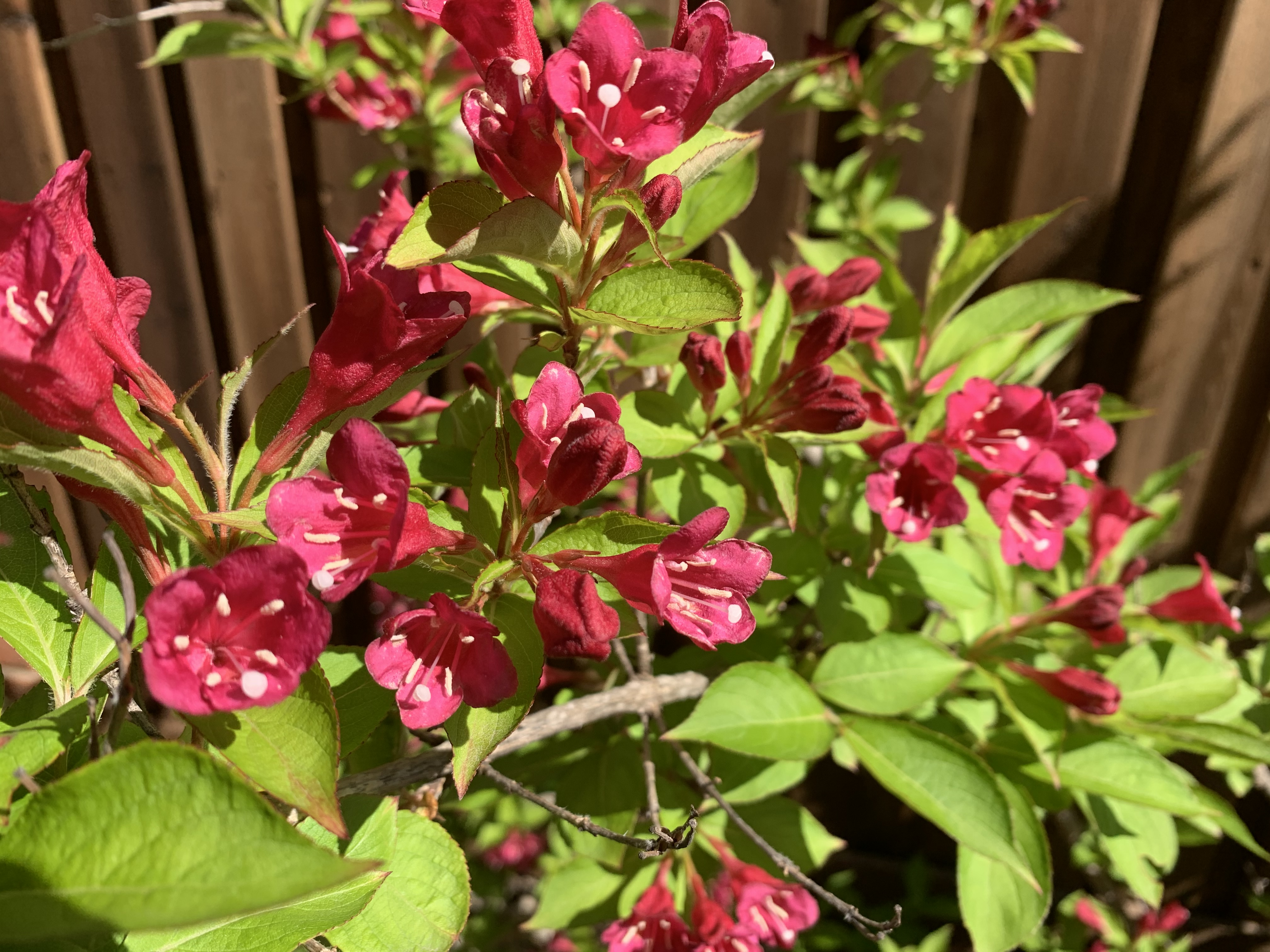

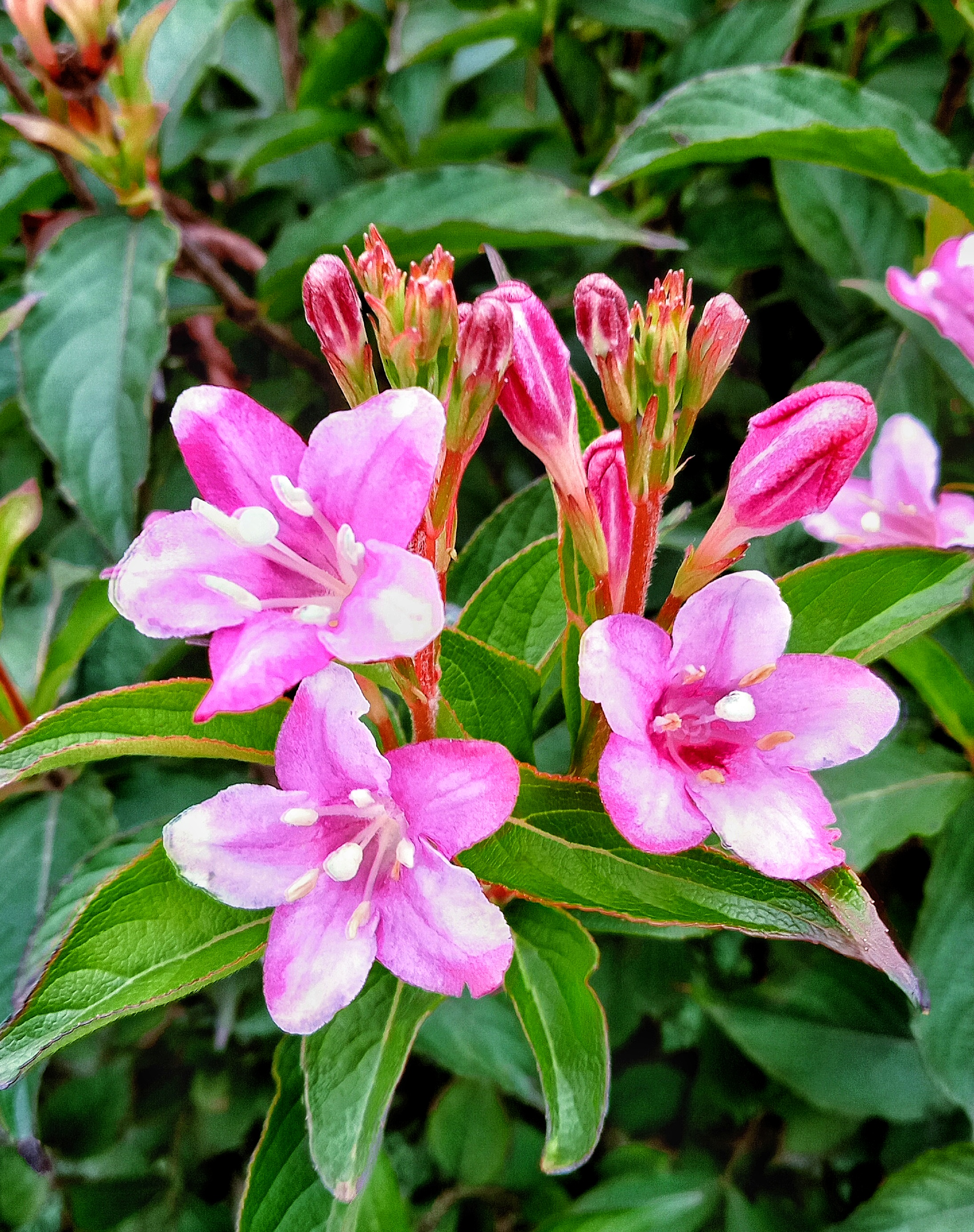
Flower of weigela
