= National Register of Historic Places listings in Riley County, Kansas =

Location of Riley County in Kansas

This is a list of the National Register of Historic Places listings in Riley County, Kansas.

This is intended to be a complete list of the properties and districts on the National Register of Historic Places in Riley County, Kansas, United States. The locations of National Register properties and districts for which the latitude and longitude coordinates are included below, may be seen in a map.

There are 45 properties and districts listed on the National Register in the county.

This National Park Service list is complete through NPS recent listings posted September 25, 2026.

== Current listings ==
	Name on the Register	Image	Date listed	Location	City or town	Description
1	Alten-Peak House	Alten-Peak House	March 17, 2025 (#100009707)	2040 Fort Riley Boulevard; 39°10′25″N 96°35′25″W	Manhattan	
2	Anderson Hall	Anderson Hall	November 28, 1980 (#80001471)	Kansas State University campus 39°11′19″N 96°34′50″W	Manhattan	
3	The Avalon	The Avalon	September 30, 2019 (#100004453)	417 Fremont St. 39°11′01″N 96°33′45″W	Manhattan	
4	Bethel A.M.E. Church	Bethel A.M.E. Church	May 30, 2012 (#12000301)	401 Yuma St. 39°10′30″N 96°33′44″W	Manhattan	
5	Bluemont Youth Cabin	Bluemont Youth Cabin	January 8, 2014 (#13001044)	NE. of 5th & Bertrand Sts. in Goodnow Park; 39°11′30″N 96°33′46″W	Manhattan	Part of the New Deal-Era Resources of Kansas MPS
6	Community House	Community House	November 21, 2006 (#06001051)	120 N. 4th St. 39°10′55″N 96°33′42″W	Manhattan	
7	Dawson's Conoco Service Station	Dawson's Conoco Service Station	September 30, 2021 (#100007027)	1026 Poyntz Ave. 39°10′47″N 96°34′23″W	Manhattan	
8	Downtown Manhattan Historic District	Downtown Manhattan Historic District	October 2, 2007 (#06001240)	Generally including the blocks between Humboldt and Pierre Sts. from 3rd to 5th Sts. 39°10′44″N 96°33′42″W	Manhattan	
9	Mattie M. Elliot House	Mattie M. Elliot House	June 2, 1995 (#95000672)	600 Houston St. 39°10′42″N 96°33′55″W	Manhattan	
10	First Christian Church	First Christian Church	March 10, 2022 (#100007029)	115 Courthouse Plz. 39°10′49″N 96°33′49″W	Manhattan	
11	First Congregational Church	First Congregational Church	November 13, 2008 (#08001068)	700 Poyntz Ave. 39°10′46″N 96°34′02″W	Manhattan	
12	Leslie A. Fitz House	Leslie A. Fitz House	June 8, 2005 (#05000543)	1014 Houston St. 39°10′43″N 96°34′21″W	Manhattan	
13	F.B. Forrester House	F.B. Forrester House	September 27, 2021 (#100007022)	410 North Juliette Ave. 39°10′58″N 96°33′59″W	Manhattan	
14	Goodnow House	Goodnow House	February 24, 1971 (#71000326)	2301 Claflin Rd. 39°11′34″N 96°35′44″W	Manhattan	
15	Grimes House	Grimes House	May 9, 1997 (#97000409)	203 North Delaware Ave. 39°10′58″N 96°35′14″W	Manhattan	
16	Hartford House	Hartford House	September 30, 2019 (#100004452)	2309 Claflin Rd. 39°11′35″N 96°35′47″W	Manhattan	
17	Houston and Pierre Streets Residential Historic District	Houston and Pierre Streets Residential Historic District	February 18, 2009 (#09000031)	Bounded by S. 5th St., Pierre St., S. 9th St., and Houston St. 39°10′40″N 96°34′01″W	Manhattan	
18	Samuel D. Houston House	Samuel D. Houston House	January 17, 2007 (#06001246)	3624 Anderson Ave. 39°11′20″N 96°37′50″W	Manhattan	
19	Hulse-Daughters House	Hulse-Daughters House	June 27, 2007 (#07000601)	617 Colorado St. 39°10′41″N 96°33′59″W	Manhattan	
20	Jesse Ingraham House	Jesse Ingraham House	January 8, 2014 (#13001045)	1724 Fairchild Ave. 39°11′03″N 96°35′04″W	Manhattan	Part of the Late 19th Century Vernacular Stone Houses in Manhattan, Kansas MPS
21	KSAC Radio Towers	KSAC Radio Towers	August 27, 1983 (#83000437)	Kansas State University campus 39°11′13″N 96°34′53″W	Manhattan	
22	Kansas Farm Bureau Headquarters		April 13, 2026 (#100012904)	2323 Anderson Avenue; 39°11′20″N 96°35′58″W	Manhattan	
23	Francis Byron (Barney) Kimble House	Francis Byron (Barney) Kimble House	October 2, 2015 (#15000691)	720 Poyntz Ave. 39°10′46″N 96°34′04″W	Manhattan	
24	Landmark Water Tower	Landmark Water Tower	October 4, 2017 (#100001704)	Sunset Ave. & Leavenworth St. 39°10′52″N 96°35′19″W	Manhattan	
25	Lyda-Jean Apartments	Lyda-Jean Apartments	April 28, 2004 (#04000368)	501 Houston St. 39°10′48″N 96°33′50″W	Manhattan	
26	Manhattan Carnegie Library Building	Manhattan Carnegie Library Building	June 25, 1987 (#87000970)	5th St. and Poyntz Ave. 39°10′46″N 96°33′48″W	Manhattan	
27	McFarlane-Wareham House	McFarlane-Wareham House	July 21, 2004 (#04000724)	1906 Leavenworth St. 39°11′01″N 96°35′13″W	Manhattan	
28	Persons Barn and Granary	Persons Barn and Granary	January 22, 2009 (#08001351)	2103 K-18 (Zeandale Road); 39°09′16″N 96°30′33″W	Manhattan	On the Lazy T Ranch
29	Pioneer Log Cabin	Pioneer Log Cabin	February 3, 2020 (#100002969)	405 N 11th St. (Manhattan City Park); 39°10′53″N 96°34′31″W	Manhattan	
30	Jeremiah Platt House	Jeremiah Platt House	May 20, 1981 (#81000281)	2005 Claflin Rd. 39°11′33″N 96°35′23″W	Manhattan	
31	Rex Arms Apartments	Rex Arms Apartments	December 19, 2025 (#100012438)	1531 Leavenworth Street; 39°10′54″N 96°34′53″W	Manhattan	
32	Riley County Courthouse	Riley County Courthouse	November 15, 2005 (#05001249)	100 Courthouse Plaza; 39°10′54″N 96°33′47″W	Manhattan	
33	Rocky Ford School	Rocky Ford School	January 20, 2012 (#11001033)	1669 Barnes Rd. 39°13′44″N 96°35′01″W	Manhattan	
34	Damon Runyon House	Damon Runyon House	December 2, 2004 (#04001282)	400 Osage St. 39°11′04″N 96°33′43″W	Manhattan	
35	Second Baptist Church	Second Baptist Church	May 30, 2012 (#12000302)	831 Yuma St. 39°10′30″N 96°34′12″W	Manhattan	
36	Seven Dolors Catholic Church	Seven Dolors Catholic Church	September 1, 1995 (#95001054)	Northeast of the junction of Juliette and Pierre Sts. 39°10′39″N 96°33′57″W	Manhattan	
37	Strasser House	Strasser House	July 6, 2010 (#10000431)	326 Laramie St. 39°11′05″N 96°33′41″W	Manhattan	
38	Robert Ulrich House	Robert Ulrich House	September 20, 1978 (#78001287)	121 N. 8th St. 39°10′49″N 96°34′06″W	Manhattan	
39	Viking Manufacturing Company Building	Viking Manufacturing Company Building	September 27, 2022 (#100008245)	1531 Yuma St. 39°10′31″N 96°34′53″W	Manhattan	
40	Daniel and Maude Walters House	Daniel and Maude Walters House	October 17, 2012 (#12000868)	100 S. Delaware Ave. 39°10′46″N 96°35′13″W	Manhattan	
41	E. A. and Ura Wharton House	E. A. and Ura Wharton House	June 20, 1995 (#95000740)	608 Houston St. 39°10′50″N 96°33′56″W	Manhattan	
42	Wolf House Historic District	Wolf House Historic District	March 7, 2019 (#100003425)	630 Fremont St. 39°11′01″N 96°33′59″W	Manhattan	
43	Woman's Club House	Woman's Club House	November 28, 1980 (#80001472)	900 Poyntz Ave. 39°10′46″N 96°34′13″W	Manhattan	
44	Young Buck Site		January 27, 2015 (#14001211)	Address Restricted	Manhattan vicinity	
45	Yuma Street Historic District	Yuma Street Historic District	January 3, 2023 (#100008518)	931 Yuma St, and 900 blk. of Yuma St. 39°10′31″N 96°34′16″W	Manhattan	

== See also ==
- List of National Historic Landmarks in Kansas
- National Register of Historic Places listings in Kansas
