= Sunset Zoo =

- Interactive map of Sunset Zoo
- 39.1773°N 96.5960°W
- Date opened: 1933
- Location: 2333 Oak Street; Manhattan, Kansas, United States
- No. of animals: 330+
- No. of species: 105
- Memberships: AZA
- Public transit: ATA Bus
- Website: sunsetzoo.com

Sunset Zoo, also known as Sunset Zoological Park, is the city zoo of Manhattan, Kansas and houses over 300 animals representing more than 100 species.

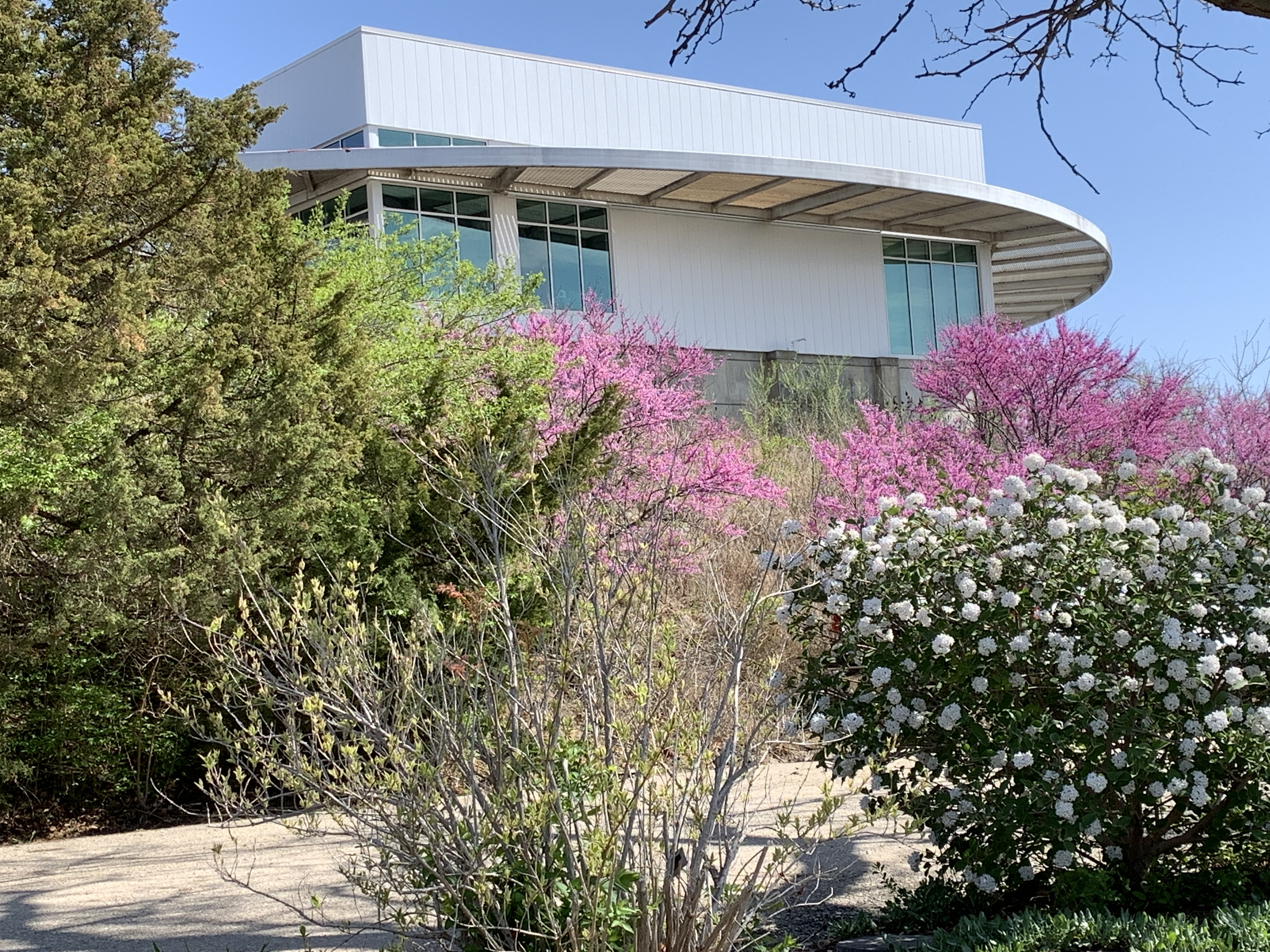
The Nature Exploration Center at Sunset Zoo

== History ==
In 1929, the city of Manhattan purchased a land called Sunset Cemetery. A part of the land was not used to bury people because of rocky soil. This area was converted into the Sunset Zoo by the government. Until 1934, the zoo was not chartered as a park, but there were animals at the zoo as since 1930. The zoo was officially founded in 1933.

Dr. E.J. Frick, founder of the zoo and a former Head of Surgery and Medicine at the Kansas State University School of Veterinary Medicine, volunteered to acquire, provide care for, and display animals for 43 years. The city received its original funding from the Works Progress Administration (WPA) for the initial construction of animal exhibits, buildings and walkways. Much of this original native limestone work has been preserved, serving as educational examples of social history, and remains part of the zoo's Master Plan.

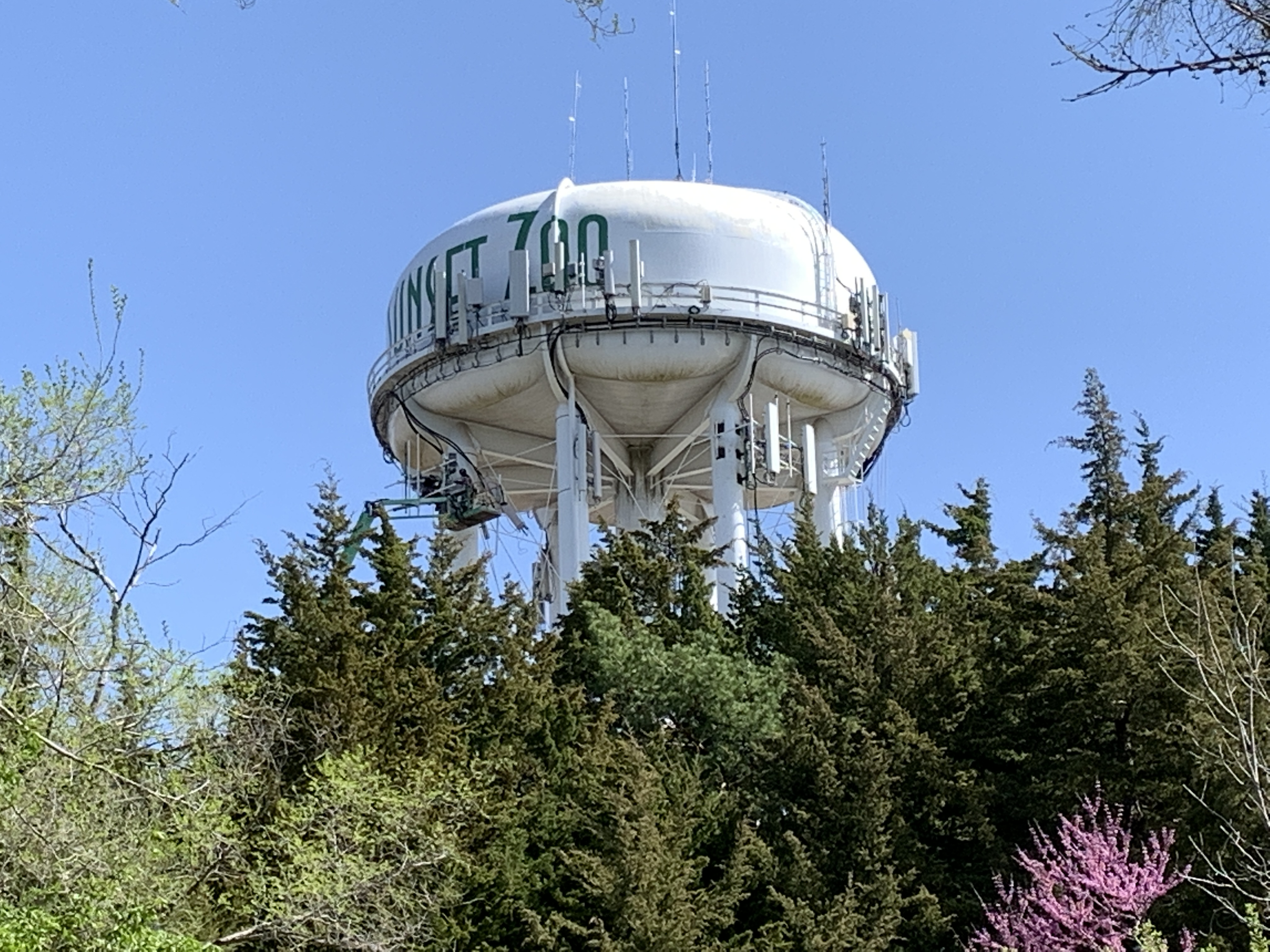
Water tower at Sunset Zoo

In 1980, the citizens of Manhattan encouraged the City Commission to build a modern zoo. This led to the development of a Zoo Master Plan and city approval to charge a small admission fee. The revenue generated from admissions is used for new construction, renovations, improvements, and maintenance. Sunset Zoo applied for and received, accreditation by the American Zoo and Aquarium Association (AZA) in 1989.

== Animals and exhibits ==
=== African Trail ===
- Eastern black-and-white colobus
- Chimpanzee
- Violet turaco
- Cheetah
- Spotted hyena
- Okapi

=== Australian Walk-About ===
- Emu
- Black swan
- Cattle egret
- Chestnut teal
- Laughing kookaburra
- Silver gull
- Straw-necked ibis
- Parma wallaby
- Red-necked wallaby

=== Kansas Plains ===
- Raccoon
- Swift fox
- Bald eagle
- Bobcat
- American kestrel
- Turkey vulture
- Black-tailed prairie dog

=== Trails of South America ===
- Maned wolf
- Giant anteater
- American flamingo
- Chacoan peccary
- American white pelican
- Canada goose
- Crested screamer
- Indian peafowl
- Ruddy duck
- White-faced whistling duck
- Red-eared slider
- Red-footed tortoise
- Cuvier's dwarf caiman
- Reed titi monkey
- Geoffrey's marmoset
- Green and black poison dart frog
- Yellow and blue poison dart frog
- Llama
- Nigerian Dwarf goat
- Pot-bellied pig

=== Expedition Asia ===
- Malayan tiger
- Sloth bear
- Red-crowned crane
- Western tufted deer
- Amur leopard
- Cinereous vulture
- Chukar partridge
- Golden pheasant
- Asian small-clawed otter
- Red panda
- Lar gibbon
