= Marianna Kistler Beach Museum of Art =

Coordinates: 39°11′12.56″N 96°34′43.81″W

- Location: Manhattan, Kansas, U.S.
- Type: University museum
- Website: beach.k-state.edu

The Marianna Kistler Beach Museum of Art is an art museum on the Kansas State University campus, located near Aggieville. Admission is free to the general public. The museum houses KSU's permanent art collection of Kansas and regional artists, as well as hosting special and traveling exhibitions. The museum's collection is accessible on-line and includes works by important Kansas artists John Steuart Curry, Patricia Duncan, Birger Sandzén, William Dickerson, and Gordon Parks. In 2003, the museum published an overview of selected works in its permanent collection.

The museum offers a wide range of educational and public programming, including early childhood and family programs, public and school tours, and programs for K-State students. The grounds include the Hummel Family Meadow, a small native plant garden which serves as a focus for STEAM learning.

The museum opened in 1996, and a new wing was completed in 2006. The Beach Museum of Art is accredited by the American Alliance of Museums.
