= Freedom's Frontier National Heritage Area =

United States National Heritage Area in Kansas and Missouri

- Location within the United States Freedom's Frontier National Heritage Area (Kansas) Freedom's Frontier National Heritage Area (Missouri)
- Coordinates: 38°45′N 95°0′W
- Country: United States
- States: Kansas and Missouri
- Counties: 41 counties in Eastern Kansas and Western Missouri
- Established: October 12, 2006

Government
  - Body: FFNHA Board of Trustees

Area
  - Total: 31,021 sq mi (80,340 km^{2})

Freedom's Frontier National Heritage Area, Inc. (FFNHA) is a federally designated U.S. National Heritage Area located in eastern Kansas and Western Missouri. This heritage area preserves, conserves, and interprets historic and cultural landscapes pertaining to: the shaping of the frontier, the Missouri-Kansas Border War, and the enduring struggle for freedom. FFNHA was authorized on October 12, 2006, with the passage of the National Heritage Areas Act of 2006. The management plan for the heritage area was approved by the Board of Trustees on June 10, 2009, and undergoes official review by the National Park Service to ensure it complies with all components required within the enabling legislation.

== Mission and Themes ==
The focus of the FFNHA is to share the stories of 19th century Americans and their definitions and struggles with freedom. Many of the sites focus on the Bleeding Kansas and American Civil War years, but there are several locations that deal with 20th century events and the ecology of Kansas and Missouri. According to the FFNHA's website:

Freedom's Frontier is a “story ecosystem” defined by the history that unifies the region. The overarching theme of FFNHA is Freedom. Each of the three sub-themes connects to the ideal of freedom and clearly states why the area's resources and values are important enough to warrant federal designation of the area. The main sub-theme is the Missouri Kansas Border War, consisting of interpretations of the years of uneasy balance established by the Missouri Compromise leaving the territory's future slave status in the hands of settlers and ushering in the Civil War. Additional sub-themes include Shaping the Frontier, interpreting this place where river travel ended and traders, miners, and emigrants began the long overland treks beyond Missouri's western border, pushing Native American populations aside in the process, and the Enduring Struggles for Freedom, interpreting stories of this place that has inspired national policies and ongoing efforts to secure equal freedoms for all Americans.

The FFNHA also gives out several grants and awards as well as supporting educators with additional curriculum and scholarships.

== Historic Sites ==
There are several notable historic sites located in the FFNHA.

- Mahaffie Stagecoach Stop and Farm
- Battle of Island Mound State Historic Site
- Amelia Earhart Birthplace Museum
- Pony Express National Museum
- Negro Leagues Baseball Museum
- Black Archives of Mid-America
- National Frontier Trails Museum
- Constitution Hall State Historic Site – Lecompton
- Watkins Museum
- Flint Hills Discovery Center
- National World War I Museum and Memorial
- Marais des Cygnes Massacre State Historic Site

=== National Park Service sites ===
- Brown v. Board of Education National Historic Site
- Fort Larned National Historic Site
- Fort Scott National Historic Site
- Harry S. Truman National Historic Site
- Oregon National Historic Trail
