= E. A. and Ura Wharton House =

Historic house in Kansas, United States

- U.S. National Register of Historic Places
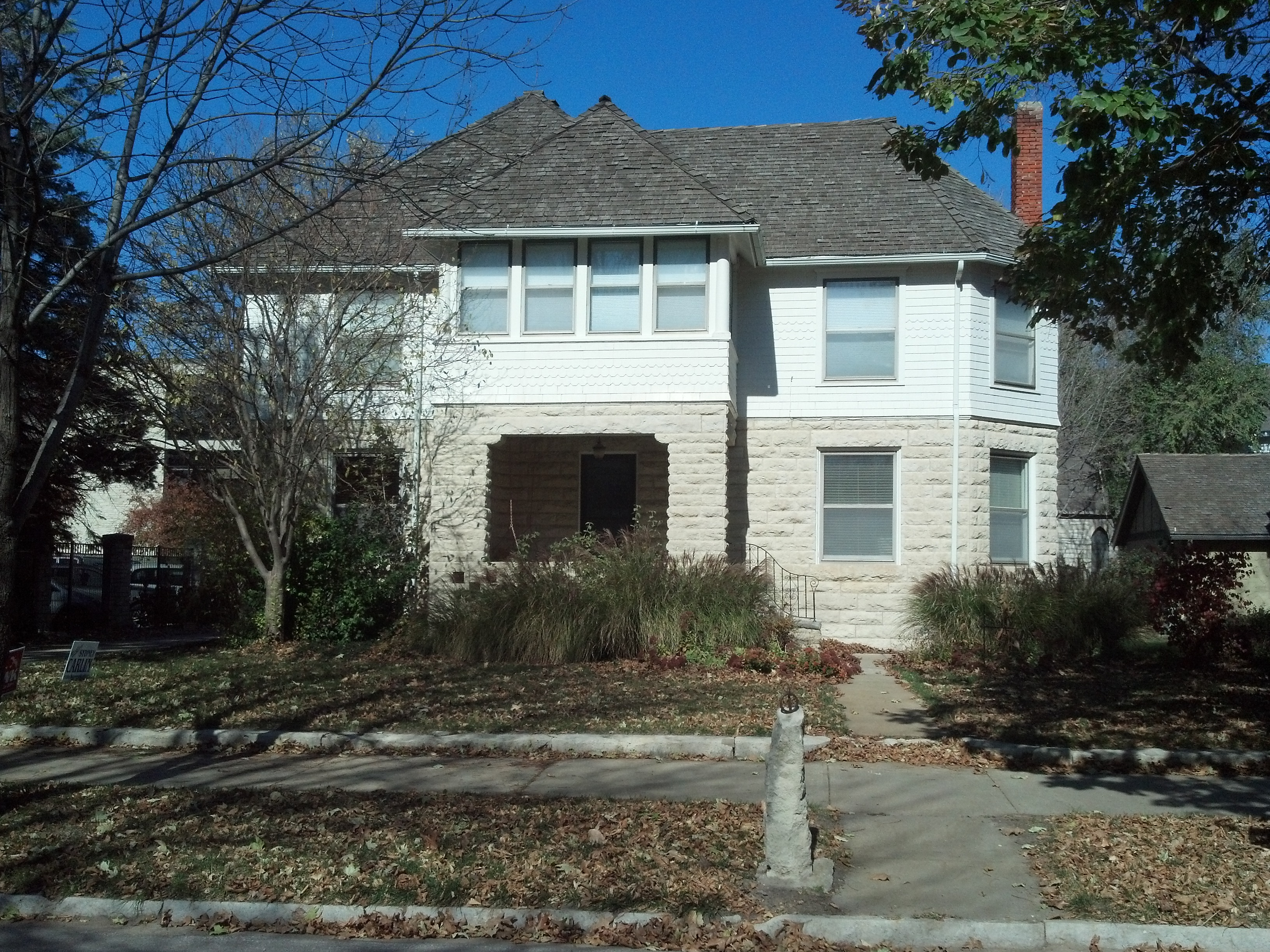

- Location within Kansas Location within the United States
- Location: 608 Houston Street, Manhattan, Kansas
- Coordinates: 39°10′50″N 96°33′56″W
- Area: 1 acre (0.40 ha)
- Built: 1897
- Architectural style: Late 19th and Early 20th Century American Movements
- NRHP reference No.: 95000740
- Added to NRHP: June 20, 1995

The E. A. and Ura Wharton House in Manhattan, Kansas was built in 1897 for Edward Augustus and Ura Burgoyne (née Higinbotham) Wharton and added to the U.S. National Register of Historic Places (NRHP) in 1995.

The first story of the home is built of native limestone, from a quarry owned by William and Edward Ulrich. Wharton moved to Manhattan from Pennsylvania in 1880; his wife was a native of Manhattan. He opened the New Dry Goods Store on April 1, 1887, and operated the business until he sold it in 1909. Wharton was also active in local politics. He was elected one of three trustees of Manhattan Institute on January 15, 1903, and was elected March 26, 1903 to represent Ward IV on the Manhattan City Council.

E. A. Wharton died in 1939 and Ura died in 1941. The house was willed to Ura's sister, Lillian M. Greene with the stipulation that it was to be given to the Christian Scientist Church of Manhattan upon Lillian's death. Lillian died in 1955 and the house was used by the Christian Scientist congregation until their own building was completed in 1956. The house was then purchased by Helen and Alex McManis in Autumn 1956; Helen McManis was listed as the owner when the NRHP request was filed in April 1995.

It has been speculated that J. D. Walters, professor of architecture at Kansas State Agricultural College (KSAC) was the architect, but no evidence exists to prove this speculation. His involvement with the construction of the Wharton House is inferred in a 1902 article from The Industrialist (the KSAC student newspaper), wherein he has taken his students in his class to view the "model residence of Mrs. Wharton's. The students were delighted with the perfect arrangement of modern conveniences of the beautiful home, and voted it the best arranged home they had ever seen."

== See also ==
- National Register of Historic Places listings in Riley County, Kansas
- National Register of Historic Places listings in Kansas
