= Jeremiah Platt House =

Historic house in Kansas, United States

- U.S. National Register of Historic Places
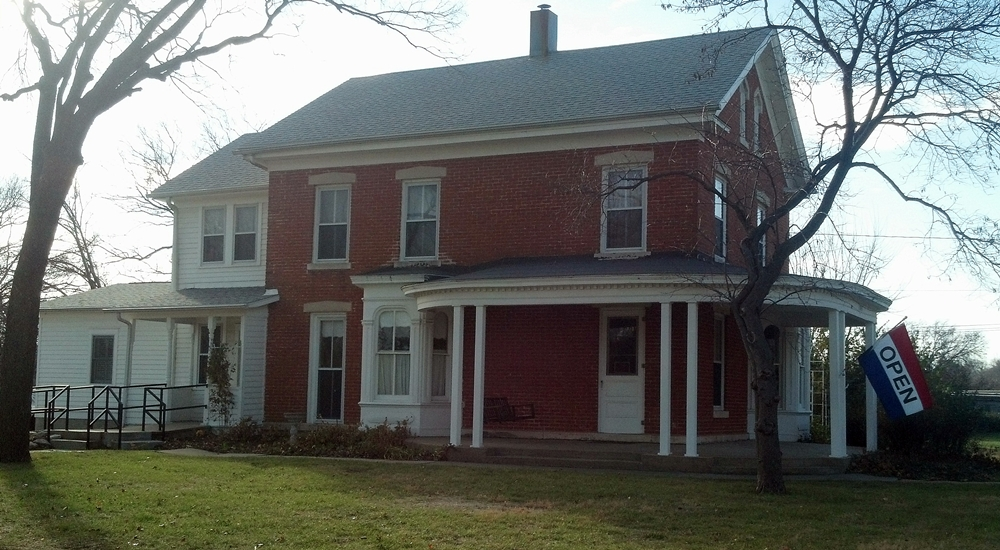

- Location within Kansas Location within the United States
- Location: 2005 Claflin Road, Manhattan, Kansas
- Coordinates: 39°11′33″N 96°35′23″W
- Area: .25 acres (0.10 ha)
- Built: 1871
- Architectural style: vernacular
- NRHP reference No.: 81000281
- Added to NRHP: May 20, 1981

The Jeremiah Platt House in Manhattan, Kansas was built in 1871 and added to the U.S. National Register of Historic Places in 1981.

Jeremiah Everts Platt (1833–1899), a Connecticut native, was an early professor at Kansas State Agricultural College, employed at the college in 1864. Platt served as the first head of the preparatory department and professor of vocal music; he later taught mathematics and English. Although conferred with an honorary A.M. in 1872 by the college's board of regents, his outspoken support for prohibition led the regents to demand his resignation in 1889.

Ordained as a minister in the Congregational Church in 1888, Platt left KSAC in 1889 and traveled throughout Kansas establishing Sunday schools. He and his wife subsequently continued this work in Oklahoma, where he is credited with establishing 150 Sunday schools.

Platt purchased ten acres land in Manhattan in September 1867. The Manhattan Nationalist reported on October 13, 1871, that "Prof. Platt's new house is just enclosed and will be finished by the end of the term. It is of brick, two stories, with light limestone trimmings and is built in the best manner."

The house remained Platt's property while he lived in Oklahoma, 1893–1899, but was rented out. Platt died in 1899 and the house passed to his widow Jennie, who returned to Manhattan and resided at the house until 1904 when she sold it to Anna Neider for $3,000. Neider sold the property in 1917 and it was subsequently transferred by sale five times before being purchased by Roy T. and Alice Hulshizer in 1925. The Hulshizer's ran a tea room in the house for three years before selling it in 1928 to Andrew Ekdahl. The house remained in the Ekdahl family until 1965 when it was transferred to the Board of Riley County Commissioners. From 1965 through 1980, the house was used as dispatch headquarters for the county's ambulance service.

In 1980, the Board of Riley County Commissioners transferred the property to the Riley County Genealogical Society, which has continuously maintained its headquarters and library there following minor renovations to the interior and exterior of the building.

What is most unusual about the house is the use of brick in its construction, instead of limestone and wood as most houses in Manhattan were built during this time. Platt's brother-in-law, William Harrison Smith, was a builder who also owned a brickyard in nearby Junction City. Although no evidence remains to definitively prove that Smith assisted in any way with the construction of Platt's house, the circumstantial evidence is strong.

== See also ==
- National Register of Historic Places listings in Riley County, Kansas
- National Register of Historic Places listings in Kansas
