= Manhattan Town Center =

- Coordinates: 39.17944°N 96.55909°W
- Address: 100 Manhattan Town Center; Manhattan, Kansas 66502
- Opened: October 26, 1987
- Developer: Forest City Enterprises
- Manager: CBRE Group
- Owner: RockStep Capital
- Num. of stores: 60+
- Num. of anchor tenants: 3
- Floor area: 378,480 square feet (35,162 m^{2})
- Floors: 1
- Public transit: ATA Bus
- Website: manhattantowncenter.com

Manhattan Town Center is a single-level enclosed shopping mall located in downtown Manhattan, Kansas. Opened in 1987, it has three anchors: Dillard's, JCPenney, and the AMC Dine-In Manhattan 13 IMAX movie theater.

On November 15, 2023, the mall was acquired by RockStep Capital.

== History ==
Early proposals for an enclosed shopping center in Manhattan date back to 1971, when Topeka developer John Haley revealed plans to construct a mall on the southwest edge of Manhattan at the intersection of K-113 and K-18 that would come to be known as the Landmark Mall. Haley encountered pushback from city officials, and the project ultimately failed to materialize. The proposed site of the Landmark Mall was eventually developed as the Seth Child Commons open-air strip center, anchored by Target, in the early 2000s. Meanwhile, the Manhattan City Commission at least acknowledged the possibility of a major shopping mall located downtown when it decided to condemn and demolish a half-block of buildings and replace them with off-street parking.

Manhattan Town Center's Dillard's store opened on October 7, 1987 followed by the remainder of the mall, including the second anchor, JCPenney, on October 26, 1987. The third anchor, Sears, was later added to the south end of the mall and opened on September 17, 1990. In 2014, Sears closed amidst the company's widespread financial struggles. The vacant Sears store was demolished and replaced by the Carmike Cinemas Town Center 13 movie theater (with 12 regular screens and one IMAX), which opened in December 2016. It was subsequently renamed following AMC Theatres' acquisition of Carmike.

As of January 2026, Manhattan Town Center's retail tenants include original anchors Dillard's (73,000 sq. ft.) and JCPenney (49,691 sq. ft.) as well as other national retailers including Books-A-Million, Buckle, Famous Footwear, Hot Topic, Kay Jewelers, Maurices, Victoria's Secret, and Ulta Beauty. In February 2019, mall officials announced that H&M planned to open an 18,000 sq. ft. store in the mall, the chain's first Kansas location outside of the Kansas City or Wichita areas. The mall property also includes four full-service restaurants: HuHot Mongolian Grill, Applebee's, Chili's, and Texas Roadhouse. In addition to retail, the mall also hosts various community functions including Manhattan High School's prom.
