= George Floyd protests in Kansas =

2020 civil unrest after the murder of George Floyd

- Part of George Floyd protests
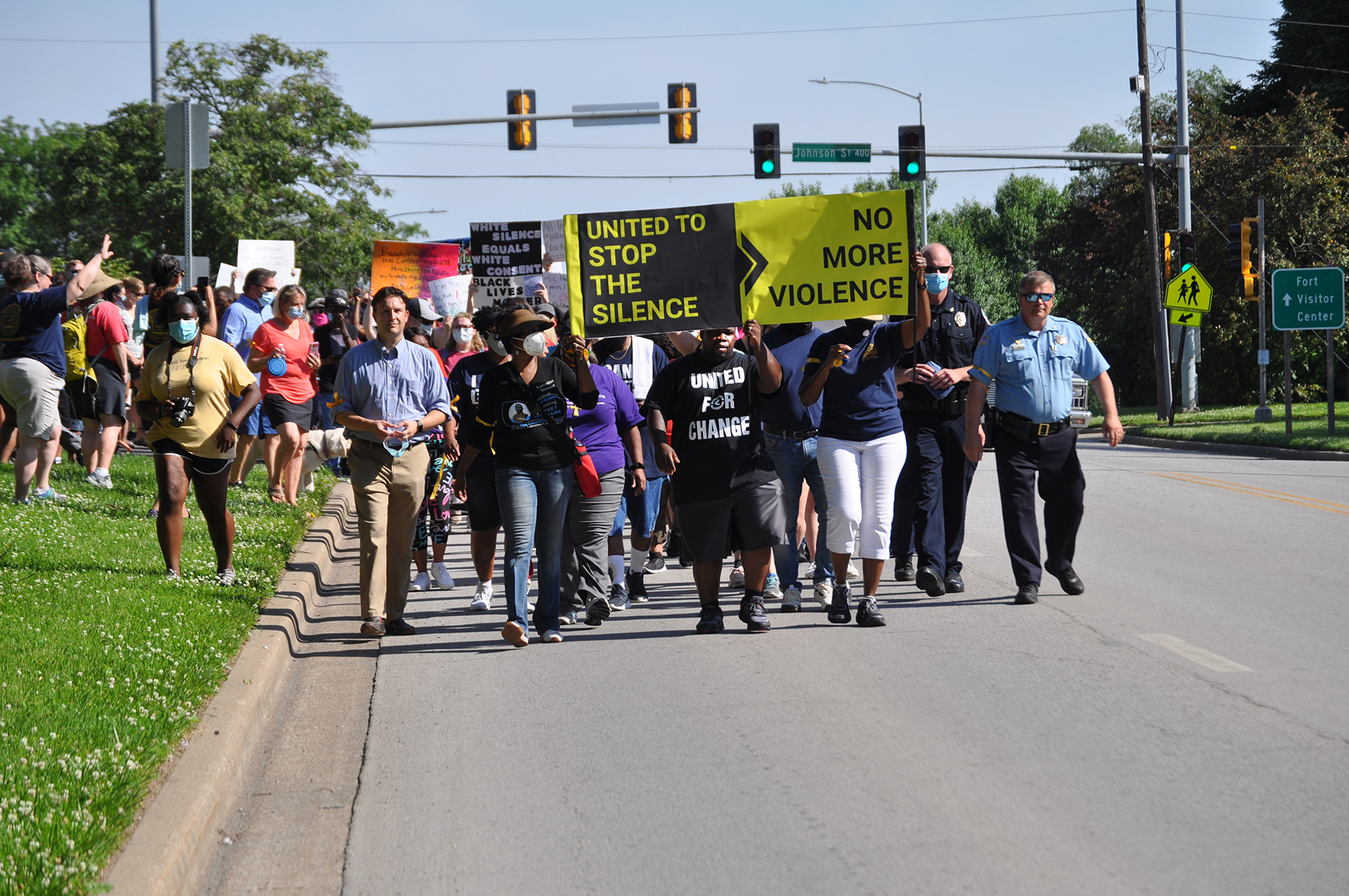
- A protest in Leavenworth in June 2020
- Date: May 28 – July 24, 2020 (1 month, 3 weeks and 5 days)
- Location: Kansas, United States
- Caused by: Police brutality; Institutional racism against African Americans; Reaction to the murder of George Floyd; Economic, racial and social inequality

This is a list of George Floyd protests in Kansas, United States. Protests occurred in at least fifteen various communities in the state through July 2020.

== Locations ==
=== Coffeyville ===
About 200 people attended a protest on the campus of Coffeyville Community College on June 4.

=== Derby ===
On June 3, around 150 people held a peaceful protest at the intersection of Madison and Rock.

=== Fort Scott ===
On May 31, several people protested at the intersection of National Avenue and U.S. Highway 69, and the following day a larger protest was held on the front steps of Memorial Hall.

=== Great Bend ===
On June 1, a group of young people organized a protest at the courthouse square.

=== Hays ===
On May 31, around 120 people gathered near 27th and Vine St. for a peaceful protest.

=== Hutchinson ===
On May 31, several hundred people gathered in front of the court house for a peaceful protest.

=== Lawrence ===
On May 31, several hundreds of people peacefully marched down Massachusetts Street. On June 27, a graphic banner depicting George Floyd was discovered on Massachusetts Street leading to subsequent social disturbances.

=== Leavenworth ===
On June 6, residents gathered for a Unity Walk that started at the Richard Allen Cultural Center and ended at Bob Dougherty Park.

=== Kansas City ===
On May 30 and 31 protests took place in Kansas City, Kansas as well as nearby Kansas City, Missouri. As of June 7, protesters had been gathering in Kansas for ten consecutive days.

=== Manhattan ===
On May 30, protesters marched down Bluemont Avenue. A second protest at Triangle Park in Aggieville occurred June 1.

=== Olathe ===
On June 5, residents gathered at Olathe City Hall to remember George Floyd. A second protest took place on June 6 at the intersection of Santa Fe and Mur-Len Roads in honor of George Floyd.

=== Overland Park ===
A small group of people protested on the side of a street on July 24, and four people were arrested. In response, a second protest was held outside of the Overland Park mayor's home, this one with around 70 demonstrators.

=== Parsons ===
On June 6, demonstrators marched from City Hall to the Parsons Police Department for a prayer vigil.

=== Topeka ===
On May 30, about 500 people peacefully protested in front of the Kansas State Capitol.

=== Wichita ===
On May 30, nearly two thousand peaceful protesters marched around parts of Wichita before dispersing by the end of the day. Two more protests were held on June 2. The first began at 7:00 p.m. as demonstrators gathered at 21st and Maize in northwest Wichita and chanted peacefully. After four hours later, a firework mortar exploded and police arrived, declaring the protest an unlawful assembly. The crowd dispersed without any further violence. The second protest took place at 21st and Arkansas, where riot police and two armed counterprotesters stood by as protesters chanted against police violence. At 11:30 p.m., dozens of protesters stormed and looted a QuikTrip store, and police responded by declaring the protest an unlawful assembly and ordering the protesters to leave. Flash grenades and tear gas were deployed on looters and five arrests were made. Following the protest, city officials considered implementing a city-wide curfew, but ultimately decided not to.

=== Winfield ===
On May 30, twenty-five people protested in Winfield, and a second protest was organized for Friday June 5. Reportedly many black people stayed home out of fear.
