= Wildcat Creek (Kansas River tributary) =

Stream in Kansas, U.S.

Coordinates: 39°09′36″N 96°33′43″W

Wildcat Creek is a creek in Riley County, Kansas, which occasionally floods.

== Issues ==
Record flooding levels occurred within the city limits of Manhattan, Kansas, on June 16, 2010 that were surpassed on June 2, 2011, damaging homes, apartments, businesses, and recreational complexes in each instance.

The following appears in the Urban Waters Capacity-Building Grant Application submitted to the EPA's Targeted Watersheds Grant Program by Wildcat Creek Watershed Council (recently formed):

Wildcat Creek Watershed is located in Riley County, Kansas and covers 99.5 square miles (258 km^{2}) The targeted area of this application is 8 square miles (21 km^{2}) within the city limits of Manhattan, Kansas, with an urban population density of 7,000 to 8,000 persons per square mile. Rapid development in the urban area has resulted in substantial erosion, impaired water quality, endangered aquatic species and caused property damage and habitat loss. Many of the urban residents live in apartments or mobile home parks and are directly impacted by adverse water quality, flooding, and lowered property values.

Wildcat Creek has documented water quality problems. The watershed is listed as impaired (303d Kansas report) for nutrients (phosphorus), bacteria, and low levels of dissolved oxygen. In addition, Wildcat Creek and its tributaries are habitat for the Topeka Shiner, which is an endangered fish species that requires very specific water quality conditions for its survival. Flooding in the urban portions of the watershed has increased from a 1 in 20 year occurrence to almost an annual event. In 2010, a major flood event caused serious damage to and threatened human health of residents of lowest income and most vulnerable residents of the watershed. With the rapid rate of urbanization in the rural upstream areas watershed, it is expected that flooding frequency will increase unless a plan is developed and implemented.

== See also ==
- List of rivers of Kansas
