= Patricia DuBose Duncan =

American artist (1932–2021)

- Born: August 16, 1932; Nashville
- Died: September 17, 2021; Topsham
- Education: St. Louis School of Fine Arts
- Occupation: Artist
- Website: patriciaduboseduncan.com

Patricia DuBose Duncan (August 16, 1932 – September 17, 2021) was an American artist who lived in Topsham, Maine. She is best known for her work to gain support for designating some of the last remaining tall grass prairie land in the American Midwest, as the Tallgrass Prairie National Preserve. This land was publicized in a Smithsonian Traveling Exhibition (S.I.T.E.S.) in 1976-86 as a Bicentennial Exhibition. The exhibit has been digitally preserved by Kansas State University's Marianna Kistler Beach Museum of Art.

Duncan has paintings and photographs hanging in museums across the country, including the Smithsonian Institution in Washington, the Farnsworth Art Museum in Rockland, Maine, the Spencer Museum of Art in Lawrence, Kansas, the Marianna Kistler Beach Museum of Art in Manhattan, Kansas, and the Albrecht-Kemper Museum of Art in St. Joseph, Missouri.

== Background ==
Duncan was born in Nashville, Tennessee on August 16, 1932. Duncan lived with her family in El Dorado, Arkansas and then Roanoke, Virginia until 1944 when the family relocated to Philadelphia. In Philadelphia, Duncan attended the Philadelphia Museum School on a scholarship. Her family moved again, and she went to high school in St. Louis, Missouri. From 1950 to 1954, she attended St. Louis School of Fine Arts at Washington University in St. Louis where she received a Bachelor of Fine Arts degree focused on painting and printmaking.

Duncan married another graduate of the Washington University, Herb Duncan. He joined the Navy soon after the Korean War draft was enacted, and during his service, he was stationed in Newport, Rhode Island and Long Beach California. While in Long Beach, Duncan was invited "into a group show at the Long Beach Art Museum". Herb was stationed in Sasebo Japan in 1956. While there, Duncan studied woodblock printing and other artforms, with a focus on exploring Japanese aesthetics. This work led to her first one-person show, and exhibit in Sasebo, Japan in 1956. Returning to the states in 1957, Duncan studied at the Kansas City Art Institute of Art.

Duncan died in Topsham, Maine on September 17, 2021, at the age of 89.

== Career ==
=== Tallgrass Prairie National Preserve ===
Much of Duncan's work during the 1970s focused on the interests of the environmental movement. The Smithsonian Institution, with additional support from the Hallmark Corporation, commissioned Duncan to create a large traveling exhibit as part of their Smithsonian Institution Traveling Exhibition Service: "The Tallgrass Prairie: An American Landscape." This show traveled across the United States from 1976 to 1986 and visited 300 venues in all 50 states. The exhibit was largely responsible for creating public interest in the Tallgrass Prairie National Preserve in Kansas. Without Duncan's creation of the exhibit, and active lobbying of artists, journalists, public figures, and politicians the preserve likely would not have been created. Notably, she recruited noted photographer and Kansas native, Gordon Parks, to help her with the campaign. She also published a book of writings and photographs: Tallgrass Prairie: The Inland Sea.

=== Maine ===
Following a residency at the Maine Photographic Workshops, she moved to Maine in 1986 and established a studio in Belfast Maine. There she continued to work on photography and painting.

== Art collections ==
The personal papers of Patricia DuBose Duncan are housed in the Kenneth Spencer Research Library at the University of Kansas.

Kansas State University's Marianna Kistler Beach Museum also contains 98 works by Duncan. The Beach Museum of Art published a collection of her art, Taking Root: the Art of Patricia Dubose Duncan. The Beach Museum of Art also preserved the Smithsonian Traveling exhibit that helped create public support for the creating Tallgrass Prairie National Preserve.
