= Yuma Street Historic District =

Historic district in Kansas, United States

- U.S. National Register of Historic Places
- U.S. Historic district
- Location within Kansas Location within the United States
- Location: Yuma Street, Manhattan, Kansas
- Coordinates: 39°10′51″N 96°33′22″W
- Architect: John Walters
- NRHP reference No.: 100008518
- Added to NRHP: January 3, 2023

The Yuma Street Historic District in Manhattan, Kansas is a historic district which was listed on the National Register of Historic Places on January 3, 2023. It was a historic center for the Black community in Manhattan, emerging during the American period of racial segregation. The Yuma Street Historic District stands in the southern portion of Manhattan. It includes the Second Baptist Church, United Service Organization, Douglass Park, Douglass School, and Shepard Chapel.

== History ==
Yuma Street has been a center for the Black community in Manhattan since the late 1870s when the first organizations and framed buildings started appearing. It's churches have consistently been an integral institutional centerpiece that brought the Black community together. The Yuma Street Historic District contains three such churches that have been an anchor of support for the local Black community. It also includes the Douglass School, once an elementary school for Black children during segregation, and a former United Service Organization building that was for Black soldiers' recreation.

Many buildings in the historic district were designed by architect Dr. John Walters, who was better known for his buildings on the campus of Kansas State University.
