= Mahaffie House =

Historic house in Kansas, United States

- J. B. Mahaffie House
- U.S. National Register of Historic Places

- Location within Kansas Location within the United States
- Location: 1100 Kansas City Road, Olathe, Kansas
- Coordinates: 38°53′31″N 94°48′4″W
- Built: 1857
- NRHP reference No.: 77000583
- Added to NRHP: August 29, 1977

The Mahaffie Stagecoach Stop and Farm Historic Site, locally known as the Mahaffie Farm, is located in Olathe, Kansas. The house was originally a stop along the Westport Route of the Santa Fe, Oregon, and California Trails, which originated in nearby Westport, Missouri. The house's heyday came with large numbers of westbound travelers of the 1860s.

The house has now been converted into a museum and gift shop. It is situated on almost 40 acres (160,000 m^{2}) of land. It frequently hosts American Civil War reenactments, with a focus on events connected to Bleeding Kansas and bushwhackers. There is also an in-house blacksmith and other various era-specific artisans.

The original farm was founded by James Beatty Mahaffie and his wife Lucinda, in 1858. They ran it until 1870 and stayed on the farm until 1886. The existing house was completed by Mahaffie in 1865. It includes two foot thick limestone blocks quarried from the farm itself.

The Mahaffies left their name not only on the museum, but on a street in Olathe, Mahaffie Elementary School, and on a recent subdivision.
