= Flint Hills Discovery Center =

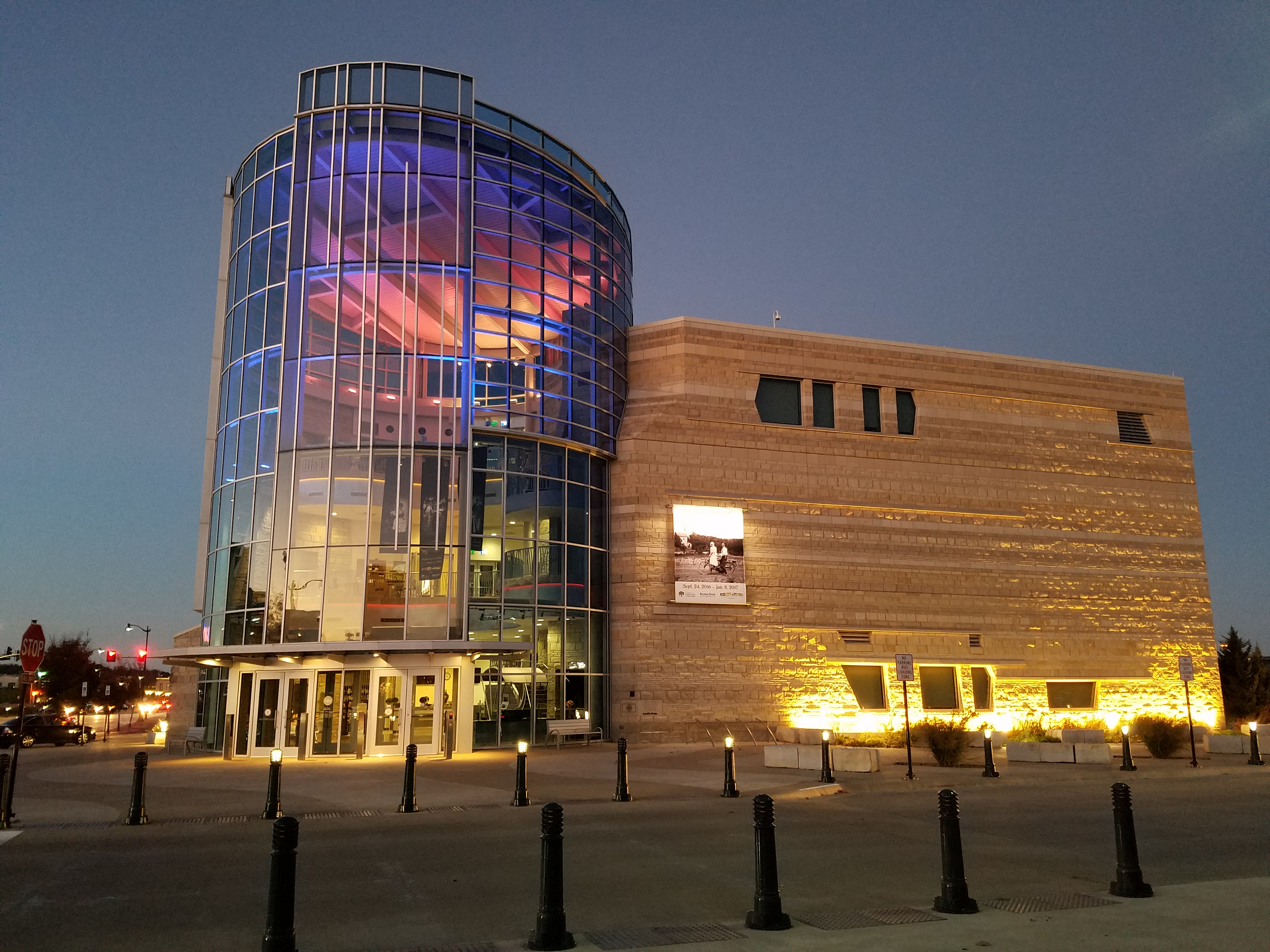
- Established: April 14, 2012
- Location: 315 S. 3rd St., Manhattan, Kansas 66502
- Coordinates: 39.177°N 96.560°W
- Type: Heritage center, Science center
- Website: flinthillsdiscovery.org

The Flint Hills Discovery Center is a municipal heritage and science center located in the city of Manhattan, Kansas. Featured within the facility are exhibits detailing local history and preservation of the Flint Hills, a theater, a specialized interactive playground for youth and parents, and a temporary exhibition gallery. The facility also promotes various educational outreach programs for youth and adults and serves as a venue for special events.

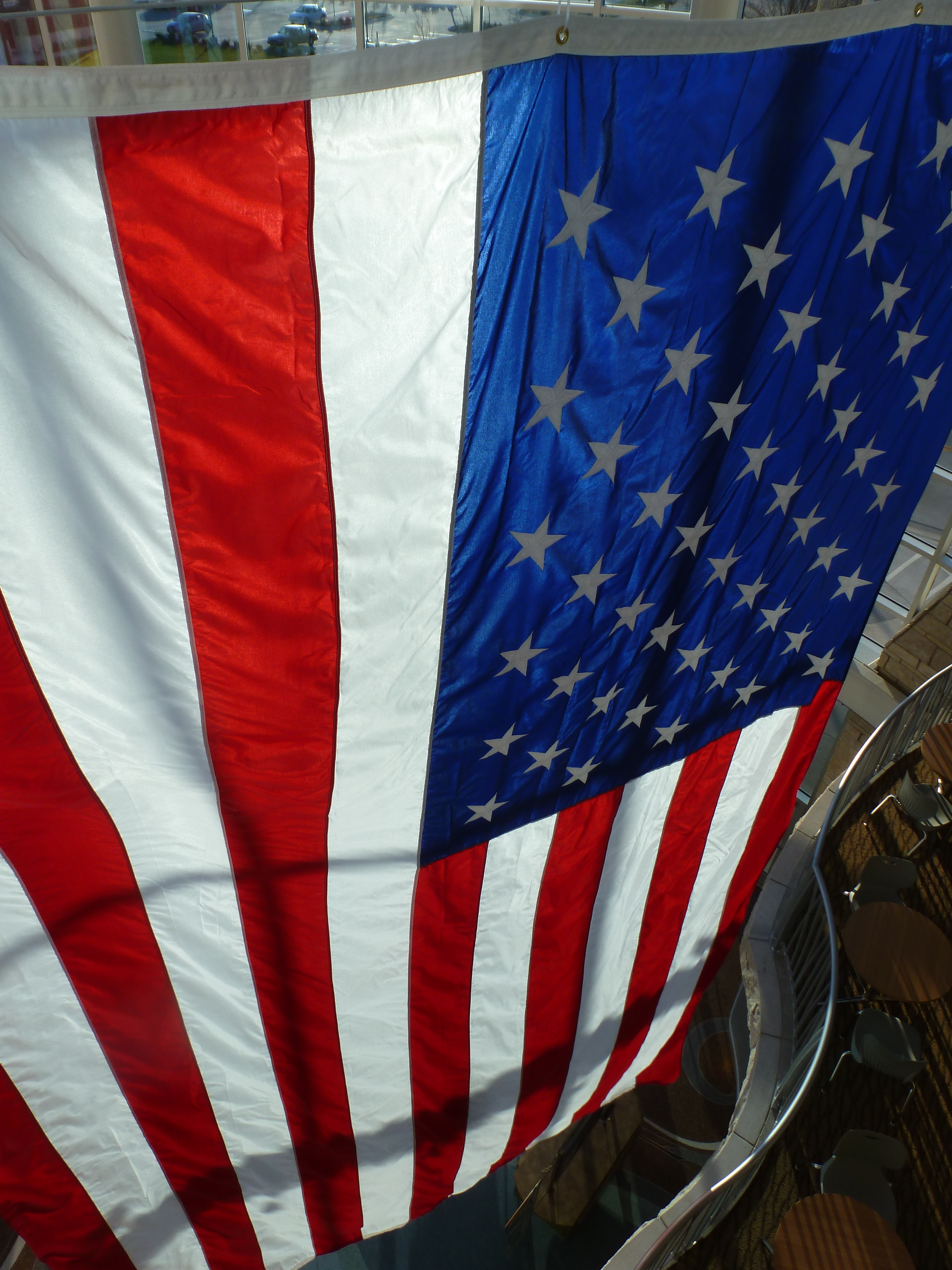
Flag displayed at the Flint Hills Discovery Center

== Exhibits ==
The Flint Hills Discovery Center features exhibits that explore the ecology, history, and culture of the Flint Hills in Kansas and Oklahoma. It also hosts traveling and temporary exhibits on related themes. The permanent exhibits are arranged in nine topical zones including an immersive theater experience.

=== Main-floor exhibits zones ===
- Shaping Winds and Water - a brief overview of the geologic formation of the area and the eventual formation of the grasslands.
- Blowing Winds in a Tallgrass prairie - details on biological diversity on the grasslands and how local flora and fauna contribute to the area.
- The Underground Forest - details on the biologic diversity within the soils, how soils come to be and how they are maintained.
- Winds of the Past - an overview of native North American settlers and their interaction with the Flint Hills region over time.
- Where the Air is so Pure - an overview on the impact of European immigrants, the displacement and relocation of the native North Americans, and the increased land development for cattle ranching.
- Voices of the Flint Hills - a videographic editorial of the opinions from area citizens on numerous subjects including water use, wind power, controlled burning, and cultural inspiration within the region.

=== Tallgrass Prairie: Tides of Time ===
- The Horizon Ranch Flint Hills Immersive Experience Theater is an immersive theater that features Tallgrass Prairie: Tides of Time, a short introductory film that highlights the ecology, history, and culture of the Flint Hills. The film includes special effects to give the audience an elevated sensory immersion.

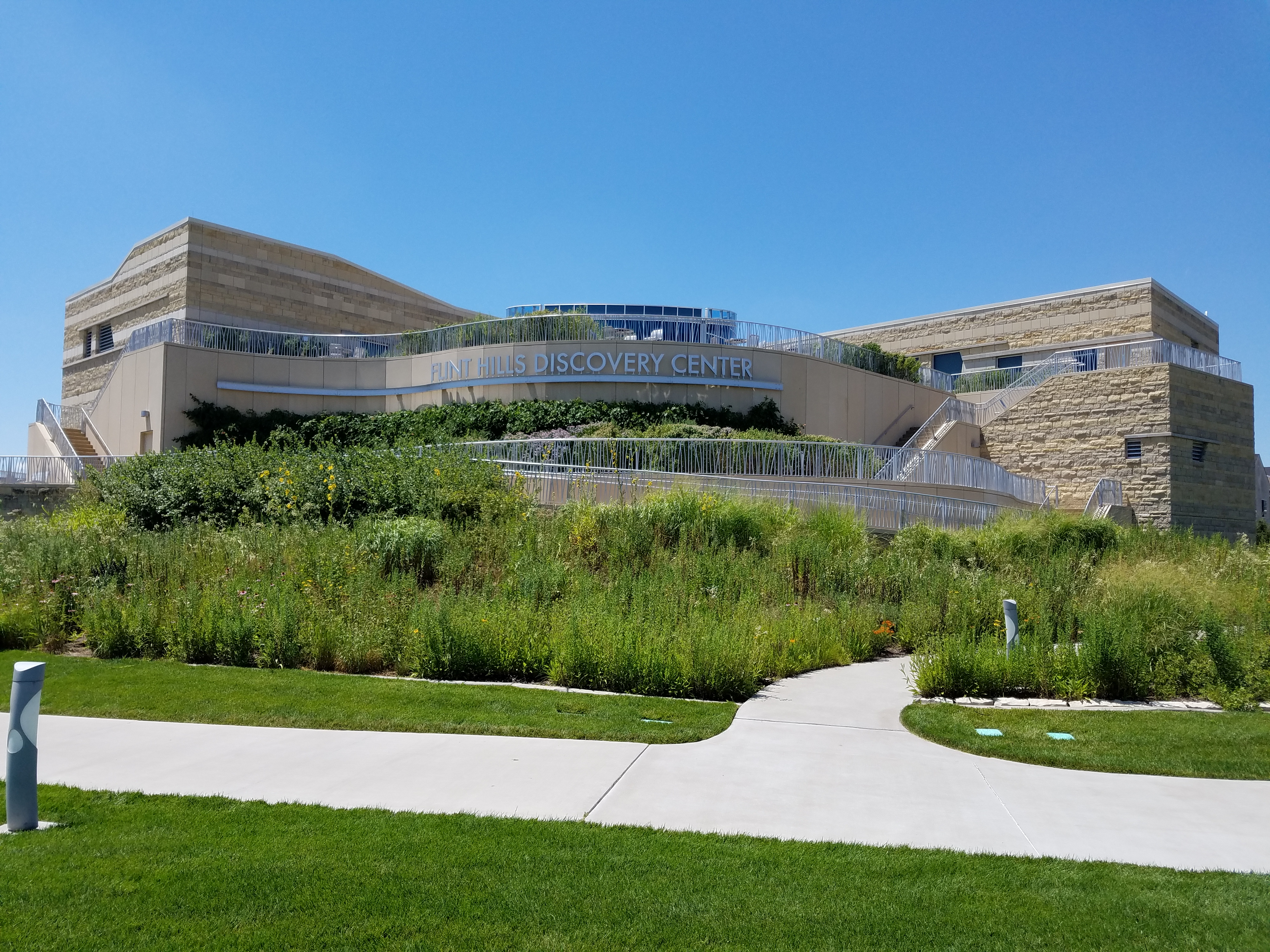
The Discovery Center features native prairie plants in its landscaping.

=== Second-floor exhibit zones ===
- Prairie Playscape - a specialized interactive playground for youth and parents that was renovated in 2022. It offers multiple interactive exhibits in three themed areas: exploring the land, working the land, and sharing the land.

=== Tallgrass Gallery ===
- The Tallgrass Gallery is a 2,000-square-foot (190 m^{2}) exhibition space that hosts a variety of traveling and in-house produced exhibits.

=== Prairie Garden Terrace and Trail ===
- An outdoor exhibit highlighting unique building and landscape features as well as topics important to the Flint Hills.

== Annual events ==
The Discovery Center hosts several annual events throughout the year

- Kansas Day - a celebration of Kansas on January 29
- Flint Hills Festival - festival focusing on the history, culture, and resources of the Flint Hills
- National Day of the Cowboy - celebration of the cowboy held on the fourth Saturday of July
- Community Day - free day held in August
- Breakfast with Santa - holiday event celebrated on the first two Saturdays in December
- Family New Year's Eve - family-friendly New Year's celebration on December 31
