= Manhattan, Kansas =

City in Kansas, United States

- City and County seat
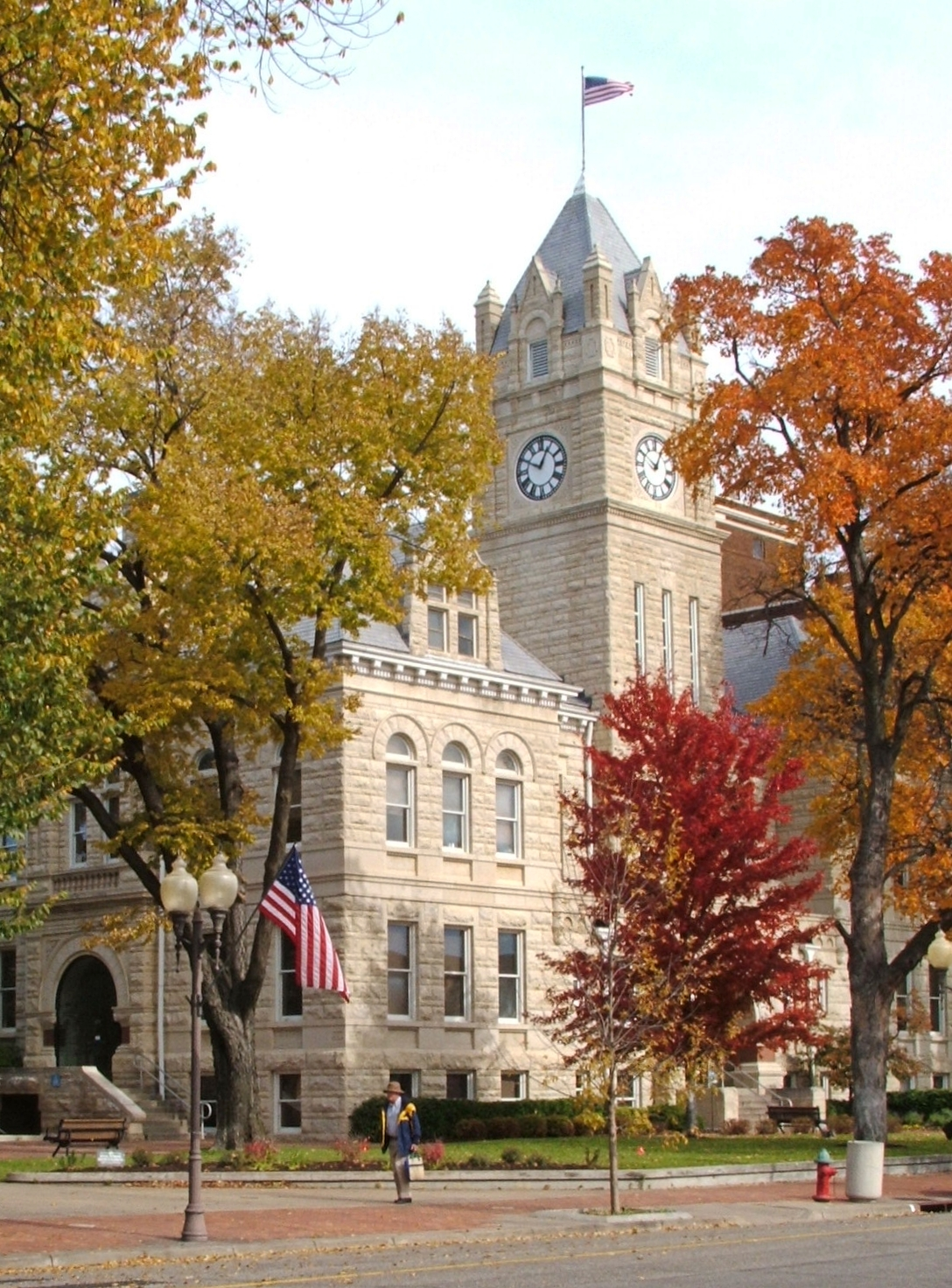
- Riley County Courthouse (2005)

- Flag
- Nicknames: The Little Apple, MHK
- Location within Riley County and Kansas
- Interactive map of Manhattan, Kansas
- Coordinates: 39°11′19″N 96°36′17″W
- Country: United States
- State: Kansas
- Counties: Riley, Pottawatomie
- Founded: 1855
- Incorporated: 1857
- Named for: Cincinnati–Manhattan Company

Government
  - Type: Commission-Manager
  - Mayor: Susan Adamchak

Area
  - City and County seat: 19.91 sq mi (51.56 km^{2})
  - Land: 19.85 sq mi (51.40 km^{2})
  - Water: 0.062 sq mi (0.16 km^{2})
  - Metro: 18.88 sq mi (48.89 km^{2})
- Elevation: 1,056 ft (322 m)

Population (2020)
  - City and County seat: 54,100
  - Density: 2,730/sq mi (1,050/km^{2})
- Time zone: UTC−6 (CST)
  - Summer (DST): UTC−5 (CDT)
- ZIP Codes: 66502–66503, 66505–66506
- Area code: 785
- FIPS code: 20-44250
- GNIS ID: 485618
- Website: manhattanks.gov

Manhattan is a city in and the county seat of Riley County, Kansas, United States, although the city extends into Pottawatomie County. It is located in northeastern Kansas at the junction of the Kansas River and Big Blue River. As of the 2020 census, the population of the city was 54,100.

The city was founded by settlers from the New England Emigrant Aid Company as a Free-State town in the 1850s, during the Bleeding Kansas era. Nicknamed "the Little Apple" as a play on New York City's moniker of the "Big Apple", the city is a college town with a significant student population, because it is home to Kansas State University (KSU).

== History ==
=== Indigenous tribes settlement ===
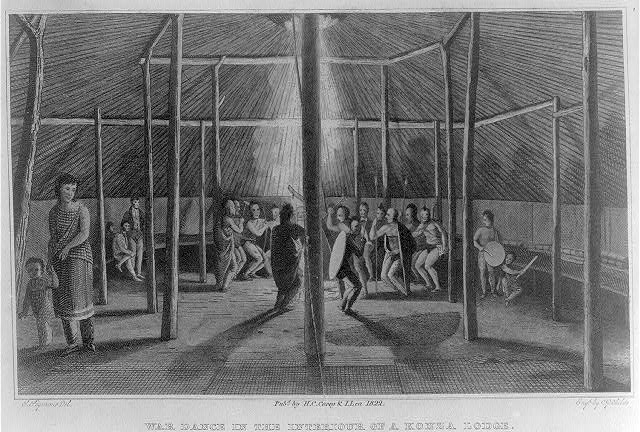
This 1819 illustration of a Kansa lodge at the current location of Manhattan is the oldest drawing known to be made in Kansas.

Before settlement by European-Americans in the 1850s, the land around Manhattan was home to Native tribes. From 1780 to 1830, it was home to the Kaw people, also known as the Kansa. The Kaw settlement was called Blue Earth Village (Manyinkatuhuudje), named after the river which the tribe had named the Great Blue Earth River, today known as the Big Blue River, which intersected with the Kansas River near their village. Blue Earth Village was the site of a large battle between the Kaw and the Pawnee in 1812.

The Kaw tribe ceded ownership of this land in a treaty signed at the Shawnee Methodist Mission on January 14, 1846.

=== 1854: Polistra and Canton ===
The Kansas–Nebraska Act opened the territory to further settlement in 1854. That fall, George S. Park founded the first Euro-American settlement within the borders of the current Manhattan. Park named it Polistra (some histories refer to it as Poliska or Poleska).

Later that year, Samuel D. Houston and three other pioneers founded Canton, a neighboring community near the mouth of the Big Blue River. Neither Canton nor Polistra ever grew beyond their original founders.

=== 1855: Free-Staters ===
In March 1855, a group of New England Free-Staters traveled to Kansas Territory under the auspices of the New England Emigrant Aid Company to found a Free-State town. Led by Isaac Goodnow, the first members of the group (with the help of Samuel C. Pomeroy) selected the location of the Polistra and Canton claims for the Aid Company's new settlement. Soon after the New Englanders arrived at the site, in April 1855, they agreed to join Canton and Polistra to make one settlement named Boston. They were soon joined by dozens more New Englanders, including Goodnow's brother-in-law Joseph Denison.

In June 1855, the paddle steamer Hartford, carrying 75 settlers from Ohio, ran aground in the Kansas River near the settlement. The Ohio settlers, who were members of the Cincinnati-Manhattan Company, had been headed 20 miles (32 km) farther upstream to the headwaters of the Kansas River, the location today of Junction City. After realizing they were stranded, the Hartford passengers accepted an invitation to join the new town, but insisted that it be renamed Manhattan, which was done on June 29, 1855. Manhattan was incorporated on May 30, 1857.

=== Early events ===
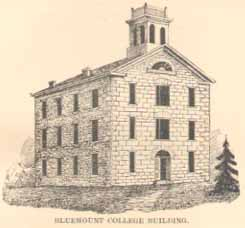
Blue Mont Central College building, built in 1859

Early Manhattan settlers sometimes conflicted with Native tribes, and the town was threatened by pro-enslavement Southerners. Manhattan was staunchly Free-State, and it elected the only two Free-State legislators to the first Territorial Legislature, commonly called the "Bogus Legislature". However, nearby Fort Riley protected the settlement from the major violence visited upon other Free-State towns during the "Bleeding Kansas" era. This allowed the town to develop relatively quickly. On January 30, 1858, Territorial Governor James W. Denver signed an act naming Manhattan as county seat for Riley County. Ten days later, on February 9, 1858, Governor Denver chartered a Methodist college in Manhattan, named Blue Mont Central College.

The young city received another boost when gold was discovered in the Rocky Mountains in 1859 and Fifty-Niners began to stream through Manhattan on their way to prospect in the mountains. Manhattan was one of the last significant settlements on the route west, and the village's merchants did a brisk business selling supplies to miners. Manhattan's first newspaper, The Kansas Express, began publishing on May 21, 1859.

In 1861, when the State of Kansas entered the Union, Isaac Goodnow, who had been a teacher in Rhode Island, began lobbying the legislature to convert Manhattan's Blue Mont Central College into the state university. The culmination of these efforts came on February 16, 1863, when the Kansas legislature established Kansas State Agricultural College (now Kansas State University) in Manhattan. When the college began its first session on September 2, 1863, it was the first public college in Kansas, the nation's first land-grant institution created under the Morrill Act, and only the second public institution of higher learning to admit women and men equally in the United States.

By the time the Kansas Pacific Railroad laid its tracks west through Manhattan in 1866, the 11-year-old settlement was permanently ensconced in the tallgrass prairie. Manhattan's population has grown every decade since its founding.

=== 20th century ===
The town received the All-America City Award in 1952, the first in Kansas.

== Geography ==
Manhattan is located at coordinates 39.1836082, -96.5716694 in the scenic Flint Hills and Great Plains of the state of Kansas, or about 50 miles (80 km) west of Topeka on the Kansas River.

According to the United States Census Bureau, the city has an area of 18.79 square miles (48.67 km^{2}), of which 18.76 square miles (48.59 km^{2}) is land and 0.03 square miles (0.08 km^{2}) is water.

=== Geographic features ===
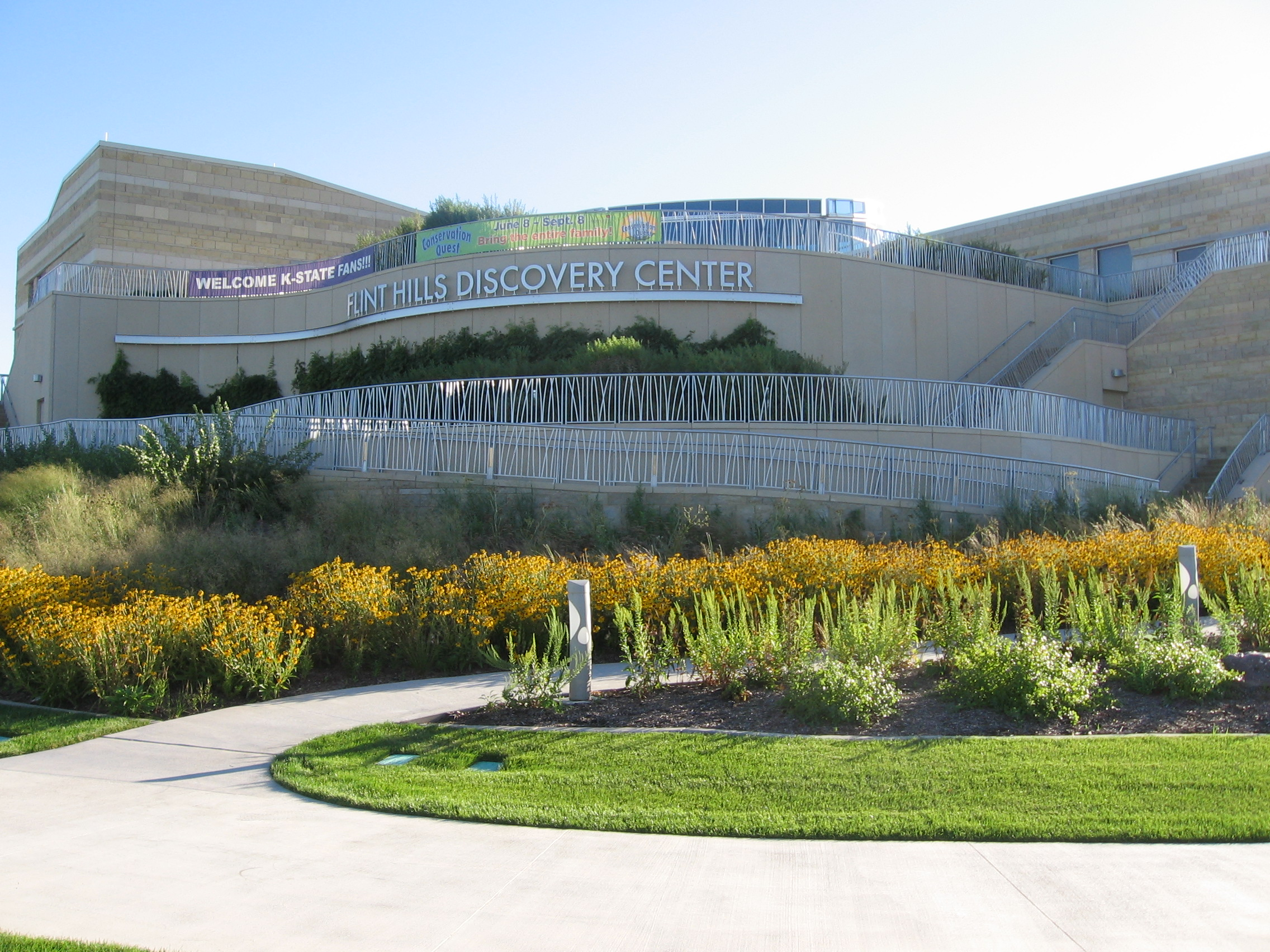
Flint Hills Discovery Center

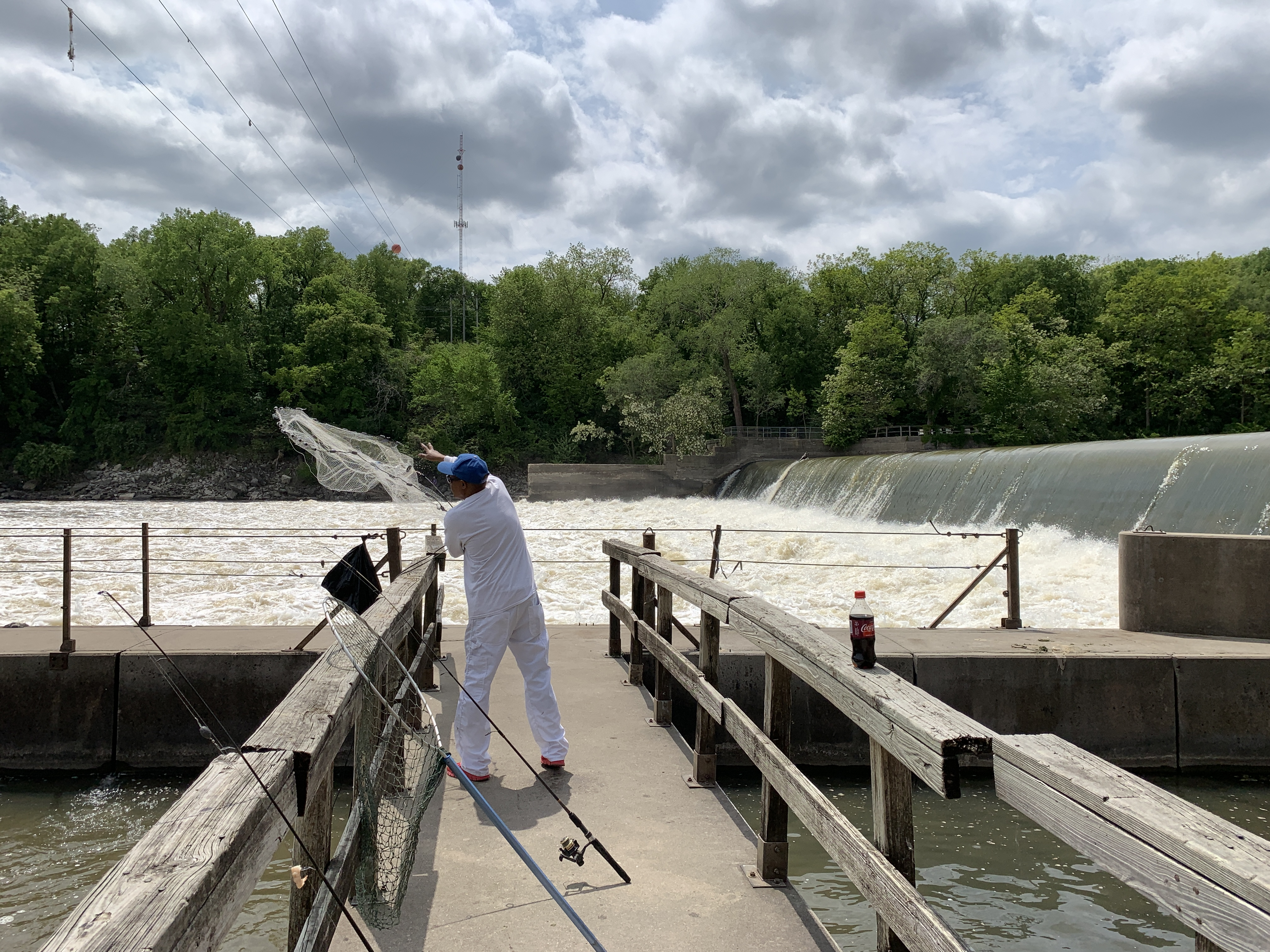
Rocky Ford spillway fishing area on the Big Blue River (2021)

Manhattan is in the Flint Hills region of Kansas, which consists of continuous rolling hills covered in tall grasses. However, the downtown area – Manhattan's original site – was built on a broad, flat floodplain at the junction of the Kansas and Big Blue rivers. Manhattan is the largest town in the Flint Hills, and is home to the Flint Hills Discovery Center.

Tuttle Creek Reservoir is 5 miles (8 km) north of Manhattan. The lake was formed when the Big Blue River was dammed for flood control in the 1960s, and it is now a state park that offers many recreational opportunities. South of the city is the Konza Prairie, a tallgrass prairie preserve owned by The Nature Conservancy and Kansas State University.

==== Earthquakes ====
Kansas is not known for earthquake activity, but Manhattan is near the Nemaha Ridge, a long structure bounded by several faults, and which is still active. In particular, the Humboldt Fault Zone lies just 12 miles (19 km) eastward of Tuttle Creek Reservoir.

On April 24, 1867, the 1867 Manhattan earthquake struck Riley County. Measuring 5.1 on the Richter magnitude scale, the earthquake's epicenter was by Manhattan. It remains the strongest earthquake to originate in Kansas, at an intensity of VII (Very strong) on the Mercalli intensity scale, and felt across roughly 193,051 square miles (500,000 km^{2}). It caused largely minor damage, reports of which were confined to Kansas, Iowa, and Missouri, according to the United States Geological Survey.

Although Kansas is not seismically active, a strong earthquake could pose significant threats to the state. If an earthquake had occurred along the Nemaha Ridge prior to 2010, it could have destroyed the dam on Tuttle Creek Reservoir, releasing 300,000 feet (91,440 m) of water per second and flooding the nearby area, threatening roughly 13,000 people and 5,900 homes. A study in the 1980s found a moderate earthquake "between 5.7 to 6.6 would cause sand underneath the dam to liquefy into quicksand, causing the dam to spread out and the top to drop up to three feet." To address this threat, the Army Corps of Engineers completed a project in July 2010 that replaced the sand with more than 350 concrete walls and equipped the dam with sensors. Alarms are connected to these sensors, which would alert nearby citizens to the earthquake.

=== Climate ===
Manhattan has a humid continental climate (Köppen Dfa), typically experiencing hot, humid summers and cold, dry winters. The monthly daily average temperature ranges from 29.1 °F (−1.6 °C) in January to 80.0 °F (26.7 °C) in July. The high temperature reaches or exceeds 90 °F (32 °C) an average of 58.9 days a year and 100 °F (38 °C) an average of 9.6 days. The minimum temperature falls to or below 0 °F (−18 °C) on an average 4.1 days a year. Extreme temperatures range from 116 °F (47 °C) on August 13, 1936, down to −35 °F (−37 °C) on February 12, 1899.

On average, Manhattan receives 35.77 inches (908.6 mm) of precipitation annually, a majority of which occurs from May to August, and records 102 days of measurable precipitation. Measurable snowfall occurs an average of 8.8 days per year with 5.6 days receiving at least one inch (2.5 cm). Snow depth of at least one inch occurs an average of 20.3 days a year. Typically, the average window for freezing temperatures is October 16 through April 20.

Climate data for Manhattan, Kansas, 1991–2020 normals, extremes 1893–present
Month	Jan	Feb	Mar	Apr	May	Jun	Jul	Aug	Sep	Oct	Nov	Dec	Year
Record high °F (°C)	75 (24)	84 (29)	95 (35)	99 (37)	103 (39)	112 (44)	115 (46)	116 (47)	112 (44)	98 (37)	90 (32)	77 (25)	116 (47)
Mean maximum °F (°C)	63.9 (17.7)	70.8 (21.6)	80.8 (27.1)	87.8 (31.0)	92.8 (33.8)	97.6 (36.4)	102.9 (39.4)	101.6 (38.7)	96.6 (35.9)	89.6 (32.0)	75.1 (23.9)	65.2 (18.4)	104.4 (40.2)
Mean daily maximum °F (°C)	39.6 (4.2)	45.1 (7.3)	56.3 (13.5)	66.4 (19.1)	75.9 (24.4)	85.8 (29.9)	90.8 (32.7)	89.0 (31.7)	81.3 (27.4)	69.1 (20.6)	54.6 (12.6)	43.0 (6.1)	66.4 (19.1)
Daily mean °F (°C)	29.1 (−1.6)	33.6 (0.9)	43.9 (6.6)	54.3 (12.4)	65.0 (18.3)	75.1 (23.9)	80.0 (26.7)	77.7 (25.4)	69.2 (20.7)	56.6 (13.7)	43.2 (6.2)	32.7 (0.4)	55.0 (12.8)
Mean daily minimum °F (°C)	18.7 (−7.4)	22.1 (−5.5)	31.5 (−0.3)	42.2 (5.7)	54.1 (12.3)	64.3 (17.9)	69.3 (20.7)	66.4 (19.1)	57.1 (13.9)	44.1 (6.7)	31.8 (−0.1)	22.5 (−5.3)	43.7 (6.5)
Mean minimum °F (°C)	−1.4 (−18.6)	3.4 (−15.9)	12.6 (−10.8)	25.9 (−3.4)	37.1 (2.8)	49.8 (9.9)	56.8 (13.8)	54.2 (12.3)	39.9 (4.4)	25.9 (−3.4)	14.8 (−9.6)	3.9 (−15.6)	−4.7 (−20.4)
Record low °F (°C)	−31 (−35)	−35 (−37)	−12 (−24)	5 (−15)	23 (−5)	39 (4)	45 (7)	40 (4)	26 (−3)	13 (−11)	−9 (−23)	−22 (−30)	−35 (−37)
Average precipitation inches (mm)	0.64 (16)	1.14 (29)	2.17 (55)	3.38 (86)	5.23 (133)	5.47 (139)	4.62 (117)	4.40 (112)	3.41 (87)	2.50 (64)	1.62 (41)	1.19 (30)	35.77 (909)
Average snowfall inches (cm)	4.8 (12)	5.0 (13)	1.8 (4.6)	0.1 (0.25)	0.0 (0.0)	0.0 (0.0)	0.0 (0.0)	0.0 (0.0)	0.0 (0.0)	0.0 (0.0)	1.1 (2.8)	4.8 (12)	17.6 (44.65)
Average precipitation days (≥ 0.01 in)	5.2	5.6	8.2	10.4	12.9	10.8	9.9	10.7	8.4	8.1	6.4	5.4	102.0
Average snowy days (≥ 0.1 in)	2.5	2.3	1.0	0.1	0.0	0.0	0.0	0.0	0.0	0.1	0.6	2.2	8.8
Source 1: NOAA
Source 2: National Weather Service

==== Tornadoes ====
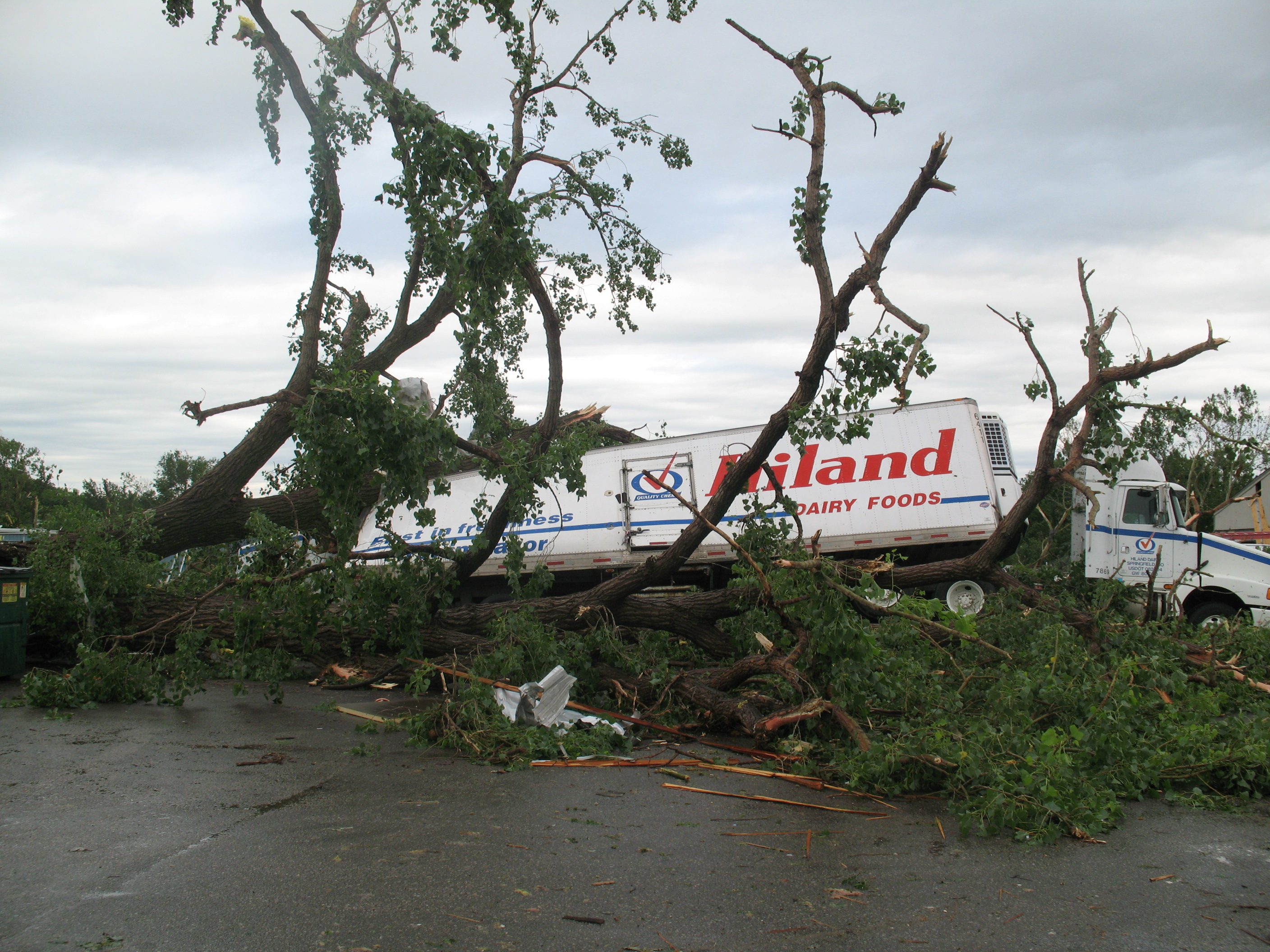
The 2008 tornado damaged an industrial area on the west side of Manhattan before hitting the KSU campus.

The state of Kansas falls within an area sometimes called Tornado Alley. The most destructive tornado in Manhattan touched down at approximately 10:30 pm on June 11, 2008. Thirty-one homes and several businesses were destroyed by the EF4 tornado. Kansas State University's campus incurred about $20 million in damage – a number of university buildings sustained significant damage and the tornado's winds destroyed the Wind Erosion Laboratory's garage. No one was killed.

Previously, the most destructive tornado to hit Manhattan was on June 8, 1966. The 1966 tornado caused $5 million ($49.6 million in 2025) in damage and injured at least 65 people in Manhattan.

==== Flooding ====
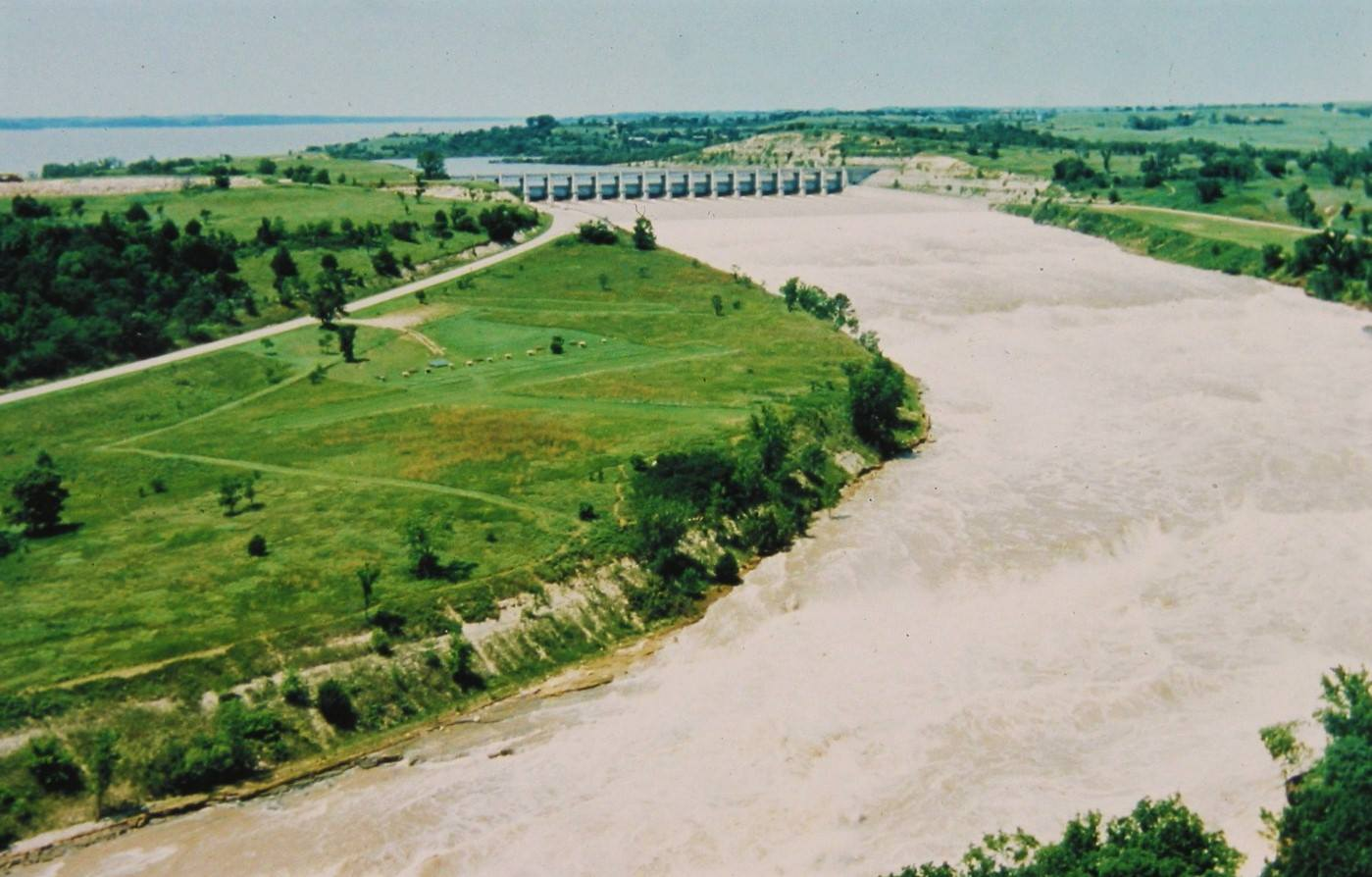
The Tuttle Creek Spillway Downstream Flooding after the emergency gates were opened in July 1993

Manhattan was built on a floodplain at the junction of the Kansas and Big Blue rivers, and it has faced recurring problems with flooding from heavy precipitation. The worst floods were the 1903 and 1908 floods, the Great Flood of 1951, and the Great Flood of 1993. In 2019, record amounts of rainfall in Kansas brought water levels up massive amounts and flood records were broken that had not been seen since 1993. Tuttle Creek Reservoir recorded its second highest flood level ever on May 31 at 1,135.8 feet (346.2 m) above sea level. The only level higher came from The Great Flood of 1993, which recorded an astounding 1,138 feet above sea-level on July 23. The top of the emergency Spillway gates measures at 1,136 feet (346 m), only 0.2 feet (6.1 cm) above the 2019 record lake level. The only time that the emergency Spillway gates have ever been opened was on July 19, 1993, at 3:15 PM. The gates were opened 0.8 feet (24 cm) which allowed 10,000 cubic feet (280 m^{3}) per second of water to move through the downstream channel. The gates were slowly opened more each day until July 23 at a peak 60,000 cubic feet (1,700 m^{3}) per second (450,000 US gallons [1,700,000 L; 370,000 imp gal] per second). The gates remained open until August 9, 1993. The normal level for Tuttle Creek Reservoir averages 1,075 feet (328 m).

== Demographics ==
Historical population
Census	Pop.	Note	%±
1870	1,173		—
1880	2,105		79.5%
1890	3,004		42.7%
1900	3,438		14.4%
1910	5,722		66.4%
1920	7,989		39.6%
1930	10,136		26.9%
1940	11,659		15.0%
1950	19,056		63.4%
1960	22,993		20.7%
1970	27,575		19.9%
1980	32,644		18.4%
1990	37,712		15.5%
2000	44,831		18.9%
2010	52,281		16.6%
2020	54,100		3.5%
2024 (est.)	54,700		1.1%
U.S. Decennial Census; 2010-2020

Manhattan is the principal city of the Manhattan metropolitan area which, as of 2014, had an estimated population of 98,091. It is also the principal city of the Manhattan-Junction City, Kansas Combined Statistical Area which, as of 2014, had an estimated population of 134,804, making it the fourth largest urban area in Kansas.

=== 2020 census ===
As of the 2020 census, Manhattan had a population of 54,100 and 21,414 households, including 9,995 families. The population density was 2,715.6 per square mile (1,048.5/km^{2}). There were 24,342 housing units at an average density of 1,221.9 per square mile (471.8/km^{2}).

Of the 21,414 households, 21.9% had children under the age of 18 living in them. Of all households, 34.9% were married-couple households, 28.4% were households with a male householder and no spouse or partner present, and 29.9% were households with a female householder and no spouse or partner present. About 35.5% of all households were made up of individuals and 7.4% had someone living alone who was 65 years of age or older.

The population was 16.5% under the age of 18, 32.6% from 18 to 24, 27.3% from 25 to 44, 13.5% from 45 to 64, and 10.3% who were 65 years of age or older. The median age was 25.4 years. For every 100 females there were 103.1 males, and for every 100 females age 18 and over there were 101.7 males. 99.8% of residents lived in urban areas, while 0.2% lived in rural areas.

Racial composition as of the 2020 census
Race	Number	Percent
White	41,142	76.0%
Black or African American	3,199	5.9%
American Indian and Alaska Native	283	0.5%
Asian	2,878	5.3%
Native Hawaiian and Other Pacific Islander	151	0.3%
Some other race	1,908	3.5%
Two or more races	4,539	8.4%
Hispanic or Latino (of any race)	4,980	9.2%

2016–2020 American Community Survey

The 2016–2020 5-year American Community Survey estimates show that the average household size was 2.4 and the average family size was 2.9. The percent of those with a bachelor's degree or higher was estimated to be 30.7% of the population.

The 2016–2020 5-year American Community Survey estimates show that the median household income was $50,957 (with a margin of error of +/- $2,480) and the median family income was $79,601 (+/- $9,139). Males had a median income of $21,285 (+/- $2,275) versus $14,590 (+/- $1,280) for females. The median income for those above 16 years old was $17,843 (+/- $1,668). Approximately, 11.2% of families and 26.9% of the population were below the poverty line, including 21.0% of those under the age of 18 and 2.4% of those ages 65 or over.

=== 2010 census ===
As of the census of 2010, there were 52,281 people, 20,008 households, and 9,466 families residing in the city. The population density was 2,786.8 inhabitants per square mile (1,076.0/km^{2}). There were 21,619 housing units at an average density of 1,152.4 per square mile (444.9/km^{2}). The racial makeup was 83.5% Caucasian, 5.5% African American, 0.5% Native American, 5.1% Asian, 0.2% Pacific Islander, 1.7% from other races, and 3.5% from two or more races. Hispanic or Latino of any race were 5.8% of the population.

There were 20,008 households, of which 22.3% had children under the age of 18 living with them, 36.0% were married couples living together, 8.2% had a female householder with no husband present, 3.1% had a male householder with no wife present, and 52.7% were non-families. 30.3% of all households were made up of individuals, and 5.9% had someone living alone who was 65 years of age or older. The average household size was 2.30 and the average family size was 2.82.

The population was spread out, with 15.3% of residents under the age of 18; 39.1% between the ages of 18 and 24; 24% from 25 to 44; 14.2% from 45 to 64; and 7.5% who were 65 years of age or older. The median age was 23.8 years. The gender makeup of the city was 50.9% male and 49.1% female.

== Economy ==
Manhattan's economy is heavily based on the public sector. Kansas State University is the largest employer in town, and its approximately 24,000 students help support the retail and entertainment venues in the city. The second-largest employer in Manhattan is the city school district. Additionally, many civilians and military personnel employed at nearby Fort Riley also live in Manhattan and support its economy, including more than 3,500 civilian Fort Riley employees. Finally, most of the 150 employees in the Kansas Department of Agriculture work in a new office building in Manhattan, next to the National Bio and Agro-Defense Facility (NBAF).

Large private sector employers in Manhattan include the Ascension Via Christi Hospitals, CivicPlus, and Farm Bureau. Manhattan also features a small industrial base. Manufacturing and commercial businesses include: GTM Sportswear, Florence Corporation, Manko Windows, Parker Hannifin, the McCall Pattern Company, Ultra Electronics-ICE, and Farrar Corporation.

The Steel & Pipe Supply Co. began in Manhattan in 1933, with corporate headquarters in the city although it has moved its fabrication and distribution to other locations.

=== Historic businesses ===
Manhattan's Tallgrass Brewing Company was the largest brewery in Kansas until it ceased operations in 2018. The former Dickinson Theatres chain began in Manhattan in 1920, and grew to operate in seven states before it was purchased in 2014.

== Government ==
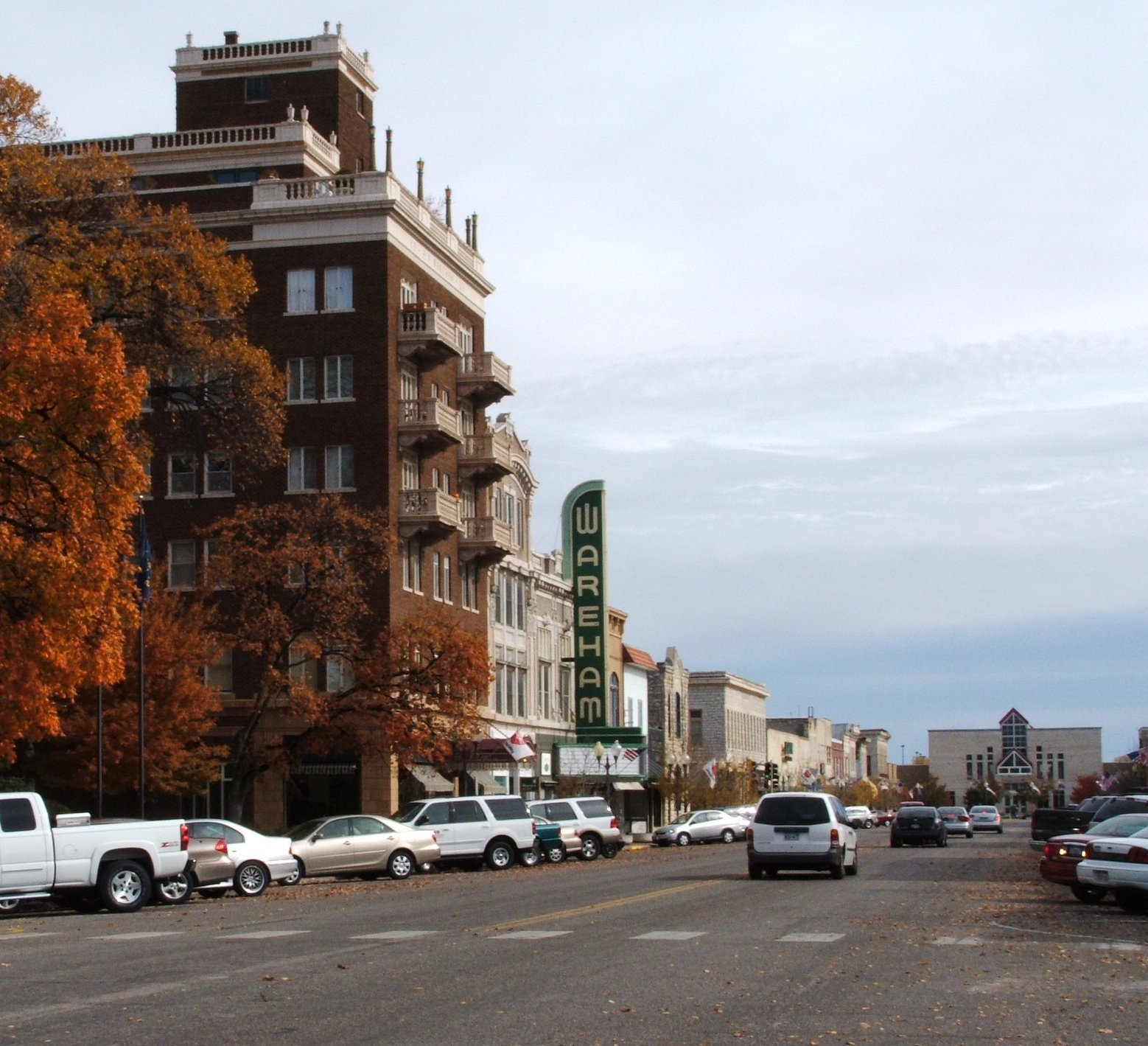
Downtown Manhattan (2005)

=== Local ===
Manhattan is governed under a council-manager system, with a five-member City Commission. Elections are nonpartisan and are held every other year, in odd-numbered years. Three City Commission positions are chosen in each election. The two highest vote recipients receive four-year terms, while the third highest vote recipient receives a two-year term. The highest vote winner in a general election is established to serve as mayor on the third year of a four-year term. The Mayor presides over Commission meetings, but has the same voting rights as other Commissioners and no veto power. As of 2025, Susan Adamchak serves as the city's mayor.

=== State ===
Manhattan is located inside several state district boundaries. Most of Manhattan falls within two districts for the Kansas House of Representatives. Representative Mike Dodson (R) serves in District 67, which includes portions of south, west, and northern Riley County. Representative Sydney Carlin (D) represents District 66, which includes most of downtown Manhattan, and the northeastern portions of the city. Small portions of Manhattan extend into other districts to the south and north.

Manhattan is the Kansas Senate District 22, and the state senator is Republican Brad Starnes.

=== Federal ===
Manhattan is located in Kansas's 1st congressional district, which is represented by Republican Tracey Mann. Manhattan was moved from the 2nd District to the 1st District during redistricting in 2012. Manhattan had been placed originally in the 1st District when the state was subdivided in 1874. John Alexander Anderson of Manhattan served as the district's second Congressional representative, from 1879 to 1885.

No Democratic candidate for president had ever received majority support among Riley County voters, until Joe Biden won the county in the 2020 election. Republicans have carried Riley County in every previous presidential election, except for 1912, when a majority of the county's voters supported the Progressive candidate Theodore Roosevelt.

Presidential elections results for the city of Manhattan, Kansas
Year	Republican	Democratic	Third Parties
2020	41.2% 8,221	55.4% 11,060	3.4% 670
2016	42.1% 7,103	47.8% 8,068	10.1% 1,716
2012	50.9% 8,292	46.1% 7,511	3.0% 499

== Education ==
=== Colleges and universities ===
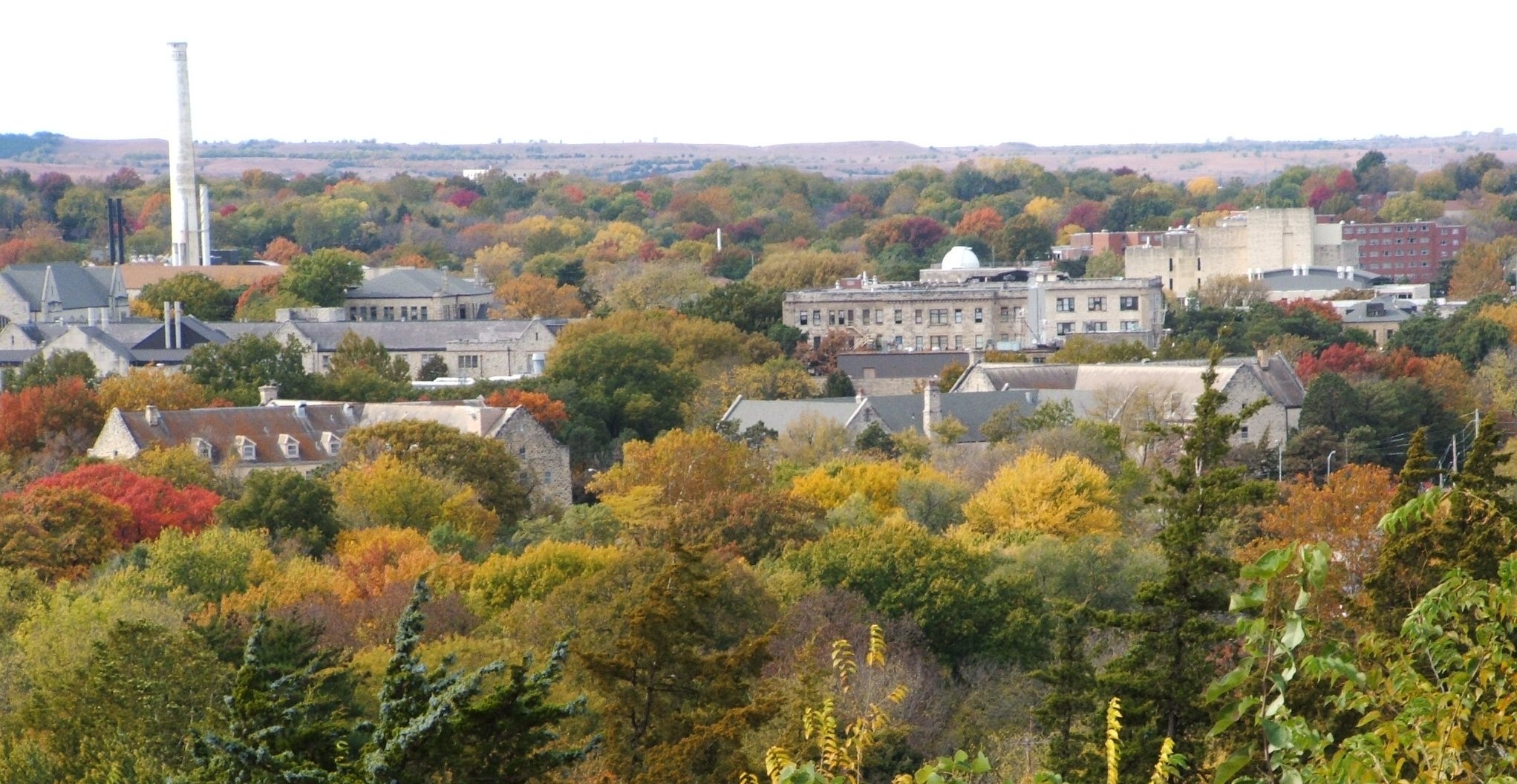
Northern KSU campus in fall (2005)

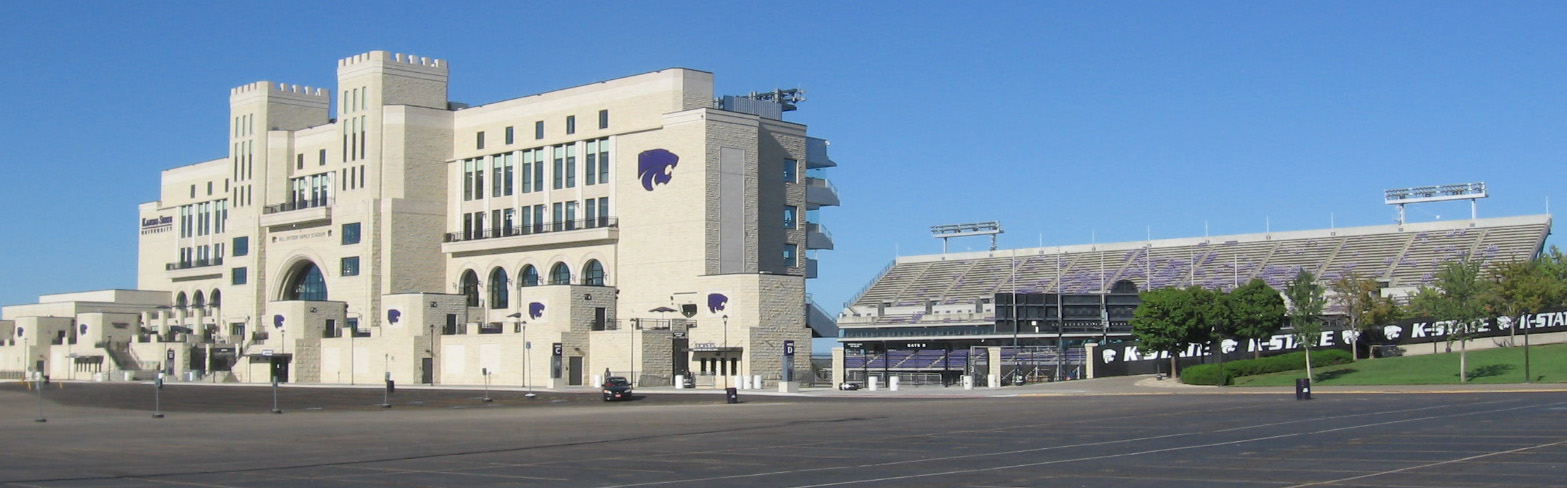
Bill Snyder Family Football Stadium seats 50,000 spectators.

Kansas State University is the largest employer and educational institution in the city of Manhattan with nearly 24,000 students. KSU is home to Wildcat sports and to nationally recognized academics. It has ranked first nationally among state universities in its total of Rhodes, Marshall, Truman, Goldwater, and Udall scholars since 1986.

Manhattan is home to Manhattan Christian College, Manhattan Area Technical College, the American Institute of Baking, The Flint Hills Job Corps Training Center, and the Kansas Building Science Institute.

=== Primary and secondary education ===
The majority of Manhattan is within the Manhattan-Ogden USD 383 public school district. This district has one public high school (Manhattan High School), two middle schools (Susan B. Anthony and Dwight D. Eisenhower), and ten elementary schools (Amanda Arnold, Frank V. Bergman, Bluemont, Lee, Marlatt, Northview, Oliver Brown, Theodore Roosevelt and Woodrow Wilson). The city also has two private school systems: Flint Hills Christian School (Preschool – 12th grade) and the Manhattan Catholic Schools. Manhattan Catholic School contains two buildings, the grade school building (K-5)and the Luckey Jr. High building (6–8), formerly called the Luckey high building dedicated to Monsignor Luckey. The school's mascot is "Luckey the Cardinal".

A portion of Manhattan is in the Riley County USD 378.

== Sites of interest ==
The Marianna Kistler Beach Museum of Art and the Kansas State University Gardens are on the campus of Kansas State University. Next to the campus is Aggieville with shopping and bars.

Manhattan's Sunset Zoo is accredited by the Association of Zoos and Aquariums (AZA). Colbert Hills Golf Course, which is annually ranked by Golf Digest among the best in the state, is home to the Earl Woods National Youth Golf Academy and a host site for The First Tee program. Manhattan is the birthplace of Damon Runyon, the "Inventor of Broadway", and his Manhattan house is listed on the National Register of Historic Places.

The buildings for The Flint Hills Job Corps Training Center west of the city were once used as a nursing home and orphanage operated by the Fraternal Order of Odd Fellows.

The first capitol of the Kansas Territory is preserved nearby, on Fort Riley grounds. The Fort Riley military base covers 100,656 acres (407.34 km^{2}) between Manhattan and Junction City, KS. Since 2006 it has, once again, become home to the Big Red One, the 1st Infantry Division of the United States.

As the largest municipality in the Flint Hills region, Manhattan is host to the Flint Hills Discovery Center, a heritage and science center dedicated to the education and preservation of the Flint Hills and the remaining tall grass prairie.

The city's Yuma Street Historic District is listed in the National Register of Historic Places.

== Culture ==
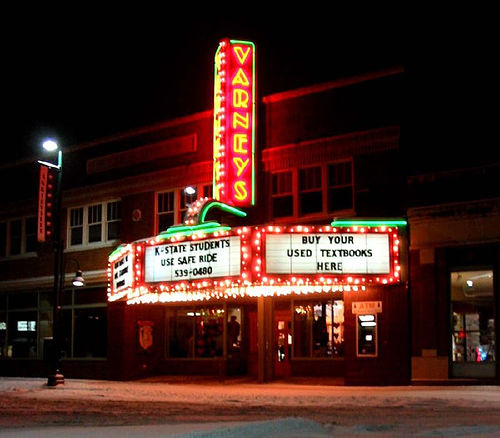
Aggieville (2004)

Aggieville is a center of shopping and nightlife with many stores, bars, and live bands. Downtown Manhattan, and the Manhattan Town Center Mall, are an anchor for shopping, art, fine dining, and entertainment in eastern Manhattan.

Kansas State University's school sessions greatly impact Manhattan culture. Bill Snyder Family Football Stadium, Bramlage Coliseum, and McCain Auditorium host national events, including lectures and concerts. Marianna Kistler Beach Museum of Art hosts the university's permanent art collection and traveling art exhibits.

== Transportation ==
In 2009, the Manhattan, Kansas, metropolitan statistical area (MSA) ranked as the fifth highest in the United States for percentage of commuters who walked to work (8.5 percent).

=== Airports ===
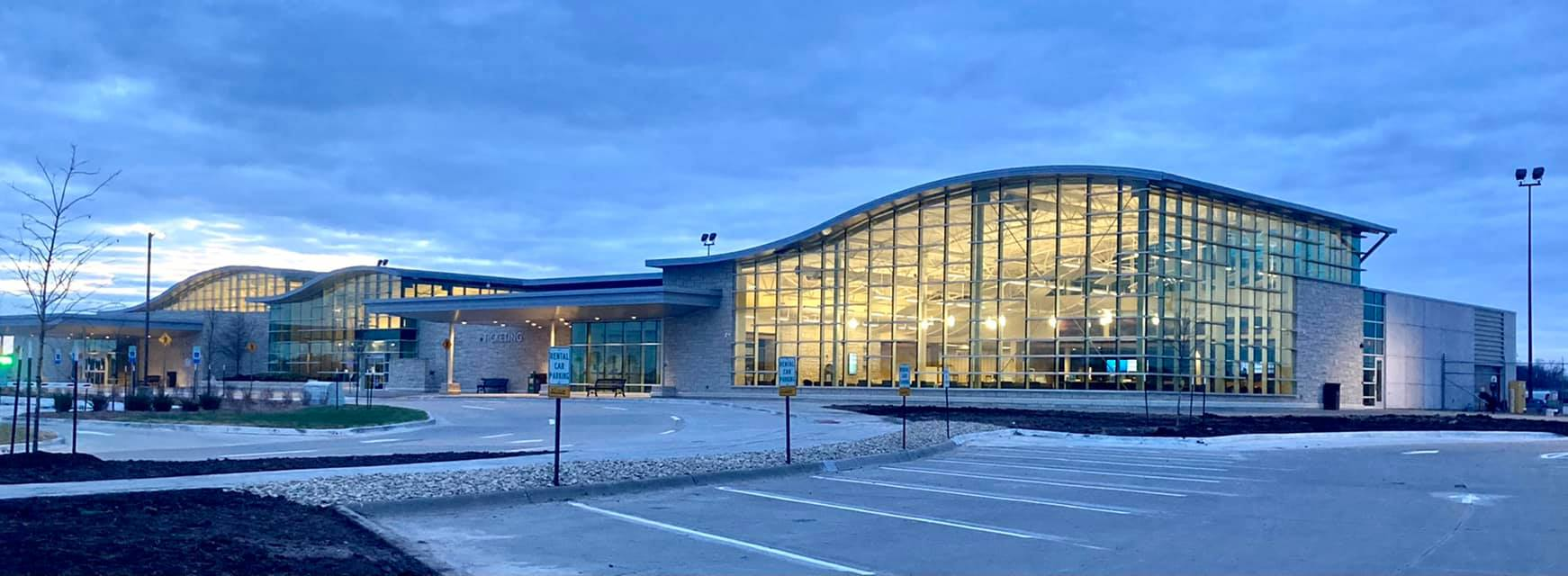
Manhattan Regional Airport New Terminal (2021)

Manhattan Regional Airport (MHK) is located 2 miles (3 km) west of Manhattan on K-18, and is the second busiest commercial airport in Kansas. The airport is served by American Airlines subsidiary American Eagle, which offers multiple flights daily to Chicago's O'Hare International Airport and the Dallas/Fort Worth International Airport, as well as handling general aviation and charter flights. The nearest larger commercial airports are in Kansas City (MCI) and Wichita, Kansas (ICT).

=== Rail ===
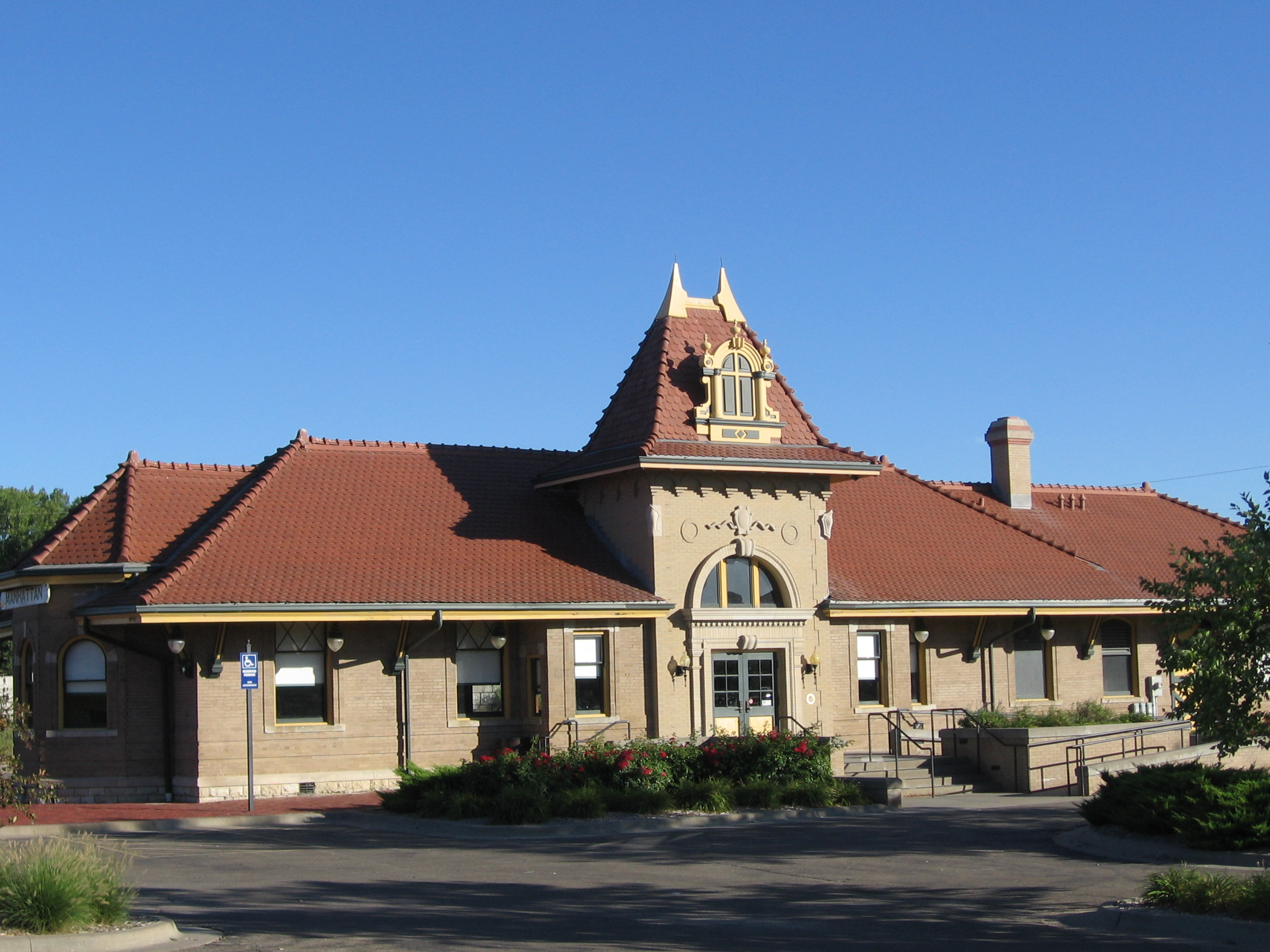
The former Union Pacific passenger depot has been repurposed as an event space.

Domestic passenger rail service to Manhattan began on August 20, 1866, on the Kansas Pacific Railroad line. A mainline of the Union Pacific Railroad still passes through the city, but all passenger service to Manhattan was discontinued after the Amtrak takeover of passenger rail in 1971. The nearest Amtrak stop is the Topeka station serving the Southwest Chief.

The Rock Island Railroad also formerly served Manhattan as a stop on Rock Island's Kansas City–Colorado Springs Rocky Mountain Rocket service. The Rock Island depot was located between Fifth and Sixth streets, along former El Paso Street (now Fort Riley Boulevard). The former railroad right-of-way was converted to Manhattan's main southern east–west arterial road, Fort Riley Boulevard, as well as a rail-trail, linear park up the Wildcat Creek valley through Manhattan's west side.

=== Intercity bus service ===
Intercity bus service is available via Greyhound Lines. Arrow Stage Line operates a charter service out of local facilities on McCall Road.

=== Public transportation ===
Within the City of Manhattan, general public transportation is provided by Riley County's ATA Bus service. ATA Bus started its first fixed-route bus route in Manhattan in 2011.

Historically, the city operated a streetcar system from 1909 to 1928. The trolley tracks were torn up and replaced by bus service in 1928, which was later also discontinued.

=== Highways ===
Manhattan is served by several highways:

- I-70 / US-40 runs about 9 miles (14 km) south of Manhattan. Three exits have a direct connection to Manhattan.
  - Exit 313 – K-177
  - Exit 307 – McDowell Creek Road
  - Exit 303 – K-18
- US-24 runs through Manhattan. East on 24 is Wamego, west is Clay Center. US-24 comes in from Clay Center, runs north of the city, turns into a four-lane highway near Tuttle Creek State Park and travels south into the city as Tuttle Creek Boulevard until an intersection with East Poyntz Avenue, and then turns northeast towards Wamego.
- K-177 runs north from I-70 as Bill Snyder Highway until the Kansas River viaduct. A half-leaf interchange with K-18 (Tuttle Creek Blvd. and Ft. Riley Blvd.) and officially ends at the intersection with U.S. Route 24 in Manhattan.
- K-18 is a major connector in Manhattan. It begins about 18 miles (29 km) east of Manhattan, at K-99. It runs through Wabaunsee and Zeandale to K-177, crosses to Kansas River, and runs west toward the Manhattan Regional Airport and Ogden. It then travels south to I-70 as a major gateway to Manhattan.
- K-113 (Seth Child Road) runs from K-18 in southern Manhattan to US-24, passing through the western areas of the city.

Historically, Manhattan was located on the national Victory Highway, one of the original 1920s auto trails. With the creation of the numbered federal highway system in 1926, the highway became U.S. Route 40. From 1926 to 1935, Route 40 diverged west out of Manhattan into "40N" and "40S" routes; the two routes met again in Limon, Colorado.

In the 1950s, Route 40 was rerouted nine miles south of Manhattan, due to security concerns that originally arose during World War II about the highway passing through neighboring Fort Riley. The new route followed a more direct line between Topeka and Junction City, and in 1956 it was designated as Interstate 70.

== Media ==
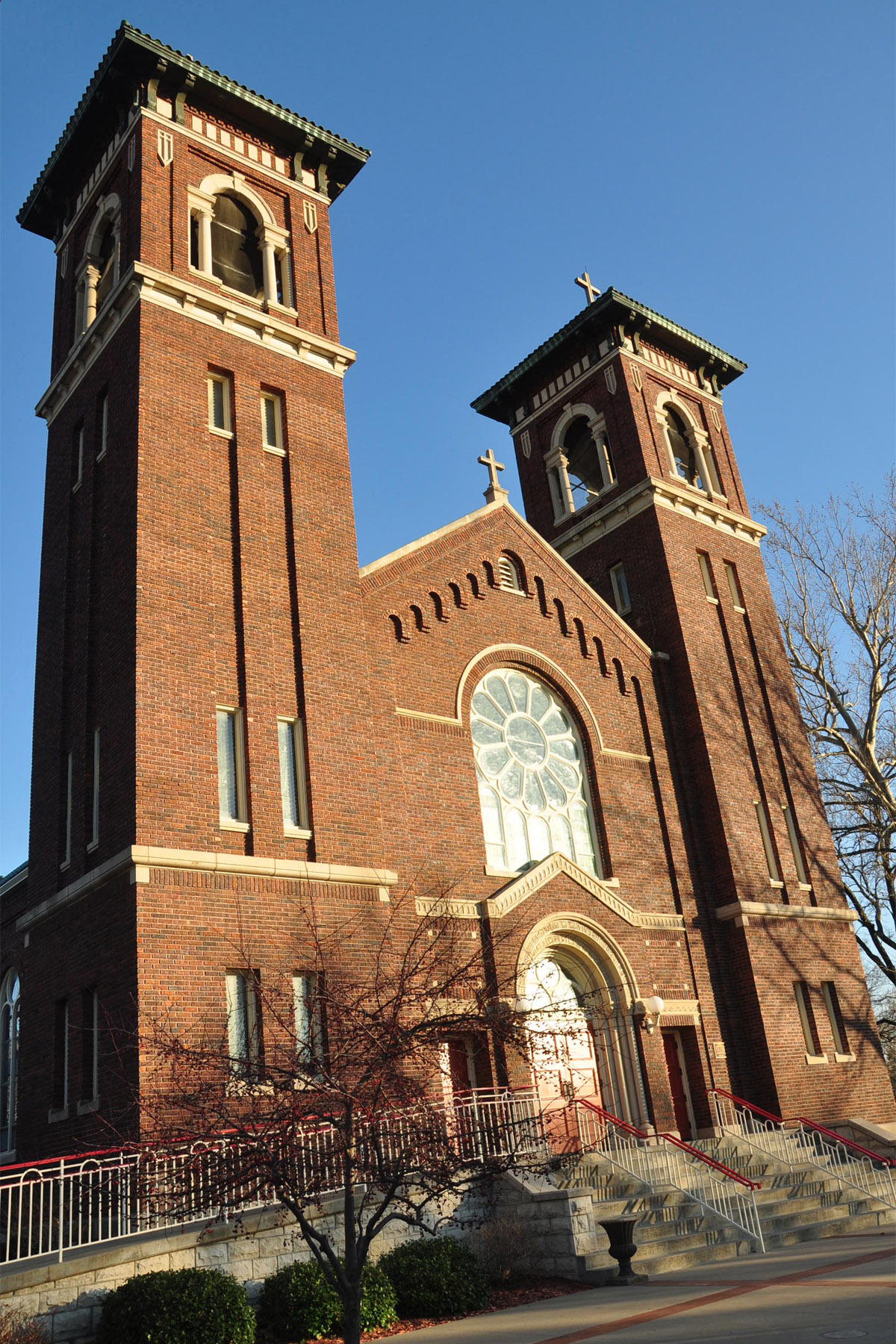
Seven Dolors Catholic Church, added to the U.S. Register of Historic Places in 1995

The Manhattan Mercury is the city's main newspaper, published six days a week. Other newspapers published in the city include: the alternative weekly The Hype Weekly which focuses on events, arts, and culture in the area; the weekly Manhattan Free Press; the agriculture-oriented Grass & Grain; and the K-State university newspaper, the Kansas State Collegian. Manhattan has had at least one newspaper published for the town continuously since The Kansas Express published its first edition on May 21, 1859.

Manhattan is a center of broadcast media for the surrounding area. One AM and ten FM radio stations are licensed to and/or broadcast from the city. Manhattan lies within the Topeka, Kansas, television market, and six stations are licensed to and/or broadcast from the city including: a translator of KTWU, the PBS member station in Topeka; K-State's station KKSU-LD; two GCN translators; and two independent stations.

The first television station in Kansas was W9XAK in Manhattan, licensed to broadcast by the Federal Radio Commission on March 9, 1932.

== Twin and sister cities ==
Manhattan, Kansas is twinned with:

- Dobřichovice, Czech Republic (2006)

== See also ==
- Johnny Kaw – fictional character styled after Paul Bunyan
- Freedom's Frontier National Heritage Area
- June 1966 tornado outbreak sequence
- Great Flood of 1951
