= ATA Bus =

Bus system in Riley County, Kansas

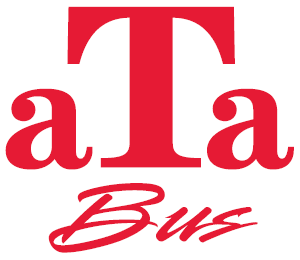
- Founded: 1976
- Locale: Manhattan, Kansas
- Service area: Riley County, Kansas
- Service type: Paratransit Fixed-Route
- Fleet: 28
- Website: ATA Bus

ATA Bus is a private, not-for-profit bus system in Riley County, Kansas, United States that provides fixed-route, paratransit, and safe ride services. It is funded by county, state, and federal tax dollars. ATA Bus began fixed-route bus service in April 2012 for the rapidly expanding Manhattan, KS urban area. ATA originally stood for Aging Transportation Agency but now stands for Area Transportation Agency.

== Fares ==
Fixed route service fare is $1.00 for Adults, $0.50 for Youths (6 to 18), Children (under 6) are free but must be accompanied. There is a free-fare zone for Kansas State University staff/faculty/students with ID between the stops at the University (Beach Museum, Edwards Hall, Student Union and Foundation building). Seniors and Disabled can apply for half-fare cards, and personal care attendants can ride free. Transfers can take place at the Student Union stop. A $30 monthly pass is available.

Demand response fares are $2.00 one way inside Manhattan, Junction City, and Fort Riley city limits. Fares are $4.00 for locations more than three miles beyond city limits but still within the service area.

Eligible residents may qualify for complimentary paratransit service.

Safe Ride is free for individuals with a Kansas State University ID. One ID will cover up to four individuals. Fares are $2.00 otherwise.

== Services ==
ATA's service area is the Manhattan-Riley County area, western Pottawatomie County including the Green Valley area and the St George Area, Fort Riley, and the Junction City-Geary County area including the towns of Grandview Plaza and Milford.

The Manhattan fixed route service operates Monday through Saturday. Buses run from 7 a.m. to 6 p.m. on Monday through Friday, and 8 a.m. to 7 p.m. on Saturday. The Junction City fixed route service operates Monday through Friday, 7 a.m. to 7 p.m.

The demand response service operates Monday through Friday. The hours are from 7 a.m. to 5 p.m. with the last pick ups of the day made at 5:00 p.m. Rides must be scheduled the day before. Also you can schedule multiple rides at one time .

ATA provides a zone-based pickup schedule for most of rural Riley County. On Mondays and Tuesdays the service makes pick-ups between 7:30 a.m. and 9:00 a.m. in northern Riley County. They usually make their return trips between 1:00 p.m. and 1:30 p.m.

Service to and from Ogden, Kansas is available Monday through Friday. Riders wishing to ride the bus need to call in to the Dispatcher and schedule a ride as usual. The service has a fixed schedule and stops at designated places in Ogden three times a day. Door to door demand responsive service in Ogden is available for persons with mobility impairments.

SafeRide operates on Thursday, Friday, and Saturday nights when Kansas State University is in session. ATA Bus also partners with Kansas State University to provide shuttle service on the Manhattan campus.

== Fleet ==
ATA Bus operates 28 vehicles. All buses are equipped with ramps and lifts to accommodate the needs of riders with disabilities. Some buses are equipped with racks to carry bikes.

A 2009 federal grant of $500,000 authorized ATA Bus to purchase five new twenty-passenger buses to implement fixed-route service.
