= Aggieville =

Business community in Manhattan, Kansas

Coordinates: 39°11′09″N 96°34′32″W

Aggieville is a community of six square blocks in Manhattan, Kansas, consisting of bars, restaurants, and shops oriented around university culture. Its nightlife scene peaks surrounding Kansas State games.

== History ==
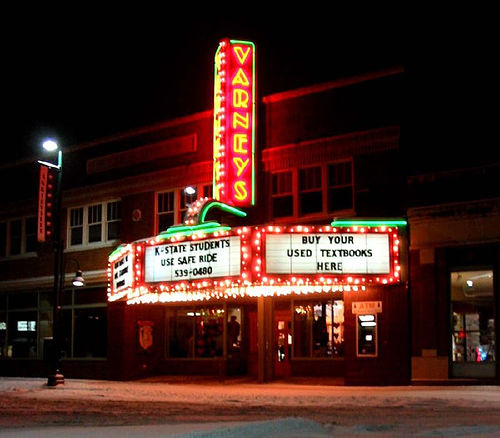
Varneys was an iconic store located at the west end of Aggieville.

Before 1898, students at the Kansas State Agricultural College (now Kansas State University) had to purchase their textbooks downtown, which, in the age before the automobile, was inconvenient due to distance and often, mud-soaked roads. The college decided to build a student bookstore and dining facility closer to campus, but it was shut down in June 1899 after a political upheaval in the college's Board of Regents. That September, a group of students started the Student Co-Operative Association and bought the bookstore.

That bookstore was the cornerstone of what became a developing shopping district for college students, out of a formerly sparsely populated collection of houses. The area gained the nickname Aggieville, from the mascot of the Kansas State Agricultural College Aggies. The name remained even after the mascot was changed to the Wildcat.

After World War I, Aggieville grew. Trolley lines were built, and later paved over during the car boom of the 1940s. In the 1950s, bars and restaurants began to develop and over the next 30 years, Aggieville would become known as an entertainment and dining district.

Auntie Mae's Parlor was founded in 1930, after being converted from a plumbing shop into a speakeasy. The shop's owner, Dora Mae, served alcohol to the residents of Manhattan and passers-by for four years during the Prohibition era, until the bans were ultimately repealed. In 1974, the basement bar was reopened. It hosts live entertainment in the form of music, comedy, and other performing arts.

With the passing of the National Minimum Drinking Age Act of 1984, commerce was reduced in bars in favor of new shops and restaurants. However, with the hiring of Jon Wefald as Kansas State University's new president in 1986, enrollment at the college nearly doubled over the next 20 years and with the increased student population, Aggieville saw a new boom in all types of businesses.

=== Riots ===
The Aggieville riots occurred in 1984 and 1986 following football games between rivals Kansas State University and the University of Kansas. They were some of the earliest collegiate sports-related riots in the United States.

On October 13, 1984, Kansas State defeated KU 24-7 in football. That evening, Kansas State students and townspeople gathered to celebrate the victory in Aggieville. An estimated 6,000 to 8,000 people jammed the main street outside the bars. As night fell, the revelers turned violent, smashing windows and signs, overturning a car, and uprooting street signs. Police who attempted to intervene were chased by students who hurled obscenities and bottles at them. Five police officers were cornered for a time and pelted with rocks and bottles. The Kansas Highway Patrol called Governor John W. Carlin's office to request that he declare a state of emergency and send Kansas National Guard troops, but this was ultimately not done. Ten people were injured, including six police officers. Twenty-four arrests were made.

Two years later, after a number of precautions, another riot spawned after Kansas State again defeated KU 29-12 on October 18, 1986. Students wearing T-shirts that said "Riotville" and "Riot II" mingled with 4,000 to 6,000 people who again filled the main street outside the bars and turned violent at night. Almost every building in Aggieville had its windows smashed, people climbed to the tops of several buildings, and a 1968 Volkswagen Beetle was rolled over and torched. Eighteen arrests were made. Although the property damage was greater in 1986, injuries were limited.

In 1987, Manhattan was again the site of the KSU-KU football game, but this time the town completely cordoned off Aggieville and brought in police officers from all over the state of Kansas to control entry points and patrol the streets inside. The game ended in a 17-17 tie (the "Toilet Bowl"), leaving fans of both teams in no mood to celebrate.

=== 21st century ===
Aggieville hosts the annual "Little Apple New Year's Eve" celebration, where people fill the streets to welcome the new year. At midnight, a brightly lit apple is dropped from the Rally House (formerly Varney's Bookstore) marquee. The celebration brought an estimated 10,000 people to Aggieville on December 31, 2005, and was featured live on Fox News.

The annual "St. Patrick's Day in the Ville" celebration includes restaurants serving green eggs and ham, a road race and family fun run, and a parade. Because this happens during spring break, Aggieville also hosts "Fake Patty's Day" one week prior. This increases criminal offenses, such as underage drinking, assaults and batteries, public urination, noise complaints, driving under the influence, and littering. The event was formally canceled in 2021 although unofficial celebrations still occurred.

== See also ==
- Sports riot
- Student riot
- Sunflower Showdown
- Kansas-Kansas State football rivalry
