= Derby Dining Center =

- Location within Kansas
- Former names: Derby Food Center
- Alternative names: The Derb

General information
- Type: Academic Building
- Architectural style: Standard limestone
- Location: Manhattan Ave. and Old Claflin Rd., Manhattan, Kansas, United States
- Coordinates: 39°11′39.29″N 96°34′39.64″W
- Completed: 1965

Technical details
- Floor count: 2

Website
- Derby Derby Map

Derby Dining Center, named after reference librarian Grace Derby, is the largest dining facility at Kansas State University's Manhattan, KS campus and serves approximately 2,000 students living in Ford, Haymaker, Moore and West Residence Halls. The Derb’ (Derby) is on the East side of campus. T•H•E Bakery, a retail bakery, is located on the ground floor of Derby Dining .

== Architecture ==
This building consists of two floors. The bottom floor houses noteworthy resources available for students as well as The Bakery and rooms for meetings or classes. The upper floor functions as the main dining location with various food lines as well as seating for students, staff and guests.

The outside of the building is stylized with the same historic looking limestone fascia that is predominant of many buildings throughout campus. The renovation project ending in 2021 added a steel feature over the main entrance.

Further notable elements of this building include tunnels that connect each of the four residence halls (Ford, Haymaker, Moore and West) within the Derby complex to the dining center.

== Noteworthy Resources ==
Case Management is available to assist students with various needs.

=== ResNet Help Desk ===
The ResNet Help Desk - Provides technical support for students living in the residence halls and Jardine Apartments at K-State. They assist with network registration, connection issues, and general technical support for computers, mobile devices, printers, or gaming devices.

=== ARH/NRHH ===
The primary office location for the Association of Residence Halls and local chapter of NRHH is housed within the first floor of Derby.
