= Paul Weigel (architect) =

American architect and academic (1889–1984)

- Born: August 5, 1889; New York City, U.S.
- Died: March 7, 1984 (aged 94); Kansas City, Kansas, U.S.
- Occupation: Architect
- Awards: Fellow, American Institute of Architects (1947)

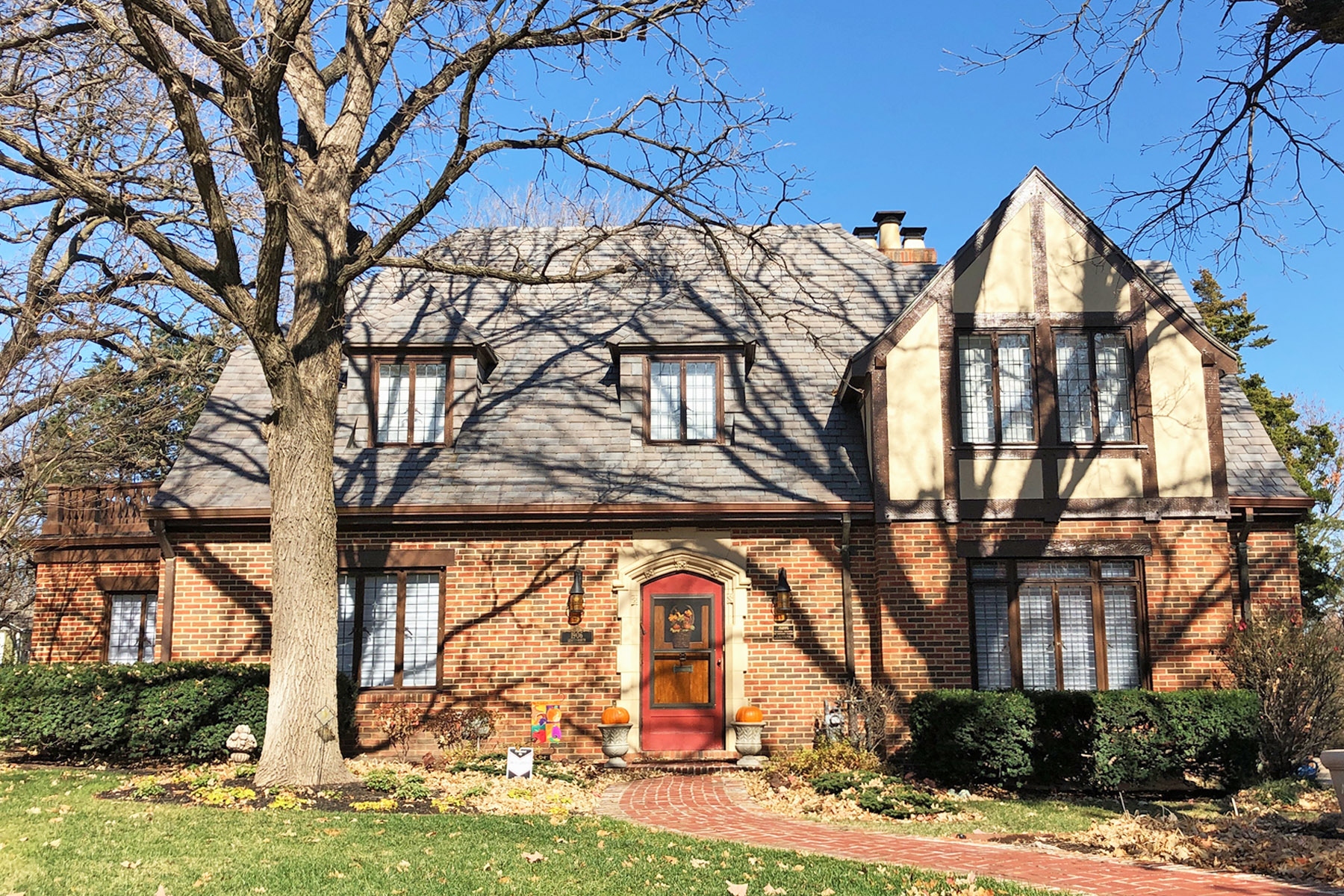
The McFarlane-Wareham House in Manhattan, designed by Weigel and completed in 1928.

Paul Weigel FAIA (August 5, 1889 – March 7, 1984) was an American architect and architectural educator. He was head of the school of architecture of Kansas State University from 1923 until his retirement in 1955.

== Life and career ==
Paul Weigel was born August 5, 1889, in New York City. He was educated at Cornell University, graduating in 1912 with a BArch. Weigel worked in the office of the New York State Architect and on the Panama Canal design staff before opening an architectural office in New York City in 1918. In 1921 he was hired by Kansas State College to teach in its architectural department. In 1923, when Cecil F. Baker, head of the department, stepped down, Weigel was appointed to take his place.

In addition to his teaching and administrative roles, Weigel maintained a small private practice in Manhattan. His work included private and fraternity houses and college buildings. He also consulted on the design of many of the school's buildings. He stepped down from his administrative role in 1955, but remained on the teaching staff until 1959. In 1957 he was retained by the Turkish government to consult on the planning and design of the new Atatürk University. He returned to Manhattan in 1959.

Weigel was the assistant director of the United States rural housing survey in Kansas from 1933 to 1934. He joined the board of the Association of Collegiate Schools of Architecture in 1940. He served as its secretary-treasurer (1940–1947), chair of the committee on employment (1945–1953) and president (1947–1949). As a member of the board he worked to develop greater understanding between the United States' schools of architecture.

Weigel joined the American Institute of Architects (AIA) in 1923 as a member of AIA Kansas. He served as chapter president from 1925 to 1927. In 1947 he was elected a Fellow of the AIA in recognition of his work in education and for his service to the profession and to the public. Weigel was the first Kansas architect to be elected a Fellow under the modern system instituted in 1898.

== Legacy ==
After Weigel retired as department head the Paul Weigel Foundation scholarships were established in his honor by a group of former students. In 1973 the school's architectural library was named the Paul Weigel Library of Architecture & Design. Originally located in Seaton Hall, it was moved to a purpose-built space in Regnier Hall in 2018.

One building designed by Weigel has been listed on the United States National Register of Historic Places.

== Personal life ==
Weigel was married in 1926 to Marie Coons. They had two children, both sons. In 1964 the Weigels moved from Manhattan to Leawood, near Kansas City. He died March 7, 1984, at the University of Kansas Medical Center in Kansas City at the age of 94.

== Architectural works ==
- 1926 – Van Zile Hall, Kansas State University, Manhattan, Kansas
- 1927 – Farrell Library, (Note: Designed by Weigel with final plans prepared by State Architect Charles Cuthbert. Now the Great Room of Hale Library.) Kansas State University, Manhattan, Kansas
- 1928 – McFarlane-Wareham House, (Note: NRHP-listed.) 1906 Leavenworth St, Manhattan, Kansas
- 1928 – Pi Beta Phi sorority house, 505 Denison Ave, Manhattan, Kansas
- 1929 – Alpha Delta Pi fraternity house, 518 Sunset Ave, Manhattan, Kansas
- 1930 – Mattie Coons house, 1922 Leavenworth St, Manhattan, Kansas
- 1932 – Delta Delta Delta sorority house, 1834 Laramie St, Manhattan, Kansas
- 1933 – Beta Theta Pi fraternity house, 500 Sunset Ave, Manhattan, Kansas
- 1938 – Alpha Xi Delta sorority house, 601 Fairchild Ter, Manhattan, Kansas
- 1949 – Danforth Chapel, Kansas State University, Manhattan, Kansas
