= Durland–Rathbone–Fiedler-Engineering Hall =

Durland-Rathbone-Fiedler-Engineering Hall
- Interactive map of the Durland-Rathbone-Fiedler-Engineering Hall area
- Alternative names: Main Engineering Building

General information
- Type: Academic Building
- Location: Kansas State University, Manhattan, Kansas, United States
- Coordinates: 39°11′26″N 96°35′4″W
- Current tenants: KSU College of Engineering
- Completed: 1976 (Durland); 1983 (Rathbone); 2000 (Fiedler); 2016 (Engineering Expansion)
- Renovated: 2007 Durland Study Room, Cafe-Q

Technical details
- Floor count: 3

Website
- Durland, Rathbone, Fiedler

Durland Hall, Rathbone Hall, Fiedler Hall and Engineering Hall are the names of four wings of the main building in the engineering complex on the campus of Kansas State University. The building is set on the old football practice field.

Additional engineering building include Ward Hall and the "Architecture" wing of Seaton Hall.

In 2016, an expansion to the original wings of the engineering complex was completed.

== Construction and Naming ==
Durland Hall was the first wing constructed in 1976 at a cost of over $3 million. The building is named after Dean Merrill A. Durland, a Kansas State College graduate, professor, and Dean of the School of Engineering and Architecture, and Director of the Engineering Experiment Station.

Rathbone Hall was added on the north end of Durland Hall in 1982 at a cost of $8 million. The building is named after former dean of Engineering, Donald E. Rathbone.

Fiedler Hall was added onto the west end of Rathbone Hall and was completed in 2000. The building was dedicated on September 9, 2000 to George and Alice Fiedler. George was an inductee into the Kansas State Engineering Hall of Fame.

== Other Complex History ==
In the winter of 2007 the second floor Student Study Room was built and replaced the former All Student Lounge area. This opened in the Spring of 2008 along with the Cafe-Q on the first floor that had been constructed the previous fall.

Fiedler and Rathbone Halls were heavily damaged, suffering broken windows and collapsed roofing structures due to an EF4 tornado on June 11, 2008.

== Facilities ==
The Chemical Engineering computer laboratory located within the Durland wing is a common meeting ground for many chemical engineers to discuss class developments, as well as to converse with members of the faculty.

The three Mechanical and Nuclear Engineering computer laboratories located within Rathbone and Ward Halls are a common meeting ground for many Mechanical and Nuclear engineers, as well as members of the faculty. These labs are often considered among the best on campus.

Fiedler Hall is also home to Fiedler Library, which is an offshoot of Hale, the main campus library. In addition to serving as a "sub-library" it provides the students with a more focused line of literature that is more aligned with the overall nature of the Engineering complex.
