= Goodnow House =

Historic house in Kansas, United States

- U.S. National Register of Historic Places
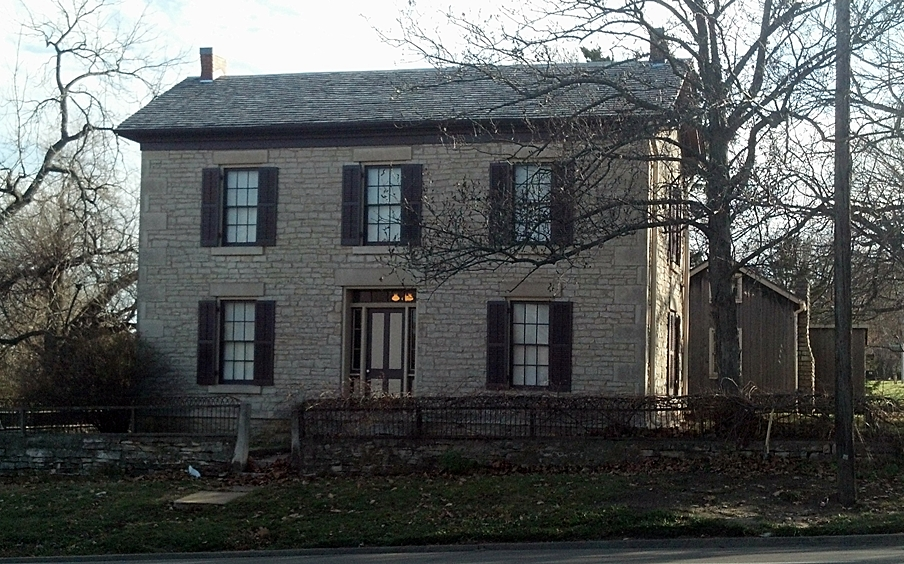
- Goodnow House (2012)

- Location within Kansas Location within the United States
- Location: 2301 Claflin Road, Manhattan, Kansas
- Coordinates: 39°11′34″N 96°35′43″W
- Built: 1857
- Architectural style: Plains Vernacular
- NRHP reference No.: 71000326
- Added to NRHP: February 24, 1971

The Goodnow House is a historic two-story stone house located at 2301 Claflin Road in Manhattan, Kansas, United States. It was built in 1857 in the Plains Vernacular style. From 1861 Isaac Goodnow and his wife, Ellen lived in the house. Goodnow was an abolitionist and co-founder of both Kansas State University and Manhattan.

== Description ==
The Goodnow House is a stone structure with gable roofs over a two-story main block and a one-story wing. The rough limestone walls are accented by smooth quoins at the corners. Several additions were made over the years. There is a cellar under the 1857 section.

== History ==
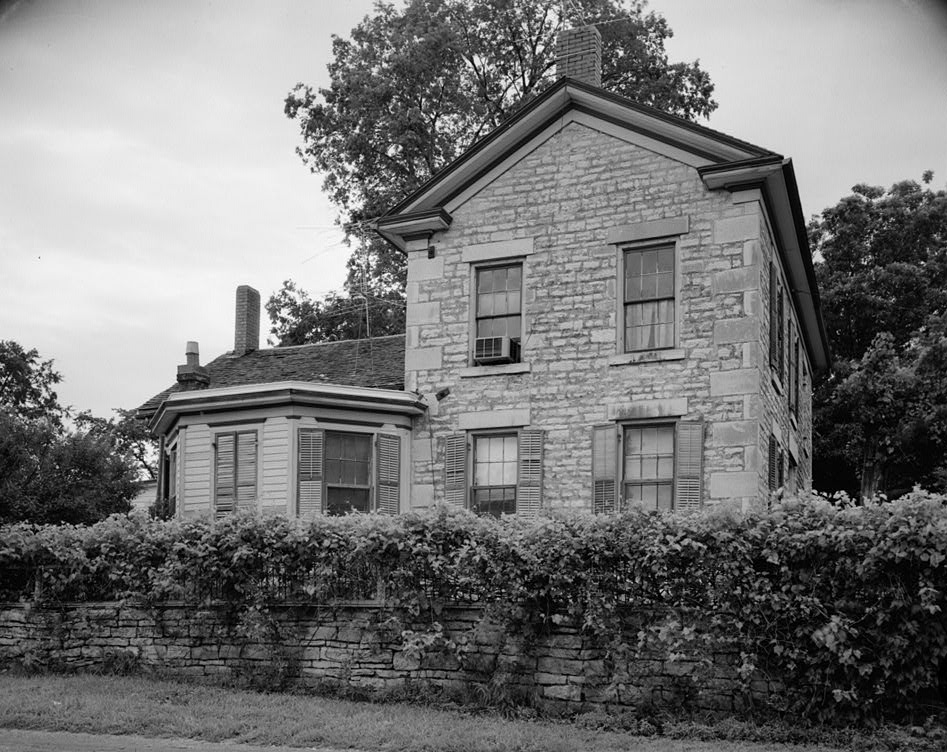
Goodnow House in June 1958 prior to restoration.

Goodnow and his wife Ellen had no children. Hattie Parkerson, a niece whom they had adopted, inherited the house after Ellen died in 1900. After Hattie's death in 1940, the house was passed to a friend, Mary Payne, who later donated it and many of the Goodnow's belongings to the Kansas Historical Society, a state agency which operates it today as the Goodnow House State Historic Site.

On February 24, 1971, the Goodnow House was added to the National Register of Historic Places.

The house "tells the story of free-staters".
