= Ford Hall =

Ford Hall may refer to:

- Ford Hall Forum, the oldest free public lecture series in the United States.
- Ford Hall, located on the campus of Berry College.
- Ford Hall, located on the campus of Brandeis University.
- Ford Hall, a chapel in Derbyshire, United Kingdom.
- Ford Hall, located on the campus of Eastern Illinois University.
- Ford Hall, located on the campus of Eastern Michigan University which serves as a gallery and administration building.
- Ford Hall, Ice District, Edmonton, Alberta, Canada
- Ford Hall, located on the campus of Ithaca College.
- Ford Hall (Kansas State University), an all-female residence hall at Kansas State University.
- Ford Hall, located on the campus of the University of Louisville.
- Ford Hall, located on the campus of Northwest Nazarene University.
- Ford Hall, located on the campus of the University of Minnesota.
- Ford Hall, located on the campus of Rutgers University.
- Ford Hall, located on the campus of Smith College.
- Ford Hall, located on the campus of Suffolk University.
- Ford Hall, located on the campus of SUNY Oneonta.
- Ford Hall (Willamette University), located on the campus of Willamette University in Oregon.
- Ford Hall, located on the campus of Williston Northampton School.
