= Kansas State University College of Engineering =

Coordinates: 39°11′26″N 96°35′03″W

Carl R. Ice College of Engineering
- Established: 1897
- Parent institution: Kansas State University
- Dean: Matthew J. O'Keefe
- Location: Manhattan, Kansas
- Colors: Purple
- Website: engg.k-state.edu

The Kansas State University Carl R. Ice College of Engineering offers 12 undergraduate majors and one undecided program, as well as multiple minors, and graduate programs of study. The undergraduate engineering program is ranked among the top 100 engineering schools in the United States.

== Programs ==
- Multicultural Engineering Program
- Women in Engineering (WiE)

== Facilities ==
The college is housed in six halls situated on the west side of the Kansas State University campus in Manhattan, Kansas. This includes the following structures:

- Durland-Rathbone-Fiedler-Engineering Hall
  - Durland Hall - CHE
  - Engineering Hall - CS, ECE
  - Fiedler Hall - CE
  - Rathbone Hall - Main engineering, IMSE, MNE
- Ward Hall - MNE
- Seaton Hall - BAE, ARE/CNS

In addition to these buildings, several off-campus locations house experimentation labs and support facilities.

== Student involvement ==
More than 60 student organizations and competition teams are offered for those seeking to meet other students and apply skills learned in the classroom. Each of the eight college departments sponsor at least one club or organization. These include the Concrete Canoe Team, Steel Bridge Team, SAE Aero Design Team, Helwig Farms Quarter-Scale Tractor Team, Powercat Motorsports, SAE Baja Team and K-State Robotic Competition Team. The American Indian Science and Engineering Society, Engineering Ambassadors, Engineering Student Council, Society of Women Engineers (SWE), National Society of Black Engineers, Society of Hispanic Professional Engineers and Steel Ring Honorary Society represent college-wide organizations.

== Research ==
K-State engineering has numerous research centers, groups, laboratories, institutes and programs, as well as ongoing multidisciplinary efforts within engineering, and among other colleges and universities around the world.

== See also ==
- University of Kansas School of Engineering
