= Overmyer =

Overmyer is a surname. Notable people with the surname include:

- Amanda Overmyer (born 1984), American rock singer-songwriter
- Arthur W. Overmyer (1879–1952), American politician and judge
- Bill Overmyer (born 1949), American football player
- David Hicks Overmyer (1889–1973), American muralist
- Daniel H. Overmyer (1924–2012), American businessman
- Daniel L. Overmyer (1935–2021), Canadian historian of Chinese religion
- Eric Overmyer (1951–2026), American writer and producer
- Patrick Overmyer (born 2005), American football player
- Robert F. Overmyer (1936–1996), test pilot, naval aviator, aeronautical engineer, physicist, United States Marine Corps officer and astronaut

== See also ==
- Overmyer Network, an American television network from 1966 to 1967
