= Thomas H. Beeby =

American architect (born 1941)

- Born: 1941 (age 84–85); Oak Park, Illinois, U.S.
- Education: Cornell University; Yale University
- Occupation: Architect
- Awards: Driehaus Prize (2013)
- Buildings: The Harold Washington Library Center
- Website: HBRA Architects

Thomas H. Beeby (born 1941) is an American architect who was a member of the "Chicago Seven" architects and has been Chairman Emeritus of Hammond, Beeby, Rupert, Ainge Architects (HBRA) for over thirty-nine years.

He is a representative of New Urbanism and New Classical Architecture.

== Biography and career ==
An Oak Park, Illinois native, Beeby received a bachelor's degree in architecture from Cornell in 1964 and a master's degree in architecture from Yale in 1965. In 1971, Beeby and James Hammond founded Hammond Beeby & Associates (now HBRA). After teaching for six years at the Illinois Institute of Technology and serving as Director of the University of Illinois at Chicago School of Architecture, he served from 1985 to 1992 as dean of the Yale School of Architecture, where he remains an adjunct professor. Beeby was elected to the College of Fellows of the American Institute of Architects in 1991.

As one of the "Chicago Seven" architects who challenged modernist orthodoxy in the 1970s and 1980s, Beeby helped bring traditional architecture and urban design back into the public consciousness. Pulitzer Prize-winning Chicago Tribune architecture critic Blair Kamin, reflecting on the group's influence in 2005, commended the "critical spirit that helped the Chicago Seven alter the course of the city's architecture."

Chairman Emeritus of Hammond Beeby Rupert Ainge Architects (HBRA), Beeby spent over 40 years as the firm's Director of Design, leading projects such as the James Baker Institute at Rice University, Meadows Museum at Southern Methodist University, the Bass Library at Yale University, and the United States Federal Building and Courthouse in Tuscaloosa, Alabama. Seven of Beeby's projects have received the National Honor Award, the highest design distinction, from the American Institute of Architects, including the Hole in the Wall Gang Camp for Paul Newman in Ashford, Connecticut, the Rice Wing at the Art Institute of Chicago, and the master plan for Paternoster Square in London with John Simpson and Terry Farrell. Progressive Architecture cited three of Beeby's public library designs, including the Sulzer Regional Library and the Harold Washington Library Center in Chicago.

== Major projects ==
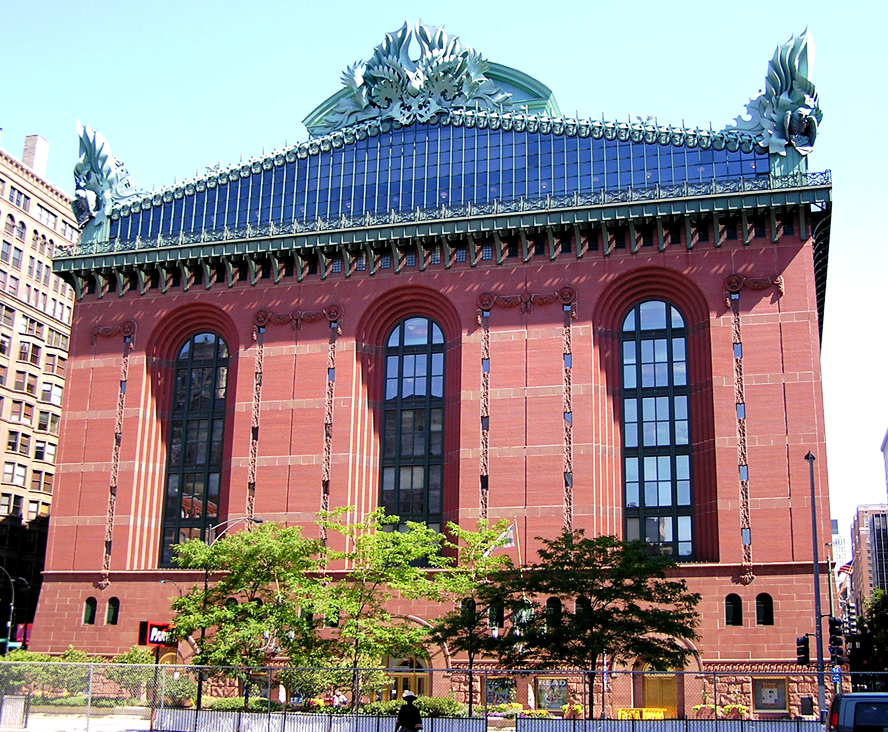
The Harold Washington Library Center, Chicago, Illinois (1991)

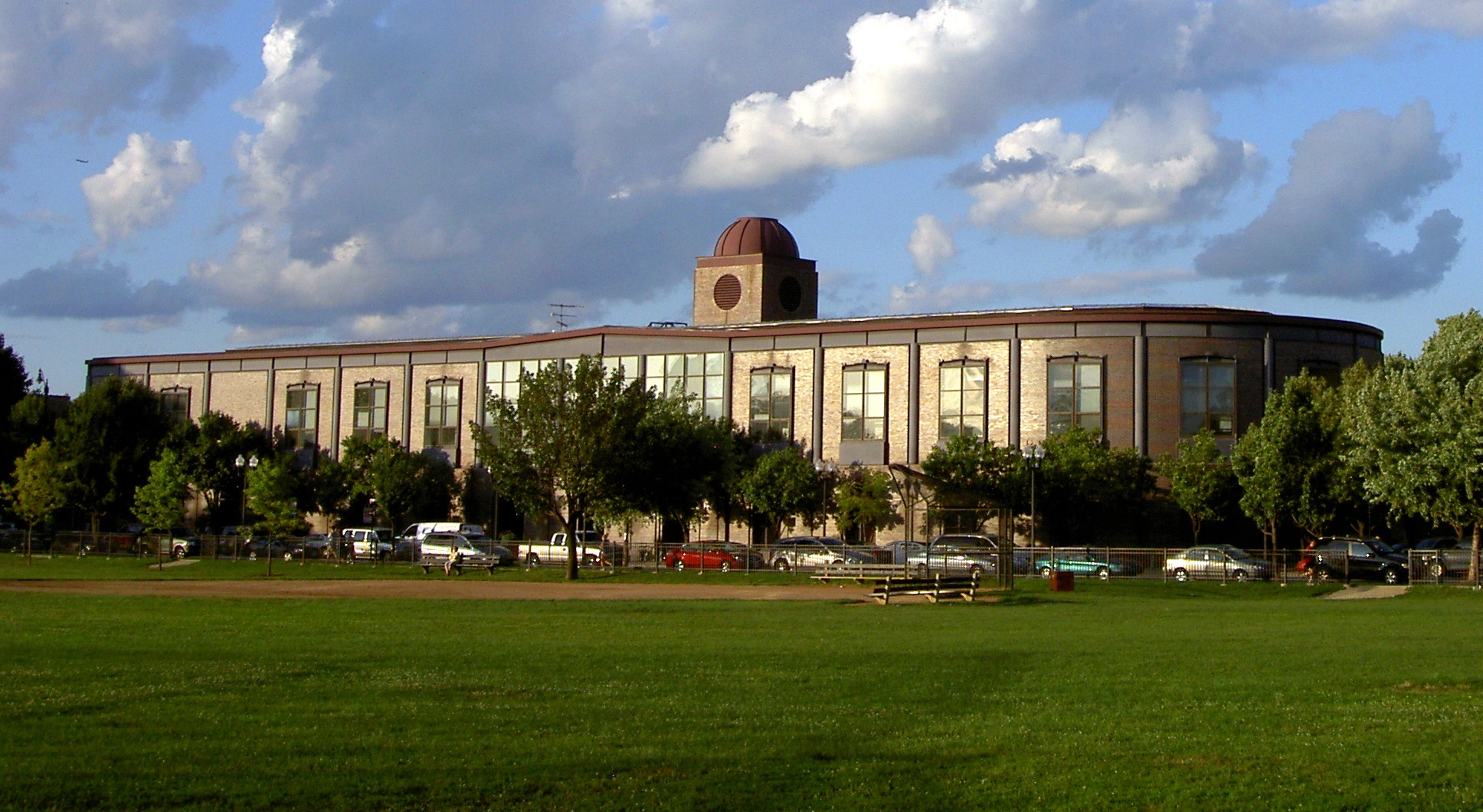
Conrad Sulzer Regional Library, Chicago, Illinois (1985)

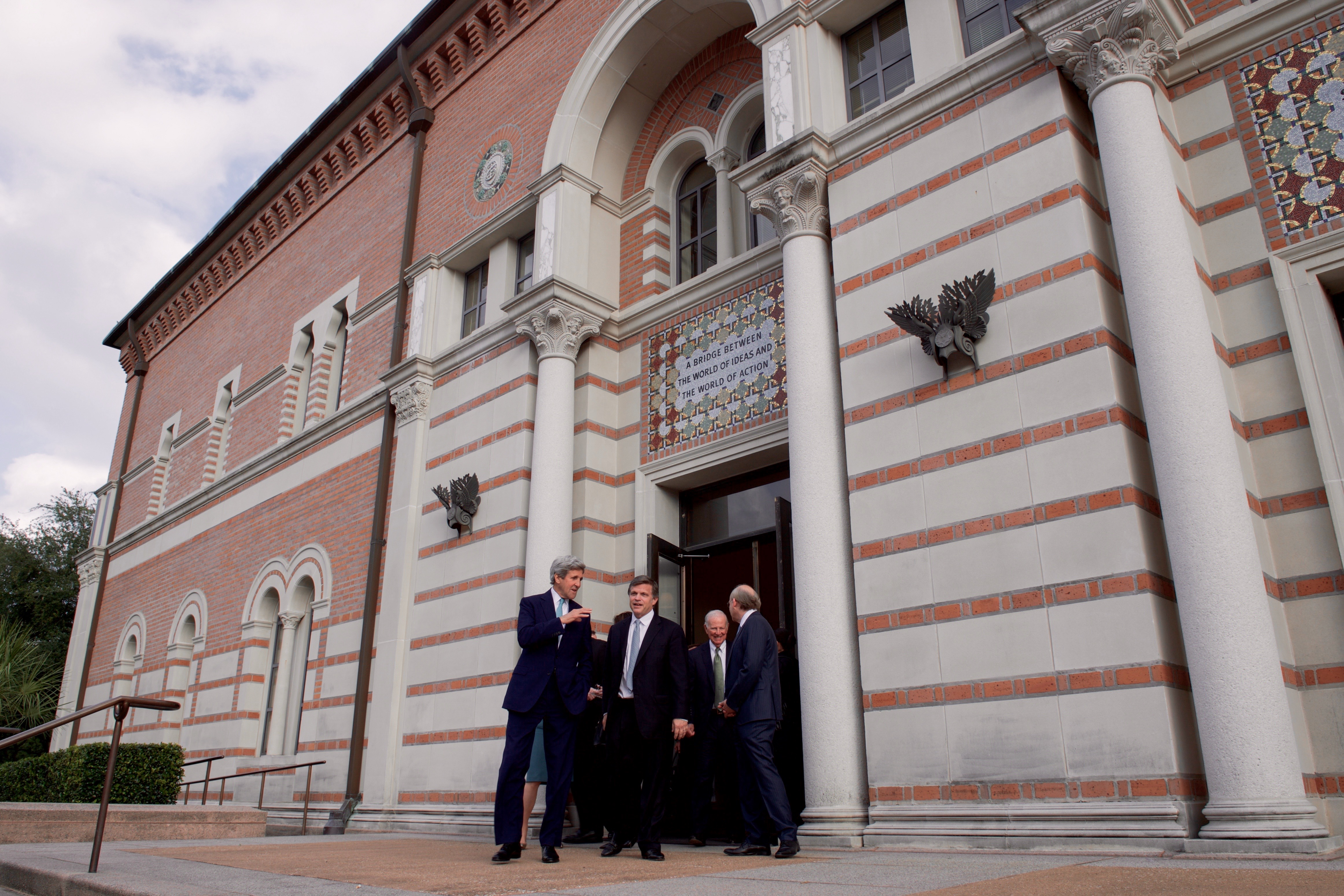
The James A. Baker III Institute for Public Policy, Rice University, Houston, Texas (1994)

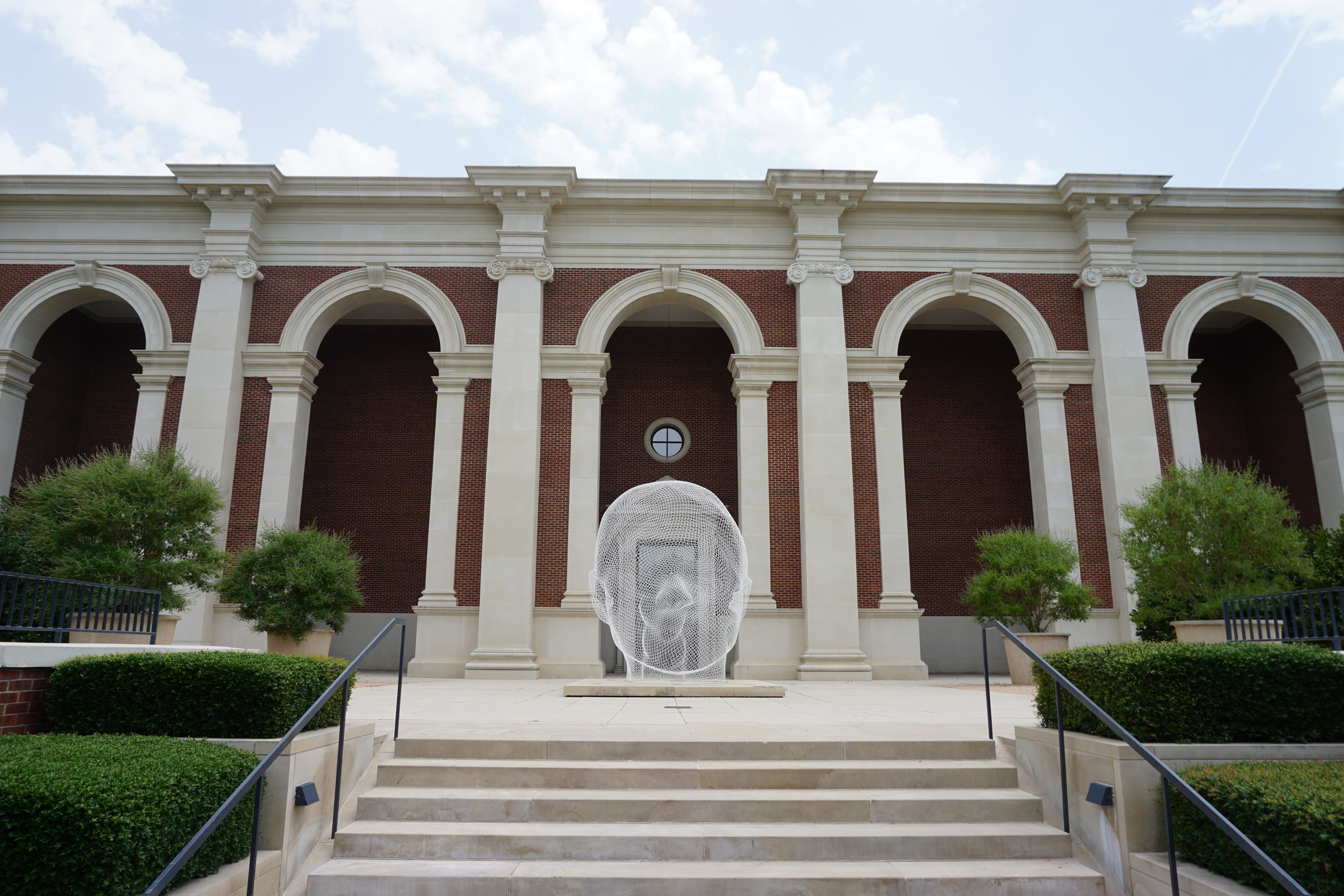
Meadows Museum, Southern Methodist University, Dallas, Texas (2001)

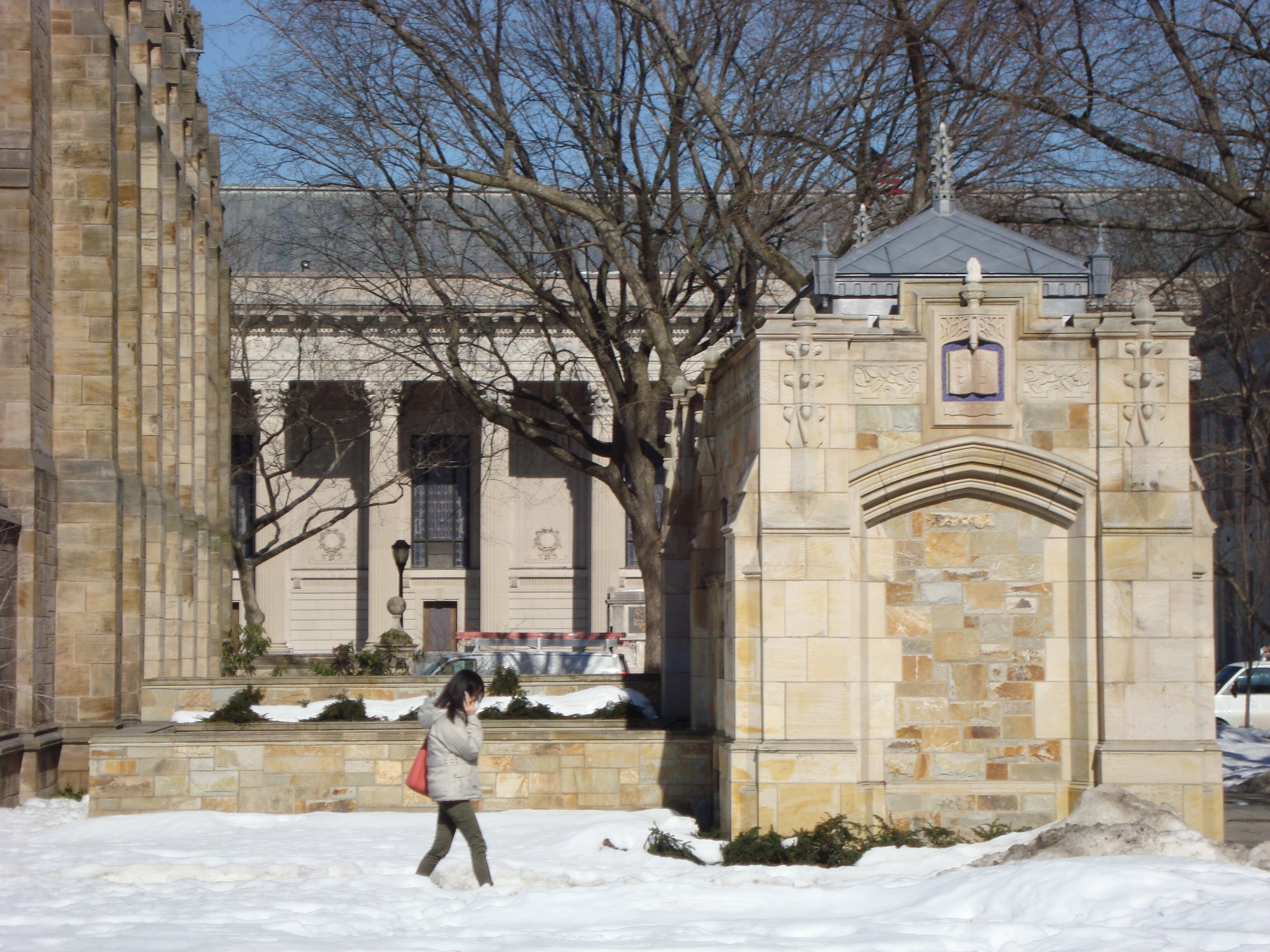
Anne T. & Robert M. Bass Library renovation, Yale University, New Haven, Connecticut (2007)

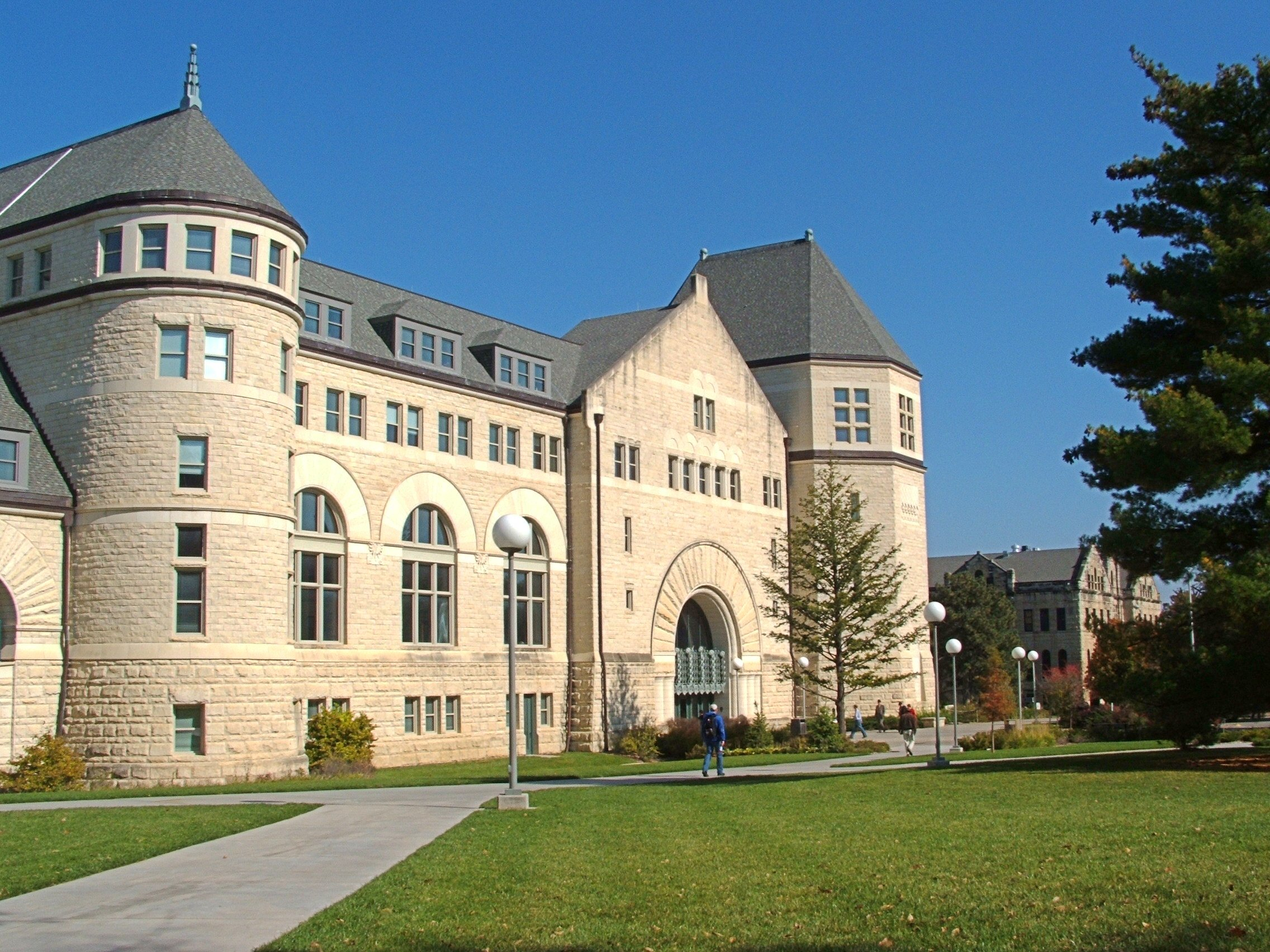
Farrell Library Renovation/Hale Library Addition, Kansas State University, Manhattan, Kansas (1999)
- American Academy of Pediatrics headquarters, Itasca, Illinois
- Bannockburn Green Retail Center, Bannockburn, Illinois
- United States Federal Building and Courthouse, Tuscaloosa, Alabama
- Daniel F. and Ada L. Rice Building, Art Institute of Chicago, Sculpture Court
- Taft School, New Athletic Facility, Watertown, Connecticut
- Hole in the Wall Gang Camp, Ashford, Connecticut
- Harris Theater for Music and Dance, Chicago, Illinois

=== 1985 to 1992 Dean of the Yale School of Architecture Initiatives & Projects ===
- Supported and encouraged Yale Journal of Architecture and Feminism

== Awards ==
In 2013 Beeby was awarded the 11th Driehaus Architecture Prize. The Driehaus Prize, administered by the University of Notre Dame, is the world's best-known prize for contemporary classical and traditional architecture. He received $200,000 and a bronze miniature of the Choragic Monument of Lysicrates.

== See also ==
- Chicago Seven
- Richard H. Driehaus Prize for Classical Architecture
