= Joseph Denison (pastor) =

Methodist pastor

Joseph J. Denison
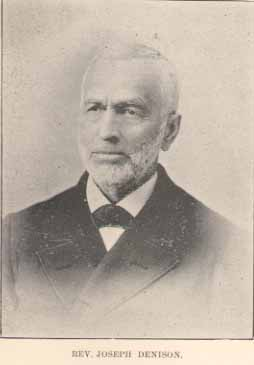
- Born: October 1, 1815; Bernardston, Massachusetts
- Died: February 19, 1900 (aged 84); Manhattan, Kansas

Joseph J. Denison (October 1, 1815 – February 19, 1900) was a Methodist pastor; the first President of Kansas State University; and a founder of Manhattan, Kansas, having volunteered to go to Kansas Territory with the New England Emigrant Aid Company in 1855 to fight against the extension of slavery.

Denison was born in Bernardston, Massachusetts and raised in Colrain, Massachusetts. He graduated from Wesleyan University in 1840, and then served as a Methodist pastor in Massachusetts until 1855.

== Founder of a town and college ==
In 1855, Denison was convinced by his brother-in-law, Isaac Goodnow, that he should move to Kansas Territory to help establish a new town for the New England Emigrant Aid Company. On March 13, 1855, Denison joined a party of Company members leaving Boston, and made his way to Kansas Territory, which was soon to boil over with violence. (See Bleeding Kansas.) Over the next several years Denison was part of a small group that settled and built the abolitionist town of Manhattan, Kansas, at the union of the Kansas River and the Big Blue River in the Flint Hills.

By 1857 Denison and Goodnow, along with others, hatched a plan to create a Methodist college in Manhattan. In April 1857, at a meeting of the Methodist Church Conference, a plan for the college was properly inaugurated. The following year, on February 9, 1858, Manhattan's "Blue Mont Central College" was incorporated by act of the Kansas Territorial Legislature and Territorial Governor James Denver. By 1860, a large building was erected and the school was open and operating with Goodnow as President. Denison was appointed President of BCC in March, 1863. However, the institution struggled financially.

== University President ==
When Kansas was admitted to the United States in 1861, one of the first things the new state Legislature planned to do was to establish a state university. After two years of political wrangling, on February 16, 1863, the state accepted Manhattan's offer to donate the Blue Mont College building and grounds, and established the state's Land-grant university at the site – the institution that would become Kansas State University.

At the first meeting of the state Board of Regents on July 23, 1863, Denison was hired as the first President of Kansas State Agricultural College. He served in this position for ten years. During his term, Denison managed a number of important accomplishments, including establishing a faculty and acquiring valuable land that would later become the center of the university. Under his direction, the school attracted Benjamin Franklin Mudge as Chair of the geology department; Mudge led his Kansas State students on fossil-collecting expeditions to Western Kansas as part of the Bone Wars. Despite Denison's accomplishments, the state asked for his resignation in 1873.

After leaving Kansas State, Denison was hired as President of Baker University, a Methodist school in Baldwin City, Kansas. He held this position from 1874 to 1879, before retiring to work with the Methodist church in the town he helped settle, Manhattan. He died on February 19, 1900, in Manhattan, which had by then grown into a thriving college town of 3,500.

== Legacy ==
- Two buildings have been named Denison Hall on the Kansas State University campus. The first burned down in 1934 and the second was demolished in 2005. There is currently no building named in his honor on the K-State campus.
