= Royal Purple (disambiguation) =

Royal purple, or Tyrian purple, is an ancient dye, or the color of that dye.

Royal Purple may also refer to:

- Royal Purple (lubricant manufacturer), an American manufacturer which produces lubricants for automotive, industrial, marine, motorcycle, and racing use.
- Royal purple (color), a shade of purple
- Royal Purple Yearbook, the official yearbook of Kansas State University
- Royal purple plant, Strobilanthes dyeriana

== See also ==
- Royal Arch Purple
