= Hale Library =

Main library building on Kansas State University's Manhattan, United States

Coordinates: 39°11′25.79″N 96°34′50.03″W

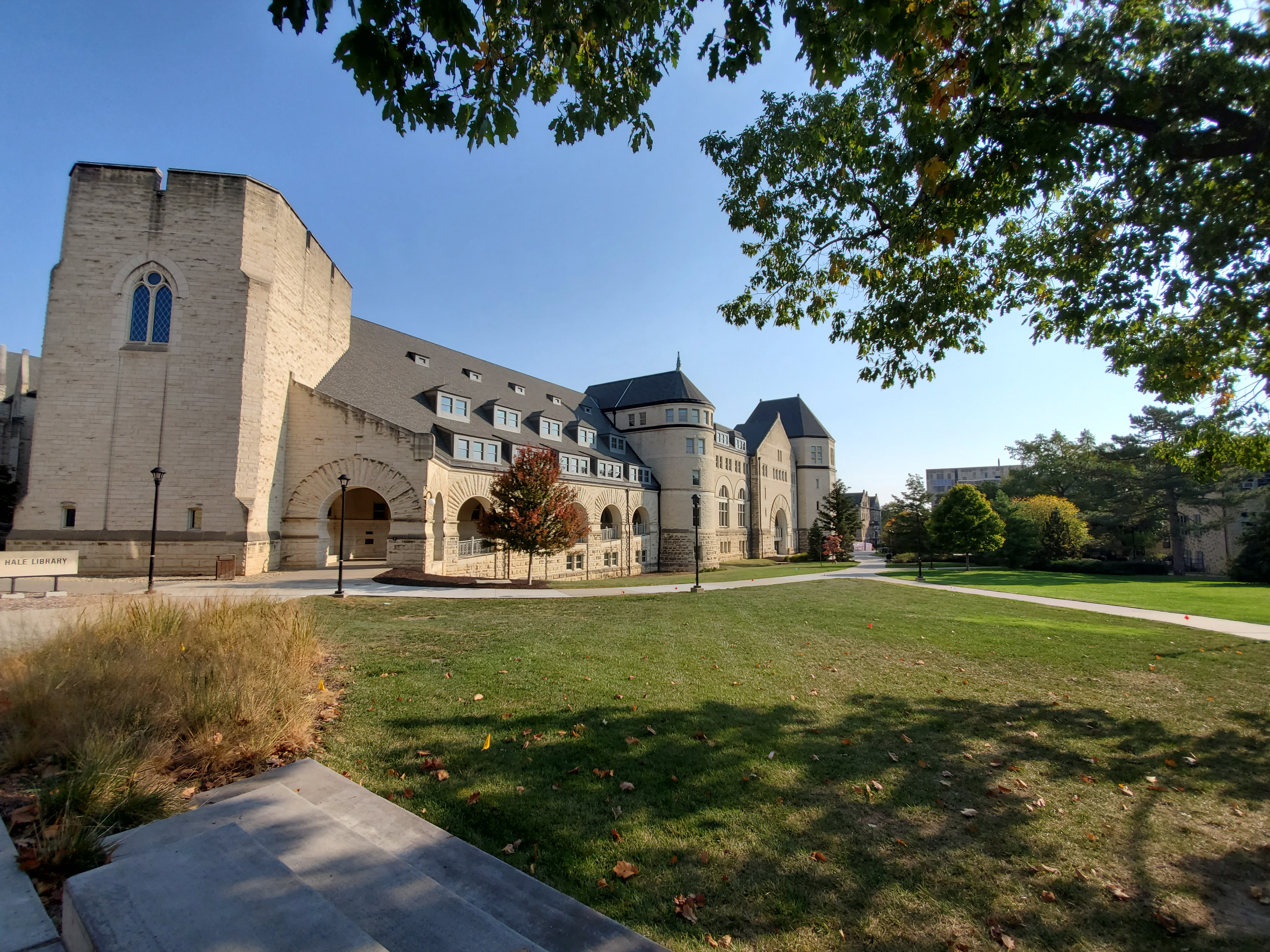
- Hale library in fall
- Interactive map of the Hale Library area
- Former names: Farrell Library

General information
- Type: Academic Library
- Architectural style: Romanesque Revival
- Location: Kansas State University, Manhattan, Kansas, United States
- Completed: 1927 (Campus Library); 1955 (Farrell Library); 1970 (Southeast); 1997 (Hale Library)

Technical details
- Floor count: 5 and basement

Design and construction
- Architects: Paul Weigel and Charles Cuthbert (1927); Hammond Beeby Babka and Brent Bowman & Associates (1997)

Website
- www.lib.k-state.edu

Hale Library is the main library building on Kansas State University's Manhattan, Kansas campus.

== History ==
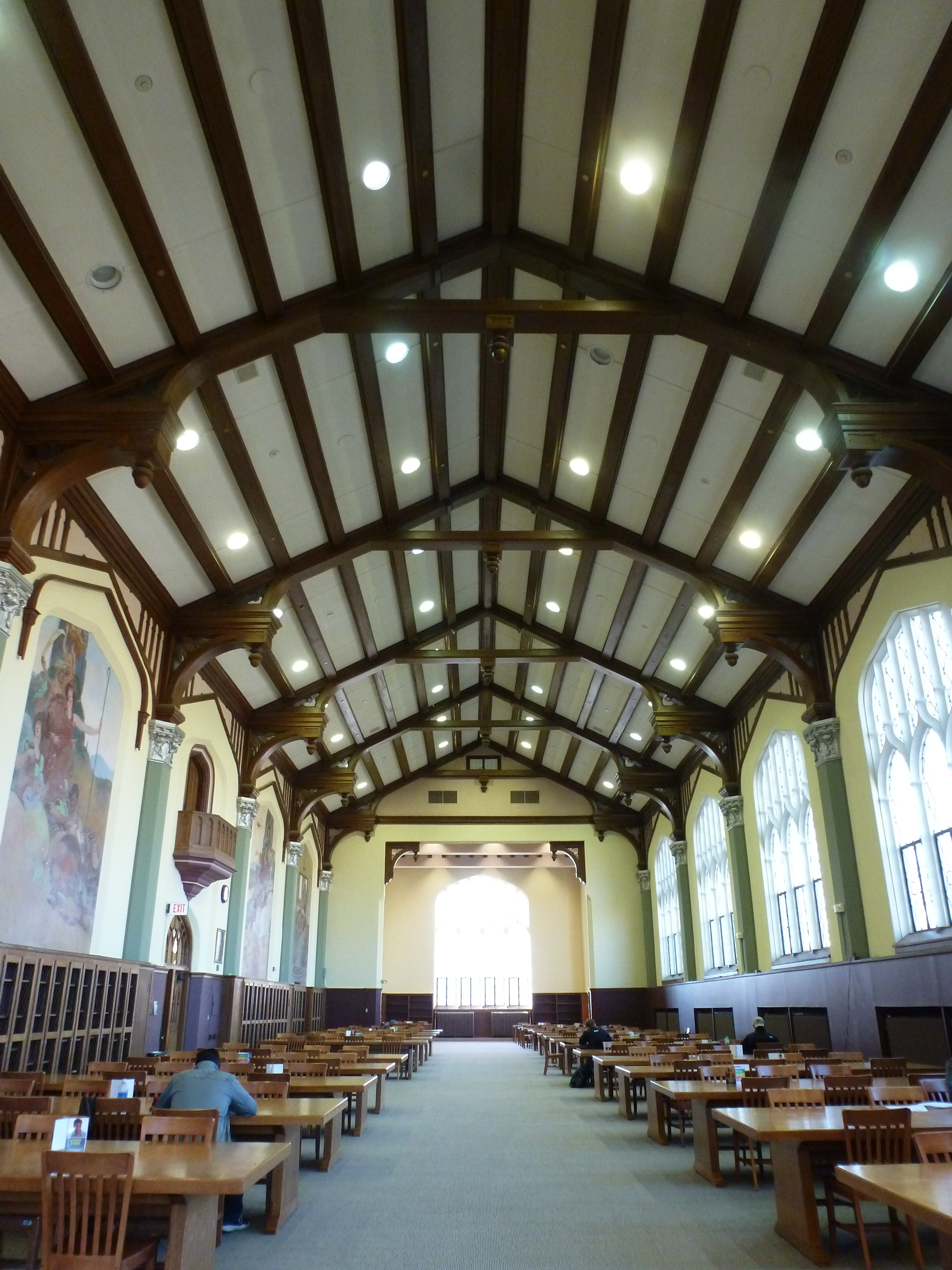
The "Great Room", part of the original library. On the left side of the picture, the murals by David Hicks Overmyer are visible.

On October 5, 1997, Hale Library was officially dedicated, ending an 80-year architectural odyssey and ushering in a new world of library resources, both traditional and electronic. The original college library was completed in 1927, making it the first building on the Kansas State Agricultural College's campus devoted solely to housing the library. The building was designed by architect Paul Weigel with final plans from the office of State Architect Charles Cuthbert. The historic library has a room of major interest, called the "Great Room" which features murals by David Hicks Overmyer completed in 1934 and highlighting the Agricultural College's strengths of "1) science and industry, 2) agricultural and animal husbandry 3) the arts [and] 4) the home". The preliminary studies for the mural are currently held by the Marianna Kistler Beach Museum of Art on the Kansas State University Manhattan Campus.

Lack of space continued to be a problem and, in 1955, a stacks addition was completed to the south of the library. At that time, the library was named in honor of Francis David Farrell, the university's eighth president (1925–1943). To alleviate overcrowding, a second addition to the southeast was completed in 1970.

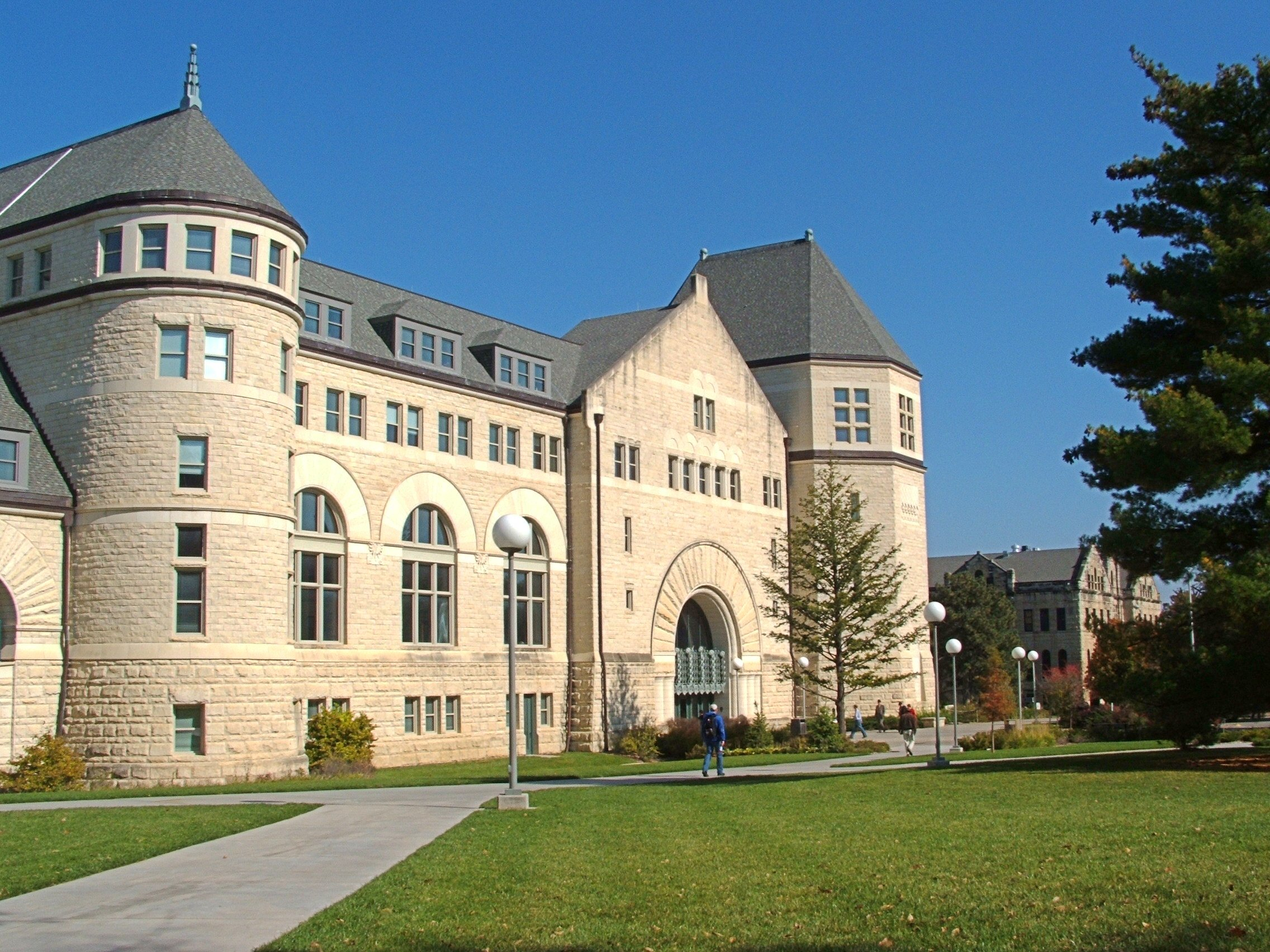
Exterior of Hale Library

1955 stacks addition

Growth of collections and services, combined with a severe reduction in quality study space, led to outside consultants recommending that the library be expanded at a cost of $28 million. With dwindling state resources for construction projects, a new means of funding a new library had to be found. Three components came together to fund the project: a federal windfall of funds to the state allowed Governor Joan Finney to allocate $18 million for the construction; K-State students passed a referendum to provide $5 million; and Joe and Joyce Hale, impressed with the students’ financial commitment, came forward with $5 million which was used to fund the last addition to the building in 1997. Without all three, the library addition and renovation could not have been built. To recognize the essential contribution of the Hales, the new library was named in their honor. To acknowledge the importance of the original library and its namesake, the 1927 structure retains the designation of “Historic Farrell Library” and the main entry to Hale is officially known as the Farrell Entrance.

Other major donors provided funding to the library including the Kansas Farm Bureau Insurance Co., Andreas Foundation, Archer Daniels Midland Foundation, Dow Chemical, William R. Love, Richard and Marjorie Morse, and Mr. and Mrs. Dan Wassenberg. The Friends of the Libraries, founded in 1984, has provided funding for numerous acquisitions, furniture, and equipment. Students continue to support the library through funding initiatives that include computer stations for the InfoCommons, SFX software, and the Google Search Appliance.

One of the major goals of the new library was to assimilate the old and the new structures, architecturally and aesthetically. The design team of Brent Bowman & Associates (now BBN Architects Inc) of Manhattan, Kansas, in association with Hammond Beeby Babka (now HBRA) of Chicago, Illinois, were commissioned to design a comprehensive expansion and renovation project that would double the size of the existing campus library while integrating additions dating from 1951 and 1970. With that in mind, the construction encased and expanded the west, south, and east sides of the previous library, while leaving the original 1927 building exposed to preserve its historic beauty and significance. In 1999, Hale Library received the Merit Award for Excellence from the American Institute of Architects for the central states region.

On the interior, the library was designed to be user-friendly and house the collections, services, and departments necessary to anticipate and provide the needs of the 21st century. In addition to providing traditional library material, the library provides digital and interlibrary services, and the Information Technology Assistance Center (iTAC) is housed in Hale. The K-State Libraries has entered a cooperative agreement with the University of Kansas to house bound volumes in a shared storage facility in Lawrence, Kansas.

Hale Library, the largest building on the K-State campus, includes five floors and a basement. As of 2018, it holds 1.5 million items plus special collections and archives.

Hale Library suffered smoke and water damage stemming from a fire which unintentionally broke out on the rooftop during May 2018. The library was closed into the 2020–2021 academic year. Special Collections and University Archives did not have any ensuing water damage but did have some damage from smoke. The Library was renovated with student's needs in mind, adding outlets and study spaces. The Great Room and the David Overmyer murals, which suffered water and smoke damage in the fire, were restored in this renovation. While 85% of the building was damaged in some way during the fire, less than 1% of Hale's original collection was lost. Restoration and renovation efforts after the fire totalled upwards of $90 million as of October 2019.

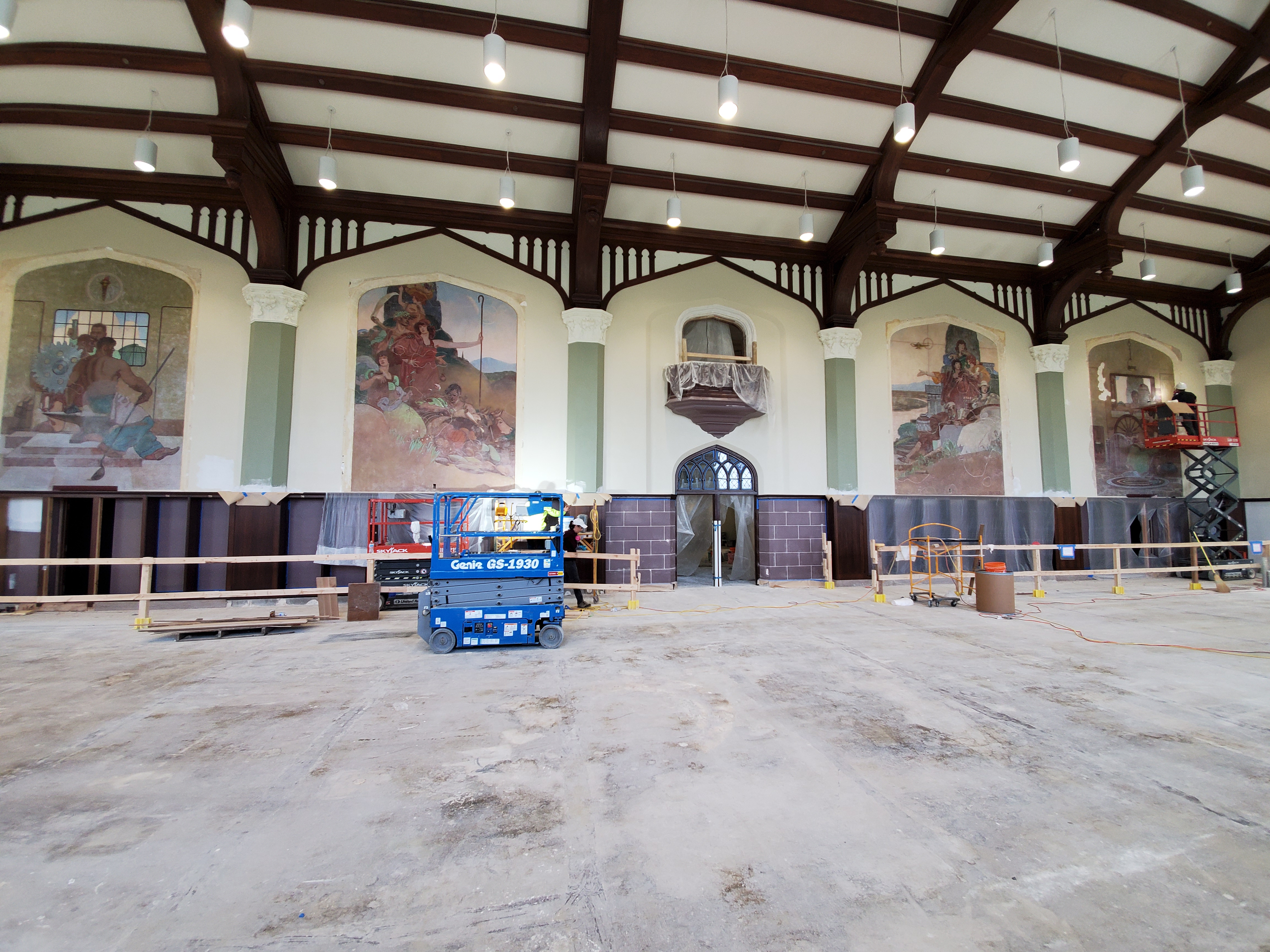
Great Room murals undergoing preservation

== Notes ==
=== Works cited ===
- North, Bill (January 2003). ...to build up a rich collection...:Selected Works From the Marianna Kistler Beach Museum of Art. Marianna Kistler Beach Museum of Art. ISBN 1-890751-11-1.
