= Isaac Goodnow =

American politician (1814–1894)

- Born: January 17, 1814; Whitingham, Vermont
- Died: March 20, 1894 (aged 80); Manhattan, Kansas

Isaac Tichenor Goodnow (January 17, 1814 – March 20, 1894) was an abolitionist and co-founder of Kansas State University and Manhattan, Kansas. Goodnow was also elected as a Republican to the Kansas House of Representatives and as Superintendent of Public Instruction for the state, and is known as "the father of formal education in Kansas."

== Career as educator ==
Goodnow was born in Whitingham, Vermont, and raised in New England. After the death of his father in 1828, Goodnow delayed his education and worked as a clerk. He eventually graduated from Wilbraham Wesleyan Academy in Wilbraham, Massachusetts in 1838. Also in 1838, Goodnow married Ellen D. Denison. Following graduation, Goodnow remained at Wesleyan Academy as a teacher until 1848. During this era, Goodnow was also awarded an honorary degree by Wesleyan University in 1845.

In 1848 Goodnow accepted a position as professor of natural sciences at the Providence Conference Seminary (East Greenwich Academy) in East Greenwich, Rhode Island. He retained this position until December 1854, when he resigned at age 40 to move to Kansas Territory to support the creation of a Free-State town by the New England Emigrant Aid Company.

== Kansas emigrant ==
Goodnow had been a committed abolitionist since at least 1840. After hearing a speech given by New England Emigrant Aid Company founder Eli Thayer in December 1854 about the need to fight against the proslavery influence in Kansas Territory, Goodnow decided that he would emigrate to Kansas Territory with the Company the following spring. Thereafter, he also began writing editorials and letters encouraging others to join the cause.

On March 6, 1855, Goodnow departed Boston, Massachusetts, with a group of New England emigrants that would ultimately number 75. On March 18, Goodnow's party reached Kansas City, where Goodnow met with the Company's representative Samuel C. Pomeroy and decided to form the Company's new settlement at the junction of the Kansas River and the Big Blue River. Goodnow and six other men traveled into Kansas Territory as an advance guard to establish the location.

When Goodnow's team arrived, two other small settlements had already been established at the chosen location, named Polistra and Canton. In April 1855, Goodnow and the other pioneers combined the settlements into a new town named Boston. Goodnow helped to draft the constitution for the Boston Town Company. Two months later, in June 1855, the steamboat Hartford, carrying 75 settlers from Ohio, ran aground in the Kansas River near the settlement. The Hartford passengers accepted an invitation to join the new town, but insisted that it be renamed Manhattan, which was done on June 29, 1855.

Goodnow established a claim just outside Manhattan, and was joined by his wife in July 1855. Other settlers arriving in Manhattan that year included his brother, William Goodnow; his sister, Lucinda Parkerson; and his brother-in-law, Joseph Denison.

== Bleeding Kansas ==
After the Territorial Legislature in Shawnee Mission began passing proslavery laws in July 1855, Free-Staters met to decide how to respond. In August 1855, Goodnow attended the first territory-wide meeting of Free-State leaders. Ultimately, the group decided to form a shadow government and drafted the Topeka Constitution, although Goodnow did not participate in the constitutional convention.

In 1858, Goodnow was a delegate to the Leavenworth Constitutional Convention, which produced the most liberal of the three proposed Free-State constitutions.

== Institution builder ==
Goodnow helped establish the Methodist Blue Mont Central College in Manhattan in 1858. Every year from 1857 to 1861, Goodnow spent several months in the East raising funds for the construction of Blue Mont Central College and Manhattan's Methodist church. The college building was finally constructed and opened for students in 1860.

Following Kansas's admission to the Union in 1861, Goodnow led a lobbying effort to have Blue Mont Central College converted to the state university. After failing in his efforts during the 1861 and 1862 legislative sessions, Goodnow ultimately succeeding in having the legislature convert Bluemont to Kansas State Agricultural College (later Kansas State University) in 1863 under the terms of the Morrill Land-Grant Colleges Act. While he was working on this issue, in 1861 Goodnow was also elected to the Kansas House of Representatives, and in the fall of 1862 Goodnow was elected state Superintendent of Public Instruction, a position to which he was re-elected in 1864.

In 1863, Goodnow helped found the Kansas State Teachers Association and served on the board of the National Education Association.

In 1867, Goodnow was selected agent for the sale of the 90,000 acres (364 km^{2}) of land granted by the federal government to Kansas State Agricultural College, a position he held until 1873. From 1869 to 1876, Goodnow was also land commissioner for the Missouri-Kansas-Texas Railroad.

== See also ==
- Goodnow House
