= Blue Mont Central College =

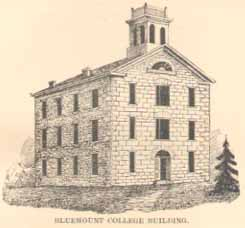
- Sketch of Blue Mont Central College
- Active: 1858–1863
- Affiliations: Methodist
- President: Isaac Goodnow
- Location: Manhattan, Kansas

Blue Mont Central College was a private, Methodist institute of higher learning located in Manhattan, Kansas, United States. The college was incorporated in February 1858, and was the forerunner of Kansas State University.

After Kansas became a U.S. state in 1861, the directors of Blue Mont Central College offered the school's three-story building and 120 acres (0.49 km^{2}) of its property to the State of Kansas to become the state's university. A bill accepting this offer easily passed the Kansas Legislature in 1861, but was controversially vetoed by Governor Charles L. Robinson of Lawrence, and an attempt to override the veto in the legislature failed by two votes. In 1862, another bill to accept the offer failed by one vote. Finally, on the third attempt, on February 16, 1863, the state enacted a law accepting the college building and grounds, and establishing the state's land-grant college at the site – the institution that would become Kansas State University. Blue Mont Central College ceased operations later that year after the school term was completed.

== History ==
The founding of the college was intertwined with the efforts of the New England Emigrant Aid Company to establish the town of Manhattan, Kansas, in 1855 as part of the effort to keep Kansas Territory from becoming a slave state.

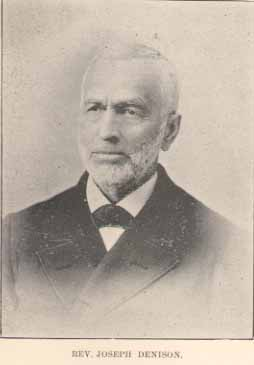
Joseph Denison, second President of Blue Mont Central College

The co-founder of the Emigrant Aid Company, Eli Thayer, wrote that the towns established by the Company should emphasize education: "to go with all our free-labor trophies: churches and schools, printing presses, steam-engines, and mills; and in a peaceful contest convince every poor man from the South of the superiority of free labor." Among the founders of Manhattan was Isaac Goodnow, a professor from Providence, Rhode Island. Goodnow led the New England Emigrant Aid Company's efforts to create a college in Manhattan.

The creation of Blue Mont Central College was formally proposed by Goodnow at a Methodist conference held in Nebraska City, Nebraska, in April 1857. The conference approved the creation of the school and appointed Goodnow and his brother-in-law Joseph Denison agents for the college.

The school was then chartered by an act of the Kansas Territorial legislature, signed by Territorial Governor James W. Denver on February 9, 1858—making it one of the first three institutes of higher education incorporated in Kansas Territory, all of which were incorporated on that date. It would take another two years, however, before the school was ready to open.

=== Operations ===
The cornerstone for the college's building was laid in a ceremony on May 10, 1859. The building was constructed of limestone, and was three stories tall when completed in late 1859. It contained eight classrooms, offices, a library and a grand hall on the third floor. The building was sufficiently complete for the first classes to begin on January 9, 1860.

The first class consisted of 29 students. The school was open to all denominations and was coeducational from its inception. Like many new colleges in frontier states, Blue Mont College began by offering only preparatory secondary school classes. Reportedly, no students were enrolled in college-level classes before the school ceased operations in 1863.

Goodnow was appointed the first President of the college and Instructor Washington Marlatt was appointed principal of the preparatory department for the college in 1860. Joseph Denison was appointed the second President of the college in 1863.

== Name ==
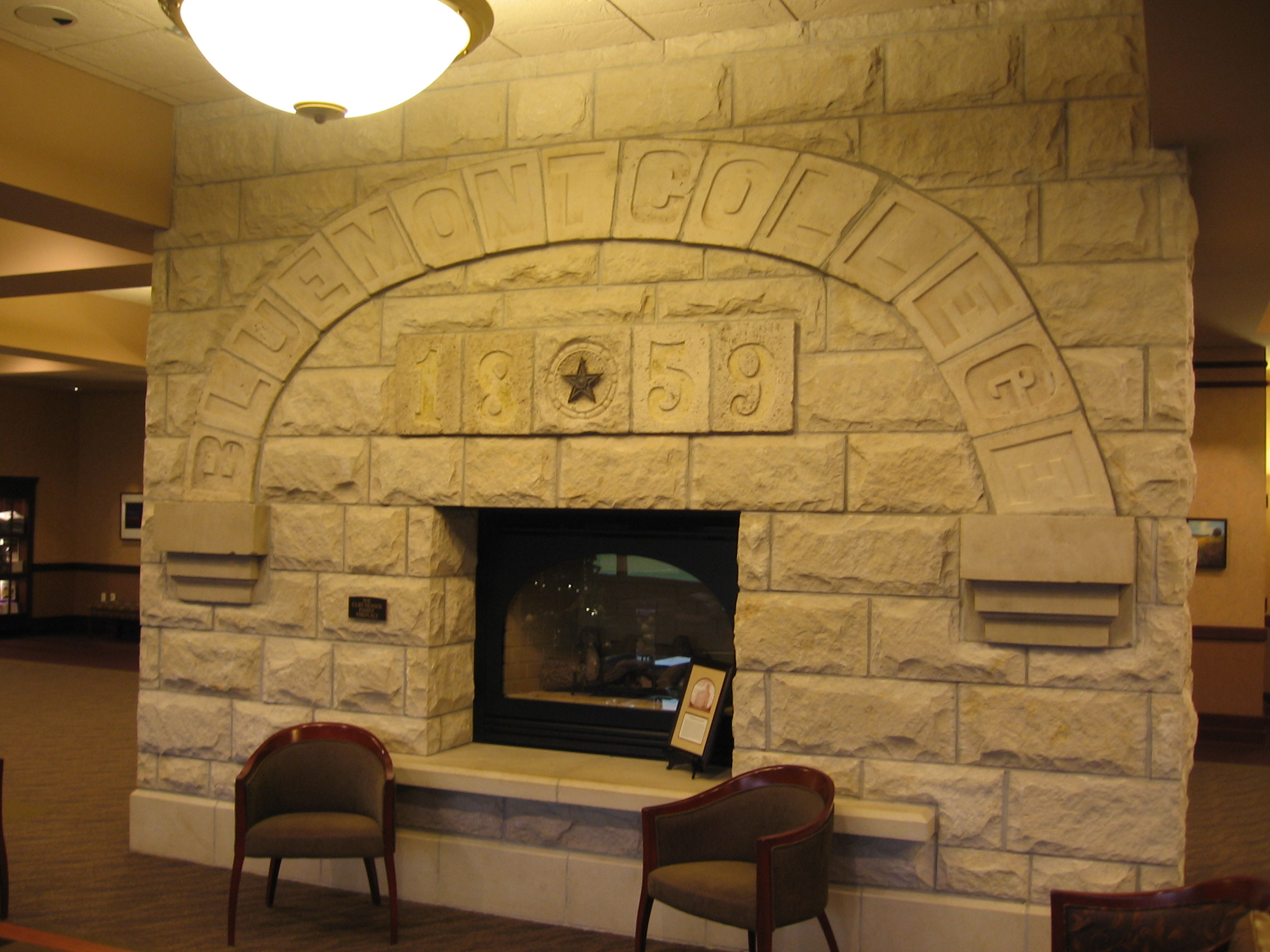
Arch from the Blue Mont College building, dated 1859, now at the KSU Alumni Center

The college was named after a prominent hill in Manhattan, Kansas. The name is sometimes written as "Bluemont" rather than "Blue Mont," but the articles of incorporation use two separate words. The term "Central" was included in the name because the founders believed Manhattan was located very near the geographic center of the United States as it existed in 1858.

== Legacy ==
Kansas State University moved from the location of old Blue Mont Central College in 1875, and the original college building was torn down in 1883. Nevertheless, Kansas State University has honored its legacy by naming a building on its present campus Bluemont Hall, by featuring an arch from the original Blue Mont Central College building over the central fireplace in the K-State Alumni Center, and by displaying the college's old bell on campus.
