= Kansas State Collegian =

Coordinates: 39°11′15.52″N 96°34′53.47″W

- Type: Student newspaper
- Format: Broadsheet
- Owner: Collegian Media Group
- Founded: 1896
- Headquarters: Manhattan, Kansas
- Circulation: 4,750
- OCLC number: 9453357
- Website: kstatecollegian.com

The Kansas State Collegian is the official daily student-run newspaper of Kansas State University. Founded in 1896, the Collegian has a circulation of 4,750. It is owned and published by Collegian Media Group.

== History ==
The inaugural edition of the student newspaper at K-State, then known as the Students' Herald, was published in 1896. The school became the first college or university in the United States to offer a four-year course in printing in 1910 with its industrial journalism curriculum.

During World War II, the paper was reduced from a broadsheet to a tabloid and was published once a week on the campus press. In 1946, the paper returned to its former size and was published on the presses of the Manhattan Mercury-Chronicle. The frequency and size of the paper changed again in 1949, when a Cox-O Type press was installed in the basement of Kedzie Hall and the Collegian went from a semi-weekly broadsheet to a daily tabloid-sized publication. In 1966, a 50,000 Cottrell web offset press was installed.

Collegian Media Group acquired the first computerized editing equipment in a Kansas newsroom and among the first four in a U.S. university in 1972, when Bill Brown, the director of the company, persuaded the board to purchase two Hendrix editing display terminals. An upgrade to punched tape typesetting equipment followed in 1982 with the installation of a Compugraphic Trendsetter. Another Trendsetter was added in 1983 and the Collegian changed to broadsheet format. Laser typesetting came to the paper in 1987, when an Apple LaserWriter Plus and Linotronic 100 replaced the Trendsetter presses. In 1992, under the direction of adviser Ron Johnson, the paper started evolving towards to full pagination in January, when Student Senate funded a half-million dollar purchase of Macintosh computer equipment.

The first Collegian website launched in 1994. Kelly Campbell and Ryan Korte, the Collegian network administrators, were among the original creators of the online version of the Collegian. The first "eCollegian" edition appeared in the summer, becoming only the third college newspaper to publish daily on the Web. The privilege fee continuation resulted in an upgrade of the Collegian's computers to PowerMacs, and printing services purchased a machine that allowed the pages to print straight to film, improving color and reproduction quality. The Electronic Collegian also won first place in content in the Associate Collegiate Press' Best of the Net competition in Washington, D.C.

In 1999, the Collegian accepted the bid of the Salina Journal to print the Collegian on its presses, allowing the Collegian to go four-color, five days a week, for the first time. The Collegian has since renewed its agreement with the Salina Journal. Meanwhile, the historic press machine in the basement of Kedzie was dismantled and removed. By the summer of 2006, the Collegian officially signs on and launches its updated Web site with the college newspaper hosting company, College Publisher. The Collegian continued pressing forward with its Web site, and by summer 2007, had begun hiring in-house staff members who focused on video editing. By July, the Collegian had also established an online e-mail subscription service, message board/forum system and interactive university calendar.
On July 9 the Collegian launched a redesigned Web site with College Publisher 5.0. The Collegian was one of the first College Publisher affiliates to launch a 5.0 Web site.

In the fall of 2012, the Collegian changed webpage platforms from College Publisher to Wordpress. This change came in unison with an overarching organizational name change from Student Publications, Inc., to Collegian Media Group. The Collegian's logo was changed from a graphic design of the text Kansas State Collegian to the collegian in lower case text with "independent voice for Kansas State University" as a sub-header in the logo. The logo also included a new insignia that is two apostrophes inside a circle forming a "C".

For most of its history, the Collegian published in print each weekday throughout the academic year, although by 2019 the Collegian had moved to a Monday, Wednesday, Friday only print edition. By 2024, this had been further reduced to a Friday-only print edition.

== Recent notable awards ==
- 2012: Society of Professional Journalists, Region 7 Mark of Excellence: Breaking News Reporting, First Place; General News Reporting, Third Place
- 2011: William Randolph Hearst Foundation Journalism Awards: Feature Writing, Fourth Place
- 2011: Society of Professional Journalists: Mark of Excellence Award
- 2011: Kansas Association of Broadcasters: Hard News Package, First Place
- 2010: Rolling Stone: College Journalist of the Year
- 2009: College Newspaper Business & Advertising Managers: Best Run Of Press Group Promotion
- 2008: Columbia Scholastic Press Association: Maps, First Place; Charts, First Place; Sports Feature Writing, First Place

== Notable alumni ==
Notable former staff members of the Collegian include:

- Dan Biles, Justice, Kansas Supreme Court
- Gail Gregg, Multi-media artist
- Pete Souza, Chief photographer, The White House
