= Westminster Presbyterian Church of Topeka =

Historic church in Kansas, United States

- Westminster Presbyterian Church
- U.S. National Register of Historic Places
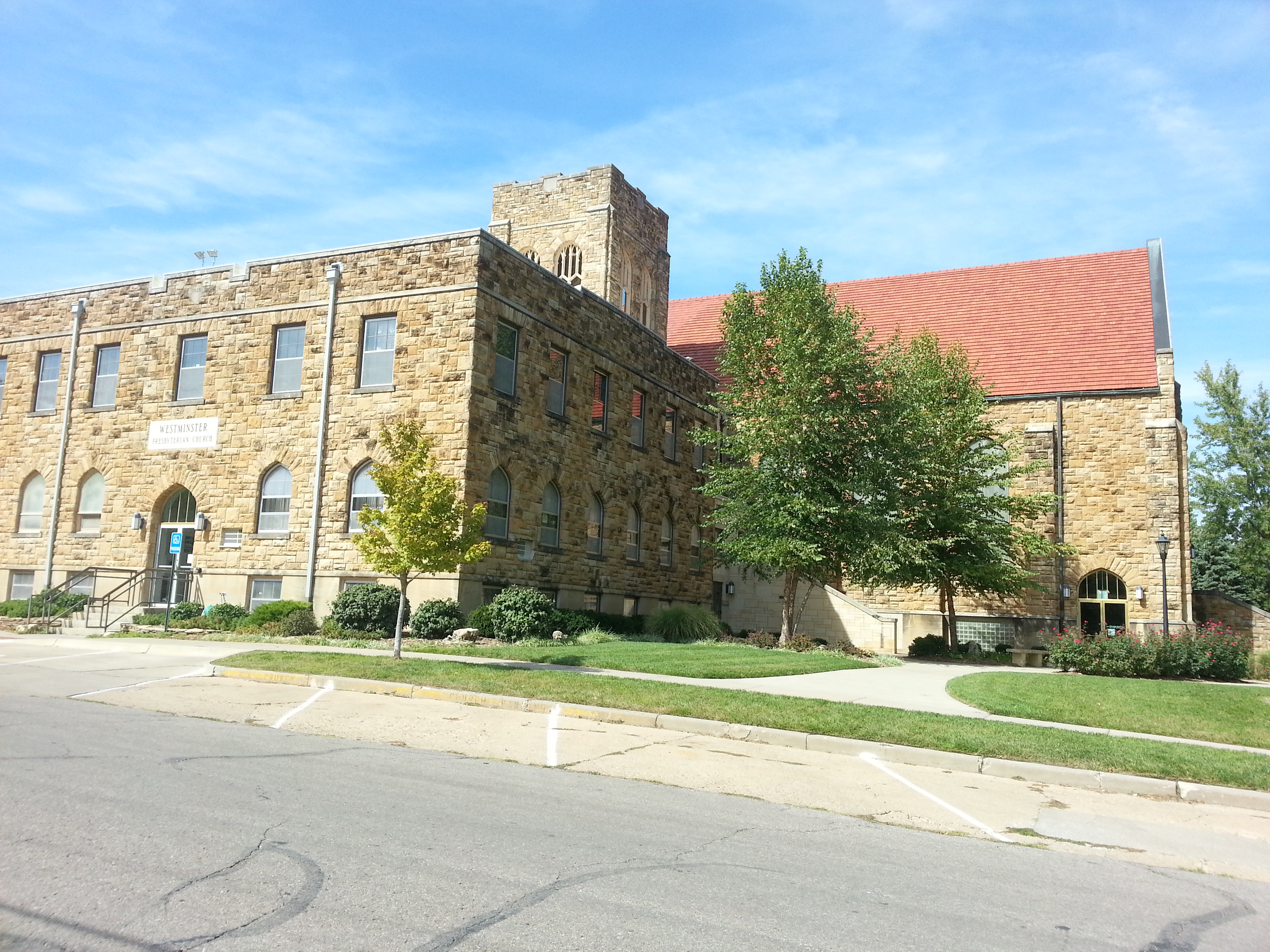

- Location within Kansas Location within the United States
- Location: 1275 Boswell Ave., Topeka, Kansas
- Coordinates: 39°2′37″N 95°42′8″W
- Area: 1.9 acres (0.77 ha)
- Built: 1926
- Architect: Cuthbert, Charles
- Architectural style: Late Gothic Revival
- NRHP reference No.: 04000453
- Added to NRHP: May 19, 2004

The Westminster Presbyterian Church in Topeka, Kansas was built during 1924 to 1926. It was designed by architect Charles Cuthbert in Late Gothic Revival architecture. It was listed on the National Register of Historic Places in 2004.

Its NRHP nomination describes: "As with most Late Gothic Revival structures, Westminster's design is quieter, smoother, less ornate and "top heavy" than that of the high Victorian Gothic period. There is little tracery and ornamentation is kept to a minimum."
