= Kansas State University Gardens =

Gardens in Manhattan, Kansas, United States

Coordinates: 39°11′42.79″N 96°35′5.9″W

- Interactive map of Kansas State University Gardens
- Website: Official website

The Kansas State University Gardens (19 acres) is a new horticulture display garden being developed and maintained by the Department of Horticulture, Forestry and Recreation Resources, Kansas State University. The gardens are located on campus at the intersection of Denison Avenue and Claflin Road, Manhattan, Kansas. The gardens are open to the public during daylight hours, March through November. No fee is charged.

Other attractions to the University Gardens include the insect zoo, the university conservatory which houses several cacti and tropical species. The university gardens is expected to grow over the next several years. Phase one is complete of the university gardens Phase two and three are expected to grow over the next several years with contributions and donations from university friends. Current plant collections included daylilies, irises and roses, as well as three specialty gardens: the Cottage, Insect Zoo and Native/Adaptive Plant Gardens. Peony and hosta collections are planned.

== See also ==
- List of botanical gardens in the United States
