= David Hicks Overmyer =

American painter

David Hicks Overmyer (April 5, 1889, Topeka, Kansas – March 26, 1973) was an artist active in the 20th century in Kansas. He is most notable for his murals. His first major commission was in the Kansas State Library building, started in 1934 as part of the Works Progress Administration. The murals which depict the disciplines of K-State at the time, include panels focusing on the concepts of "1) science and industry, 2) agricultural and animal husbandry 3) the arts [and] 4) the home." The preliminary studies for the mural are currently held by the Marianna Kistler Beach Museum of Art on the Kansas State University Manhattan Campus. In 1951, the Kansas Legislature commissioned Overmyer to paint the first floor of the Kansas State Capital building with eight images depicting Kansas history. The scenes are titled The Coming of the Spaniards, Battle of Arickaree, Battle of Mine Creek, Building a Sod House, Lewis and Clark in Kansas, Westward Ho, Arrival of the Railroad, and Chisholm Trail.

Overmyer married his wife née Grace McKinley Woodward (1894-1975) on May 21, 1921.

== Exhibitions ==
From February 5-May 22, 2011, the Mulvane Art Museum at Washburn University showed an exhibit of his works, profiling his role as a regional artist.
