= Ford Hall (Kansas State University) =

- Location within Kansas

General information
- Type: Residence Hall
- Architectural style: Standard white brick
- Location: Manhattan Ave. and Old Claflin Rd. Kansas State University, Manhattan, Kansas, United States
- Coordinates: 39°11′37.38″N 96°34′37.09″W
- Current tenants: 448 students
- Completed: 1966

Technical details
- Floor count: 9

Website
- www.k-state.edu

Ford Hall is an all-female residence hall at Kansas State University and is named for Kenney L. Ford who was Secretary of the Kansas State Alumni Association from 1928-1961. It is located on the South East corner of the Derby Complex at Kansas State's Manhattan, Kansas campus south of Haymaker Hall and east of West Hall on Manhattan Avenue and Old Claflin Road. It has a residence of approximately 450 students, and all rooms are suites. After the end of the Spring semester, all students move out and some return to live there another year, while others move on to live off-campus or at fraternities and sororities.

== Awards ==
=== 2000's ===
2000-2001

- Homecoming Winner (with Haymaker Hall and Smith Scholarship House) - Residence Hall Division

2003-2004

- Homecoming Winner (with Marlatt Hall and West Hall) - Residence Hall Division

2011-2012

- Homecoming Winner (with Moore Hall and Haymaker Hall (Kansas State University)) - Residence Hall Division

2011-2012

- Hall of the Year - Association of Residence Halls
