= Haymaker Hall =

General information
- Type: Residential Hall / Academic Building
- Architectural style: Limestone
- Location: Manhattan Ave. and Claflin Rd. Kansas State University; Manhattan, Kansas, United States
- Coordinates: 39°11′40.6″N 96°34′37.18″W
- Current tenants: 522 students
- Completed: 1966
- Cost: $1,308,128

Technical details
- Floor count: 9

Website
- www.k-state.edu/haymaker

Haymaker Hall is a co-ed residence hall at Kansas State University. It is located on the North-East corner of the Derby Complex at Kansas State's Manhattan, Kansas campus North of Ford Hall and East of Moore Hall on Manhattan Avenue and Claflin Road. It has a residence of approximately 525 students, and is renowned for its large concentration of agriculture and prehealth students. The fourth floor is the Agriculture Cluster study floor, while the seventh floor is the Pre-Health Cluster study floor. After the end of the Spring semester, all students move out; some return to live there another year, while others move on to live off-campus or at fraternities and sororities. It was a male only dorm from 1966 until the Fall of 2002.

== History ==
It was dedicated in honor of Mr. Henley. H. Haymaker

For many years Haymaker had been teamed up with Moore Hall until 2005, when West Hall switched to Haymaker.

Starting in the winter of the 04-05 school year, construction began on one of the Hall's wings. The renovation turned that wing into suite style rooms with bathrooms attached directly to the rooms.

The front desk is dedicated to Larry Rowland, Community Assistant who worked at the desk from the mid 1990s through 2004.
