= Royal Purple (yearbook) =

Official yearbook of Kansas State University

Coordinates: 39°11′16.81″N 96°34′53.51″W

The Royal Purple is the yearbook of Kansas State University. It has received multiple National Pacemaker Awards and was awarded a Silver Crown by the Columbia Scholastic Press Association in 2006.

The yearbook’s predecessor first appeared at Kansas State Agricultural College in 1891. Over the following years, the publication underwent several name changes, including: The Sledge, Sunrise, The Bell Clapper, and The Banner. The name The Royal Purple was adopted in 1909.

During the 20th century, The Royal Purple introduced several design and production features that were later adopted more widely in yearbook publishing. An embossed design on the division page, a feature that became common decades later, appeared in the 1939 edition.
