= Charles Cuthbert =

American architect

Charles D. Cuthbert was an architect in the U.S. state of Kansas. Several of his works are listed on the National Register of Historic Places.

== Family ==
His father was James Cuthbert, who was born in Scotland in 1849, and became a building contractor in Topeka, Kansas. Cuthbert & Sargent and Cuthbert & Sons are firm names which involved James and/or sons George M. (carpenter), William F. (carpenter), James R. (stone mason), John R. (bricklayer) and Charles D. (architect).

== Career ==
Cuthbert studied at the School of Architecture (now Sam Fox School of Design & Visual Arts) at Washington University in St. Louis. He became State Architect of Kansas in 1925. He practiced alone and later was joined in partnership Cuthbert & Suehrk by Williem E. Suehrk, a classmate from architectural school.

== Notable works ==
Works by the father's contracting firm include:

- Rice County Courthouse, 101 W. Commercial St., Lyons, KS, (Cuthbert and Son), NRHP-listed
- Rooks County Courthouse, 115 N. Walnut St., Stockton, KS, (Cuthbert and Sons), NRHP-listed
- Washburn University Carnegie Library Building, Off Seventeenth St. and Washburn Ave., Topeka, KS (Cuthbert, James, & Sargent), NRHP-listed

Works by Charles Cuthbert (individual or shared attribution) include:

- East Topeka Junior High School, 1210 E. 8th St., Topeka, KS Cuthbert & Suehrk, NRHP-listed
- Gem Building, 506-510 SW 10th Ave., Topeka, KS, (Cuthbert, Charles D.), NRHP-listed
- Westminster Presbyterian Church, 1275 Boswell Ave. Topeka, KS (Cuthbert, Charles), NRHP-listed
- Laboratory School, Kansas State Teachers College
- Beach Music School, at Emporia State University, formerly known as the Kansas State Teachers College, Fr
- Snow Hall and Hoch Auditorium (later renamed Budig Hall), University of Kansas campus (Cuthbert & Suehrk)
