= Moore Hall (Kansas State University) =

- Location within Kansas

General information
- Type: Residential Hall / Academic Building
- Architectural style: Standard limestone brick
- Location: Kansas State University, Manhattan, Kansas, United States
- Coordinates: 39°11′40.94″N 96°34′41.69″W
- Current tenants: 633 students
- Completed: 1966

Technical details
- Floor count: 9 & Basement

Website
- www.k-state.edu

Moore Hall is a co-ed residence hall at Kansas State University, Kansas, United States. It is located on the East side of Kansas State's Manhattan, Kansas campus in the North-West corner of the Derby Complex, north of West Hall and west of Haymaker Hall. It is known for its Leadership Studies and Business cluster floors. After the end of the Spring semester, students typically move out of the halls, but Moore provides residency for year-round students along with Haymaker Hall. Some return to live there another year while others move on to live off-campus or in fraternities and sororities.

== History ==
The building opened in 1967, named after Helen Moore. Moore was Dean of Women at Kansas State University from 1940 until 1957, when she retired as an administrator but remained active on the Kansas State faculty as a professor of mathematics. She died on February 8, 1963.
