= Seaton Hall =

Academic Building in Kansas, United States

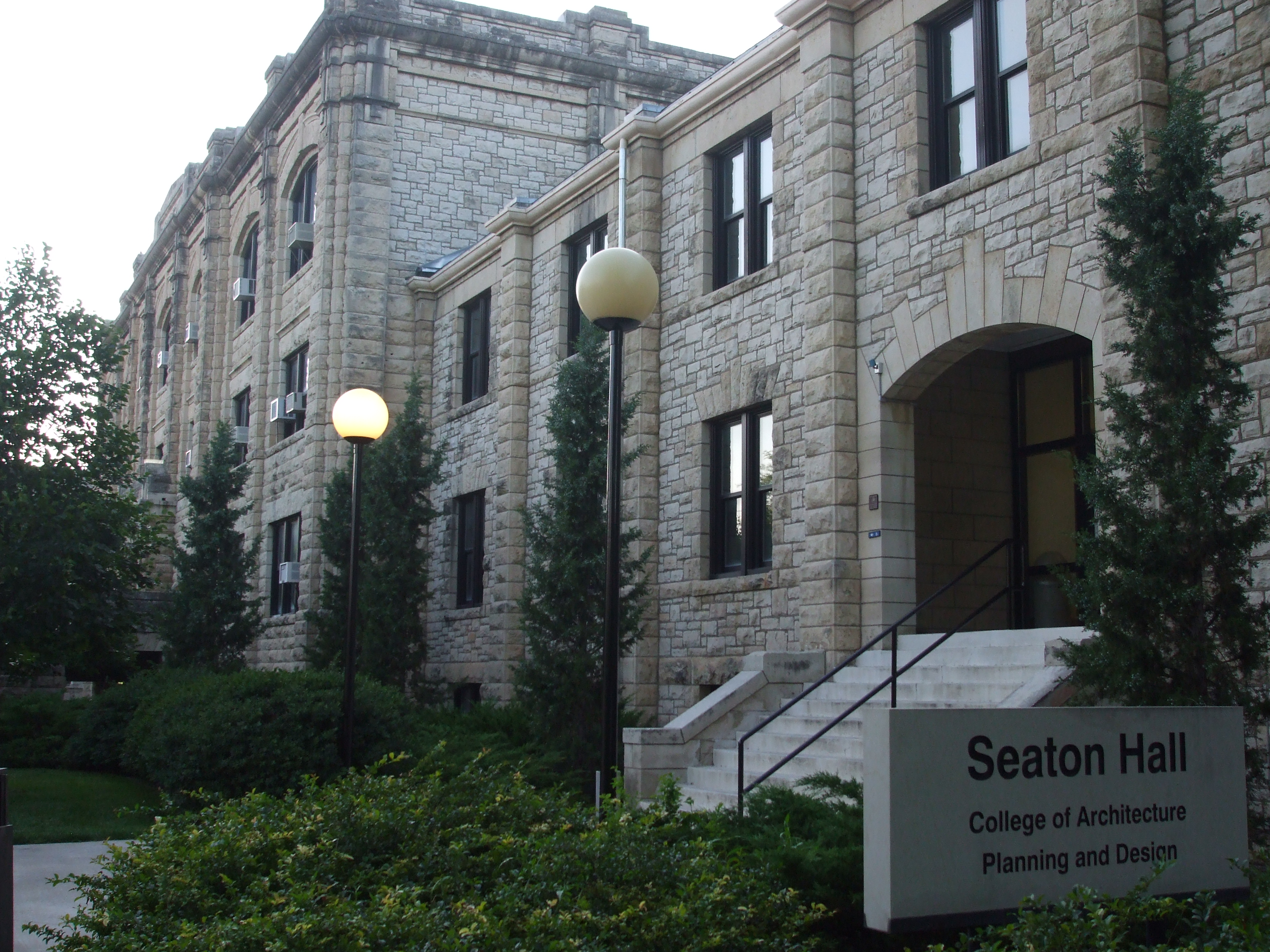
- Interactive map of the Seaton Hall area
- Former names: (mechanics hall, mechanical engineering hall, mechanics arts bldg, engineering bldg)
- Alternative names: 1955 Named for Dr. Roy A. Seaton (Class of 1904; Dean, Engineering and Architecture, 1920-1949)

General information
- Type: Residential Hall / Academic Building
- Architectural style: Neo-Renaissance
- Location: Kansas State University, Manhattan, Kansas, United States
- Coordinates: 39°11′23″N 96°34′57″W
- Current tenants: College of Architecture, Planning, and Design; Department of Architectural Engineering and Construction Science (College of Engineering); Department of Geography
- Completed: 1908 South wing 1921 Center & West wing completed 1953 West wing expansion 1959 (North Wing)
- Renovated: 2000 (East Wing) 2002 West wing renovation named (Lee Wing) for Robert V. and Mildred E. Lee

Technical details
- Floor count: 3 and basement

Website
- www.k-state.edu

Seaton Hall and Seaton Court are the names of two parts of one sprawling building on the campus of Kansas State University. The building is set just north of the Student Union and Bosco Plaza.

== Renovations ==
In 1999 the East wing underwent major renovations as part of a three-phase project. The architecture and planning firm Ebert Mayo Design Group was responsible for the plans. This phase cost $4.1 million and includes:

- 22 Design Studios
- 4 Classrooms
- 4 Critique Rooms
- Atrium/Display Gallery
- Technology Infrastructure
- New environmental systems

== Sources ==
- Information and History of Seaton Hall and Kansas State University
- Current news of what is happening in the College
- The Ebert Mayo Design Group site with images of plans and finished construction
- K-State Department of Facilities Planning Archives
