= Kansas State University =

Public university in Manhattan, Kansas, US

- Former names: Kansas State Agricultural College (1863–1931); Kansas State College of Agriculture and Applied Science (1931–1959)
- Motto: "Rule by Obeying Nature's Laws"
- Type: Public land-grant research university
- Established: February 16, 1863; 163 years ago
- Parent institution: Kansas Board of Regents
- Accreditation: HLC
- Academic affiliations: ASAIHL; URA; Space-grant
- Endowment: $902.2 million (FY2025)
- Budget: $1.09 billion (FY2026)
- President: Richard Linton
- Provost: Jesse Perez Mendez
- Academic staff: 1,247 (fall 2025)
- Total staff: 4,590 (fall 2025)
- Students: 21,213 (fall 2025)
- Undergraduates: 16,555 (fall 2025)
- Postgraduates: 4,658 (fall 2025)
- Location: Manhattan, Kansas, United States; 39.1914°N 96.5809°W
- Campus: 668 acres (2.70 km^{2}); Small city
- Other campuses: Salina; Olathe
- Newspaper: Kansas State Collegian
- Colors: Royal Purple
- Nickname: Wildcats
- Sporting affiliations: NCAA Division I FBS – Big 12
- Mascot: Willie the Wildcat
- Website: www.k-state.edu

Kansas State University (KSU, Kansas State, or K-State) is a public land-grant research university with its main campus in Manhattan, Kansas, United States. It was opened as the state's land-grant college in 1863 and was the first public institution of higher learning in the state of Kansas. It is governed by the Kansas Board of Regents.

The university is classified among "R1: Doctoral Universities – Very high research activity". Kansas State's academic offerings are administered through nine colleges, including the College of Veterinary Medicine and the College of Technology and Aviation in Salina. Graduate degrees offered include 65 master's degree programs and 45 doctoral degrees.

Branch campuses are in Salina and Olathe. The Kansas State University Salina Aerospace and Technology Campus is home to the College of Technology and Aviation. The Olathe Innovation Campus has a focus on graduate work in research bioenergy, animal health, plant science and food safety and security.

== History ==
Kansas State University, originally named Kansas State Agricultural College, was founded in Manhattan on February 16, 1863, during the American Civil War, as a land-grant institution under the Morrill Act. The state legislature established the state's land-grant college in Manhattan on January 13, 1863. A commission to establish a state university in Lawrence was called for later in the same legislative session, provided that town could meet certain requirements, and finalized later that year. Kansas State was the first public institution of higher learning founded in the state and began teaching college-level classes in 1863. By comparison, the University of Kansas opened in 1866, and offered only preparatory-level classes until college-level classes began in 1869. The school was the first land-grant college created under the Morrill Act. K-State is the third-oldest school in the Big 12 Conference and the oldest public institution of higher learning in the state of Kansas.

The effort to establish the school began in 1861, the year that Kansas was admitted to the United States. One of the new state legislature's top priorities involved establishing a state university. That year, the delegation from Manhattan, led by New England abolitionist, Isaac Goodnow, introduced a bill to convert the private Blue Mont Central College in Manhattan, incorporated in 1858, into the state university. But the bill establishing the university in Manhattan was controversially vetoed by Governor Charles L. Robinson of Lawrence, and an attempt to override the veto in the Legislature failed by two votes. In 1862, another bill to make Manhattan the site of the state university failed by one vote. Finally, upon the third attempt on February 16, 1863, the state accepted Manhattan's offer to donate the Blue Mont College building and grounds and established the state's land-grant college at the site – the institution that would become Kansas State University.

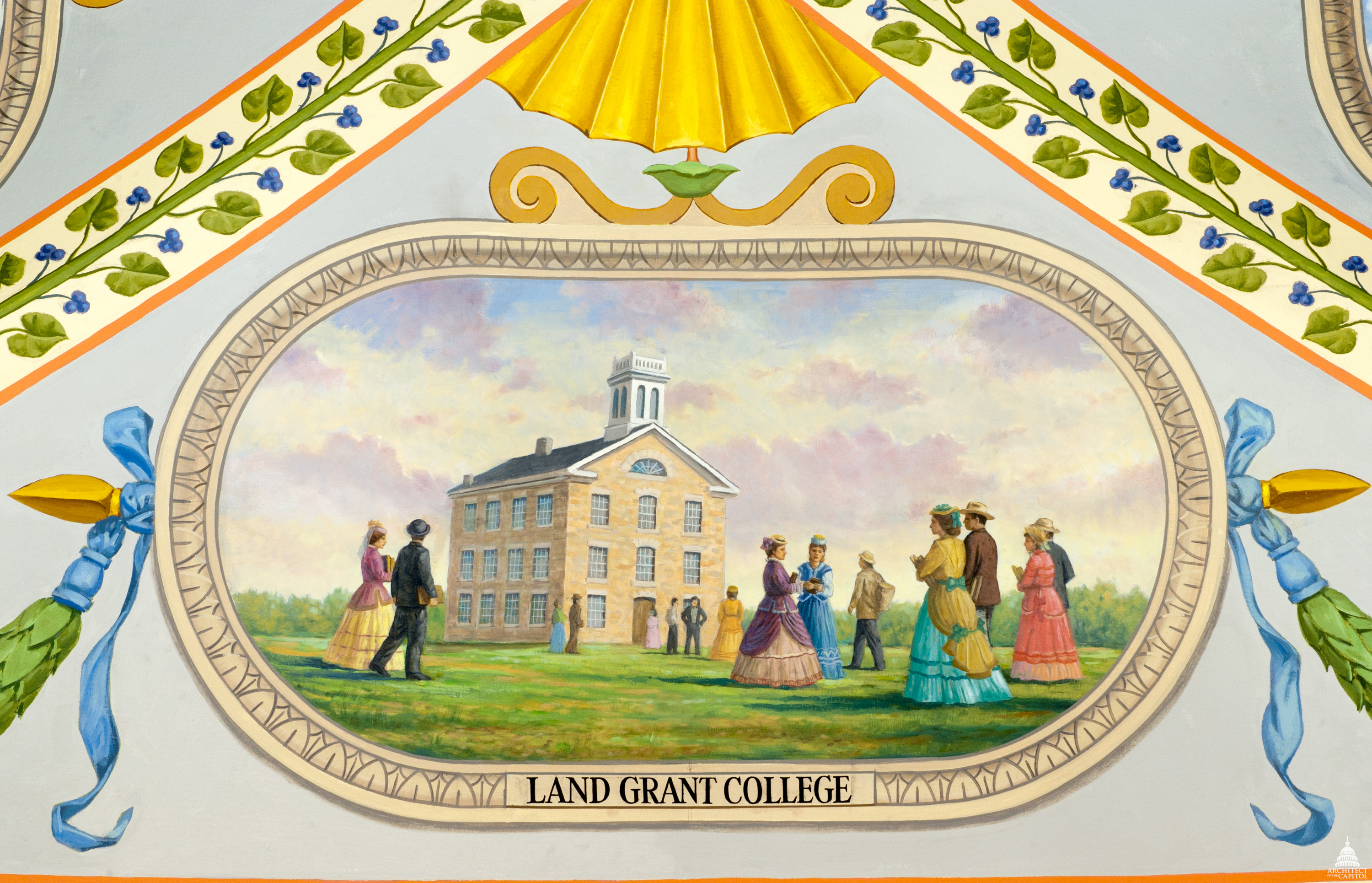
The college c. 1860s, from a mural at the U.S. Capitol

When the college opened for its first session on September 2, 1863, it became only the second public institution of higher learning to admit women and men equally in the United States. Enrollment for the first session totaled 52 students: 26 men and 26 women. Twelve years after opening, the university moved its main campus from the location of Blue Mont Central College to its present site in 1875. The original site is now occupied by Central National Bank of Manhattan and Founders Hill Apartments.

The early years of the institution witnessed debate over whether the college should provide a focused agricultural education or a full liberal arts education. During this era, the tenor of the school shifted with the tenure of college presidents. For example, President John A. Anderson (1873–1879) favored a limited education and President George T. Fairchild (1879–1897) favored a classic liberal education. Fairchild was credited with saying, "Our college exists not so much to make men farmers as to make farmers men."

During this era, in 1873, Kansas State helped pioneer the academic teaching of home economics for women, becoming one of the first two colleges to offer the program of study.

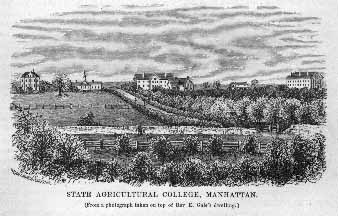
The college in 1878, three years after moving to its current location

In November 1928, the school was accredited by the Association of American Universities (AAU) as a school whose graduates were deemed capable of advanced graduate work. The name of the school was changed in 1931 to Kansas State College of Agriculture and Applied Science. In 1959, the Kansas legislature changed the name again to Kansas State University of Agriculture and Applied Science to reflect a growing number of graduate programs. However, in modern practice, the "Agriculture and Applied Science" portion has usually been omitted even from official documents such as state statutes.

Milton S. Eisenhower was president from 1943 to 1950. Eisenhower was a leading UNESCO delegate and served as the first chairman of the U.S. National Commission for UNESCO. Influenced by his work with UNESCO, he pursued a number of progressive reforms at Kansas State College to promote democracy, citizenship, and global peacebuilding. These curricular reforms led to a subsequent peace-building movement on the campus that agitated for civic participation, humanitarian action, and desegregation from 1947 to 1950.

On June 15, 2009, Kirk Schulz became the 13th president of Kansas State University. In March 2010 he announced his K-State 2025 plan. The initiative is designed to elevate K-State to a top 50 nationally recognized research university by 2025. In 2011, during Schulz's tenure, the Olathe branch opened. His last day was April 22, 2016, as he was selected as Washington State University's next president.

In late April 2016, Ret. General Richard Myers began serving as the interim president of Kansas State University and was announced as the permanent 14th president on November 15, 2016. He was succeeded by Richard Linton, a former dean of the College of Agriculture and Life Science at North Carolina State University (2012–2022).

== Campus ==
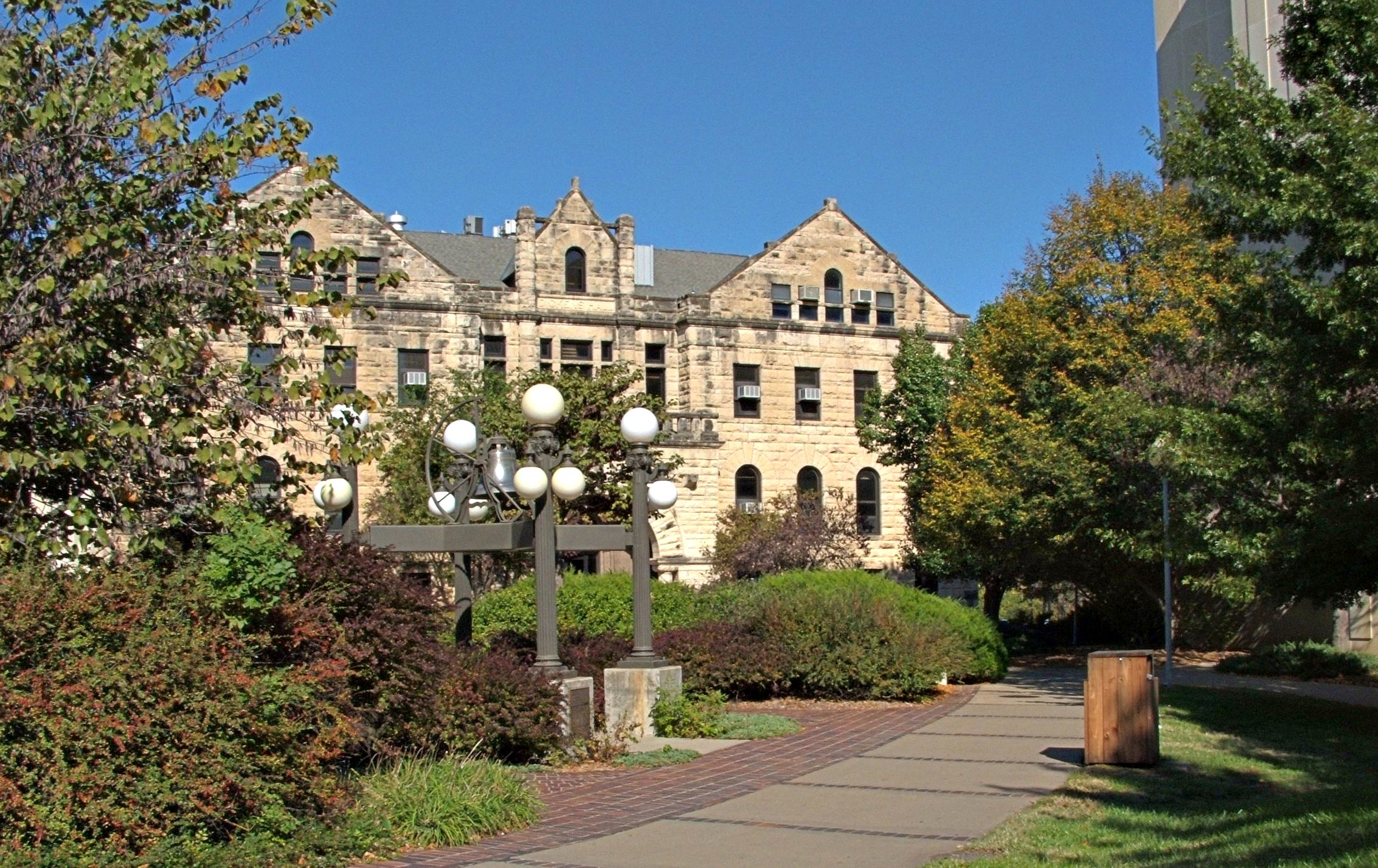
Bluemont Bell and Dickens Hall

The main campus of Kansas State University in Manhattan now covers 668 acres (2.70 km^{2}). The campus is historic, featuring more buildings built before 1910 than any other campus in Kansas. Holtz Hall, built in 1876, is the oldest free-standing building on campus. However, the oldest building on campus is the original section of Seaton Hall, which now forms Seaton Court, facing the courtyard of Hale Library and Eisenhower Hall. Originally named the Industrial Workshop, this section of Seaton Hall is the oldest remaining education building on the Manhattan campus.

The predominant architectural feature of the Manhattan campus is its use of native limestone. This includes the signature building at Kansas State University, Anderson Hall, developed in three stages between 1877 and 1885. Anderson Hall, now listed on the National Register of Historic Places, has housed the university's administrative offices for more than a century. Dickens Hall was constructed in 1908 and currently houses the statistics and philosophy departments. Although there are many historic building on the campus, since 1986 Kansas State has also added over two million square feet (186,000 m^{2}) of new buildings to the campus, including an expanded library, new art museum, and plant sciences building.

Several of the buildings on campus were heavily damaged by an EF4 tornado on June 11, 2008. Damage estimates totaled more than $20 million.

Since 2014, the Main campus has been under significant renovation to accommodate infrastructure changes. The campus is also adopting a more walking friendly atmosphere by closing off many small access roads to vehicles.

== Academics ==
Academic rankings

National
- Forbes: 213
- U.S. News & World Report: 158 (tie)
- Washington Monthly: 484
- WSJ/College Pulse: 253

Global
- ARWU: 601–700
- QS: 901-950
- THE: 601–800
- U.S. News & World Report: 696 (tie)

Since 1986, Kansas State ranks first nationally among public universities in its total of Rhodes, Marshall, Truman, Goldwater, and Udall scholars with 147 recipients. The school is a member of the Midwestern Association of Graduate Schools, and is home to the Kansas Beta chapter of the Phi Beta Kappa honor society. The institution petitioned in 1925, and three years later received, a charter of Mortar Board National College Senior Honor Society.

Kansas State University has 65 academic departments in nine colleges: Agriculture; Architecture, Planning and Design; Arts and Sciences; Business Administration; Education; Engineering; Health and Human Sciences; Technology and Aviation; and Veterinary Medicine. The graduate school offers 65 master's degree programs and nearly 50 doctoral programs.

In 1991, the former Kansas Technical Institute in Salina, Kansas was merged with Kansas State University by an act of the Kansas legislature. The College of Technology and Aviation is at the Salina campus. Initially, this campus was referred to as Kansas State University – Salina, but on October 14, 2014, the Kansas Board of Regents approved a name change to Kansas State University Polytechnic Campus. The campus was again renamed in 2021 to Kansas State University Salina Aerospace and Technology Campus.

In 2018, the Kansas Board of Regents approved that the name of the College of Engineering should be changed to the Carl R. Ice College of Engineering in Ice's honor.

== Research ==
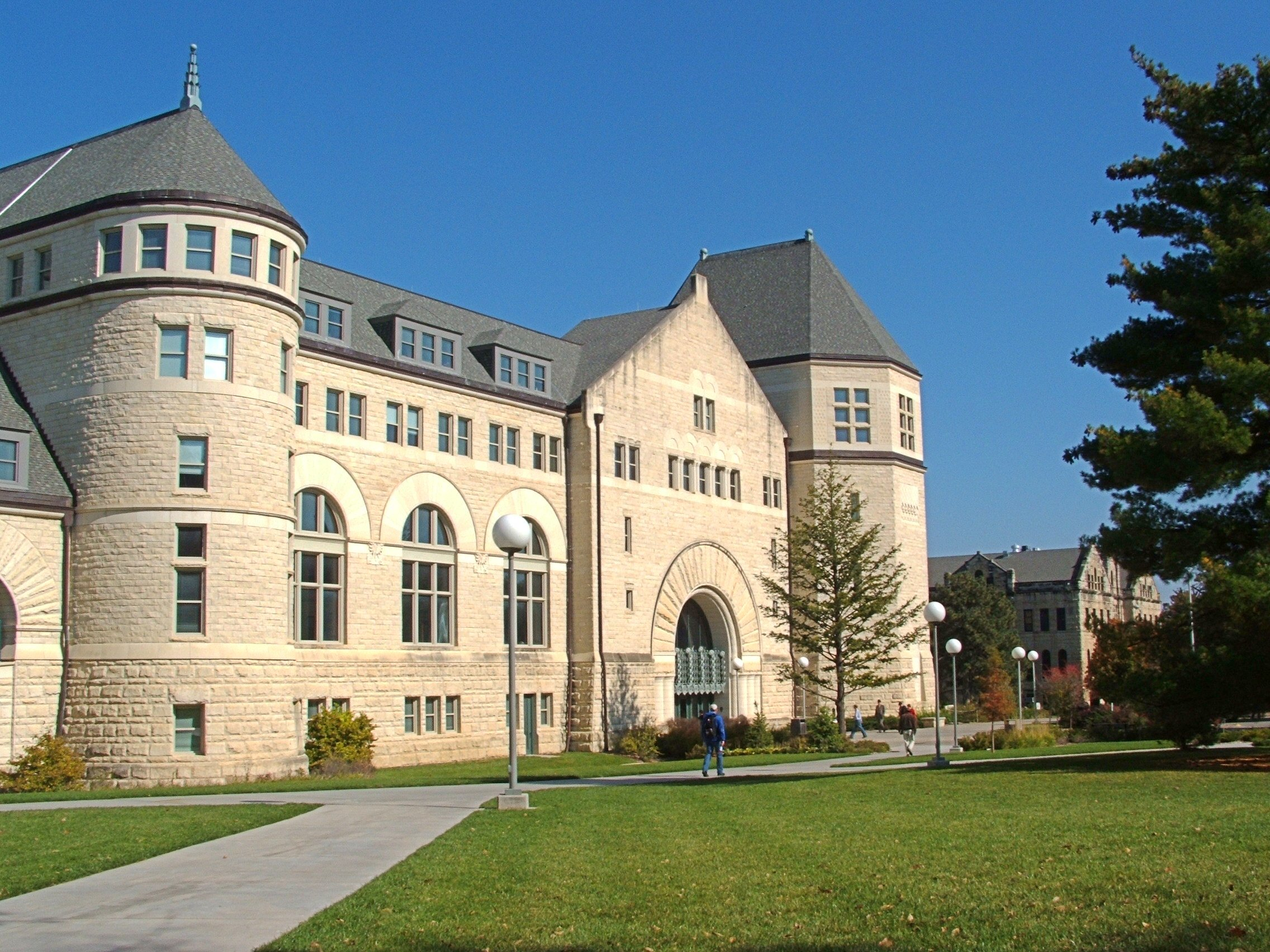
Hale Library

=== Agriculture ===
The university has had a long-standing interest in agriculture, particularly native Great Plains plant and animal life. The Kansas State University Gardens is an on-campus horticulture display garden that serves as an educational resource and learning laboratory for K-State students and the public. The Konza Prairie is a native tallgrass prairie preserve south of Manhattan, which is co-owned by The Nature Conservancy and Kansas State University and operated as a field research station by the department of biology. The university also owns an additional 18,000 acres (73 km^{2}) in cities across the state that it operates as Agricultural Experiment Stations in research centers in Hays, Garden City, Colby, and Parsons.

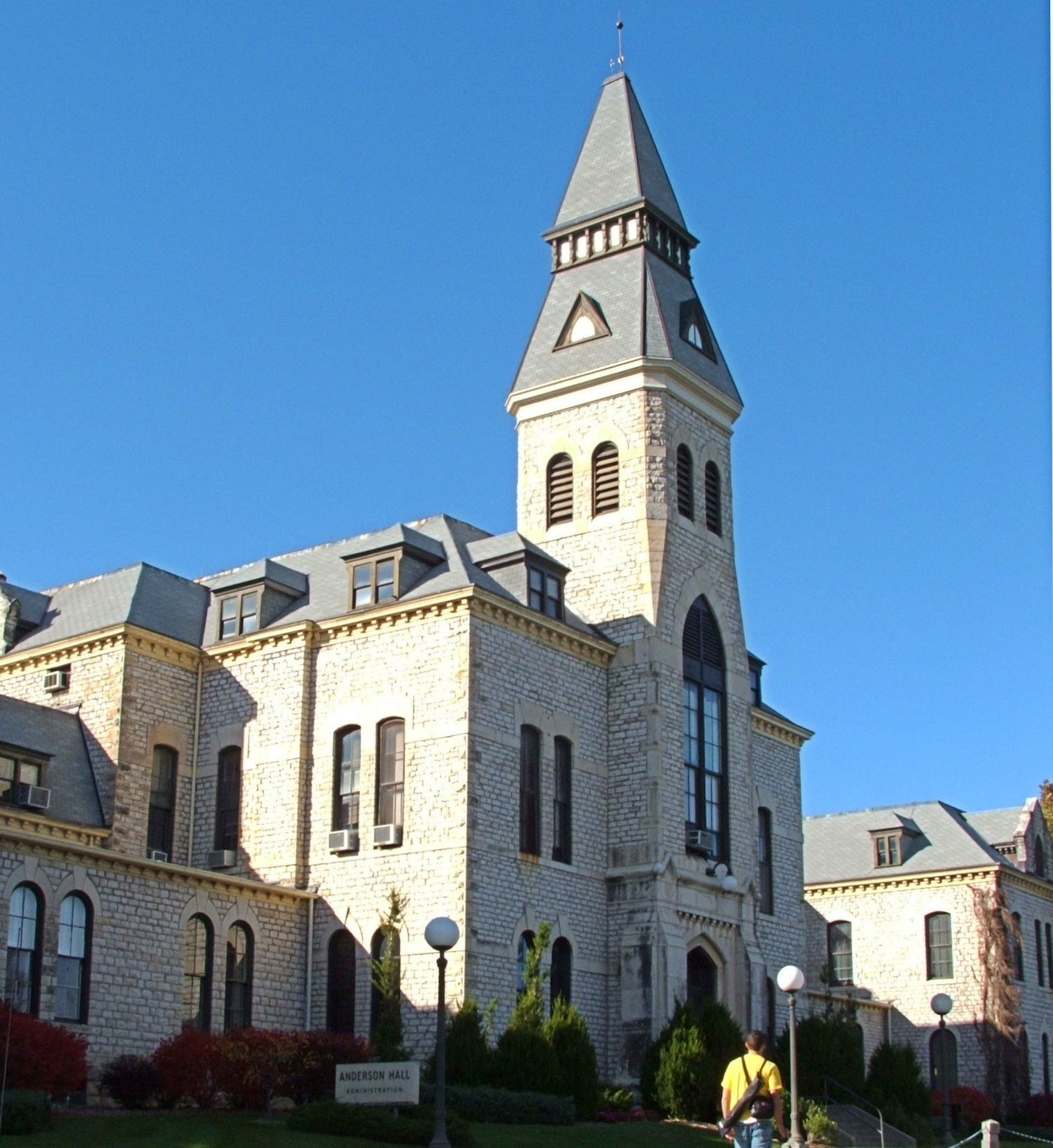
Anderson Hall

In 2006, K-State dedicated the Biosecurity Research Institute. The BRI, in Pat Roberts Hall, is a safe and secure location in which scientists and their collaborators can study high-consequence pathogens. It was designed and constructed for biosafety level 3 (BSL-3) and biosafety level 3 agriculture (BSL-3Ag) research.

The university's research facilities include the James R. Macdonald Laboratory for research in atomic, molecular and optical physics and the NASA Center for Gravitational Studies in Cellular and Developmental Biology. The excimer laser, which made LASIK eye surgery possible, is a technology developed by Kansas State researchers.

=== Radio & television ===
Kansas State was involved in early experimentation with television and radio broadcasts. The first radio station licensed in Manhattan was Kansas State's experimental station 9YV. In 1912 the station began a daily broadcast (in morse code) of the weather forecast, becoming the first radio station in the U.S. to air a regularly scheduled forecast. After a series of efforts to secure a more high-powered signal for the university – including a brief cooperation with John R. Brinkley's notorious KFKB – Kansas State was granted a license for KSAC, which began broadcasting with 500 watts of power on December 1, 1924. The station was reassigned to the frequency of AM 580 in 1928, and continued broadcasting on that frequency until November 27, 2002, when it made its last broadcast after the frequency was bought out by WIBW in Topeka, Kansas.

On March 9, 1932, the Federal Radio Commission granted Kansas State a license to operate the television station W9XAK. It was the first television station in Kansas. Activity on the station peaked in 1933 and 1934, with original programs being produced three nights a week. On October 28, 1939, the station broadcast the Homecoming football game in Manhattan between Kansas State and Nebraska, which was the second college football game ever televised. The station went off the air in 1939.

=== K-State Research Exchange ===
K-State Research Exchange, referred to as K-REx, is a local branding of Kansas State University's implementation of DSpace.

Kansas State University graduate students are required to submit an electronic version of their thesis, dissertation, or report, which is then made openly available through the K-State Research Exchange (K-REx), and become indexed by search engines.

== Campus life ==
Undergraduate demographics as of Fall 2023
Race and ethnicity	Total
White	80%
Hispanic	9%
Two or more races	4%
Black	3%
Asian	2%
International student	2%
Unknown	1%
Economic diversity
Low-income (Note: The percentage of students who received an income-based federal Pell Grant intended for low-income students.)	20%
Affluent (Note: The percentage of students who are a part of the American middle class at the bare minimum.)	80%

The university is home to several museums, including the Marianna Kistler Beach Museum of Art, the KSU Historic Costume and Textiles Museum, the K-State Insect Zoo, and the Chang, Chapman, and Kemper galleries, which feature faculty and student artwork. The university also offers an annual cycle of performance art at McCain Auditorium, including concerts, plays and dance.

The former All-University Convocation lecture series – which began with a speech by Harry Golden on April 3, 1963, and ended in 1997 – brought to campus prominent leaders such as Martin Luther King Jr., Supreme Court Justices Byron White and William O. Douglas, Senate Minority Leader Everett Dirksen, Rep. Shirley Chisholm, and thinkers such as Arthur C. Clarke, Benjamin Spock, Betty Friedan, Buckminster Fuller, and Saul Alinsky.

=== Student life ===
K-State has twelve residence halls on campus: Boyd Hall, Ford Hall, Goodnow Hall, Haymaker Hall, Marlatt Hall, Moore Hall, West Hall, Putnam Hall, Van Zile Hall, and the new Wefald hall, completed in 2016. The Living Community at Jardine, and Smurthwaite, as well as Jardine Apartments. Smurthwaite, Ford, and Boyd Halls are all female. Haymaker and Marlatt Halls were all-male residence halls until the fall semesters of 2002 and 2009 respectively, when they became co-educational. The residence halls are divided into three complexes: Derby, Kramer, and Strong.

K-State implemented an academic honor code in 1999. When students are admitted, it is implied that they will adhere to the Honor Pledge: "On my honor, as a student, I have neither given nor received unauthorized aid on this academic work."

Kansas State has more than 400 student organizations.

Student media include KSDB-FM "Wildcat 91.9", KKSU-LD "Channel 8", the Kansas State Collegian, and the Royal Purple Yearbook.

Alma Mater is the name of the official school song of Kansas State University. In 1888, when the university was still Kansas State Agricultural College, H.W. Jones submitted the song as part of a school-wide contest. It was originally a four-stanza song and, over the years, some lyrics have changed. The song is sung at most K-State sporting events by fans, students and alumni. Wildcat Victory and Wabash Cannonball are both commonly used as fight songs. Wildcat Victory is used by many high schools as their fight song. Since the late 2010s, K-State students have chanted obscenities at sporting events toward their rival, the University of Kansas, to Darude's Sandstorm and the Wabash Cannonball. This tradition has continued despite the efforts of football coach Bill Snyder, basketball coach Jerome Tang, and band director Frank Tracz.

==== Fraternities and sororities ====
There are dozens of national and international fraternities and sororities at Kansas State University.

== Athletics ==
Kansas State Athletics wordmark

Intercollegiate sports began at Kansas State in the 1890s. The school's sports teams are called the Wildcats, and they participate in the NCAA Division I and the Big 12 Conference. The official school color is Royal Purple, making Kansas State one of very few schools (alongside Syracuse and Harvard) that have only one official color. White and silver are commonly used as complementary colors; white is mentioned with purple in the university's fight song "Wildcat Victory". The athletics logo is a stylized Wildcat head in profile usually featured in the school color, called the "Powercat".

Sports sponsored by the school include football, basketball, cross country and track, baseball, golf, tennis, rowing, women's soccer, and volleyball. In 2012−2013, Kansas State became only the second Big 12 school to win conference titles in football, men's basketball, and baseball in the same school year.

Historically, African-American athletes at Kansas State were responsible for breaking the modern "color barrier" in Big Seven Conference athletics. Harold Robinson became the first African-American athlete in the conference in more than two decades and the first ever to receive a scholarship, playing football for Kansas State in 1949. In the spring of 1951 the conference's baseball color barrier was broken by Kansas State's Earl Woods, and in the winter of 1951–1952 Kansas State's Gene Wilson broke the conference color barrier in basketball (together with LaVannes Squires at the University of Kansas).

== Notable people ==
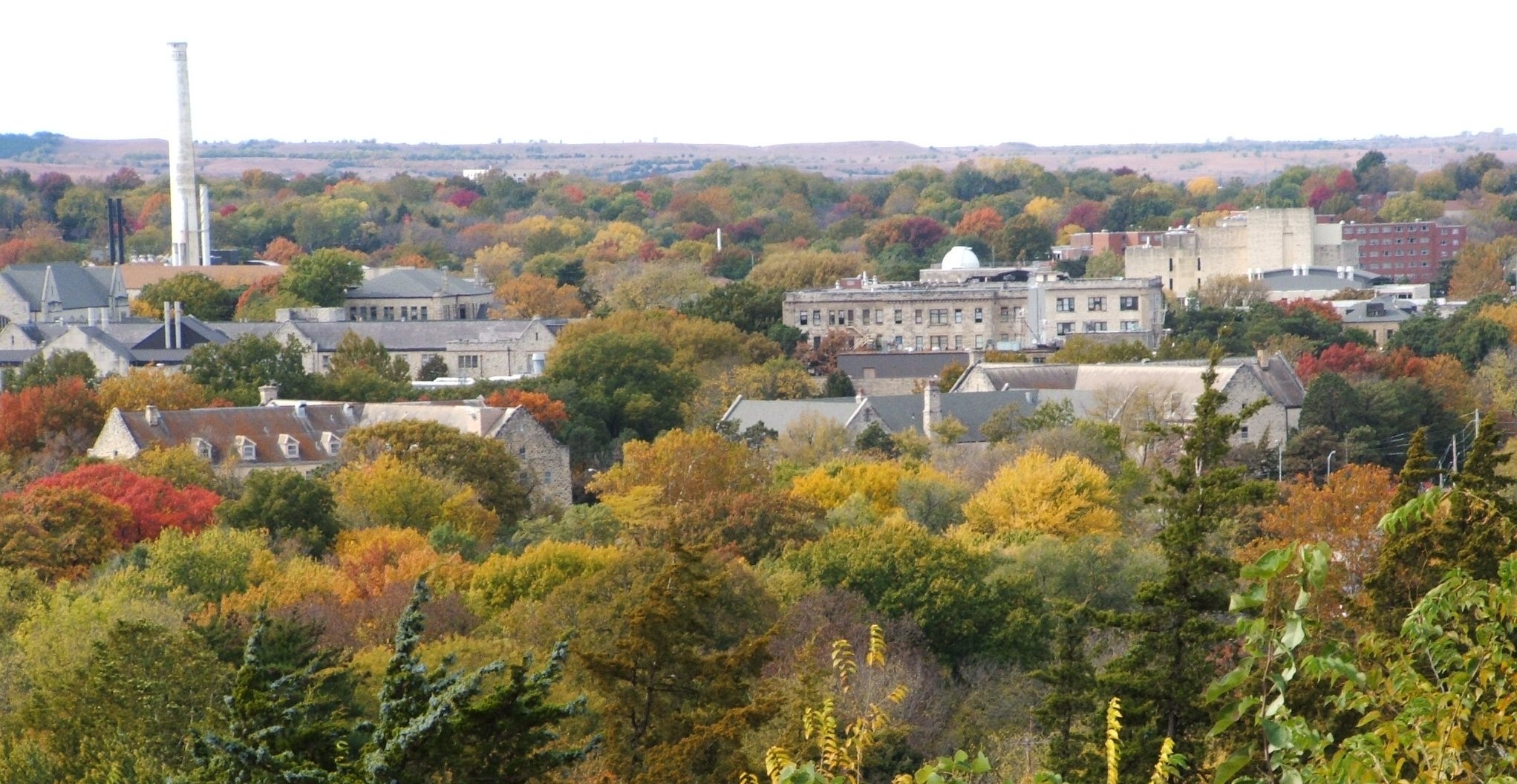
Northern Campus in October

=== Alumni ===
Beginning with the first graduating class in 1867, a number of Kansas State alumni have gone on to distinguished careers. NASA Armstrong Flight Research Center director De E. Beeler, the 46th Governor of Kansas, Sam Brownback, and two U.S. Senators from Kansas, Pat Roberts and Roger Marshall, are graduates of Kansas State University. Other graduates currently serve as the president of the Georgia Institute of Technology, and the president of the University of the Virgin Islands. Kansas State alumni have been enshrined in the Rock and Roll Hall of Fame and the College Football Hall of Fame, served as Chairman of the Joint Chiefs of Staff, and have earned Emmy Awards and Olympic gold medals. Geraldine L. Richmond, the National Medal of Science laureate (2013) and Priestley Medalist (2018), received a B.S. in chemistry in 1975.

=== Faculty ===
In line with its roots as a land grant college, a number of Kansas State's most eminent faculty in its earliest years were in the areas of agriculture, science and military. For example, geologist Benjamin Franklin Mudge was chair of the geology department while Army officer Andrew Summers Rowan, the subject of the essay A Message to Garcia, served as professor of military tactics.

Fred Albert Shannon was awarded the Pulitzer Prize for History in 1929, while teaching history at Kansas State. In 2008, CASE and the Carnegie Foundation for the Advancement of Teaching honored Michael Wesch as national Professor of the Year. At least eight Kansas State faculty members have gone on to serve as university presidents, including Naomi B. Lynn, the first Hispanic female president of an American public university.

== See also ==
- June 1966 tornado outbreak sequence
- International Food Safety Network
