= List of the oldest buildings in Kansas =

This article lists the oldest extant buildings in Kansas, including extant buildings and structures constructed prior to and during the United States rule over Kansas. Only buildings built prior to 1860 are suitable for inclusion on this list, or the building must be the oldest of its type.

In order to qualify for the list, a structure must:

- be a recognizable building (defined as any human-made structure used or intended for supporting or sheltering any use or continuous occupancy);
- incorporate features of building work from the claimed date to at least 1.5 metres (4.9 ft) in height and/or be a listed building.

This consciously excludes ruins of limited height, roads and statues. Bridges may be included if they otherwise fulfill the above criteria. Dates for many of the oldest structures have been arrived at by radiocarbon dating or dendrochronology and should be considered approximate. If the exact year of initial construction is estimated, it will be shown as a range of dates.

== List of oldest buildings ==
Building	Image	Location	First built	Use	Notes
Fangro House		Shawnee, Kansas	ca. 1824	Residence	Oldest building in Shawnee; Located at 5707 Nieman Road; It was made of hand pressed bricks; Now located in front of an electrical business.
The Rookery		Fort Leavenworth	ca. 1834	Military residence	Oldest continuously occupied residence in Kansas.
West Building		Shawnee Methodist Mission, Johnson County, Kansas	1839	Religious/Educational	
East Building		Shawnee Methodist Mission, Johnson County, Kansas	1841	Religious/Educational	
North Building		Shawnee Methodist Mission, Johnson County, Kansas	1845	Religious/Educational	
Iowa, Sac, and Fox Presbyterian Mission		Highland, Kansas	1846	Mission	
Pottawatomie Baptist Mission Building		Topeka, Kansas	1849	School	Indian mission school
Kaw Mission		Council Grove, Kansas	1851	Religious/ Educational	
Gov. Andrew Reeder Mansion		Shawnee, Kansas	c. 1854	Residence	Home of Gov. Andrew Horatio Reeder
First Territorial Capitol of Kansas		Pawnee, Kansas	1855	Government	First territorial capitol of the state; only used for five days
Hartford House		Manhattan, Kansas	1855	Residence	Prefabricated house brought from Cincinnati to Kansas
Pottawatomie Indian Pay Station		St. Marys, Kansas	1855	Mission building	Oldest building remaining at St. Mary's Mission (Kansas)
1734 Kent Terrace		Lawrence, Kansas	1855	Residence	Oldest house in Lawrence
Levi Flint House		Johnson County, Kansas	c. 1856	Residence	
Ritchie House		Topeka, Kansas	1856	Residence	Oldest house in Topeka
Barnes Apple Barn		Baldwin City, Kansas	1857	Barn	
Christian Wetzel Cabin		Junction City, Kansas	1857	Residence	
Constitution Hall		Lecompton, Kansas	1857	Government	Second territorial capitol of Kansas
Goodnow House		Manhattan, Kansas	1857	Residence	
Grinter Place		Kansas City, Kansas	1857	Residence	Oldest house in Kansas City, KS
Hollenberg Pony Express Station		Hanover, Kansas	1857	Residence	
J. B. Mahaffie House		Olathe, Kansas	1857	Residence	
Last Chance Store		Council Grove, Kansas	1857	Commercial	
Samuel D. Houston House		Manhattan, Kansas	1857	Residence	
Samuel J. Tipton House		Harris, Kansas	1857	Residence	
William C. & Jane Shaft House		Cedar Point, Kansas	1857	Residence	
Judge James Hanway House		Lane, Kansas	1858	Residence	
Old Castle Hall		Baker University	1858	College	Oldest college building in state; Original home to Baker University, now located east of the main campus. The building predates the creation of the State of Kansas by three years. Listed on the National Register of Historic Places.
Robert H. Miller House		Lawrence, Kansas	1858	Residence	
Irvin Hall		Highland, Kansas	1859	School	first permanent building at Highland University in Highland, Kansas. It is the oldest building in Kansas still used for higher education
Dietrich Cabin		Ottawa, Kansas	1859	Residence	Oldest building in Ottawa
First Congregational Church (Manhattan, Kansas)		Manhattan, Kansas	1859	Church	Oldest Protestant church still in use by its original congregation
Fort Hays Blockhouse		Hays, Kansas	1865	Military	Oldest building in Northwest Kansas
Darius Sales Munger House		Wichita, Kansas	1868	Residence	Oldest building in Wichita, built of hewn logs.
Little Stranger Church and Cemetery		Leavenworth County, Kansas	1868	Church	Oldest wood-framed church in Kansas
Freemount Lutheran Church		Lindsborg, Kansas	1870	Church	Likely oldest Lutheran church building in Kansas; Oldest in McPherson County
Hans Hanson House cabin		Marquette, Kansas	1871	Residence	Oldest building in Marquette, where town charter was signed. On the grounds of larger residence.

== See also ==
- National Register of Historic Places listings in Kansas
- List of oldest buildings on Kansas colleges and universities
- History of Kansas
- Oldest buildings in the United States
