= Calvin Hall =

Calvin Hall may refer to:

- Calvin S. Hall (1909–1985), American psychologist
- Calvin Hall (building), a building on the campus of Kansas State University

== See also ==
- Calvin Hill (born 1947), American football player
