= Mass media in Manhattan, Kansas =

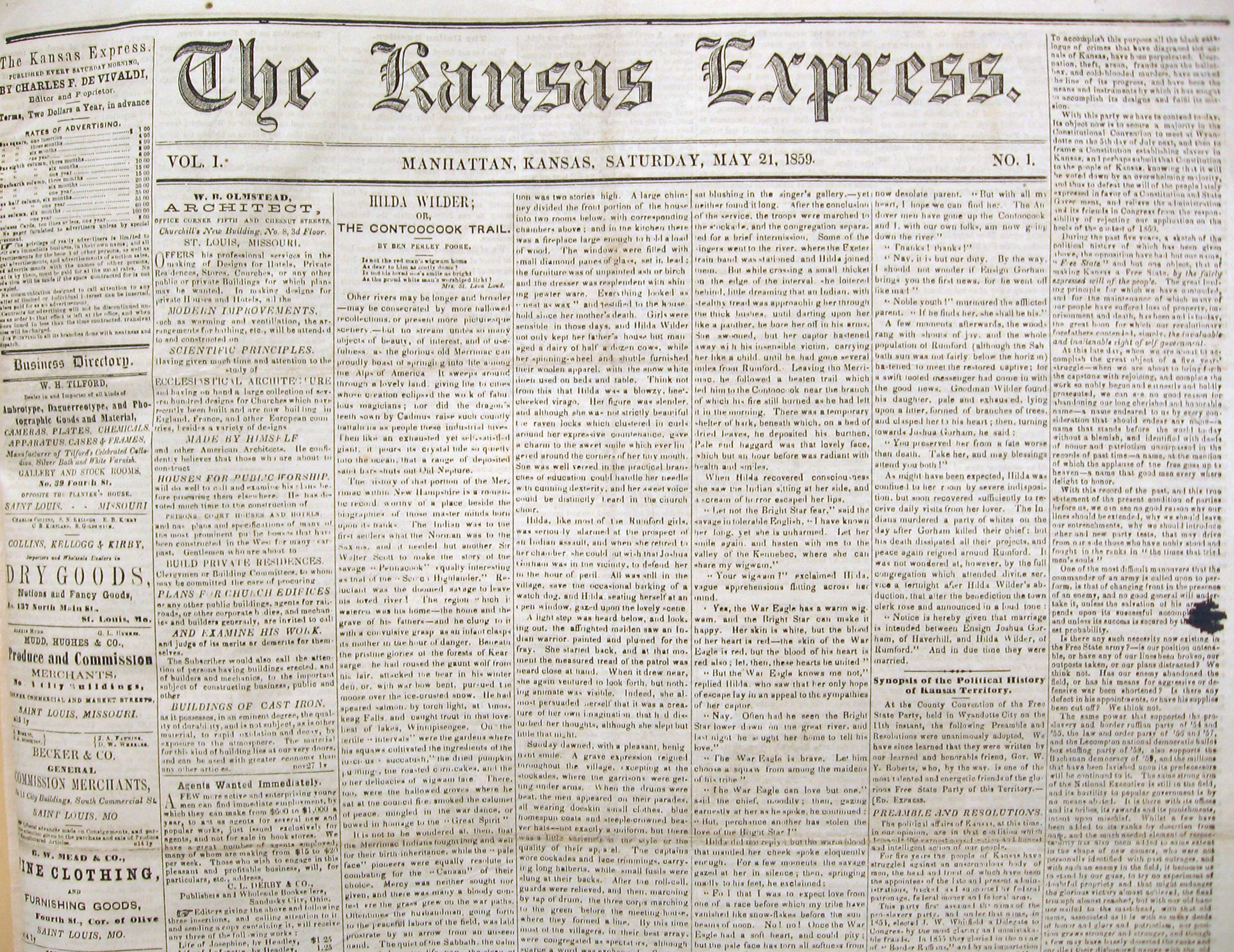
The Kansas Express in 1859 was the first news media source for Manhattan, Kansas

The following is a list of media outlets based in Manhattan, Kansas.

== Print ==
=== Newspapers ===
Manhattan has had at least one newspaper published for the town continuously since The Kansas Express published its first edition on May 21, 1859. The following newspapers currently publish in Manhattan:

- Grass & Grain – agriculture news (published weekly)
- The Kansas State Collegian – Kansas State University student newspaper (published daily during academic term)
- Keynotes News for Older Kansans – senior citizen news (published bi-monthly)
- Kansas Free Press – news (published weekly)
- The Manhattan Mercury – news (published daily)

=== History ===
Manhattan had a number of newspapers in its early years. Following is a timeline of 19th-century papers in the town:

- Kansas Express (1859–1926) – first newspaper in Manhattan, consolidated into The Manhattan Mercury
  - name changed to Independent in 1863, Standard in 1868, and Nationalist in 1870
- Kansas Radical (1866–1868) – second newspaper in Manhattan, consolidated into the Standard
- Manhattan Enterprise (1876–1909) – founded by father of Damon Runyon, consolidated into The Manhattan Mercury
  - name changed to Manhattan Republic in 1882
- The Manhattan Mercury (1884–present)

== Radio ==
The following radio stations are licensed to and/or broadcast from Manhattan:

=== AM ===
Frequency	Callsign	Format	City of License	Notes
1350	KMAN	News/Talk	Manhattan, Kansas	-

=== FM ===
Frequency	Callsign	Format	City of License	Notes
88.9	KGLV	Contemporary Christian	Manhattan, Kansas	K-LOVE
90.7	K214CZ	Religious	Manhattan, Kansas	Translator of WPCS, Pensacola, Florida
91.9	KSDB-FM	Variety	Manhattan, Kansas	Kansas State University college radio
96.3	KACZ	Top 40	Riley, Kansas	Broadcasts from Manhattan
97.9	K250AY	Public	Manhattan, Kansas	NPR; Translator of KANU, Lawrence, Kansas
99.5	K258BT	Public	Manhattan, Kansas	NPR; Translator of KANU, Lawrence, Kansas
101.5	KMKF	Rock	Manhattan, Kansas	-
104.7	KXBZ	Country	Manhattan, Kansas	-
105.5	KRMI-LP	Religious	Manhattan, Kansas	-
106.1	K291BA	Religious	Manhattan, Kansas	Translator of KCCV-FM, Overland Park, Kansas

=== History ===
The first radio station licensed in Manhattan was 9YV, an experimental station operated by Kansas State University. In 1912 the station began a daily broadcast (in morse code) of the weather forecast, becoming the first radio station in the U.S. to air a regularly scheduled forecast.

After a series of efforts to secure a more high-powered signal for the university – including a brief cooperation with John R. Brinkley's notorious KFKB – Kansas State was granted a license for KSAC, which began broadcasting with 500 watts of power on December 1, 1924. The station was reassigned to the frequency of AM 580 in 1928, and continued broadcasting on that frequency until November 27, 2002, when it made its last broadcast after the frequency was bought out by WIBW in Topeka, Kansas.

== Television ==
Manhattan is in the Topeka, Kansas television market.

The following television stations are licensed to and/or broadcast from Manhattan:

Display Channel	Network	Callsign	City of License	Notes
11.1	PBS	KTWU-LD	Manhattan, Kansas	Translator of KTWU, Topeka, Kansas
11.2	MHz WorldView	KTWU-LD	Manhattan, Kansas	Translator of KTWU, Topeka, Kansas
11.3	Enhance	KTWU-LD	Manhattan, Kansas	Translator of KTWU, Topeka, Kansas
21	-	KKSU-LD	Manhattan, Kansas	Kansas State University television
32	GCN	K32HB	Manhattan, Kansas	-
36.1	GCN	K36IO-D	Manhattan, Kansas	-

=== History ===
The history of television in Manhattan dates back to the "experimental era" of television history. On March 9, 1932, the Federal Radio Commission granted Kansas State University a license to operate the television station W9XAK. It was the first television station in Kansas. Activity on the station peaked in 1933 and 1934, with original programs being produced three nights a week. On October 28, 1939, the station broadcast the Homecoming football game in Manhattan between Kansas State and Nebraska, which was the second college football game ever televised. The station went off the air later in 1939.
