= KKSU =

KKSU may refer to:

- KKSU (AM), a defunct radio station (580 AM) in Manhattan, Kansas, United States, which was on the air from 1924 to 2002
- KKSU-LD, a low-power television station (channel 21) licensed to Manhattan, Kansas, United States
