= Kansas Motorcycle Museum =

Motorcycle museum in Marquette, Kansas

Coordinates: 38°33′15″N 97°50′01″W

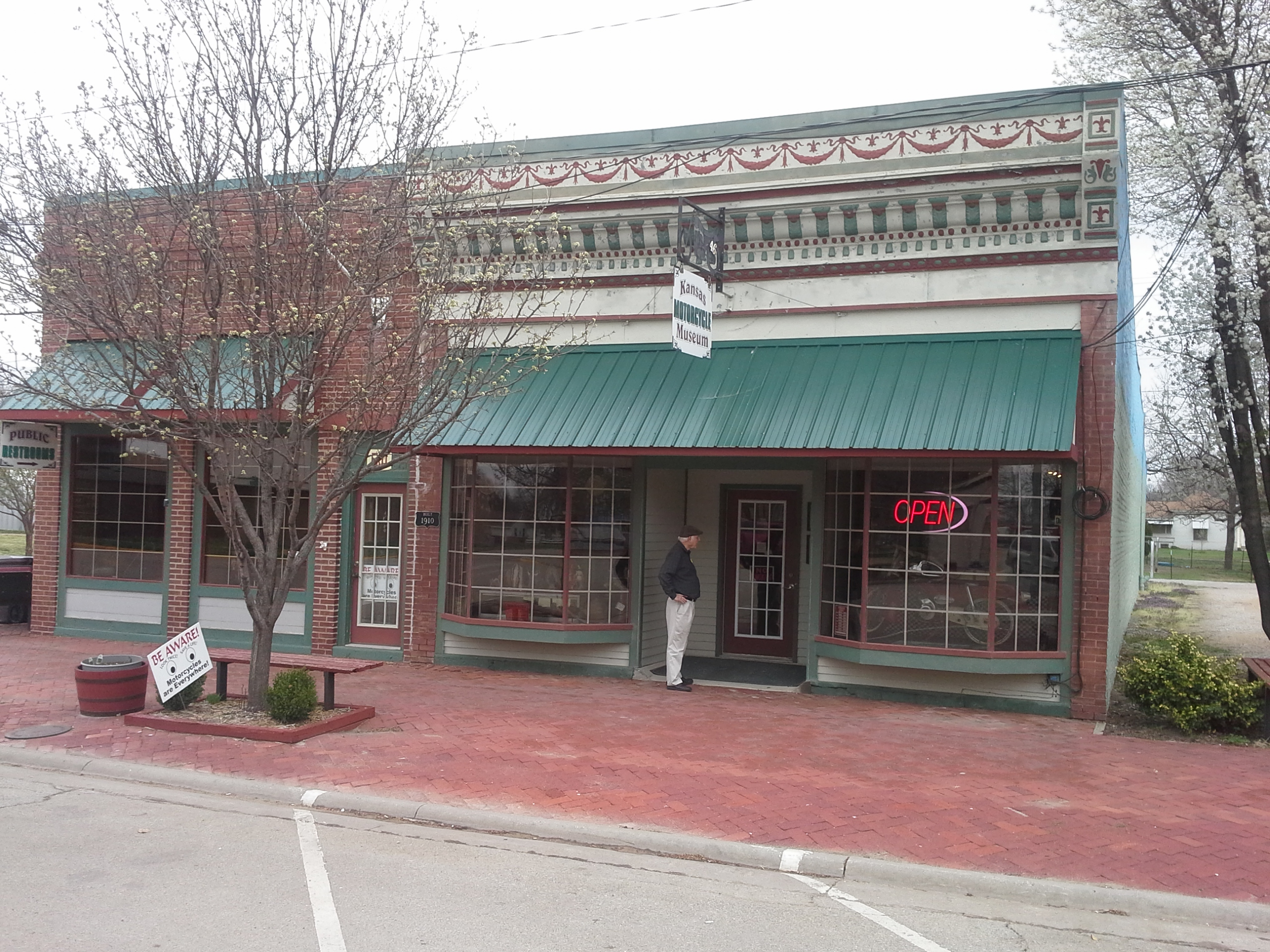
Kansas Motorcycle Museum

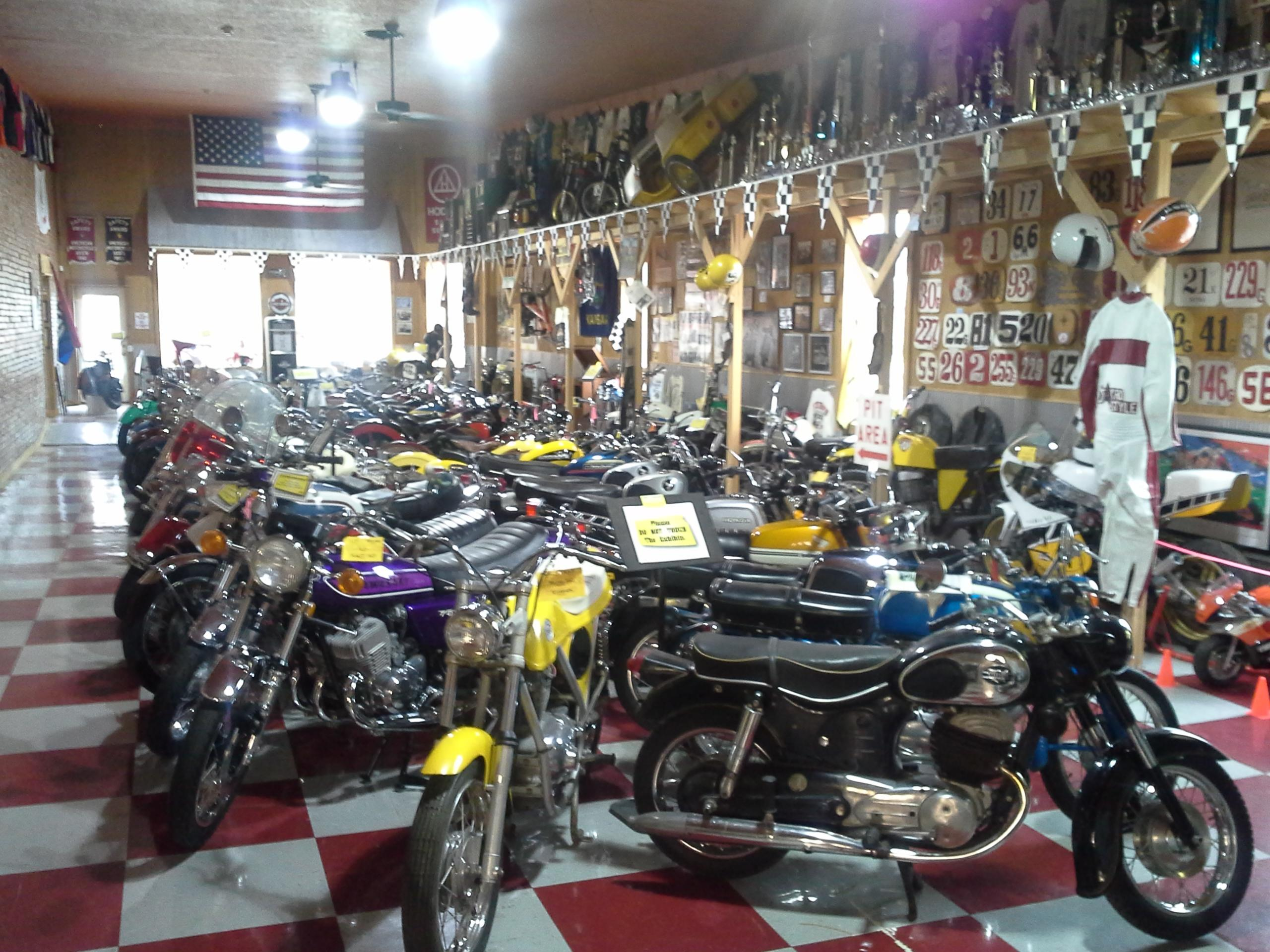
Kansas Motorcycle Museum in Marquette KS

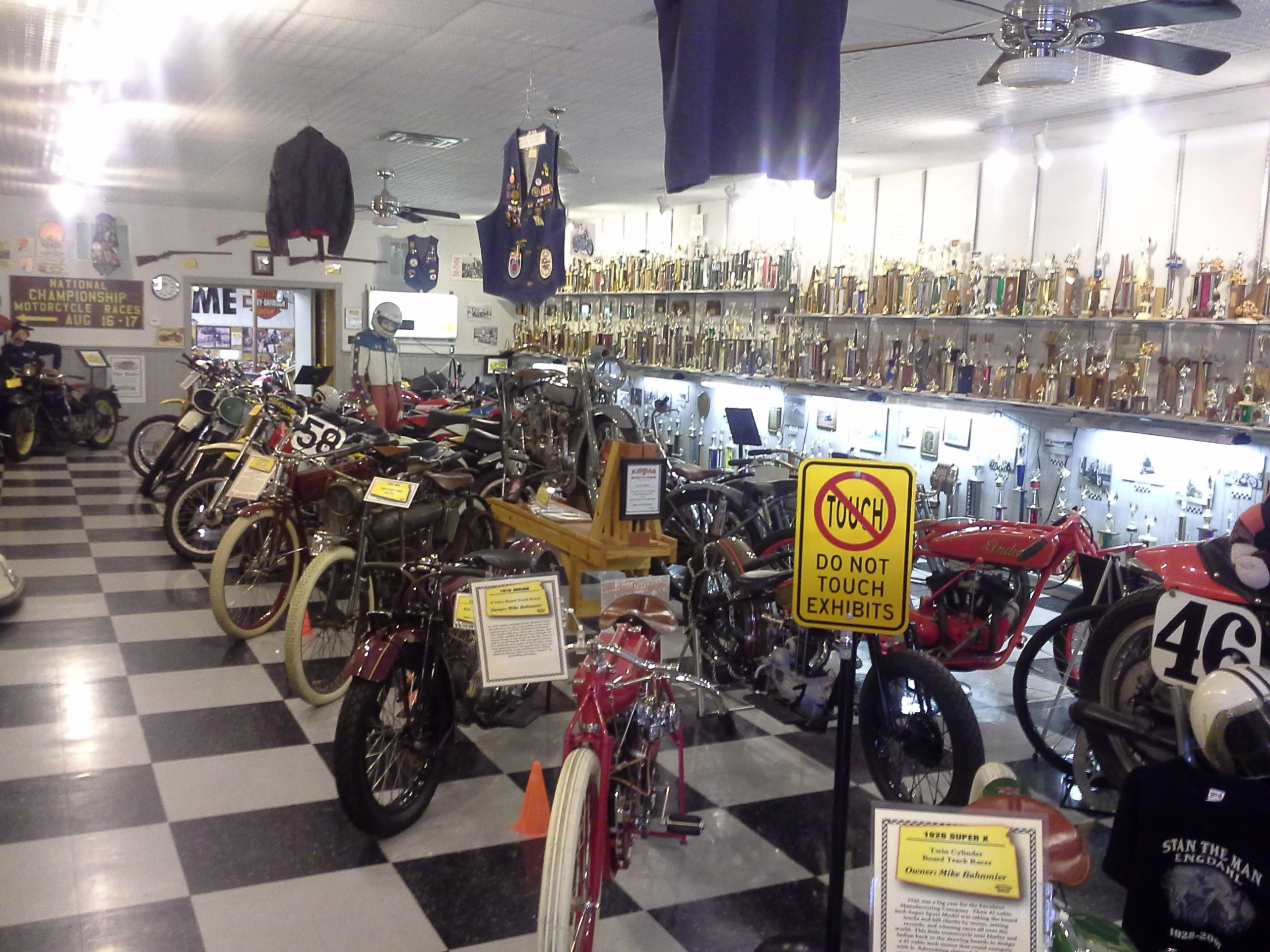
Kansas Motorcycle Museum in Marquette KS

The Kansas Motorcycle Museum is a historic motorcycle museum in Marquette, Kansas, United States. It is located on the southeast corner of Washington (the main street) and Third Street in downtown Marquette. The museum contains "over one hundred superb bikes... [s]cores of early American bikes are presented."

== History ==
The museum was founded in 2003 by motorcycle racer, Stan Engdahl, a native of Marquette who died in 2007, and features over 100 vintage and rare motorcycles of all various makes and models as well as numerous other motorcycle memorabilia and artifacts. It includes Engdahl's custom-built Harley Davidson, which he raced from the 1940s to the 1990s.

"Stan the Man" Engdahl was a motorcycle racing legend and five time National Racing Champion and well known for his victories in the scramble. Stan's wife LaVona served as curator of the museum until her death. Admission is free, but donations are welcome. The museum is open year-round and most holidays. The museum is a popular biker destination.
