= The Manhattan Mercury =

Newspaper in Manhattan, Kansas

- Type: Daily newspaper
- Format: Broadsheet
- Owner(s): Seaton Publishing Co, Inc.
- Founder(s): Jefferson J. Davis and Clair M. Patee
- Publisher: Ned Seaton
- Founded: May 9, 1884
- Headquarters: 318 North 5th Street; Manhattan, Kansas
- Circulation: 15,137
- Website: themercury.com

The Manhattan Mercury is the local newspaper for Manhattan, Kansas. The Mercury is a daily newspaper published five days a week: Tuesday-Saturday. The newspaper is physically printed on the Mercury's own in-house presses. The newspaper also maintains a news website.

== History ==
The Mercury was founded as a weekly publication on May 9, 1884, at a time when Manhattan was already served by two other competing newspapers. It became a daily on February 8, 1909.

After passing through four different owners, the newspaper was purchased by Fay N. Seaton in 1915. He was the founder of the Seaton publishing group, which still owns the paper. Fay Seaton ran the paper until his death in 1952. During his time as publisher, The Mercury bought out all of its in-town rivals, beginning with the Morning Chronicle around 1915. Seaton thereafter operated the Chronicle as a separate paper until 1943, when it was merged with the Mercury. In 1926, Seaton purchased the Manhattan Nationalist – the oldest newspaper in Manhattan, dating back to 1859 – and began operating under both names (until 1943). Fay Seaton's son Fred Andrew Seaton ran another newspaper in the Seaton publishing group, the Hastings (Neb.) Tribune, before entering into politics.

In 2021, the paper decreased it's print schedule from five to three days a week.

== See also ==
- Media in Manhattan, Kansas
- List of newspapers in Kansas
