= List of oldest buildings on Kansas colleges and universities =

The following is a list of the oldest buildings on Kansas college and university campuses, all of which were built prior to 1910. Twelve individual buildings and one complex of buildings are listed on the United States Department of the Interior's National Register of Historic Places.

Kansas State University has the most buildings on this list, with eleven. The list does not include buildings that were built elsewhere and subsequently relocated onto campuses, such as the Osborne Chapel at Baker University, which was built in England in 1864 and moved to the Baker campus in 1996.

Building	Photo	Location	Built	Notes/Source
Old Castle Hall		Baker University	1858	Original home to Baker University, now located east of the main campus. The building predates the creation of the State of Kansas by three years. Listed on the National Register of Historic Places.
Stone House (now part of Hoeflin Stone House)		Kansas State University	1866	Originally built as a limestone house by the father of Samuel Wendell Williston in 1866, the walls of the original cabin are now just an interior decorative element in a much larger building.
Tauy Jones Hall		Ottawa University	1869	It was gutted by fire in 1875 and rebuilt in 1876. Listed on the National Register of Historic Places.
College Building / St. Pius X Hall		St. Mary's College	1871	All of the buildings on this list from the St. Mary's campus were built by an earlier college, also called St. Mary's, which opened in 1870 and closed in 1931. The earlier college has no affiliation with the current school. The current St. Mary's College opened for classes in 1979.
Parmenter Hall		Baker University	1871	Listed on the National Register of Historic Places.
Pulliam Center		Baker University	1872	Listed on the National Register of Historic Places.
Industrial Workshop (now part of Seaton Court)		Kansas State University	1874	The Industrial Workshop was one of two original educational buildings on the campus when Kansas State relocated to its current location in 1875. The building now forms a part of Seaton Court.
Holtz Hall		Kansas State University	1876	Oldest free-standing building on the Kansas State University campus.
Bishop Fink Hall		Benedictine College	1878	Included on the National Register of Historic Places as part of the Benedictine College Historic Complex.
Anderson Hall		Kansas State University	1879-1885	Built and opened in three separate stages, starting in 1879. Listed on the National Register of Historic Places.
Coppens Hall		St. Mary's College	1883	*The building is located on the St. Mary's campus, but it is currently used by the St. Mary's Academy (K-12) and not the college.
Cooper Hall		Sterling College	1887	Listed on the National Register of Historic Places.
Powerhouse (now part of Hall Center for Humanities)		University of Kansas	1887	The arches from the 1887 structure serve as an exterior decorative element on the Hall Center, built in 2002.
Suarez Hall		St. Mary's College	1887	*The building is located on the St. Mary's campus, but it is currently used by the St. Mary's Academy (K-12) and not the college.
Davis Administration Building		Friends University	1888	Listed on the National Register of Historic Places.
McCabe Hall		St. Mary's College	1888	*The building is located on the St. Mary's campus, but it is currently used by the St. Mary's Academy (K-12) and not the college.
Convent		St. Mary's College	1890	
Library		St. Mary's College	1891	
Administrative Building		Bethel College	1893	Listed on the National Register of Historic Places.
Ferrell Hall		Benedictine College	1893	Included on the National Register of Historic Places as part of the Benedictine College Historic Complex.
Goerz House		Bethel College	1893	Listed on the National Register of Historic Places.
Fairchild Hall		Kansas State University	1894	
Spooner Hall		University of Kansas	1894	Oldest free-standing building on the University of Kansas campus. Listed on the National Register of Historic Places.
Kedzie Hall		Kansas State University	1897	
Hiawatha Hall		Haskell Indian Nations University	1898	
Stauffer-Flint Hall		University of Kansas	1899	Built as the Fowler Shops for engineering students.
Bailey Hall		University of Kansas	1900	Listed on the National Register of Historic Places.
Holton Hall		Kansas State University	1900	
Kiva Hall		Haskell Indian Nations University	1900	
One Room Schoolhouse		Emporia State University	1900	Officially named Dobbs School
Dyche Hall		University of Kansas	1903	Listed on the National Register of Historic Places.
Fiske Hall		Wichita State University	1904	
Picken Hall		Fort Hays State University	1904	
Lippincott Hall		University of Kansas	1905	
Martin Allen Hall		Fort Hays State University	1905	
Beeghly Hall		McPherson College	1906	Originally built as a Carnegie library.
Case Hall		Baker University	1907	
Dickens Hall		Kansas State University	1907	
Greenhouse–Conservatory		Kansas State University	1907	
Loyola Hall		St. Mary's College	1907	
Calvin Hall		Kansas State University	1908	
Leasure Hall		Kansas State University	1908	
Marvin Hall		University of Kansas	1908	
Russ Hall		Pittsburg State University	1908	
Christy Administration Building		Southwestern College	1909	

== See also ==
- List of the oldest buildings in Kansas
