= KKSU (AM) =

Radio station in Manhattan, Kansas (1924–2002)

- Manhattan, Kansas; United States
- Broadcast area: Topeka, Kansas
- Frequency: 580 kHz (time-share with WIBW (580 AM))
- Branding: KKSU 580 AM

Ownership
- Owner: Kansas State University

History
- First air date: December 1, 1924
- Last air date: November 27, 2002; (77 years, 361 days)
- Former call signs: KSAC (1924–1984); KEXT (1984)
- Call sign meaning: Kansas State University

Technical information
- Facility ID: 33356
- Class: B
- Power: 5,000 watts (weekday afternoons only)
- Transmitter coordinates: 39°13′1.20″N 96°35′9.60″W

KKSU was an AM radio station in Manhattan, Kansas, that broadcast from 1924 to 2002. The station was owned by Kansas State University (KSU) and operated by K-State Research and Extension, with studios and transmitter on KSU's campus in Manhattan. At the time it ended operations, it was one-half of one of the last shared-time frequencies in the United States.

For decades KKSU had provided a "K-State Radio Network" service, which mailed programs and features to radio stations across the nation. After KKSU ceased broadcasting, former staff continued to operate the network service, while also starting the construction of a satellite uplink for distribution to member stations. The site was licensed in July 2003, and a couple of months later the daily program Agriculture Today began to be delivered. The K-State Radio Network continues to produce and distribute agricultural news, family and public affairs programming to radio stations and networks across the Midwest.

== History ==
=== Earlier college operations by 9YV and WTG ===
Following a limited amount of radio—then commonly known as "wireless telegraphy"—research that started in 1901, the Physics Department obtained a "Technical and Training School" license for station 9YV. The department installed an aerial that stretched from a tower atop Denison Hall to one erected about 100 yards (90 m) northward, and began daily broadcasts of the weather forecasts. These were in the dots-and-dashes of Morse code which were received as far as Wichita, Winfield, and Bennington, Kansas. This was believed to have been the first radio broadcasts in the United States of weather reports on a fixed schedule.

With the entry of the United States into World War I, most civilian stations, including 9YV, were ordered dismantled, although laboratory work and army signal corps training at the college continued. After the end of the war, civilian stations were again permitted, and 9YV was relicensed, and resumed its broadcasts of daily weather broadcasts. In March 1920, multiple Kansas newspapers printed instructions for receiving the daily (except Sunday) weather reports by 9YV on a wavelength of 375 meters (800 kHz), which were sent beginning at 9:55 a.m., then repeated at decreasing speeds of Morse code.

In the fall of 1921 Professor Eric R. Lyon became responsible for 9YV's operations. Effective December 1, 1921, the Department of Commerce, which regulated radio at this time, adopted regulations requiring that stations broadcasting to the general public had to have a Limited Commercial license. Two wavelengths were designated for use by broadcasting stations: 360 meters (833 kHz) for "entertainment" programs, and 485 meters (619 kHz) for "market and weather" reports.

The college applied for a broadcasting station license under the new regulations, which was issued on April 6, 1922 to the Kansas State Agricultural College, for operation on the 485 meter "market and weather" wavelength. The call sign of WTG was randomly assigned from a list of available call letters. (Most later stations west of the Mississippi River received call letters beginning with "K". However, WTG was licensed before the government changed the dividing line between W and K call signs. Prior to the January 1923 establishment of the Mississippi River as the boundary, call letters beginning with "W" were generally assigned to stations east of an irregular line formed by the western state borders from North Dakota south to Texas, with calls beginning with "K" going only to stations in states west of that line.)

WTG was one of the first of several AM stations established by Midwestern land-grant colleges in the early days of broadcasting, among them Iowa State's WOI, South Dakota's WEAJ, Iowa's WHAA, Michigan State's WKAR, and North Dakota's KFJM.

Beginning in 1923 additional frequencies are made available for broadcasting stations, and WTG was reassigned to 1100 kHz in May 1924, before being deleted on December 19, 1925. The next month, the stations's history was described as: "Some years ago the physics department had a radio broadcasting station WTG, which was the pioneer as far as broadcasting was concerned. Prof. J. O. Hamilton used the station for research work, broadcasting principally weather forecasts that were taken by operators who knew the code. Some musical programs were broadcast. When the large radio broadcasting station, KSAC, was fitted up, it was no longer necessary to maintain the station WTG and that license was surrendered. The department will receive a technical license for experimental work instead of the broadcasting license, according to Professor Hamilton."

=== College broadcasts over KFKB ===
Kansas State traditionally considered that its mission included the entire state of Kansas. This soon included radio broadcasts, which the extension agents saw as a natural adjunct to the school's agricultural services. However, the college initially did not have the funds needed to upgrade to a more powerful and up-to-date broadcast service. Therefore, in 1924 Professor Lyon made arrangements for college programs to be carried by telephone line from Manhattan, for broadcast by a 500-watt station at Milford, KFKB. A "College of the Air" series started on February 11, 1924, which ran for ten weeks. Several hundred listeners enrolled, in addition to an estimated thousands who just listened to the broadcasts.

=== KSAC and KKSU ===
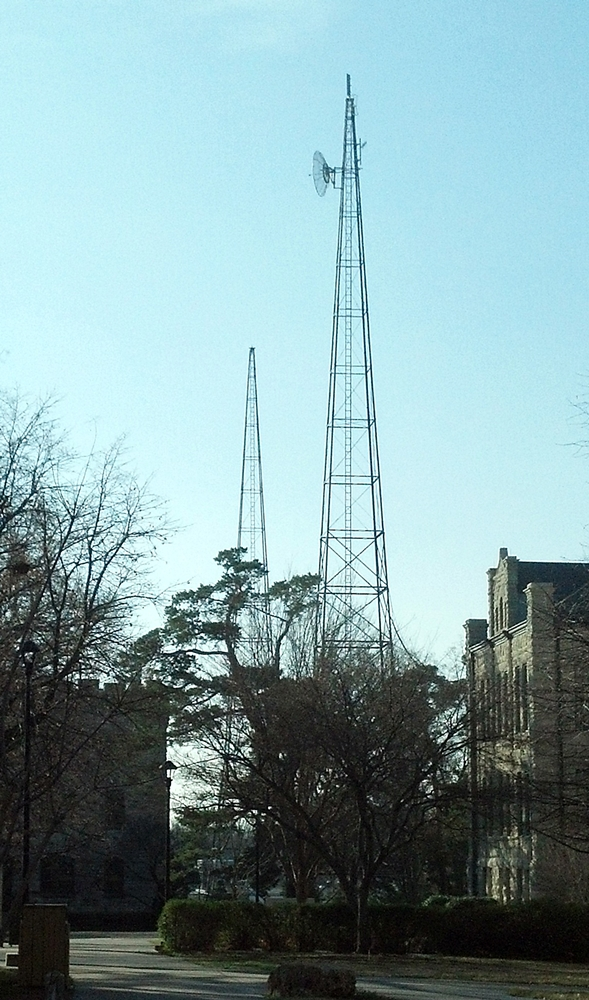
The radio towers for KSAC, erected next to Calvin Hall; the towers have since been listed in the National Register of Historic Places.

Hundreds of letters were received praising the KFKB broadcasts. In response to the success, President Jardine and Dean Umberger convinced the State Board of Administration to provide an appropriation of $20,000 for the erection of an up-to-date broadcasting station at the college, which was announced by Hon. A. B. Carney, chairman of the Board, at the alumni-senior banquet on May 28, 1924. A 500-watt Western Electric transmitting set was purchased in July, and two 150 foot (45 m) towers were erected west of Nichols Gymnasium to support a transmitting antenna. A room on the third floor of the gymnasium was equipped for the new station's use. Because construction of the new station could not begin immediately, broadcasts over KFKB were restarted on September 15.

This new college station was assigned the specially requested call letters of KSAC, and was initially licensed for 500 watts at 880 kHz. Although government regulators generally treated WTG and KSAC as separate stations, when the Federal Radio Commission prepared individual History Card files in 1927, which were taken over by the Federal Communications Commission in 1934, the "Date First Licensed" for KSAC was entered as "4-6-[19]22", which is the date when WTG received its initial license.

The College of the Air broadcasts were transferred from KFKB to KSAC in late November 1924. A formal station dedication program was broadcast from 8:00 to 12:00 p.m. on December 1, 1924. This opened with the ringing of the College bell, and included speeches, reminiscences, and music, and a paper, "In the Beginning", presented by Mrs. Emma Haines Bowen, the only survivor of the class of 1867, which was the first class to be graduated. Congratulations received by telephone and telegraph were read to the radio audience.

in January 1926, KSAC's daily broadcast schedule was reported as "beginning at 9 a.m., for the rural schools; 9:55 for the housewives' half-hour; 12:35 for the noonday program and question box; 4:30 in the afternoon, for the matinee; 6:30, the regular 'college of the air', conducted by professors in the various departments, with musical features in the connection with the lectures".

In 1927, KSAC moved to 900 kHz, and on November 11, 1928, with the implementation of the Federal Radio Commission's General Order 40, it was moved to 580 kHz, sharing broadcast time on this frequency with the University of Iowa's WSUI.

In 1930, Senator Arthur Capper, publisher of Topeka's daily newspaper, the Topeka Daily Capital, asked Kansas State to share time on 580 kHz with his new station, WIBW, replacing WSUI. Kansas State agreed, realizing that it could not afford to make full-time use of their assignment.

In 1948, KSAC boosted its transmitter power to 5,000 watts, matching its commercial partner. Because 580 kHz is one of the lowest frequencies on the AM band, the station had an expansive groundwave signal, which provided daytime coverage of most of the state. The station was off the air at the end of 1950 and early 1951 after losing its transmitter to fire.

In 1984 KSAC wanted to change its call letters from KSAC to KKSU, almost 30 years after the school had become a university instead of an agricultural college. However, a mothballed Merchant Marine ship, the Hunter Victory, was still technically assigned this call sign, and was reluctant to give it up. As a stopgap, on July 26 KSAC changed its call sign to its second choice, KEXT (Kansas EXTension). The KSAC call sign was sold for $25,000 to the former KROY-FM in Sacramento, California. Efforts continued to get the preferred KKSU call letters, which soon became available, and were assigned four days later.

By the mid-1990s, KKSU was on the air from 12:30 pm to 5:30 pm Central Time every weekday, airing livestock reports, agricultural updates, and news programming. For several years, it also had a daily hour of recorded classical music called Music From the Masters.

=== KKSU shutdown ===
WIBW unsuccessfully tried several times to expand to unlimited hours on 580 kHz, especially after 1957, when Oscar Stauffer bought the Daily Capital (and later merged it into the Topeka Capital-Journal) Despite tremendous political pressure, KSAC/KKSU stayed on the air.

In December 2001, Kansas State moved its sports broadcasts to the Mid-America Ag Network (MAAN) after airing them on WIBW continuously since 1969 and off-and-on since the 1950s. WIBW countered by citing a 1969 amendment to the timeshare agreement, that granted WIBW the right to broadcast Wildcat football in exchange for allowing KKSU (then still KSAC) to extend its operating hours an additional 15 minutes each weekday.

After heated negotiations, WIBW's owner, Morris Communications (which bought WIBW in 1994) agreed to ignore the agreement if KKSU would give it full control of their shared frequency. On August 29, Morris agreed to buy KKSU's timeslot for $1.5 million. In return, it agreed to give exclusive rights to all Wildcat sporting events to MAAN.

KKSU made its final broadcast on November 27, 2002, allowing WIBW to now operate as a full-time station.
