= Samuel J. Tipton House =

Historic house in Kansas, United States

- U.S. National Register of Historic Places
- Location within Kansas Location within the United States
- Location: 4 miles (6.4 km) southwest of Harris, Kansas
- Coordinates: 38°17′36″N 95°29′26″W
- Area: 2.5 acres (1.0 ha)
- Built: c.1857
- NRHP reference No.: 75000703
- Added to NRHP: January 23, 1975

The Samuel J. Tipton House, near Harris, Kansas, dates from 1857. It was listed on the National Register of Historic Places in 1975.

The house, also called Mineral Point Mansion, was built for Samuel J. Tipton, who introduced Shorthorn cattle to Kansas. The house served as a post office, as a general store, and as a stage-stop.
