= Christian Wetzel Cabin =

Historic house in Kansas, United States

- U.S. National Register of Historic Places
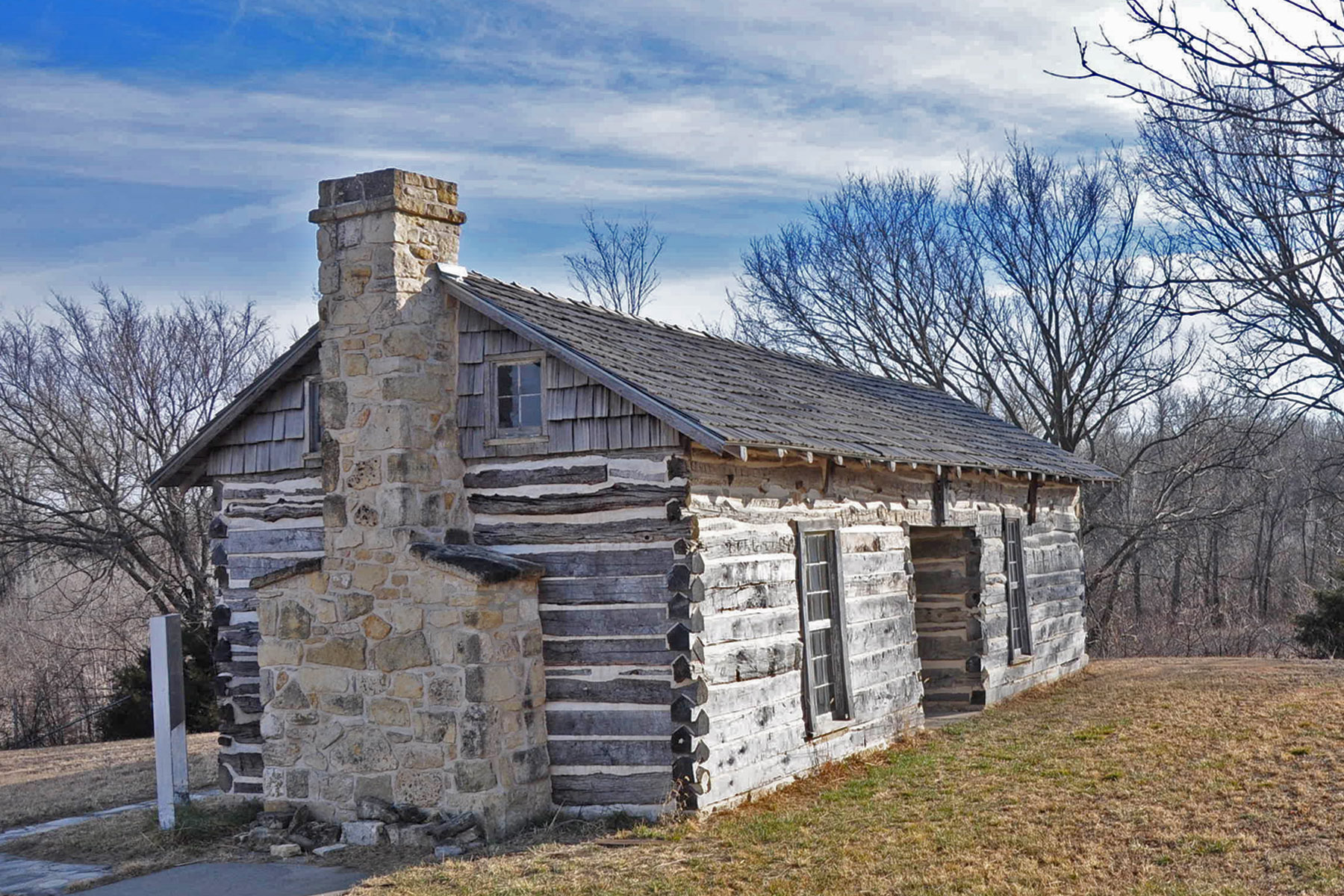

- Location within Kansas Location within the United States
- Location: About 2 miles (3.2 km) east of Junction City, Kansas at the junction of Interstate 70 and K-57
- Coordinates: 39.029379°N 96.871941°W
- Area: less than one acre
- Built: 1857
- Built by: Isaac H. Loder
- NRHP reference No.: 73000757
- Added to NRHP: October 15, 1973

The Christian Wetzel Cabin, near Junction City, Kansas, also known as the Louis Kettlass Cabin, was built in 1857 by Isaac H. Loder for $225 for Louis Kettlass. It was listed on the National Register of Historic Places in 1973.

It is a one-story log cabin with a loft.

The cabin was relocated in about 1955 by the Kansas District Lutheran-Laymen's League, which restored the structure and opened it as a Lutheran historical site and museum. The site was relocated again in 2004 to the west side of Junction City to the Spring Valley Historic Site.
