= William C. & Jane Shaft House =

Historic house in Kansas, United States

- U.S. National Register of Historic Places
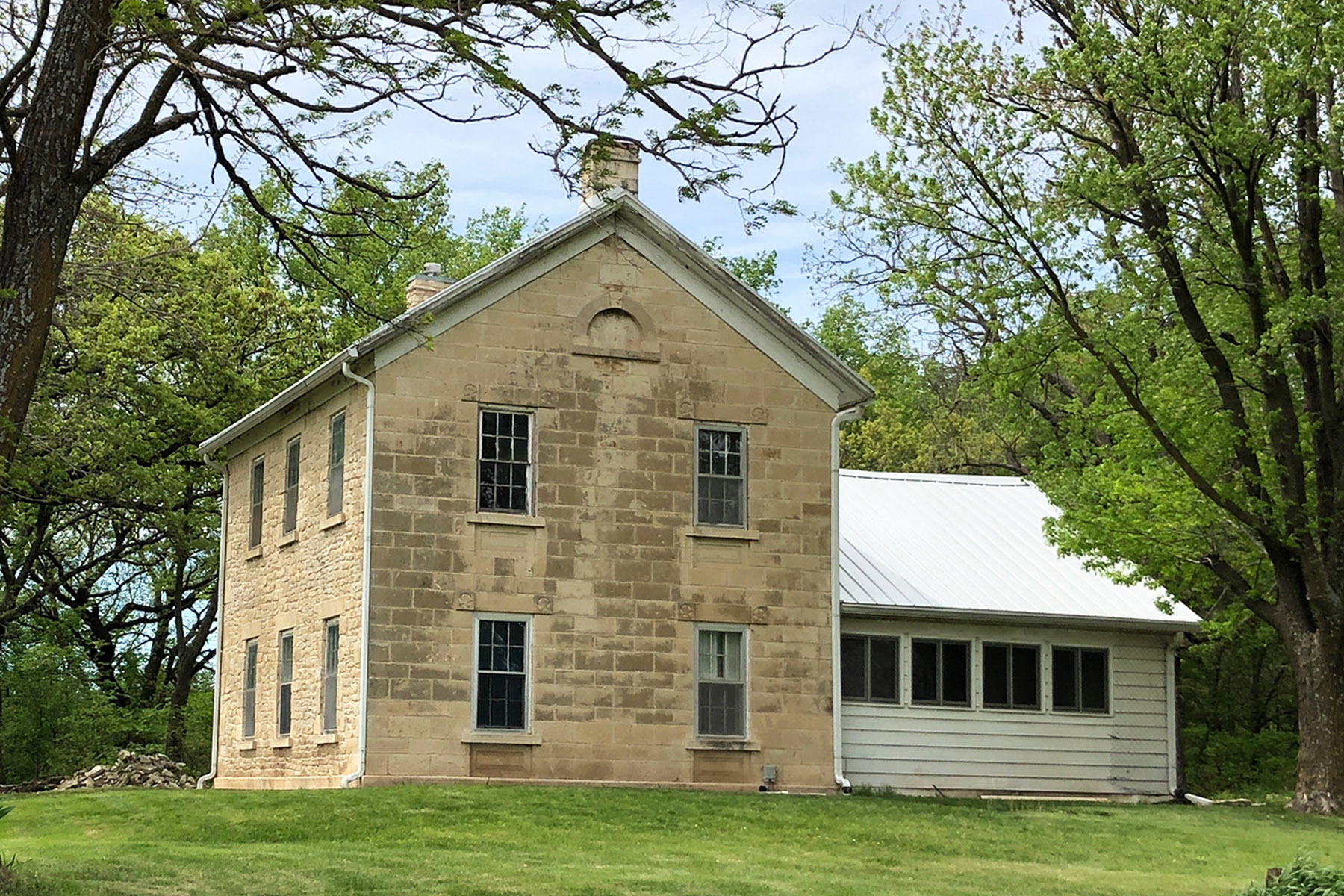

- Location within Kansas
- Location: 1682 FP Rd, Cedar Point, Kansas
- Coordinates: 38°18′53″N 96°43′58″W
- Area: less than one acre
- Built: 1857
- NRHP reference No.: 10000449
- Added to NRHP: July 8, 2010

The William C. & Jane Shaft House is a historic house at 1682 FP Road north of Clements, Kansas. The original house was built in 1857 by William C. Shaft and his son William H.; the rest of the Shaft family, including his wife Jane, moved to the site later in the year, making them one of the first pioneer families in Chase County. William C. Shaft drowned the following year, and Jane attempted to return to the family's previous home in Michigan; however, her children convinced her to keep the family in Kansas. William and Jane's five sons built a two-story addition to the house in 1868, engraving the cornerstone with Jane's name. The stone house has a vernacular gable front and wing plan, which was common in homes built in multiple stages. As there were few other buildings in the area, the Shaft family ran a post office in their home and hosted early community gatherings for other settlers.

The house was added to the National Register of Historic Places on July 8, 2010.
