= Marquette, Kansas =

City in McPherson County, Kansas

- City
- Marquette's Missouri Pacific Railroad stop at the turn of the twentieth century

- Location within McPherson County and Kansas

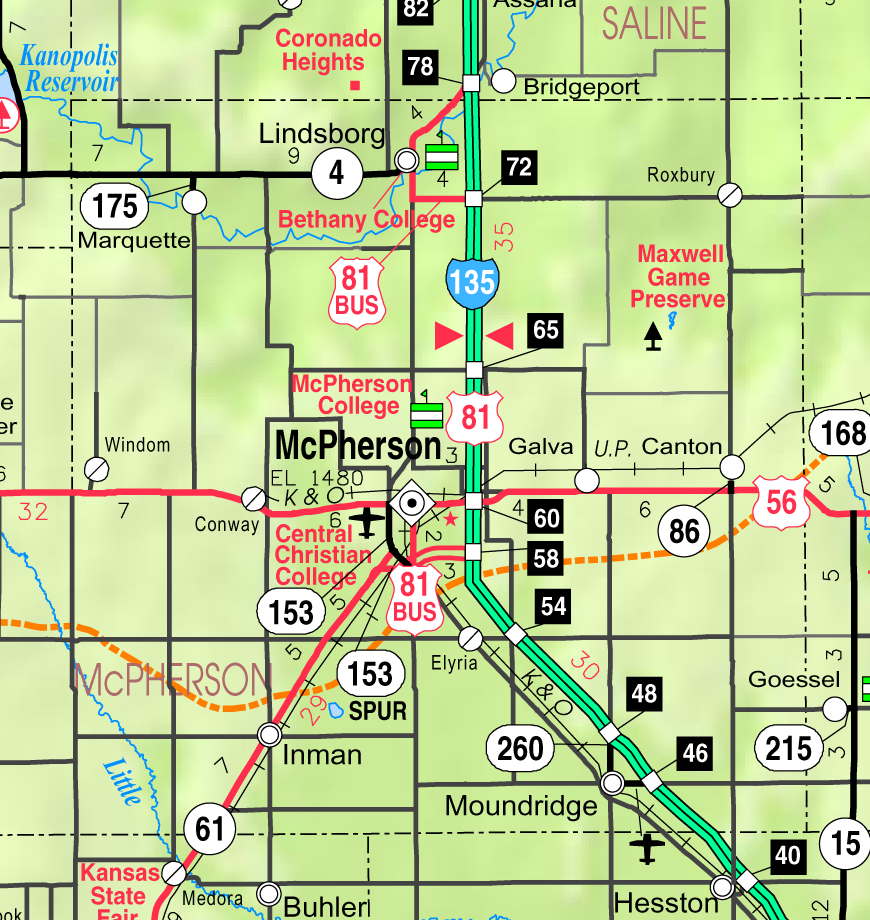
- KDOT map of McPherson County (legend)
- Coordinates: 38°33′20″N 97°50′04″W
- Country: United States
- State: Kansas
- County: McPherson
- Founded: 1874
- Incorporated: 1874
- Named for: Marquette, Michigan

Government
  - Type: Mayor–Council

Area
  - Total: 0.48 sq mi (1.25 km^{2})
  - Land: 0.48 sq mi (1.25 km^{2})
  - Water: 0 sq mi (0.00 km^{2})
- Elevation: 1,391 ft (424 m)

Population (2020)
  - Total: 599
  - Density: 1,240/sq mi (479/km^{2})
- Time zone: UTC-6 (CST)
  - Summer (DST): UTC-5 (CDT)
- ZIP Code: 67464
- Area code: 785
- FIPS code: 20-44925
- GNIS ID: 2395018
- Website: marquettekansas.com

Marquette is a city in McPherson County, Kansas, United States. As of the 2020 census, the population of the city was 599. It is located between K-4 and the Smoky Hill River.

== History ==
For millennia, the land now known as Kansas was inhabited by Native Americans. In 1803, most of modern Kansas was secured by the United States as part of the Louisiana Purchase. In 1854, the Kansas Territory was organized, and then in 1861, Kansas became the 34th U.S. state. In 1867, McPherson County was founded.

In 1873, what eventually would become Marquette began on the banks of the Smoky Hill River with a flour mill. The site was surveyed and on February 9, 1874, the town was chartered. It was settled by Swedish immigrants and Civil War veterans. It was named after Marquette, Michigan. Marquette was located on the Missouri Pacific Railroad.

On the night of May 8–9, 1905, an F4 tornado destroyed much of the town, killing 34 people. Many homes in town were blown away and entire families were killed.

On April 14, 2012, a large EF4 tornado would pass to the west of Marquette, sweeping a home away leaving an empty foundation and a small staircase, and there were no fatalities or injuries. Damage at this location would be the most severe near or in the small community of Langley.

== Geography ==
Marquette is located in the Smoky Hills region of Kansas. The area is highlighted by outcrops of Cretaceous-era sandstone known as the Dakota Formation. Erosion of those strata has left hills and buttes which rise sharply about the surrounding plains.

According to the United States Census Bureau, the city has a total area of 0.44 square miles (1.14 km^{2}), all land.

=== Climate ===
The climate in this area is characterized by hot, humid summers and generally mild to cool winters. According to the Köppen Climate Classification system, Marquette has a humid subtropical climate, abbreviated "Cfa" on climate maps.

== Demographics ==
Historical population
Census	Pop.	Note	%±
1890	367		—
1900	489		33.2%
1910	715		46.2%
1920	780		9.1%
1930	714		−8.5%
1940	609		−14.7%
1950	666		9.4%
1960	607		−8.9%
1970	578		−4.8%
1980	639		10.6%
1990	593		−7.2%
2000	542		−8.6%
2010	641		18.3%
2020	599		−6.6%
U.S. Decennial Census

In May 2003, facing a declining population, Marquette was the first of at least ten other Kansas cities, including Ellsworth, Kanopolis, Holyrood and Wilson, who offer free land to attract residents. Fifty acres (200,000 m^{2}) of what used to be farmland were developed, furnished with gravel streets, water, electric, sewer and gas hookups. In less than one year, twenty-one of the ⅓ acre (1,300 m^{2}) lots created for this purpose were claimed. The program requires the landowners to build a house on the lot within a year, and live in that house for a year.

=== 2020 census ===
The 2020 United States census counted 599 people, 274 households, and 161 families in Marquette. The population density was 1,242.7 per square mile (479.8/km^{2}). There were 310 housing units at an average density of 643.2 per square mile (248.3/km^{2}). The racial makeup was 94.99% (569) white or European American (92.65% non-Hispanic white), 0.17% (1) black or African-American, 0.17% (1) Native American or Alaska Native, 0.0% (0) Asian, 0.0% (0) Pacific Islander or Native Hawaiian, 0.67% (4) from other races, and 4.01% (24) from two or more races. Hispanic or Latino of any race was 3.84% (23) of the population.

Of the 274 households, 24.8% had children under the age of 18; 42.7% were married couples living together; 33.2% had a female householder with no spouse or partner present. 39.1% of households consisted of individuals and 20.8% had someone living alone who was 65 years of age or older. The average household size was 1.9 and the average family size was 2.3. The percent of those with a bachelor's degree or higher was estimated to be 15.0% of the population.

19.7% of the population was under the age of 18, 4.0% from 18 to 24, 20.4% from 25 to 44, 28.0% from 45 to 64, and 27.9% who were 65 years of age or older. The median age was 50.5 years. For every 100 females, there were 117.8 males. For every 100 females ages 18 and older, there were 123.7 males.

The 2016–2020 5-year American Community Survey estimates show that the median household income was $49,643 (with a margin of error of +/- $5,009) and the median family income was $50,833 (+/- $7,027). Males had a median income of $40,938 (+/- $15,882) versus $26,333 (+/- $5,321) for females. The median income for those above 16 years old was $29,153 (+/- $2,788). Approximately, 11.2% of families and 14.6% of the population were below the poverty line, including 47.5% of those under the age of 18 and 2.2% of those ages 65 or over.

=== 2010 census ===
As of the census of 2010, there were 641 people, 272 households, and 162 families residing in the city. The population density was 1,456.8 inhabitants per square mile (562.5/km^{2}). There were 311 housing units at an average density of 706.8 per square mile (272.9/km^{2}). The racial makeup of the city was 96.1% White, 0.2% African American, 0.2% Native American, 2.0% from other races, and 1.6% from two or more races. Hispanic or Latino of any race were 4.5% of the population.

There were 272 households, of which 25.7% had children under the age of 18 living with them, 45.6% were married couples living together, 9.9% had a female householder with no husband present, 4.0% had a male householder with no wife present, and 40.4% were non-families. 36.0% of all households were made up of individuals, and 15.8% had someone living alone who was 65 years of age or older. The average household size was 2.23 and the average family size was 2.90.

The median age in the city was 45.4 years. 22.8% of residents were under the age of 18; 5.8% were between the ages of 18 and 24; 20.7% were from 25 to 44; 27.9% were from 45 to 64; and 22.9% were 65 years of age or older. The gender makeup of the city was 45.6% male and 54.4% female.

=== 2000 census ===
As of the census of 2000, there were 542 people, 243 households, and 157 families residing in the city, a decline from the total 1990 population of 593. The population density was 1,503.8 inhabitants per square mile (580.6/km^{2}). There were 271 housing units at an average density of 751.9 per square mile (290.3/km^{2}). The racial makeup of the city was 98.34% White, 0.37% Native American, 0.18% from other races, and 1.11% from two or more races. 0.18% of the population were Hispanic or Latino of any race.

There were 243 households, out of which 25.9% had children under the age of 18 living with them, 53.1% were married couples living together, 6.6% had a female householder with no husband present, and 35.0% were non-families. 31.7% of all households were made up of individuals, and 17.3% had someone living alone who was 65 years of age or older. The average household size was 2.23 and the average family size was 2.77.

In the city, the population was spread out, with 22.1% under the age of 18, 6.6% from 18 to 24, 29.0% from 25 to 44, 24.5% from 45 to 64, and 17.7% who were 65 years of age or older. The median age was 41 years. For every 100 females, there were 96.4 males. For every 100 females age 18 and over, there were 90.1 males.

As of 2000 the median income for a household in the city was $35,938, and the median income for a family was $44,531. Males had a median income of $30,000 versus $20,208 for females. The per capita income for the city was $17,965. 5.6% of the population and 3.8% of families were below the poverty line. Out of the total population, none of those under the age of 18 and 8.7% of those 65 and older were living below the poverty line.

== Economy ==
Marquette is a town that is offering parcels of residential land for free on the condition that the recipient build a home within a specified deadline. In the few years since the program's inception, it has attracted an influx of new residents from who have decided to take advantage of the program and enjoy small-town living.

== Attractions ==
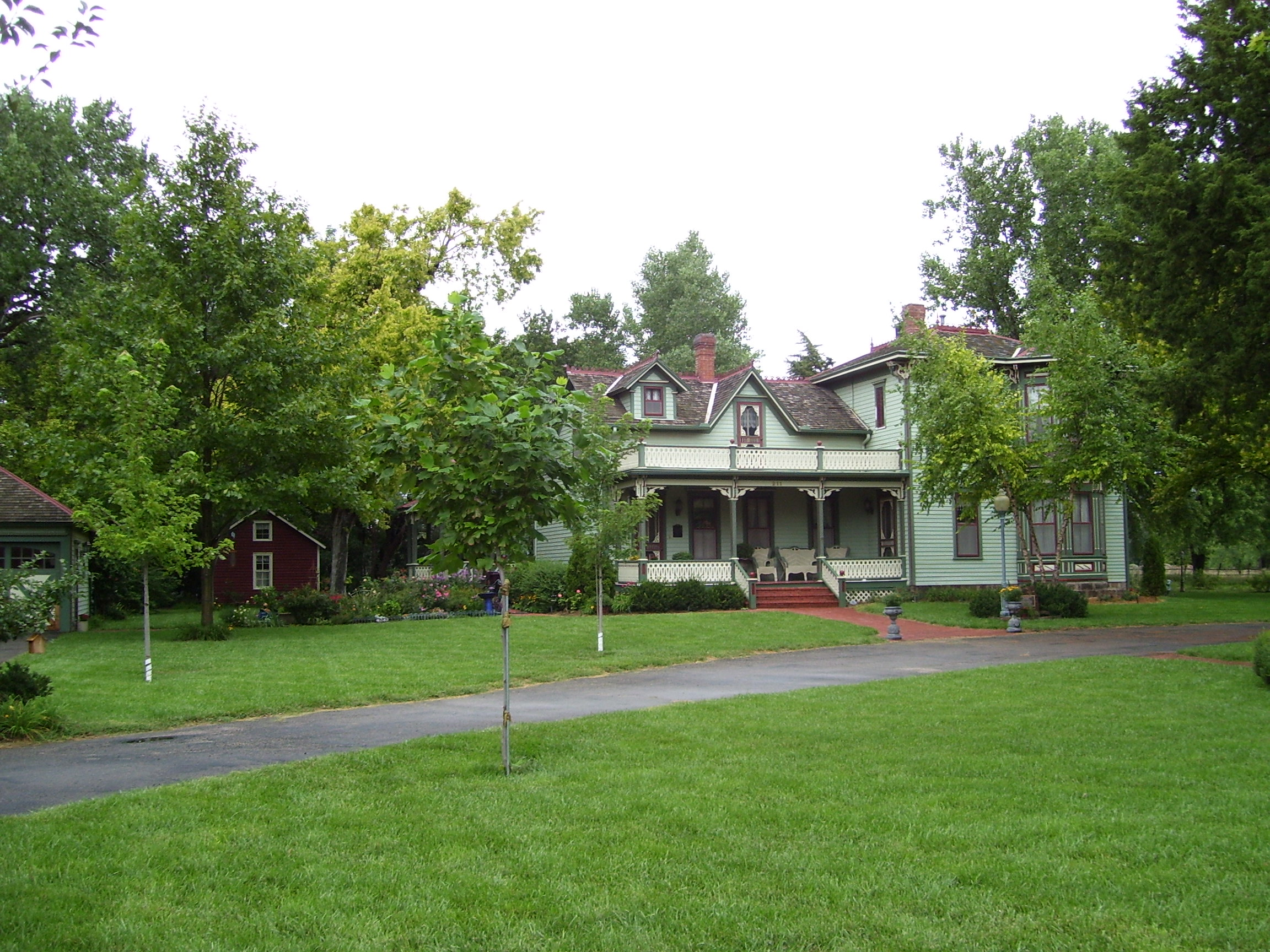
The 1888 Hans Hanson House is listed on the National Register of Historic Places

The downtown has a block of late 19th century stores that have been restored and repainted to their original colors. They are part of the Washington Street Historic District, a state historic site.

Nearby is the Hanson-Lindfors home, a sixteen-room Victorian style house built in 1888. It is named after Hans Hanson, one of the city founders, and has been restored to its original appearance and listed on the National Register of Historic Places. Located in the backyard of the home is Hanson's original 1871 wood-frame cabin, where the city charter was signed.

The downtown area includes the Range School Museum, a one-room 1906 schoolhouse moved there about eighty years later. Each spring and fall, local school children use it for a half day of class.

The Kansas Motorcycle Museum is located downtown on North Washington Street. It was founded in 2004 by National Racing Champion, "Stan the Man" Engdahl, a native of Marquette.

Ten miles away is Kanopolis State Park, the first state park of Kansas. The park, completed in 1948, includes more than 22,000 acres (89 km^{2}) of rolling hills, bluffs and woods and a 3,000 acres (12 km^{2}) lake, offering hunting, fishing, over 25 miles (40 km) of trails, and other recreational activities. Game includes pheasant, quail, prairie chickens, deer, beaver, wild turkey, squirrels, rabbits, coyotes and waterfowl; fishing for white bass and crappie is popular.

== Education ==
The community is served by Smoky Valley USD 400 public school district. The Smoky Valley High School mascot is Smoky Valley Vikings.

Marquette High School was closed through school unification in 1985. The Marquette High School mascot was Marquette Wolverines.

On June 7, 2014, the school in Marquette closed its doors for the last time, being closed due to poor funding from the school district.

== Gallery ==
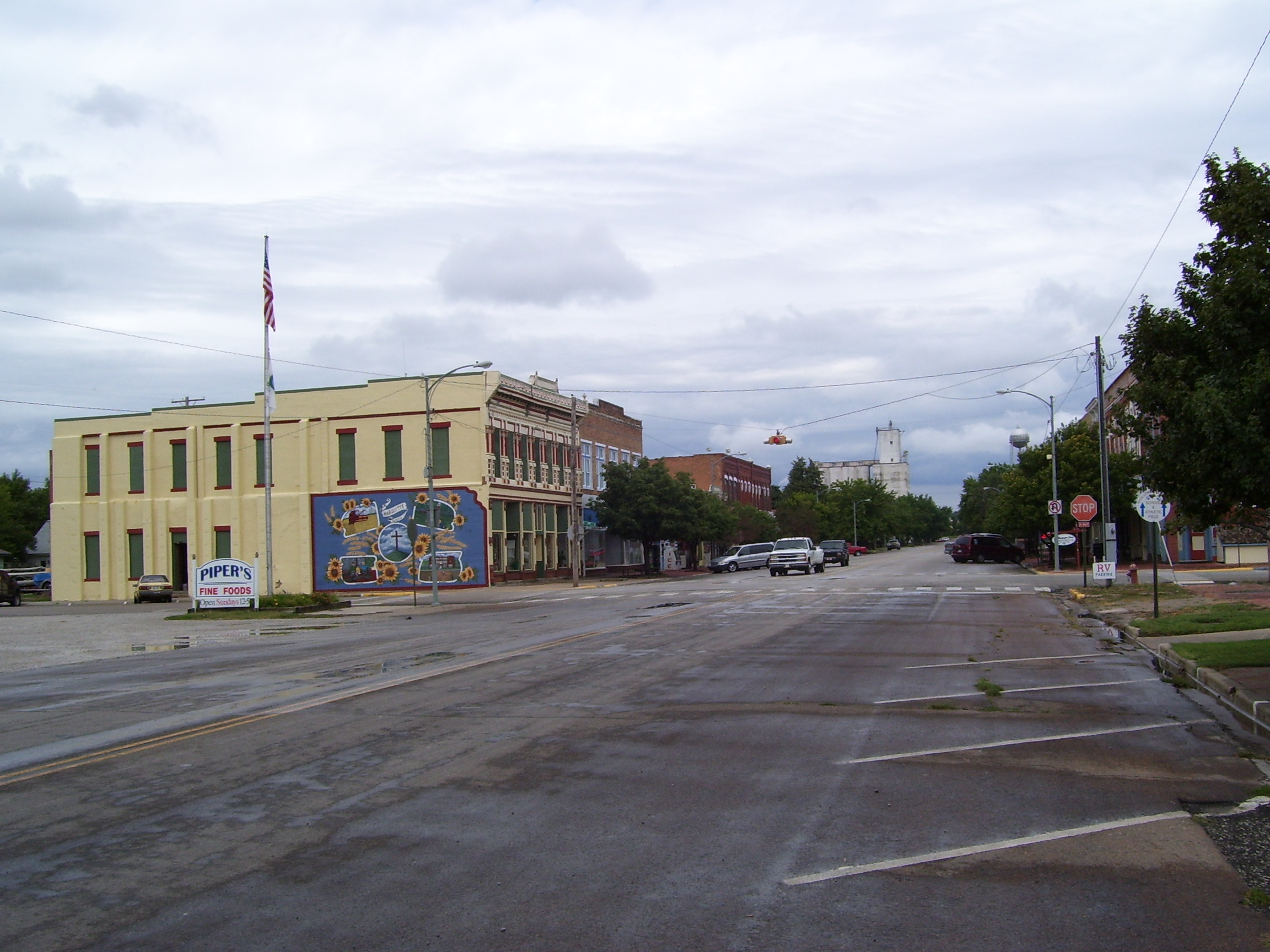
Marquette downtown block.

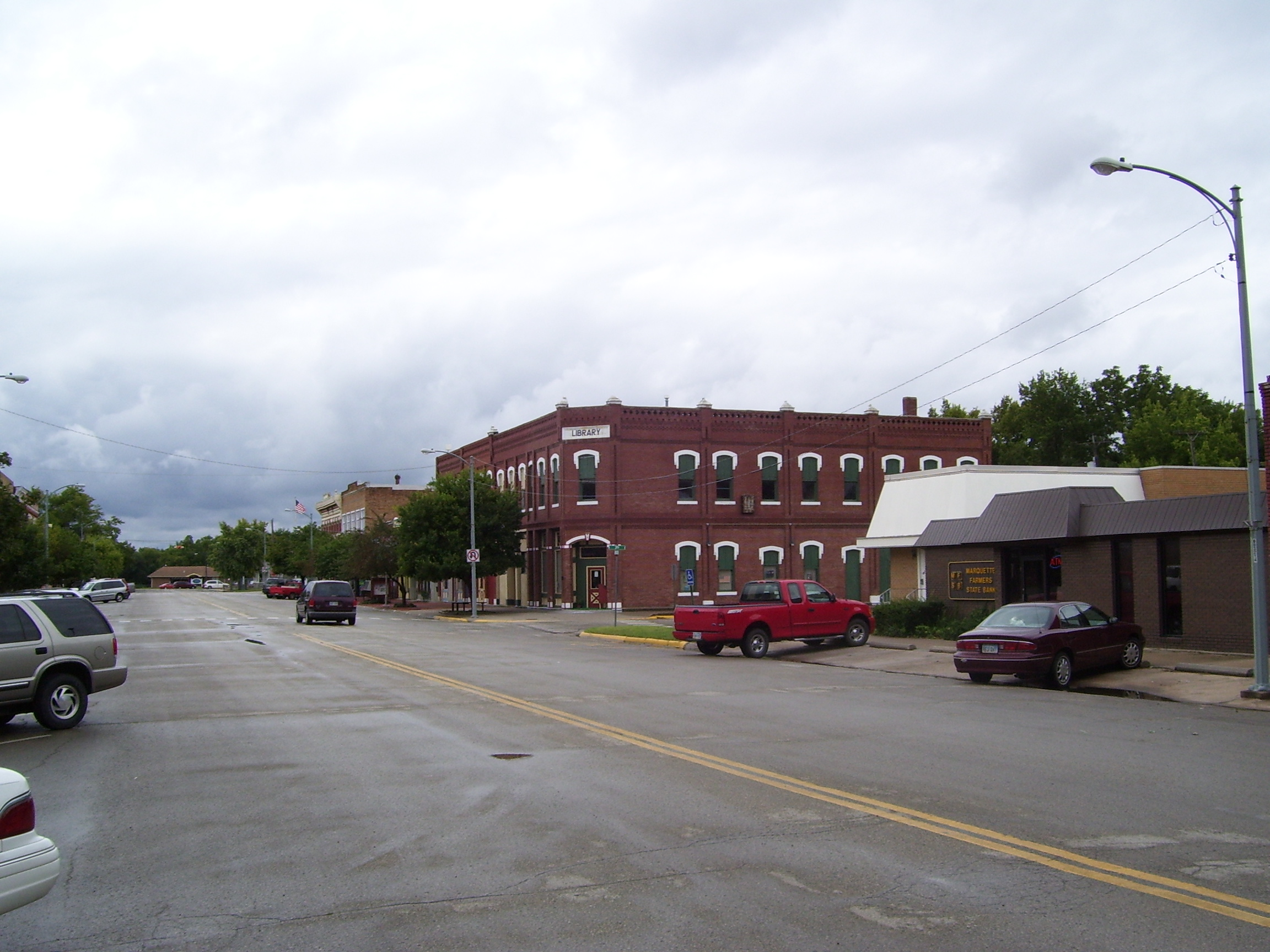
Marquette Library block and bank.

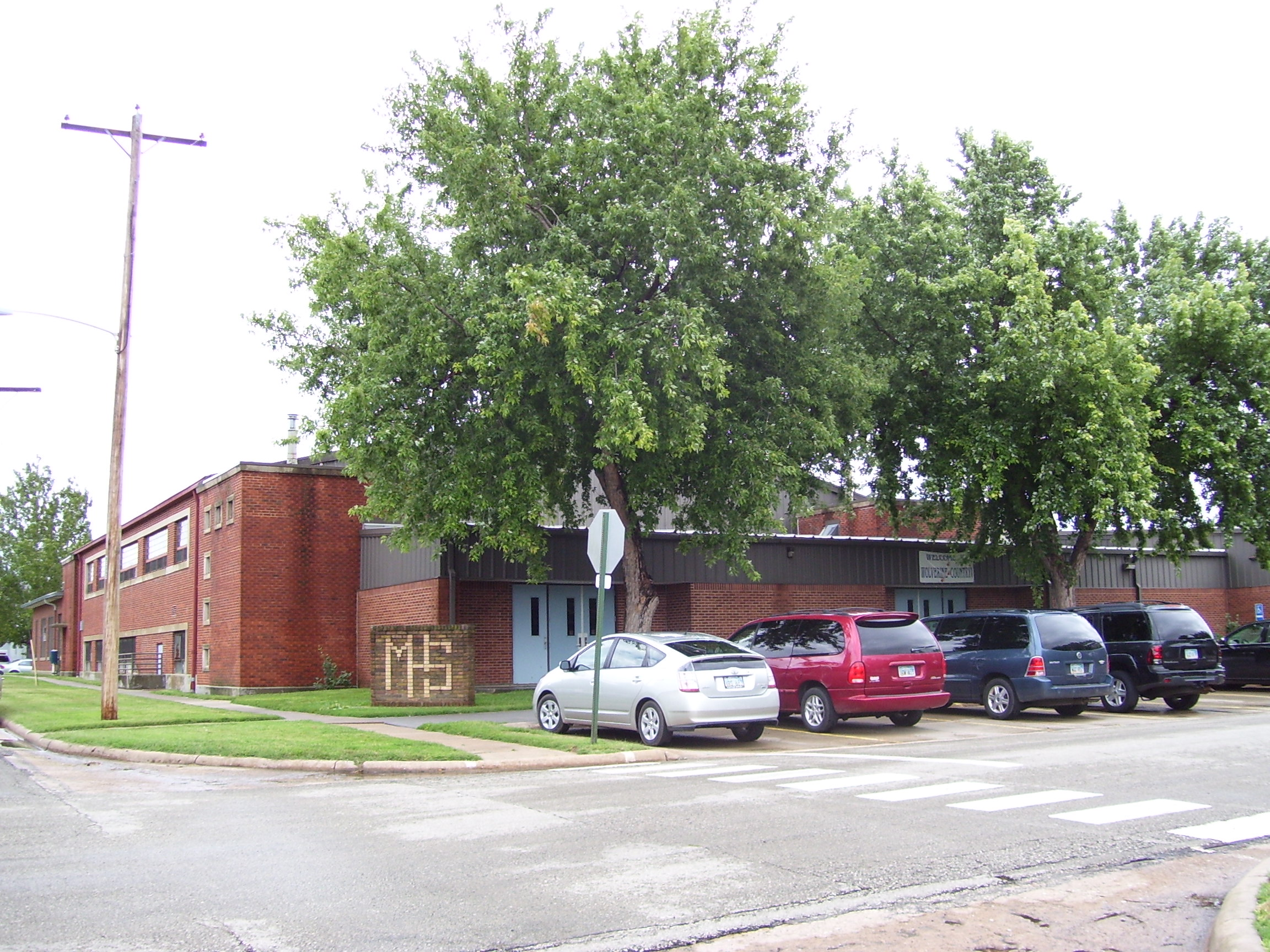
Marquette school

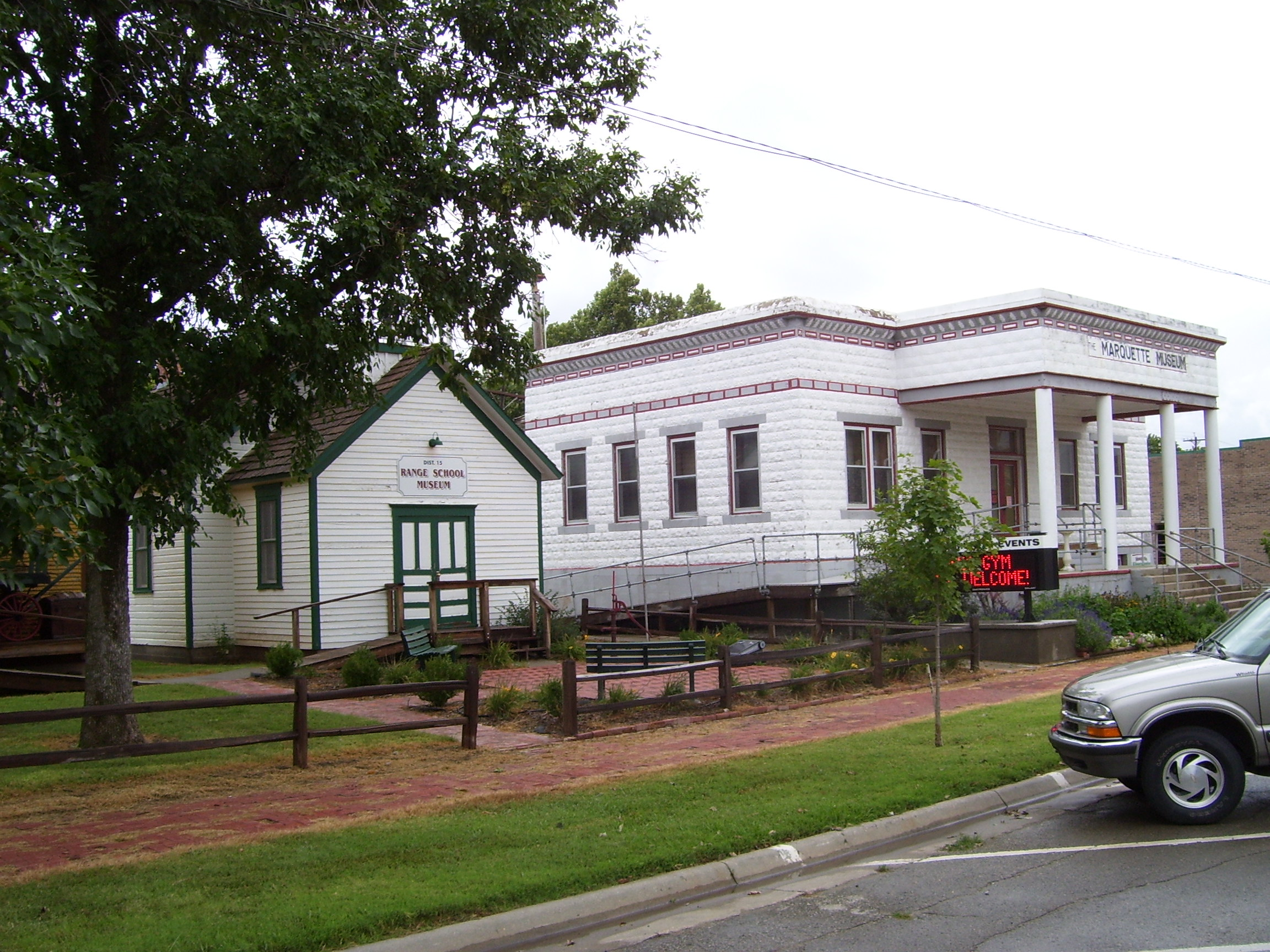
Marquette Museum and Range School museum

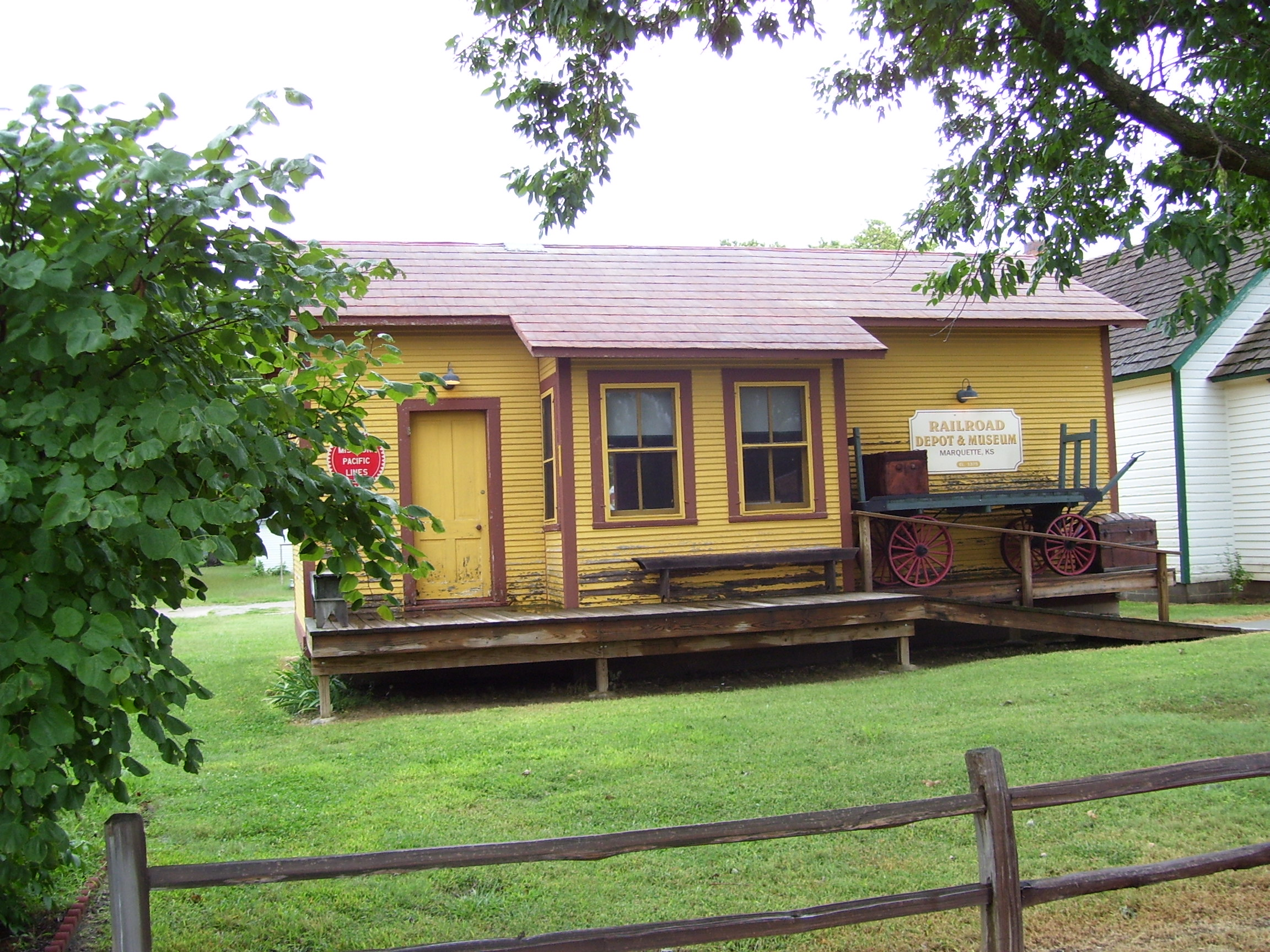
Marquette Railroad depot museum

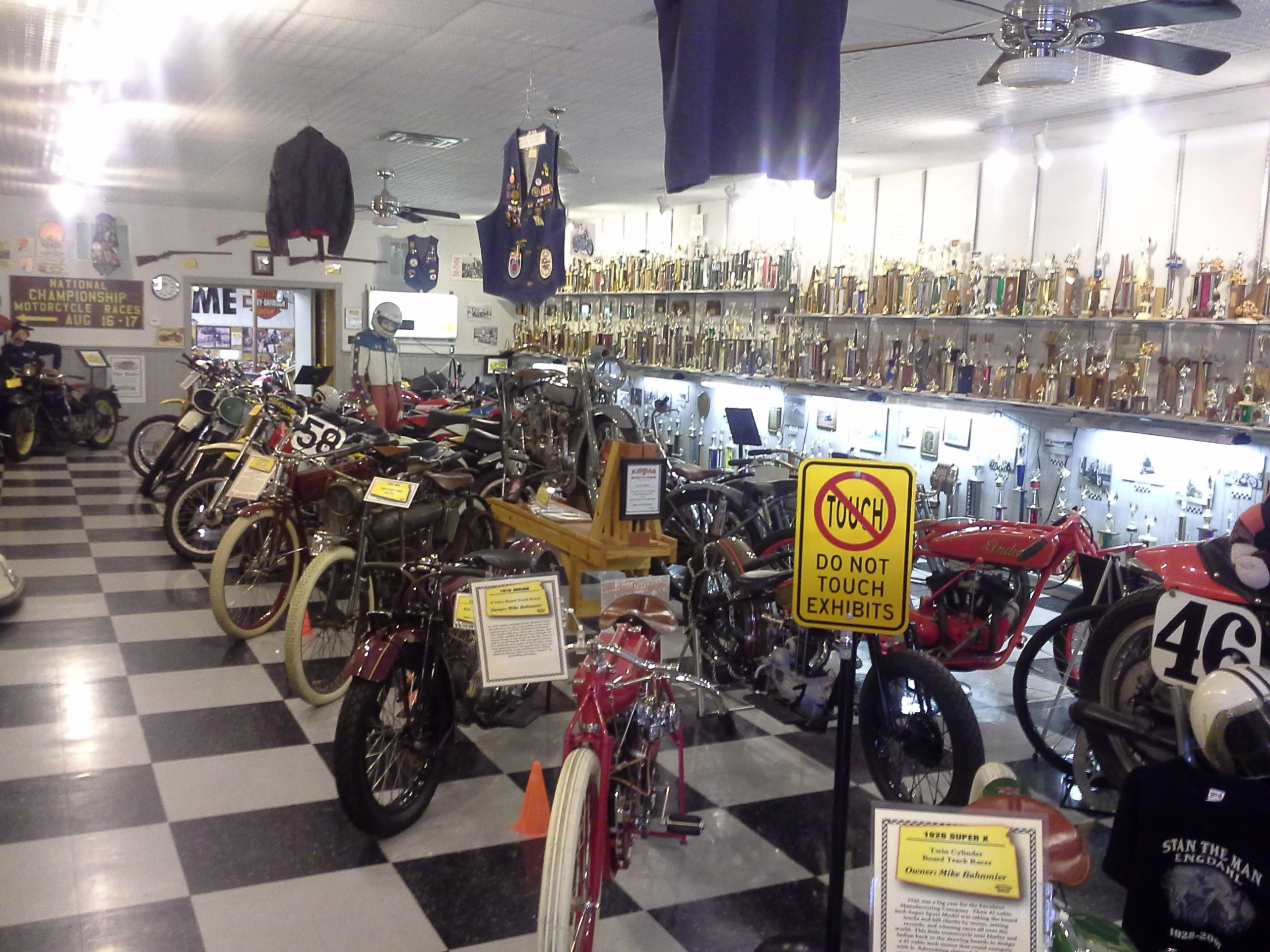
Kansas Motorcycle Museum

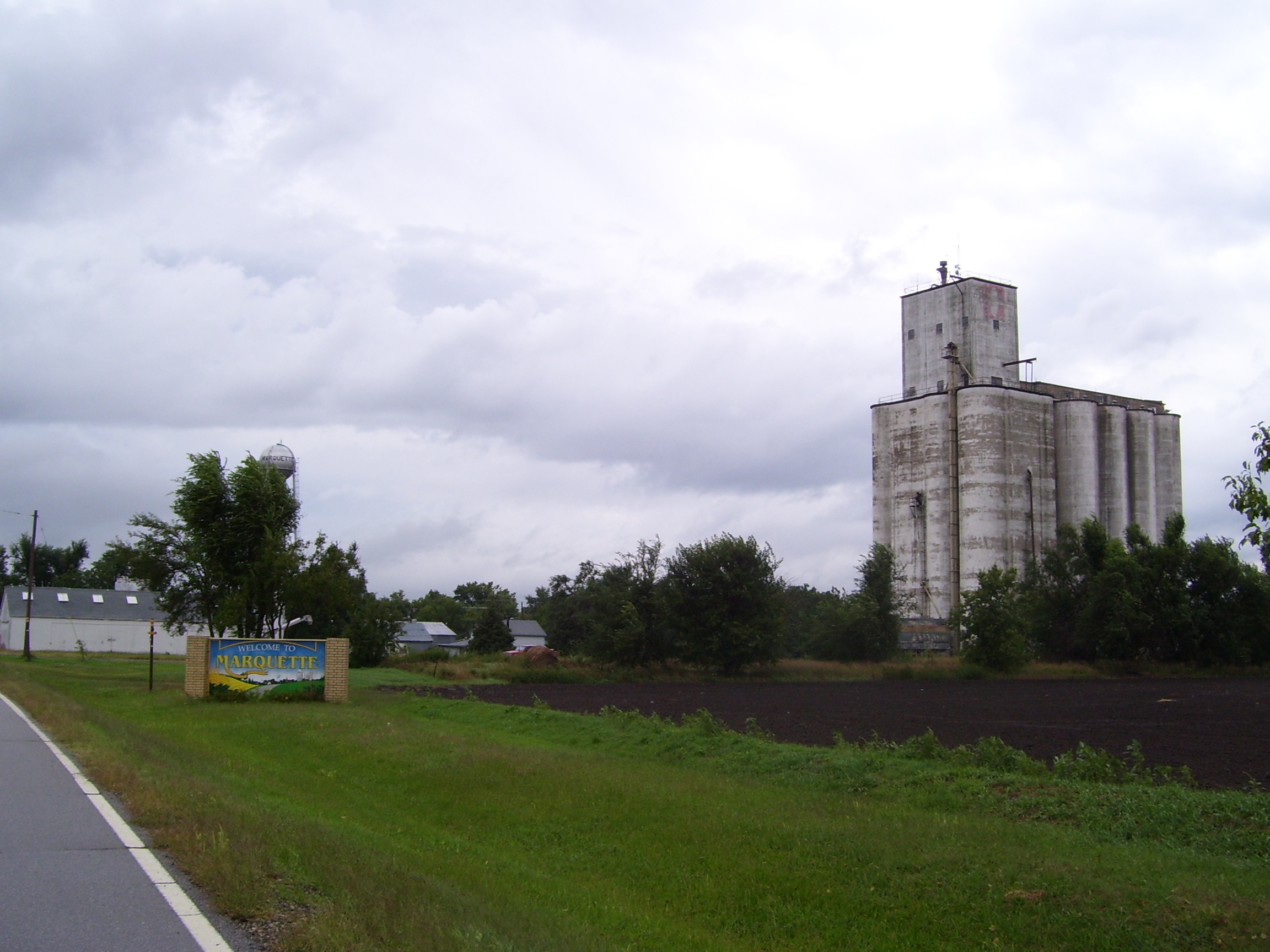
Marquette grain elevator

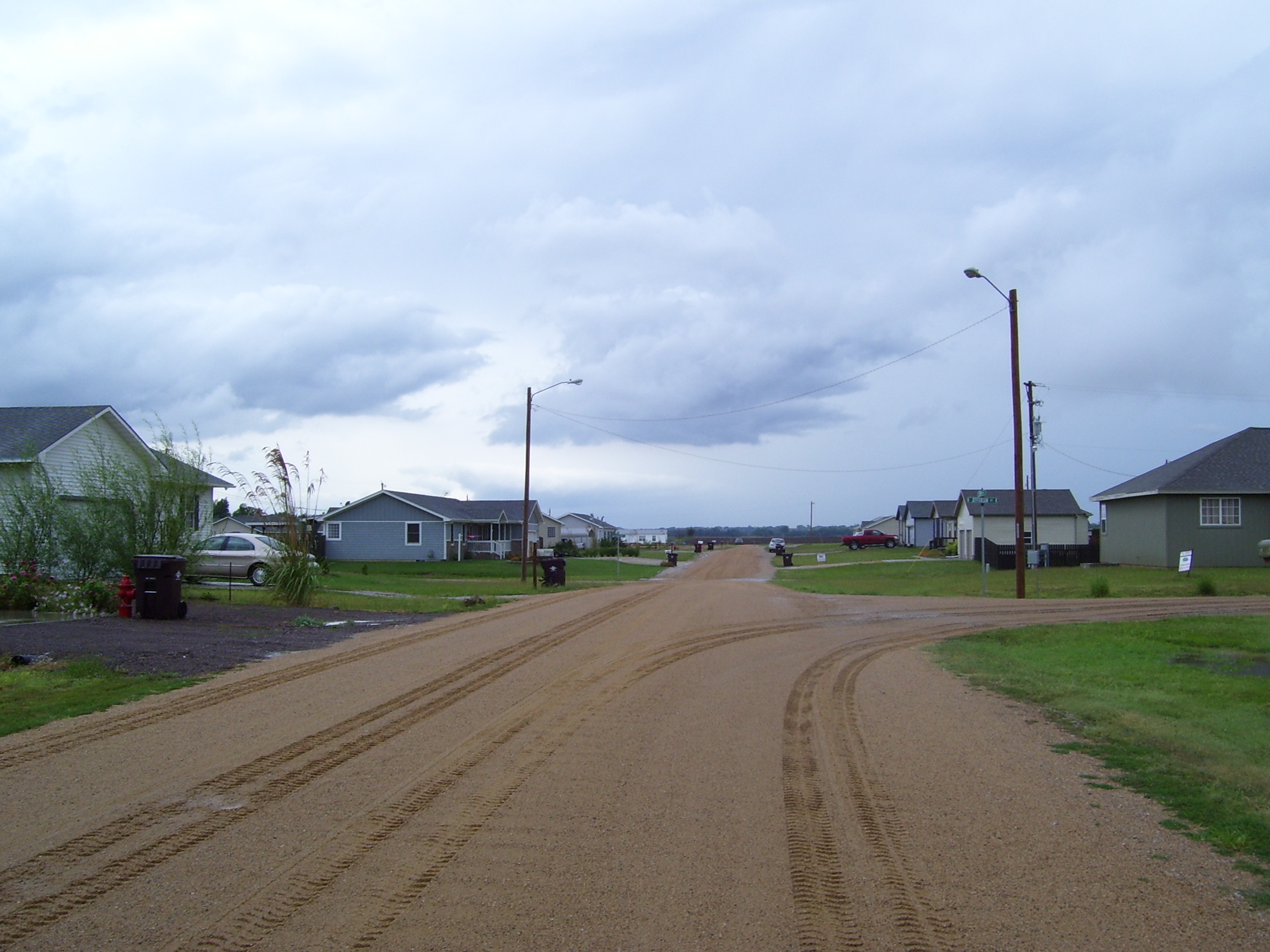
Marquette modern homesteading development

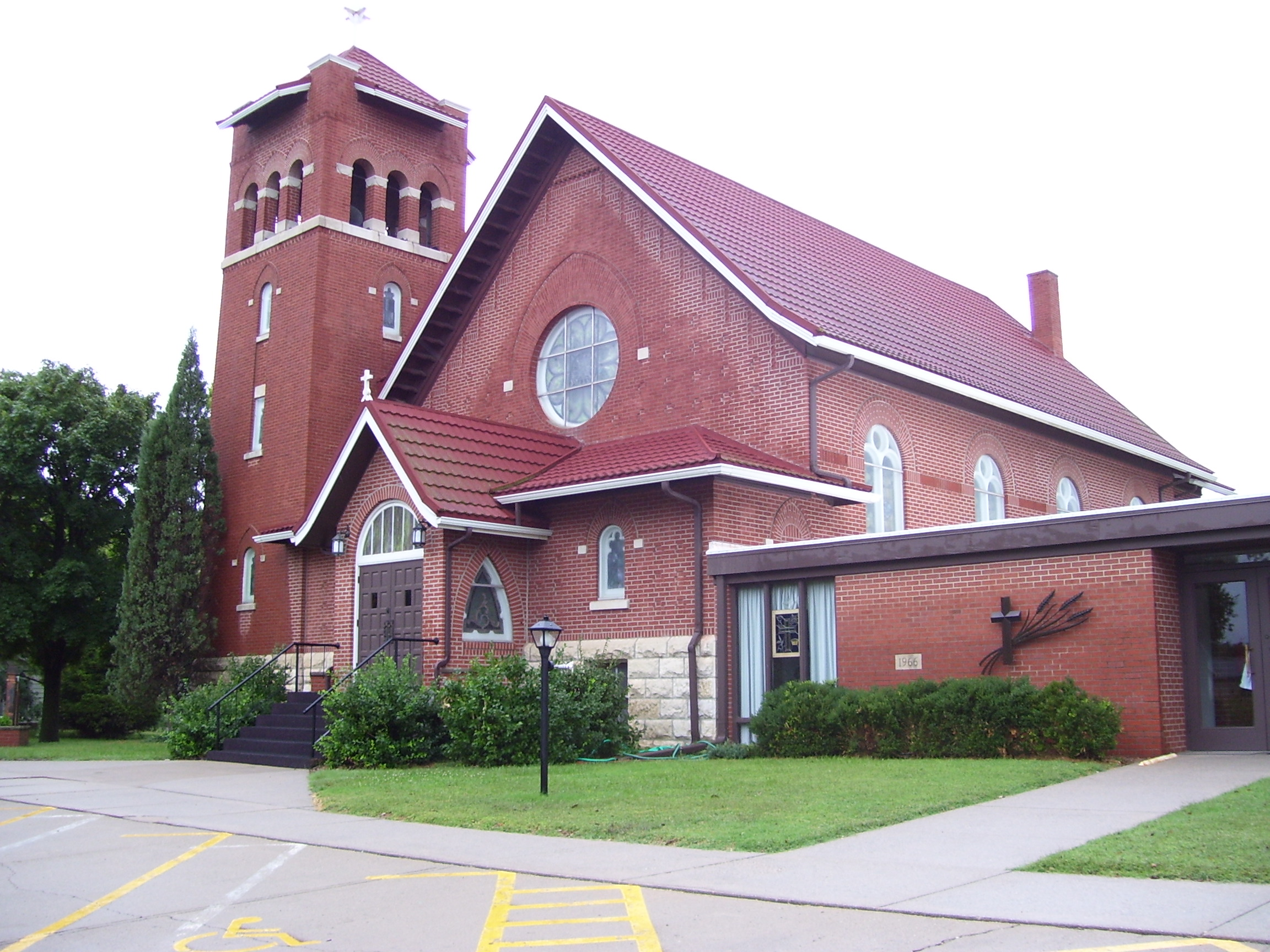
Elim Lutheran Church

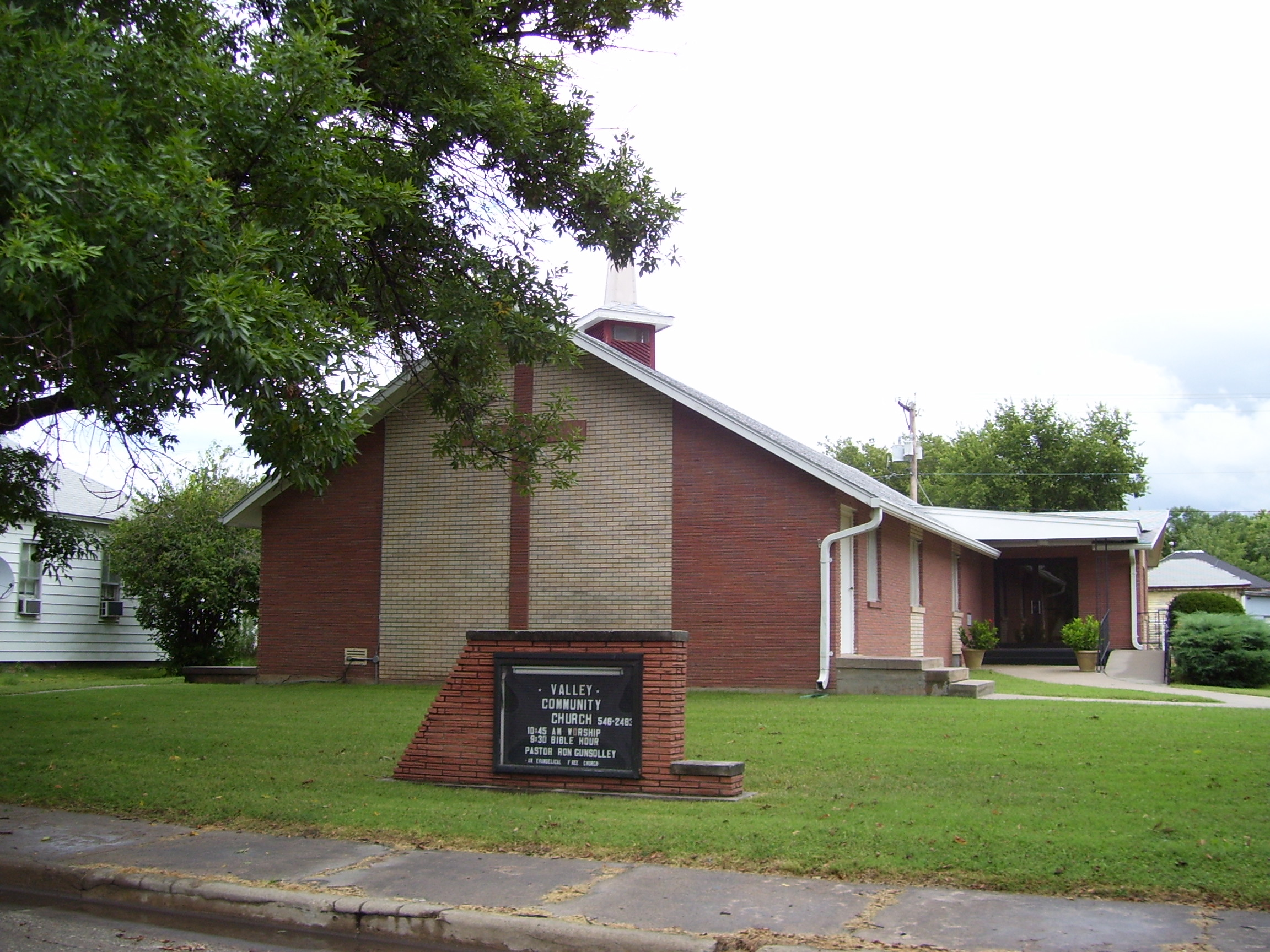
Valley Community Church

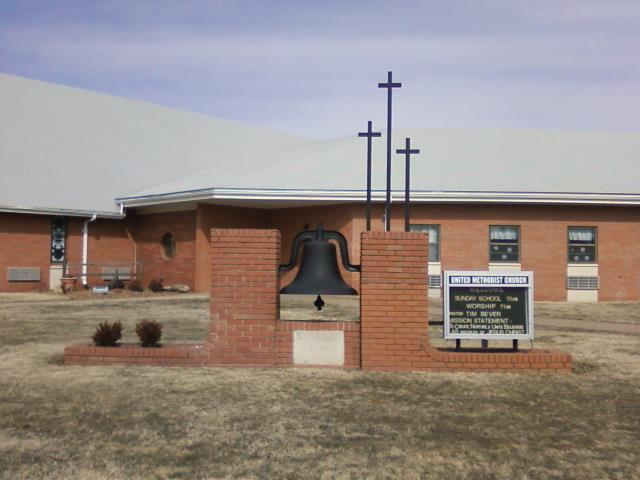
Marquette United Methodist Church

== See also ==
- List of people from McPherson County, Kansas
- National Register of Historic Places listings in McPherson County, Kansas
  - Hans Hanson House
