= Hans Hanson House =

Historic house in Kansas, United States

- U.S. National Register of Historic Places
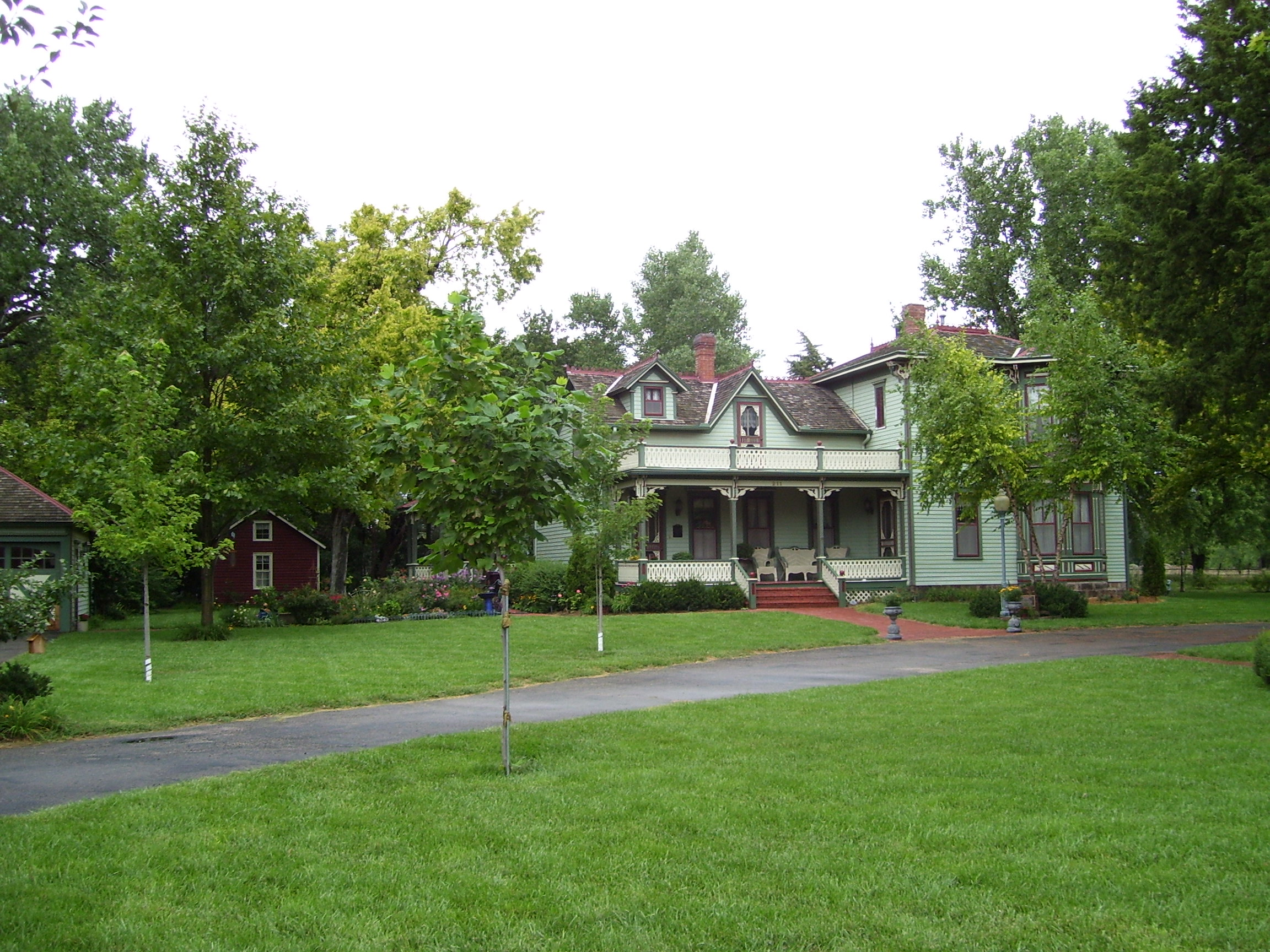

- Location within Kansas Location within the United States
- Location: 211 East 5th Street, Marquette, Kansas
- Coordinates: 38°33′24″N 97°49′54″W
- Built: 1888
- Architect: Andrew G. Logan
- Architectural style: Italianate
- NRHP reference No.: 82002665
- Added to NRHP: February 19, 1982

The Hans Hanson House, also known as the Hans-Lindfors House or Hans-Lindfors Mansion, is a historic house in Marquette, Kansas.

The 16-room Italianate house was built in 1888 by Hans Hanson, one of the founders of Town of Marquette who helped organize the Fremont Lutheran Church (1869), the first church in the Smoky Valley, and the Elim Lutheran Church in Marquette (1878). Hanson was also an early promoter and grower of broom corn.

The house also exhibits a Carpenter Gothic style, influenced by Swedish architecture. In the backyard of the home is Hanson's original 1871 wood-frame cabin, where the Marquette city charter was signed. The wood-frame cabin was originally attached to his 1869 log cabin. The houses were owned by the Hanson family for over 100 years. The Hans Hanson House has been restored to its original appearance and was added to the National Register of Historic Places in 1982.

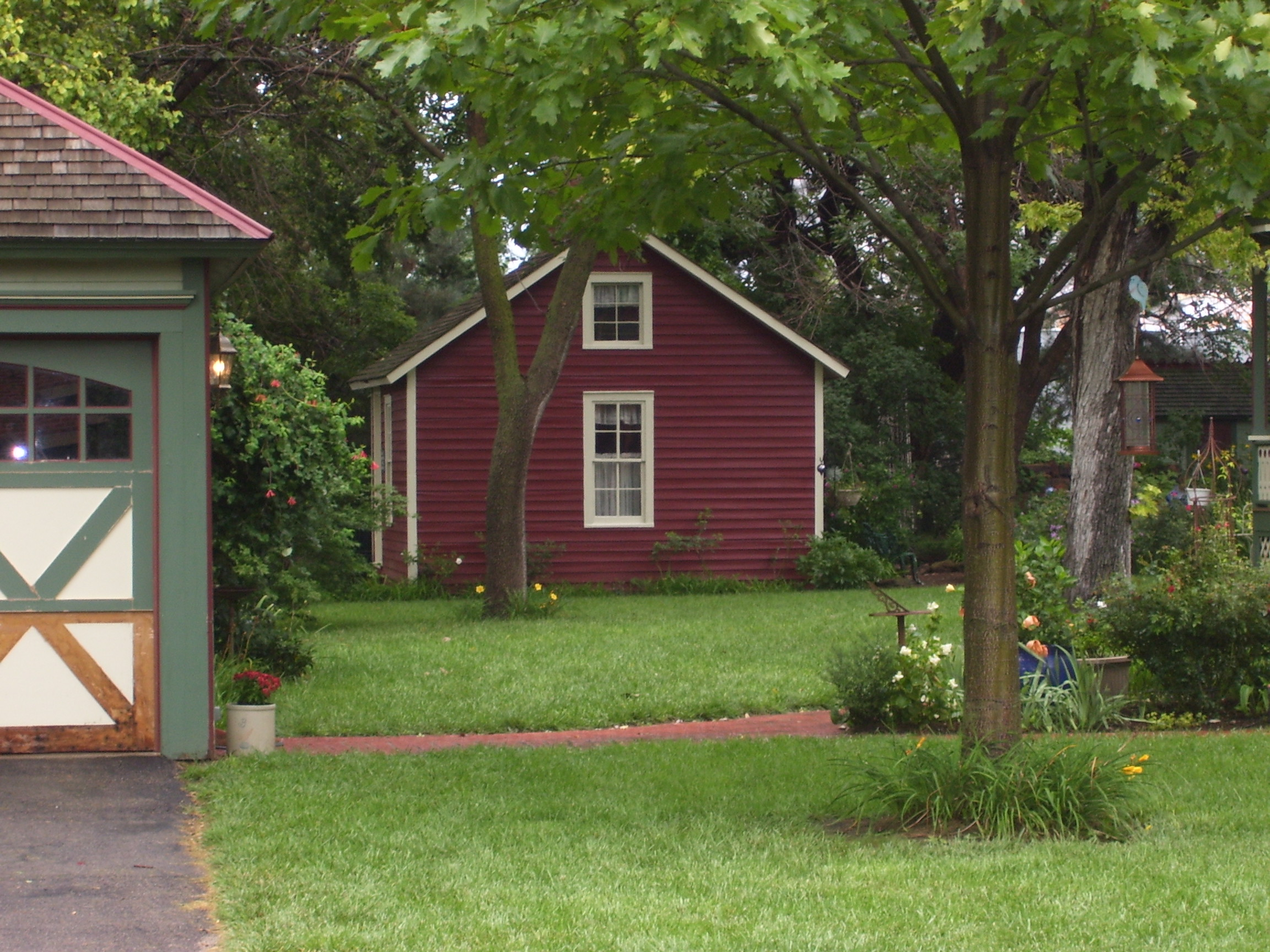
The 1871 wood-frame cabin in the front yard
