= Calvin Hall (building) =

Building at Kansas State University

Calvin Hall is a building on the campus of Kansas State University. The building was erected in 1908 and currently houses the College of Art and science.

== History ==
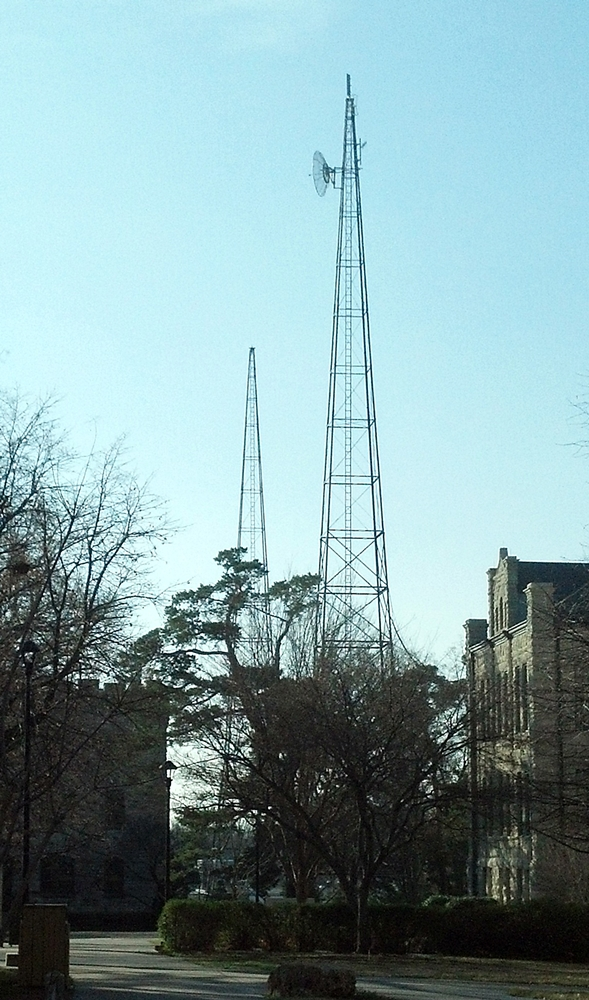
KSAC Radio Towers

Calvin Hall is named in honor of Henrietta Willard Calvin, a librarian and professor of Domestic Science. The building was originally constructed and finished in 1908 as the Domestic Science and Art Hall. The building contained the College of Home Economics. In 1959 the building began to undergo some remodeling, and the College of Home Economics moved to Justin Hall. Once the remodeling was finished, the Department of Business Administration moved in. In 1962, the Department of Business Administration was renamed the School of Commerce. A short time later, in 1963, the School of Commerce was renamed the College of Commerce. Finally, in 1970, the College of Commerce was renamed the current name, the College of Business Administration. After the construction of the new business building on K-State campus, Calvin Hall is now the home to the Deans Office of Arts and Sciences as of January 2017.

The KSAC Radio Towers, listed on the National Register of Historic Places, stretch from a few feet south of Calvin Hall to Nichols Hall.

== Uses ==
Included in the College of Business Administration are the departments of Accounting, the Finance, Management, and Marketing.

Calvin Hall is now home to a trading laboratory which allows students to "gain practical experience using state-of-the art simulation software for stock trading, applied risk management, options and futures pricing, and many other applications." The trading laboratory held its ribbon cutting on September 30, 2011. The building is also home to the Center for Economic Education, Center for Leadership, and Center for Advancement of Entrepreneurship.

== See also ==
- List of oldest buildings on Kansas colleges and universities
