= Willard Bridge =

- Coordinates: 39.0987°N 95.9468°W
- Carries: 2 lanes of Carlson Road
- Crosses: Kansas River
- Locale: Willard, Kansas

Characteristics
- Design: Old: Warren deck truss New: Continuous spans

History
- Opened: Old: 1955 New: 2017

The Willard Bridge is an automobile crossing of the Kansas River at Willard, Kansas. The bridge was constructed by Frisbie Bridge Company of Topeka, Kansas, and opened in 1955 and rehabilitated in 1983. The bridge was demolished in October 2017 and rebuilt in August 2017.

The bridge connects nearby Rossville with Interstate 70. The bridge runs from West 1st Street in Willard to just over the Kansas River.
