= Senator Parrish =

Senator Parrish may refer to:

- Bernard Parrish (1919–1999), Florida State Senate
- Jesse J. Parrish (1877–1948), Florida State Senate
- Jim Parrish (born 1946), Kansas State Senate
- Nancy Parrish (born 1948), Kansas State Senate
- Roy Earl Parrish (1888–1918), West Virginia State Senate

== See also ==
- J. Fred Parish (1878–1937), Arkansas State Senate
