= Washburn Rural High School =

Location
- 5900 SW 61st Street; Topeka, Kansas 66619; United States; 38.957267°N 95.759962°W

Information
- School type: Public, High School
- Established: 1918; 108 years ago (Washburn High School)
- School district: Auburn–Washburn USD 437
- CEEB code: 172930
- NCES School ID: 200320001073
- Principal: Ed Raines
- Athletic Director: Charlie Nimz
- Teaching staff: 130.03 (on FTE basis)
- Grades: 9–12
- Gender: coed
- Enrollment: 1,885 (2023-2024)
- Average class size: 15
- Student to teacher ratio: 14.50 (2024-2025)
- Hours in school day: 7.12 (6.72 on Wednesdays)
- Campus size: 125.05 ac (506,041.08 m²)
- Area: 7.82 ac (31,665.1 m²)
- Campus type: Rural
- Colors: Blue; White; Gold
- Song: Washburn Rural Alma Mater
- Fight song: Washburn Rural Fight Song
- Athletics: Class 6A
- Athletics conference: Centennial League
- Mascot: Junior Blue
- Team name: The Junior Blues
- Rival: Shawnee Heights High School; Hayden High School; Emporia High School
- Newspaper: The Blue Streak
- Yearbook: The Chimes
- Communities served: Topeka, Auburn, Pauline, Montara Village
- Website: www.wrhs.net

Washburn Rural High School is a public high school located in southwest Topeka, Kansas, operated by Auburn–Washburn USD 437, and serves students in grades 9–12. The school is next to Washburn Rural Middle School. In 2007, Edward Raines became the new principal. The "Junior Blue" is the School mascot with the school colors being blue and white. The average annual enrollment is approximately 1,900 students.

Washburn Rural is a member of the Kansas State High School Activities Association and offers a variety of sports programs. Athletic teams compete in the 6A division and are known as the "Junior Blues". Extracurricular activities are also offered in the form of performing arts, school publications, and clubs.

== Extracurricular activities ==
The Junior Blues are classified as a 6A school, the largest classification in Kansas according to the Kansas State High School Activities Association. Throughout its history, Washburn Rural has won 34 state championships in various sports. Many graduates have gone on to participate in collegiate athletics.

=== Athletics ===
==== Football ====
The football program won the state championship in 1985 and again in 1986 and 1989 under then head coach, Ron Bowen, who has since been inducted into the KSHSAA Hall of Fame. The football stadium at the school, Bowen-Glaze Stadium, is named after coaches Ron Bowen and Ray Glaze. On February 13, 2013, it was announced Steve Buhler would become the head football coach after spending 15 seasons at Rossville High School. Included All league line backer Nathan Gentine of the 2018 season

==== Men's Rowing ====
In 2006, the Washburn Rural boy's rowing team was ranked 4th in the state in their inaugural season. The following year they won the 2007 state championship and since have received national recognition. However, there is no longer a rowing program at the school.

==== Volleyball ====
In 2009, the Washburn Rural volleyball team was league, sub-state, and state champions. That year, the volleyball team qualified for the state tournament for the thirteenth year in a row, winning the league tournament for the sixth year in a row, the longest such streak in league history.

==== Cross country ====
In 2008, Avery Clifton, class of 2010, won the state championship with a time of 14:59.91 seconds in the 4000 meter race, and won again 2009.

In 2010, Jacob Morgan, class of 2012, won the state championship with a time of 15:35.40 seconds in the 5000 meter race. Jacob successfully defended his state title in 2011, with a time of 15:28.50.

The Washburn Rural boys cross country team has won two Kansas Class 6A state championships, capturing titles in 2019 and 2025. The 2019 championship was the first boys cross country state title in school history.

The boys team currently holds the longest consecutive winning streak of the Topeka City Championships, winning 19 straight titles from 2007 through 2025.

The boys program founded the Blue Jeans Mile in 2016, establishing the original running event in which competitors race one mile while wearing blue jeans. Washburn Rural runner Pierce Flanders established the event's original world record of 4:36 in 2016 and lowered his own record to 4:32 in 2017.

==== Boys' Basketball ====
The boys' basketball program has also experienced a fair amount of success, winning state titles in 1966, 1982, 1985 and 2011. The 2010-2011 team captured the school's first league title in 14 years.

==== Other sports ====
In 1981, Dana Hazen broke the state record javelin throw at the Kansas Relays. The girls' basketball team has won three titles, occurring in 1996, 1999, and 2009 under the leadership of Bill Annan. In July 2009, Bill Annan joined the Oklahoma State women's basketball team as director of player development, leaving the head coaching position to Kevin Bordewick. The boys' soccer team, under Brian Hensyel, claimed the 6A boys' soccer state championship in a 3–0 win over Lawrence Free State High School. The team finished the season 20–1, and was ranked in several national polls.

=== State Championships ===
State Championships
Season	Sport	Number of Championships	Year
Fall	Football	3	1985, 1986, 1989
Fall	Soccer, Boys	3	2002, 2009, 2012
Fall	Volleyball	7	2004, 2006, 2007, 2008, 2009, 2011, 2012
Fall	Tennis, Girls	2	1990, 1993
Fall	Cross Country, Girls	1	1996
Fall	Golf, Girls	5	2005, 2013, 2014, 2016, 2017
Winter	Basketball, Boys	4	1966, 1982, 1985, 2011
Winter	Basketball, Girls	4	1996, 1999, 2009, 2019
Winter	Wrestling, Boys	2	2021, 2022
Winter	Wrestling, Girls	2	2020, 2021
Spring	Golf, Boys	3	1997, 2009, 2015
Spring	Tennis, Boys	5	1988, 2003, 2004, 2005, 2007
Spring	Baseball	2	1950, 1952
Spring	Softball	3	1995, 2008, 2014
Total		46	

=== JROTC ===
WRHS has an Air Force Junior Reserve Officer Training Corps (AFJROTC) unit. The KS71ST AFJROTC, was first established at the school in August 1972, and ran through May 1975. The KS71st graduated it first cadets in 1973. The last KS71ST cadets were graduated in May 1975. Due to the drawdown of United States Air Force forces after Vietnam, and the closure of Forbes Air Force Base, in Topeka, Kansas the unit was discontinued. A new unit was established in 2013. The objectives of AFJROTC are to educate and train high school cadets in citizenship, promote community service, instill responsibility, character, and self-discipline, while providing instruction in air and space fundamentals. Classroom instruction is reinforced by community service, field trips and other training opportunities. Students participating in AFJROTC are not required to serve in the military and receive physical education and history elective credit for taking AFJROTC courses. There are approximately 120 cadets in the program.

== Notable alumni ==
- Ken Berry, former MLB player for the Chicago White Sox, California Angels, Milwaukee Brewers, and Cleveland Indians
- Gregg Binkley, actor
- Aaron Crow, 12th overall pick by the Kansas City Royals in the 2009 MLB draft, traded to Miami Marlins in 2014
- Branden Dozier, professional football player with the Calgary Stampeders
- Grant Hinkle, winner of the 2008 World Series of Poker (WSOP) $1,500 No-Limit Hold'em event
- Kris Kobach, Kansas Secretary of State
- Jeff Kready, Broadway actor
- Trey Lewis, former NFL player for the Atlanta Falcons
- Andy Mckee, professional fingerstyle guitarist
- James McClinton, former Mayor of Topeka

== See also ==
- List of high schools in Kansas
- List of unified school districts in Kansas
