= Topeka Boulevard Bridge =

- Coordinates: 39.0642°N 95.6743°W
- Carries: 4 lanes of Topeka Boulevard
- Crosses: Kansas River
- Locale: Downtown Topeka, Kansas

Characteristics
- Design: Unknown

Location
- Interactive map of Topeka Boulevard Bridge

The Topeka Boulevard Bridge is a four-lane automobile and pedestrian crossing of the Kansas River at Topeka, Kansas, United States. A complete rebuilding of the bridge took place from 2006 to 2008, in which guarded walkways for pedestrians were added, as well as various aesthetic amenities, like a clock. The bridge spans the Kansas River from West 1st Avenue to NW Gordon Street.
