= Watson, Kansas =

Unincorporated community in Shawnee County, Kansas

- Unincorporated community
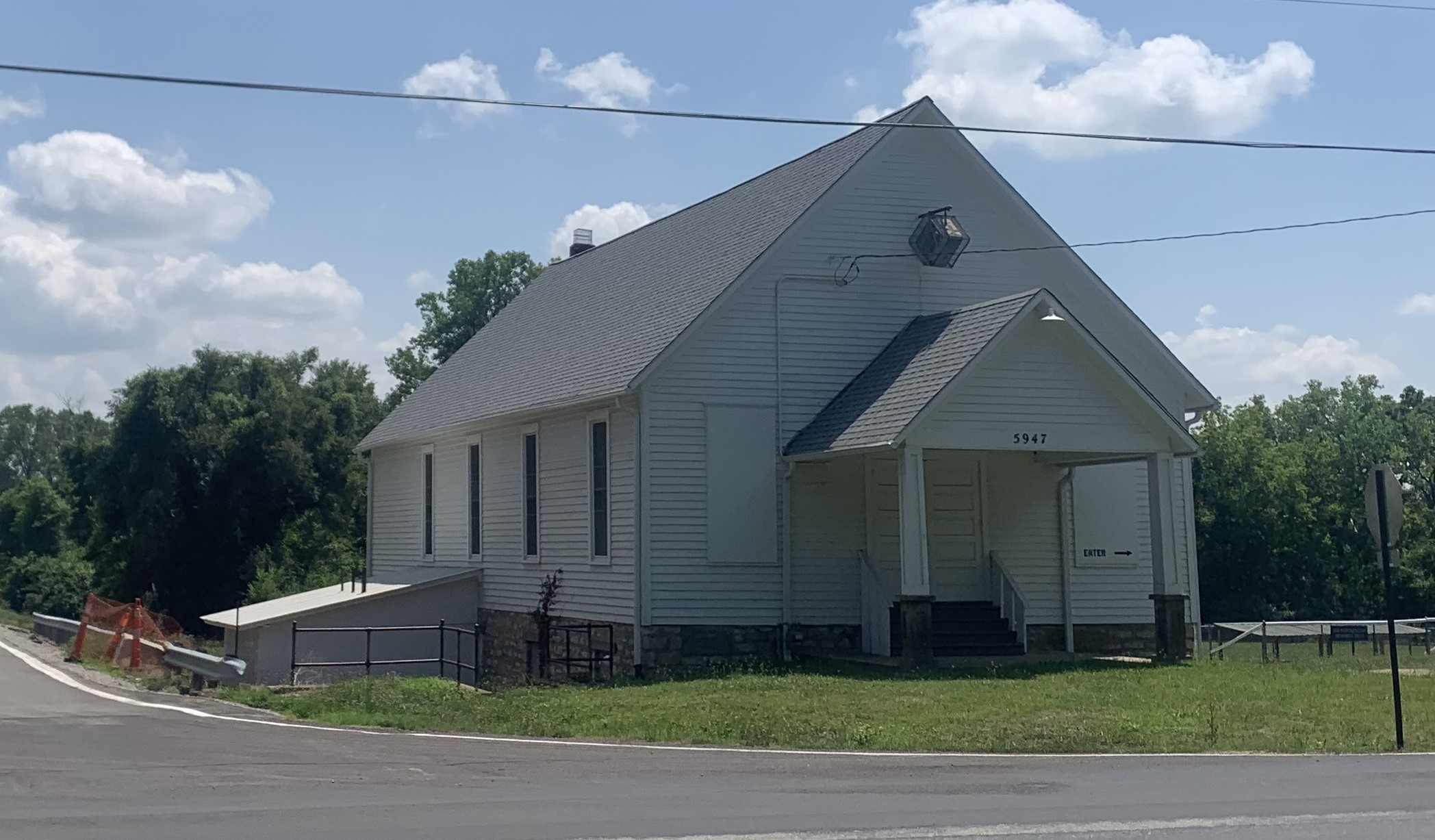
- Albert Neese Masonic Lodge (2025)

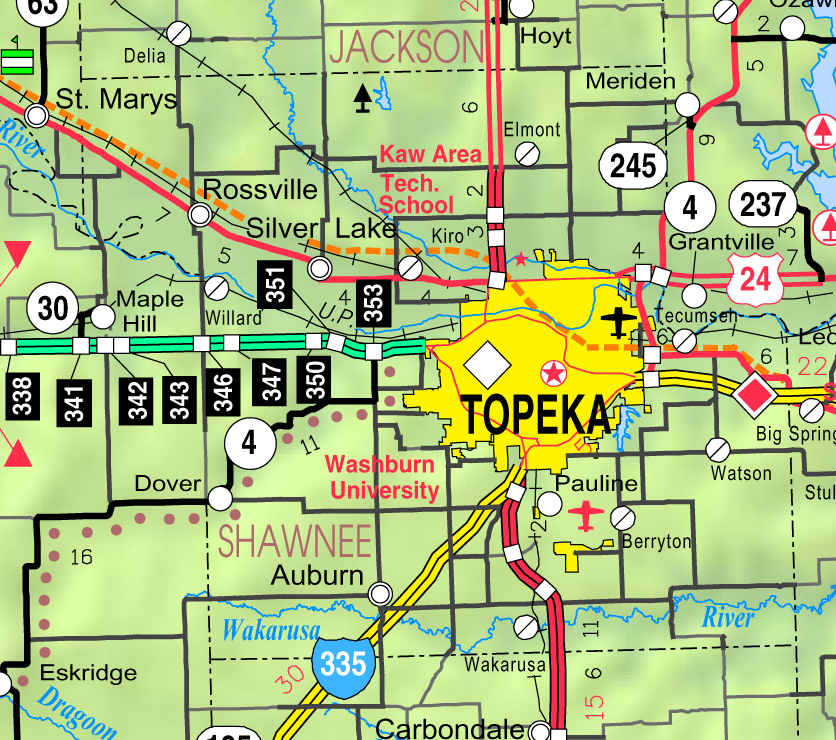
- KDOT map of Shawnee County (legend)

- Location within Kansas Location within the United States
- Coordinates: 38°59′17″N 95°33′23″W
- Country: United States
- State: Kansas
- County: Shawnee
- Township: Monmouth
- Elevation: 1,083 ft (330 m)
- Time zone: UTC-6 (CST)
  - Summer (DST): UTC-5 (CDT)
- Area code: 785
- FIPS code: 20-76010
- GNIS ID: 479095

Watson is an unincorporated community in Shawnee County, Kansas, United States.

== Demographics ==
Watson is part of the Topeka, Kansas Metropolitan Statistical Area.

== Education ==
The community is served by Shawnee Heights USD 450 public school district, and two schools are located in Watson: Shawnee Heights High School and Shawnee Highs Middle School.
