= Montara =

Montara may refer to:

- Montara, California
  - Montara State Beach
- Montara, Kansas
- Montara Mountain
- Montara oil spill
- Montara (album), an album by Bobby Hutcherson
