= Tom West (Kansas politician) =

American politician (1925–1975)

Member of the Kansas Senate from the 19th district
- In office January 1973 – September 20, 1973
- Succeeded by: Dana Killinger

Member of the Kansas Senate from the 13th district
- In office 1969–1972

Member of the Kansas House of Representatives from the 46th district
- In office 1967–1968

Personal details
- Born: June 10, 1925 Topeka, Kansas
- Died: January 19, 1975 Topeka, Kansas
- Party: Republican
- Spouse: Delores Hunt (m. 1946)

Thomas James West (June 10, 1925–January 19, 1975) was an American politician who served in the Kansas State Senate and Kansas House of Representatives as a Republican during the 1960s and 1970s. He was originally elected to the Kansas House in 1966, serving one term there before running for the Kansas Senate. He won election to the Senate in 1968 and won re-election in 1972 before resigning from the Senate on September 20, 1973. After his resignation, he was succeeded by Dana Killinger.

== Personal Life and Death ==
Tom West worked at Highland Park High School starting in around 1950, and worked as a teacher and administrator. He died on January 19, 1975 of cancer.
