= Auburn–Washburn USD 437 =

Public school district in Topeka, Kansas

Address
- 5928 SW 53rd St. Topeka, Kansas, 66610; United States
- Coordinates: 38°58′19″N 95°45′37″W

District information
- Type: Public
- Grades: PreK to 12
- Established: 1966
- Superintendent: Scott McWilliams
- Schools: 10
- NCES District ID: 2003200

Students and staff
- Students: around 6,000 (2024-25)
- Teachers: 443.3
- Student–teacher ratio: 13:1
- Athletic conference: Centennial League
- Colors: Blue; White

Other information
- Website: usd437.net

Auburn–Washburn USD 437 is a public unified school district headquartered in Topeka, Kansas, United States. It serves Southern and Southwestern Shawnee County, as well as a small portion of extreme northern Osage County. It serves Southwestern and Western portions of the city of Topeka, as well as the communities of Pauline, Montara, Auburn, and Wakarusa.

== History ==
The district was established in 1966 as "Unified School District 437". As of August 2017, Auburn–Washburn School District is under the administration of Superintendent Scott McWilliams.

== Schools ==
The school district operates the following schools:

High school

- Washburn Rural High School.

Middle school

- Washburn Rural Middle School.
- Washburn Rural North Middle School.

Elementary schools

- Auburn Elementary, Auburn
- Farley Elementary, Topeka
- Indian Hills Elementary, Topeka
- Jay Shideler Elementary, Topeka
- Pauline Central Primary, Pauline/Montara Village
- Pauline South Intermediate, Pauline/Montara Village
- Wanamaker Elementary, Topeka

== See also ==
- List of high schools in Kansas
- List of unified school districts in Kansas

Topeka is served by four public school districts, including:

- Seaman USD 345 (serving North Topeka)
- Auburn–Washburn USD 437 (serving west and southwest Topeka)
- Shawnee Heights USD 450 (serving extreme east and southeast Topeka)
- Topeka USD 501 (serving inner-city Topeka)
