= Berryton, Kansas =

Unincorporated community in Shawnee County, Kansas

- Unincorporated community
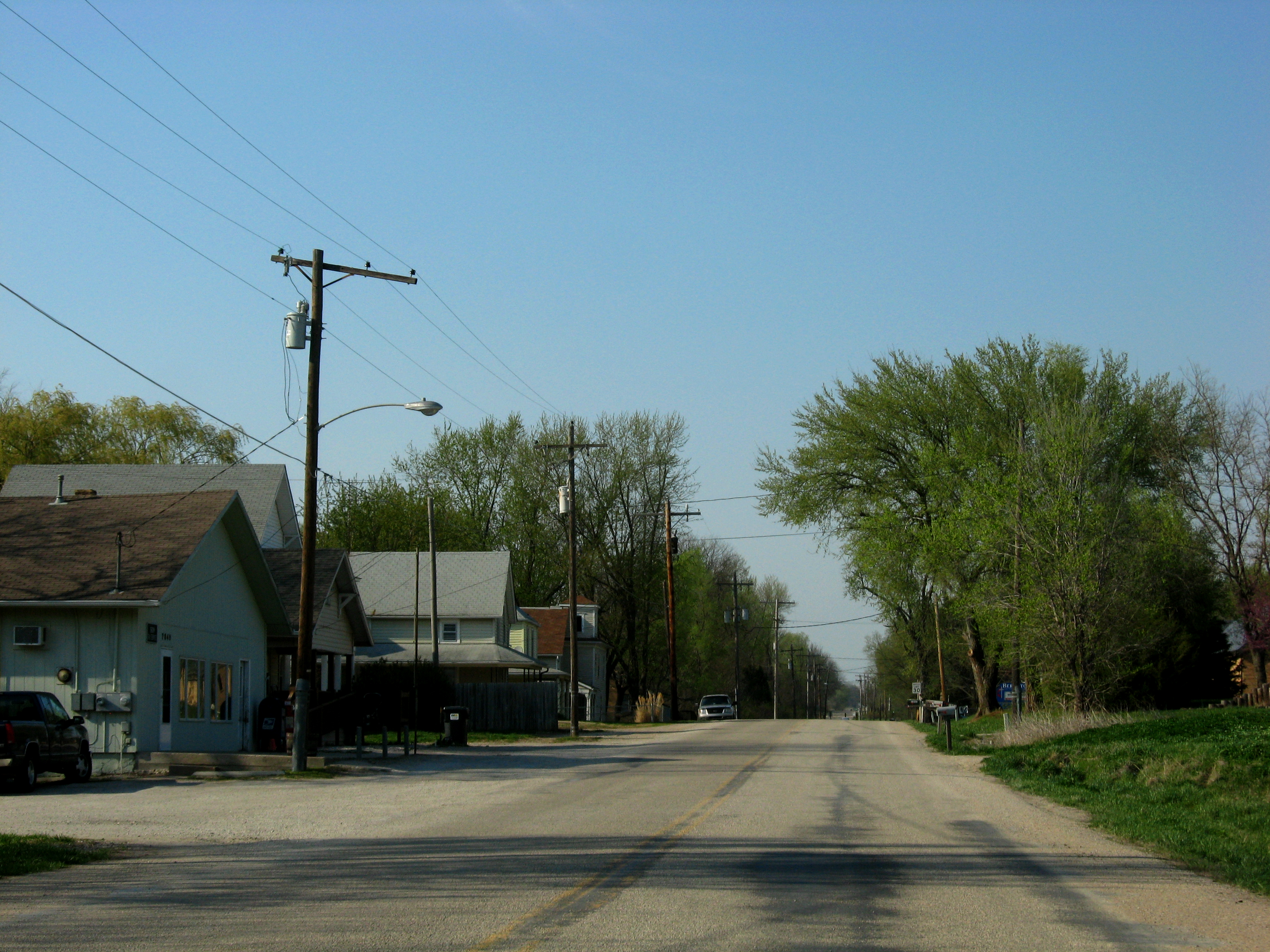
- Berryton (2010)

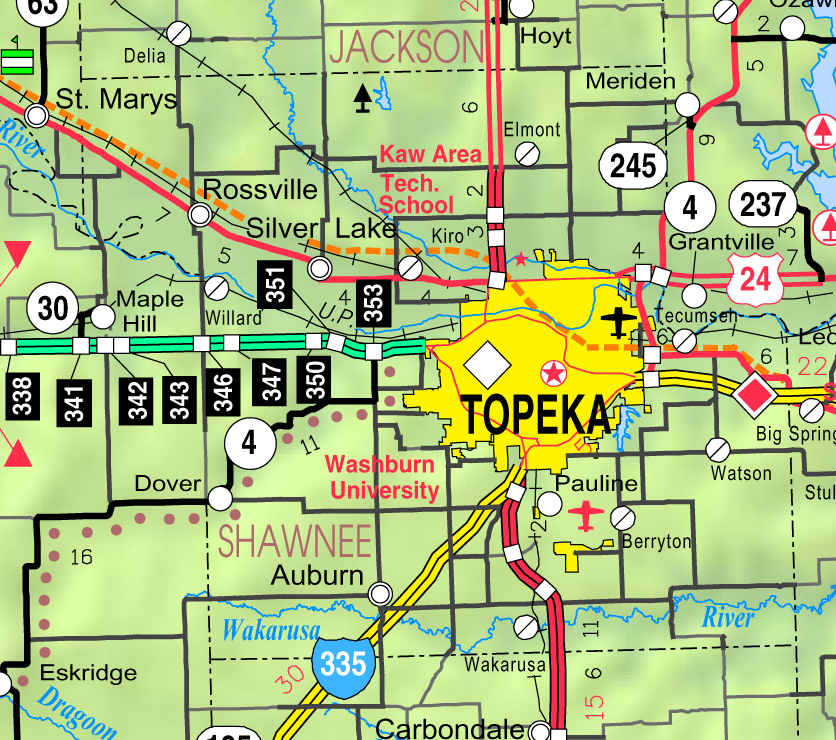
- KDOT map of Shawnee County (legend)

- Location within Kansas Location within the United States
- Coordinates: 38°56′27″N 95°37′54″W
- Country: United States
- State: Kansas
- County: Shawnee
- Township: Monmouth
- Elevation: 997 ft (304 m)
- Time zone: UTC-6 (CST)
  - Summer (DST): UTC-5 (CDT)
- ZIP Code: 66409
- Area code: 785
- FIPS code: 20-06300
- GNIS ID: 479067

Berryton is an unincorporated community in Shawnee County, Kansas, United States. It is located east of the Topeka Regional Airport.

== History ==
Berryton was laid out in 1888 and named for its two founders, George Washington Berry and his son George Webster Berry. The first post office in Berryton was established in May 1888. In 1912 the town was described as, "a little village of Shawnee county, is a station on the Missouri Pacific R. R., 9 miles southeast of the city of Topeka. It has a money order postoffice with one rural delivery route, and is a trading center for the neighborhood in which it is located. The population in 1910 was 75."

It currently has a post office, an elementary school, an event center, and two churches.

== Demographics ==
Berryton is part of the Topeka, Kansas Metropolitan Statistical Area.

== Education ==
The community is served by Shawnee Heights USD 450 public school district. The Shawnee Heights High School mascot is Thunderbirds.

Berryton High School was closed through school unification. The Berryton Buffaloes won the Kansas State High School class B baseball championship in 1951.
