= Truckhenge =

Grassroots art exhibit in Kansas

Coordinates: 39°4′36″N 95°36′5″W

Truckhenge is a grassroots art exhibit, part of Lessman's Farm & Catfish Pond, located between Tecumseh and Topeka, Kansas. Truckhenge and Beer Bottle City are also part of the Kaw Region Art Park, as designated by the Association of Shawnee County Recycling And Preservation.

Truckhenge during the May 2007 floods.

Ron Lessman began creating Truckhenge in May 2000, using antique trucks and a bus he collected over the years. After a legal battle with Shawnee County, Kansas over the trucks, a judge ordered Lessman to "pick up the trucks". So, he picked them up. Each truck is anchored into the ground with 23 tons of concrete, and each truck contains several quotes by Ron Lessman. Along with the trucks, there are several beer-bottle sculptures and structures integrated into the park as "Beer-Bottle City".

On July 5, 2006, Truckhenge was officially dedicated as part of the Kaw Region Art Park after the Shawnee County Recycling and Preservation Association presented Lessman with a plaque in honor of his work.

Truckhenge in February 2006

On July 7, 2006, the Lessman Farm and Catfish Pond hosted a political fundraiser for the Libertarian Party of Kansas (LPKS), after the fundraiser was forcibly blocked from its original location at Lake Edun by Shawnee County officials.

The Lessman Farm & Truckhenge played host to a concert called "The f*** Phelps Phestival" on June 1 to June 3, 2007. The concert was headlined by the band "Bite Boy".

In July 2007, Ron Lessman began adding onto Truckhenge using several small boats.

Truckhenge has been featured in videos from the KDHE (KS Department of Health & Environment), Roadside America, KS Travel, Rare Visions and Roadside Revelations, and the Filip and Frederik Show.
