= Lake Sherwood (Kansas) =

Lake in Kansas, United States of America

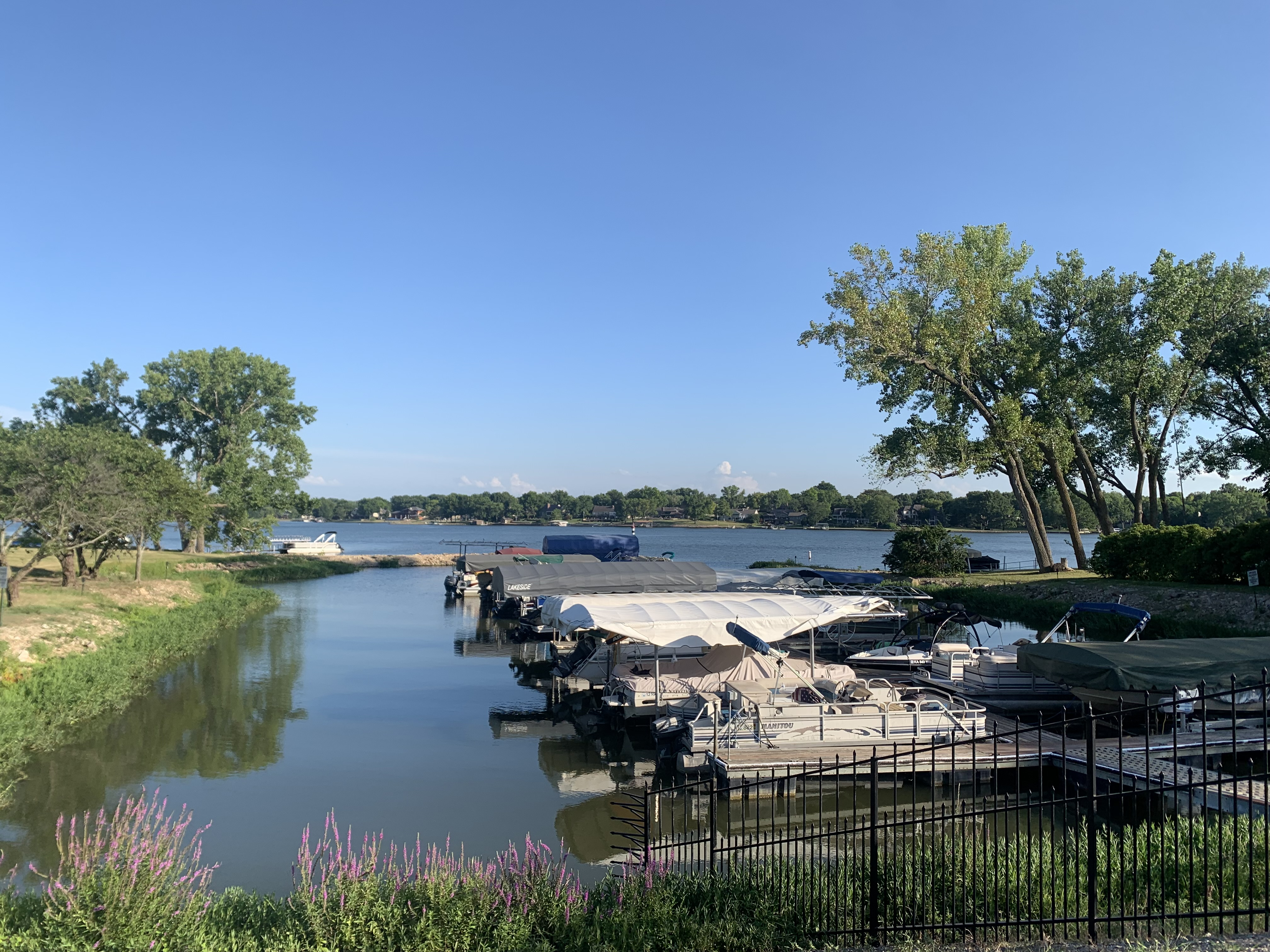
- Sherwood Lake at boat dock in central Mission Township, facing south (2025)

- Location within Kansas Location within the United States
- Location: Shawnee County, near Topeka, Kansas
- Coordinates: 39°00′05″N 95°46′58″W
- Basin countries: United States
- Surface elevation: 1,001 ft (305 m)

Lake Sherwood is a man-made lake located near the city limits, southwest of Topeka, Kansas, United States. The name is also used for the surrounding community.
