= Dana Killinger =

American politician

Member of the Kansas Senate from the 13th district
- In office January 2, 1973 – October 1973
- Preceded by: Tom West
- Succeeded by: Jim Parrish

Personal details
- Born: March 6, 1936 Topeka, Kansas
- Died: October 22, 2001 Topeka, Kansas
- Party: Democratic
- Spouse: Marjorie L. Killinger

Dana W. Killinger (March 6, 1936–October 22, 2001) was a lawyer and pharmacist from Topeka, Kansas who served a brief one year term in the Kansas State Senate, following the resignation of his predecessor Tom West for health reasons. He received his bachelor of science in pharmacy from Kansas University and his law degree from Washburn University.

In 1971, Killinger worked for the Kansas legistlative office. He worked for the State Highway Commission and was also a farm owner.. Before his retirement, he was the attorney for the State Board of Pharmacy for eight years.
