= Shawnee Heights USD 450 =

Public school district in Tecumseh, Kansas

Coordinates: 38°59′14″N 95°33′27″W

Address
- 4401 S.E. Shawnee Heights Rd. Tecumseh, Kansas, 66542; United States

District information
- Type: Public
- Grades: PreK to 12
- Superintendent: Sheila Meggers

Other information
- Website: usd450.net

Shawnee Heights USD 450 is a public unified school district headquartered in Tecumseh, Kansas, United States. The district includes the communities of southeast edge of Topeka, Tecumseh, Berryton, Watson, and nearby rural areas. The Shawnee Heights School District is a 5A school district that includes a total of 4 Elementary Schools, 1 Middle School, and 1 High School. Shawnee Heights School District is a suburban school district located in southeastern Shawnee County. The District has an estimated total of 3,500 Students from Pre-Kindergarten to 12th Grade. Tim Hallacy is the superintendent for the School District.

== Schools ==
The school district operates the following schools:

Shawnee Heights High School

Shawnee Heights High School's mascot is the Thunderbird. It is a North Centrally accredited 9-12 high school. The number of students as of the current school year is about 1,100 Students. Students have a range of activities to compete in, such as Basketball, Soccer, Golf, Tennis, Baseball, Softball, and Track (etc.). Shawnee Heights also offers NJROTC for students that want a military experience before perhaps joining the United States Armed Forces. Exactly 80% of the students that graduate from Shawnee Heights plan to attend a 2 or 4 year college to better their education. Shawnee Heights has also achieved the Standard of Excellence in 11th grade Reading and School-Wide Reading. The School's principal, Ed West, is set to retire and have a new successor in the 2026-2027 school year.

Shawnee Heights Middle School

Shawnee Heights Middle School's mascot is the Thunderbird. The Middle School has around 580 Students. The 7th and 8th Grade Students are split up into Red, White, and Blue Teams. The Teams each have a set of teachers for a better learning experience and less of a confusion for the younger Students. The Middle School provides sport programs for the Students but not to the extent that the High School does. The School has 3 computer rooms and an award-winning media center. The School uses an academic program called S.T.A.T.E. This gives the Students some incentive to get good grades and work hard. Benefits to this program include free entry into home games, free food, free gift cards, and the special dinner at the end of the year known, as "Night of the Stars". This dinner is for students achieving T-Bird P.R.I.D.E. for the entire year. The Principal for the Middle School is Tim Urich. The Assistant Principal is Bradley Mickens.

Shawnee Heights Elementary School

Shawnee Heights Elementary School's mascot is a Thunderbolt. S.H.E.S. is the common abbreviation for this building. S.H.E.S. is the biggest elementary school in the District. S.H.E.S. has around 490 Students in its curriculum. S.H.E.S. has and Orchestra Program that begins in the 5th grade that continues to the High School level. S.H.E.S. also has a Band Program that begins in the 5th grade that carries on to the High School too. All grades except preschool attend daily physical education and vocal music education. S.H.E.S. has reached the Standard of Excellence in 3rd Reading and Math, 5th Reading and Math, 6th Reading and Math, School-Wide Reading, and School-Wide Math. The Principal of S.H.E.S. is Shawnie Hays.

Tecumseh North Elementary School

Tecumseh North Elementary School's mascot is the Panther. Tecumseh North is abbreviated; T.N.E.S. T.N.E.S. currently has 400 students in its building. T.N.E.S. has a special education program including gifted education, a math specialist, two reading specialists, a Band Program that begins in 5th grade and an Orchestra Program beginning in 5th grade. All grades except kindergarten and preschool attend daily physical education and vocal music education. T.N.E.S. has achieved the state's Standard of Excellence in 3rd Grade Reading and 5th Grade Math. The Principal of T.N.E.S. is Chris Korb.

Tecumseh South Elementary School

Tecumseh South Elementary School's mascot is the Mustang. Tecumseh South is abbreviated; T.S.E.S. T.S.E.S. has 440 students currently enrolled in the school. T.S.E.S. has a special education program including gifted education, a reading specialist with literacy tutors, a Band Program that begins in 5th grade and an Orchestra Program beginning in 5th grade. All grades except kindergarten and preschool attend daily physical education and vocal music education. TSES has a gorgeous library, an enormous computer lab, and two mobile labs that include more than 50 laptops. T.S.E.S performed well on the state assessments, and made the Standard of Excellence in 9 categories. Those categories are 3rd Grade Reading, 4th Grade Reading, 5th Grade Reading, 6th Grade Reading, School-Wide Reading, 5th Grade Math, 6th Grade Math, School-Wide Math, and 4th Grade Science. T.S.E.S. had the most awards out of all of the elementary schools in the District. The Principal of T.S.E.S. is Scott Dial.

Berryton Elementary School

Berryton Elementary School's mascot is the buffalo. B.E.S is the abbreviation for Berryton. B.E.S. is the smallest elementary school in the District. B.E.S. has 380 students enrolled in Berryton. B.E.S. has a special education program including gifted education, a reading specialist, a Band Program that begins in 5th grade and an Orchestra Program beginning in 5th grade. B.E.S. has a spacious library and a modern computer lab. Intramural programs are provided for students in the mornings before class. Bus transportation services are provided for all students that are within the district. Berryton is a wonderful school and does well on state and national tests. B.E.S. scored well on 7 categories, those are as follows; 3rd Grade Reading, 3rd Grade Math, 4th Grade Reading, 4th Grade Math, 5th Grade Math, School-Wide Reading, and School-Wide Math. The Principal of B.E.S. is Kyrstin Bervert.

== County Information ==
Shawnee Heights Unified School District 450 Shawnee Heights serves Douglas County, Osage County, and Shawnee County, serving communities such as Topeka, Tecumseh, Big Springs, Berryton, and rural areas within the three counties.

== See also ==
- Kansas State Department of Education
- Kansas State High School Activities Association
- List of high schools in Kansas
- List of unified school districts in Kansas

Topeka is served by four public school districts, including:

- Seaman USD 345 (serving North Topeka)
- Auburn–Washburn USD 437 (serving west and southwest Topeka)
- Shawnee Heights USD 450 (serving extreme east and southeast Topeka)
- Topeka USD 501 (serving inner-city Topeka)
