= Nancy Parrish =

American politician and judge from Kansas (born 1948)

Member of the Kansas Senate from the 19th district
- In office January 1980 – January 11, 1993
- Preceded by: Jim Parrish
- Succeeded by: Anthony Hensley

Personal details
- Born: November 9, 1948 (age 77) Cedar Vale, Kansas
- Party: Democratic
- Spouse: Jim Parrish
- Children: 4
- Education: Kansas State University (B.A.; University of Kansas (M.A.); Washburn University (J.D.)

Nancy Elaine Buchele Parrish (born November 9, 1948) is an American former politician and judge from Kansas. A member of the Democratic party, she has served in the Kansas State Senate, in the cabinet of Governor Joan Finney, and as a district judge in Shawnee County, Kansas.

Parrish grew up in Cedar Vale, Kansas and attended Kansas State University as an undergraduate. She received a master's degree in special education from the University of Kansas, and a Juris Doctor degree from Washburn University School of Law. She worked as a public school teacher and married Jim Parrish, a state legislator.

In January 1980, Jim Parrish resigned his seat in the Kansas State Senate; in an interview, Nancy Parrish stated that the resignation was for business reasons. When a Senator resigns, their replacement for the rest of the term is chosen by local party officials. Nancy Parrish actively campaigned for her seat and won amongst the precinct committee members; she was then re-elected in her own right in 1982, 1986 and 1990.

Parrish resigned the seat herself in January 1993, when she was appointed Secretary of Revenue by newly elected governor Joan Finney. During her tenure at the Revenue Department, she worked with State Senator Gus Bogina to modernize the computing system of the department. In 1994, Finney named her a judge in the Third Judicial District, covering Shawnee County.

Parrish served for 27 years as a judge, including as chief judge of her district from 2005 to 2013. She presided over more than 100 jury trials, retiring on June 24, 2022.
