= Wakarusa, Kansas =

Unincorporated community in Shawnee County, Kansas

- CDP
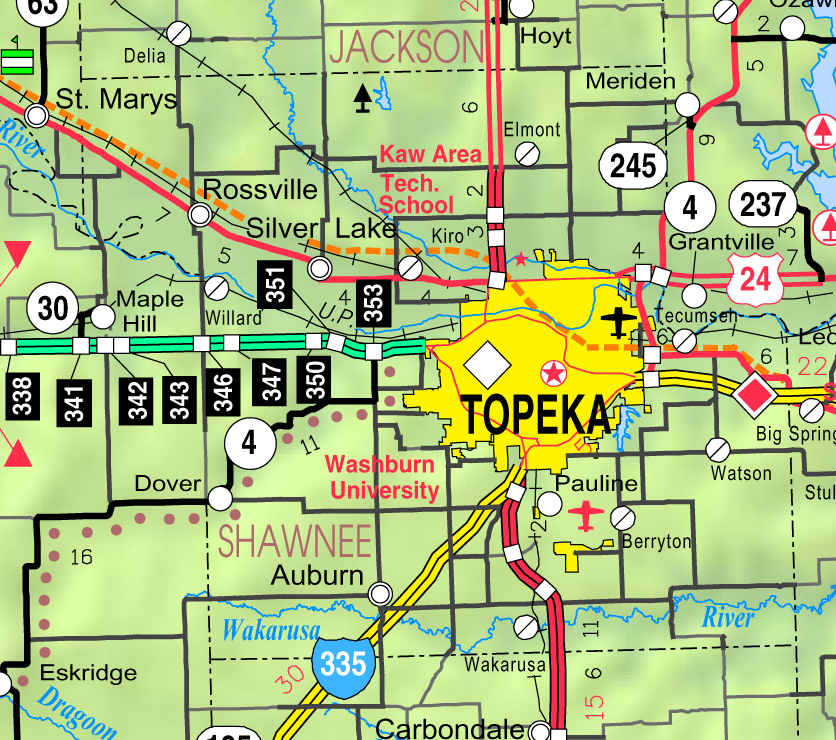
- KDOT map of Shawnee County (legend)

- Location within Kansas Location within the United States
- Coordinates: 38°53′09″N 95°41′45″W
- Country: United States
- State: Kansas
- County: Shawnee

Area
  - Total: 4.999 sq mi (12.95 km^{2})
  - Land: 4.965 sq mi (12.86 km^{2})
  - Water: 0.034 sq mi (0.088 km^{2})
- Elevation: 951 ft (290 m)

Population (2020)
  - Total: 242
  - Density: 48.7/sq mi (18.8/km^{2})
- Time zone: UTC-6 (CST)
  - Summer (DST): UTC-5 (CDT)
- ZIP Code: 66546
- Area code: 785
- FIPS code: 20-74425
- GNIS ID: 2629183

Wakarusa is a census-designated place (CDP) in Shawnee County, Kansas, United States. As of the 2020 census, the population was 242. It is located 11 miles (18 km) south of downtown Topeka.

== History ==
Wakarusa was founded in 1858.

Wakarusa has a post office with ZIP Code 66546.

== Demographics ==
Historical population
Census	Pop.	Note	%±
2010	260		—
2020	242		−6.9%
U.S. Decennial Census

For statistical purposes, the United States Census Bureau has defined Wakarusa as a census-designated place (CDP).

== Education ==
The community is served by Auburn–Washburn USD 437 public school district.
