= Auburn, Kansas =

City in Shawnee County, Kansas

- City
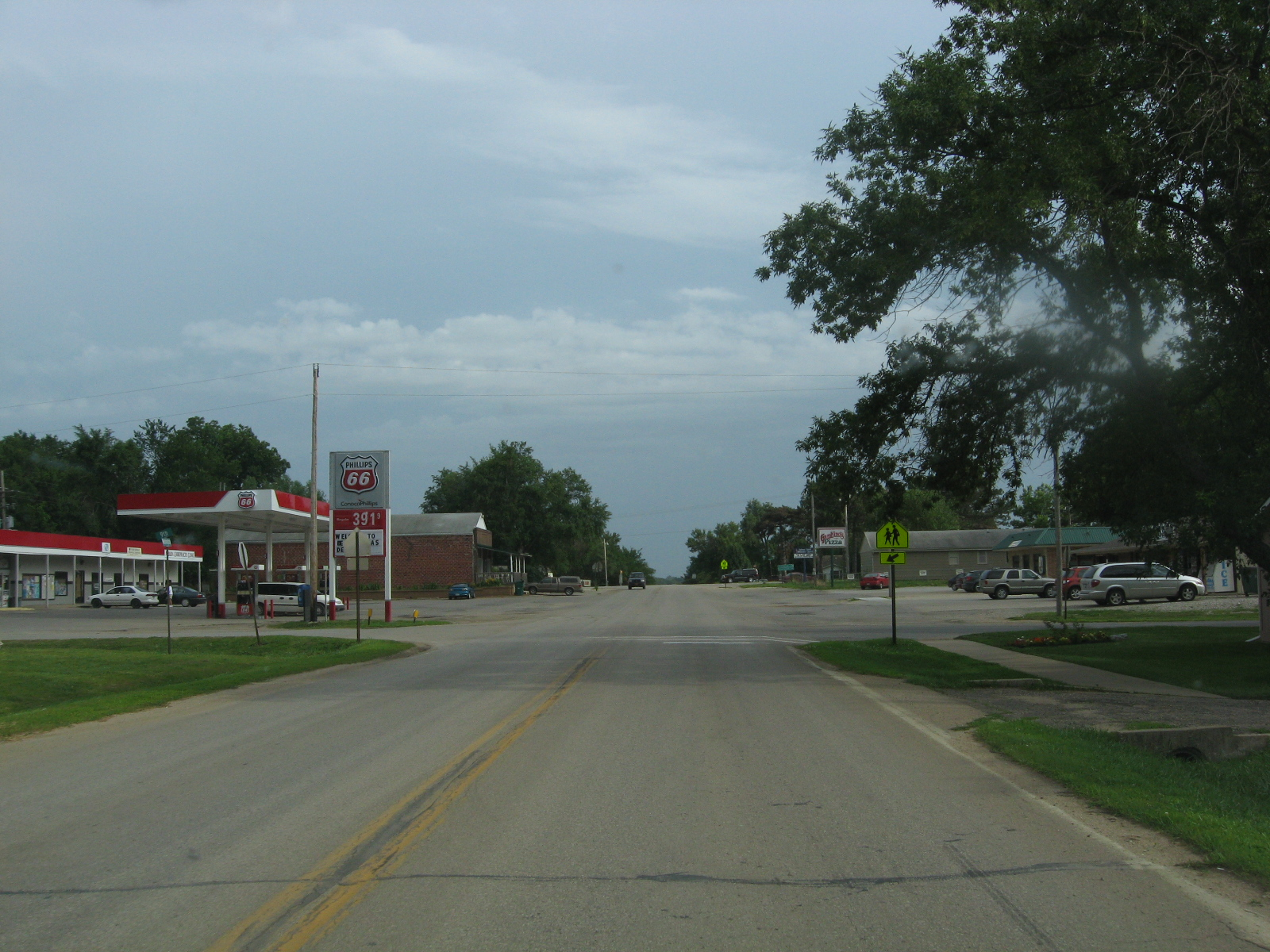
- Downtown Auburn (2008)

- Location within Shawnee County and Kansas

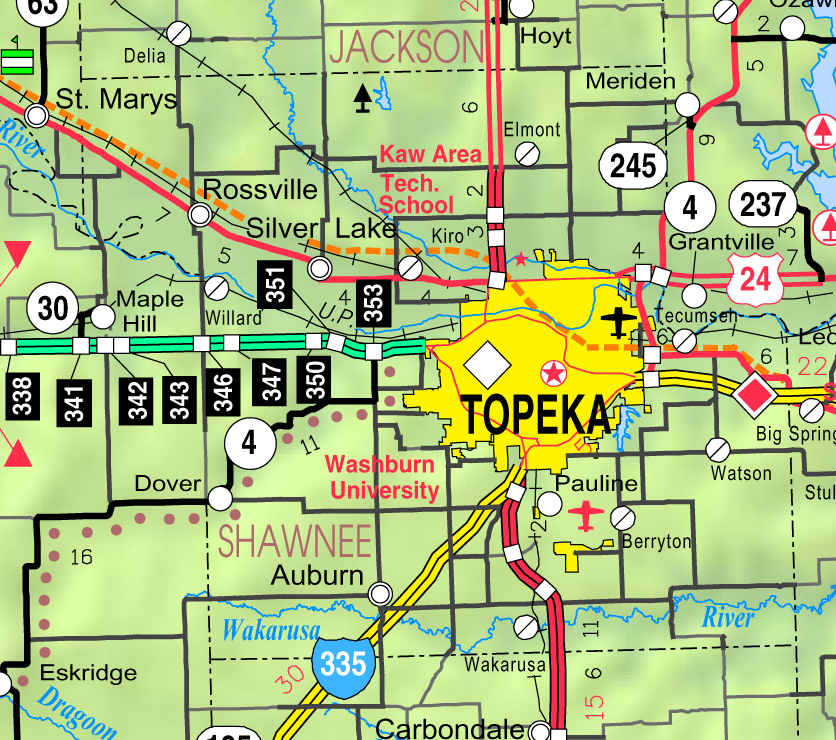
- KDOT map of Shawnee County (legend)
- Coordinates: 38°54′28″N 95°48′57″W
- Country: United States
- State: Kansas
- County: Shawnee
- Founded: 1856
- Incorporated: 1963

Area
  - Total: 0.70 sq mi (1.81 km^{2})
  - Land: 0.69 sq mi (1.80 km^{2})
  - Water: 0.0039 sq mi (0.01 km^{2})
- Elevation: 1,079 ft (329 m)

Population (2020)
  - Total: 1,273
  - Density: 1,830/sq mi (707/km^{2})
- Time zone: UTC-6 (CST)
  - Summer (DST): UTC-5 (CDT)
- ZIP Code: 66402
- Area code: 785
- FIPS code: 20-03250
- GNIS ID: 2394025
- Website: auburnks.com

Auburn is a city in Shawnee County, Kansas, United States. As of the 2020 census, the population of the city was 1,273.

== History ==
=== 19th century ===
In July 1854, John W. Brown came to this area and found it highly suitable for a homestead. He acquired 800 acres (3.2 km^{2}) through bartering with local Indians and later returned home to Missouri to tell his family and friends about the area, some of whom returned with him. In 1856, Mr. Brown, along with M. C. Dickey, Loring Farnsworth and Henry Fox pre-empted 320 acres (1.3 km^{2}) for the purpose of a town. They christened it Brownville, although it was changed in 1857 to its present name of "Auburn" due to the fact there was another settlement with the same name. This was before the introduction of postal codes. It was located on the California Road and work began at once on the many buildings needed in a town of Brownville's size. Two daily stage lines brought mail and people to the town and business was very good.

Robert Simmerwell was a missionary to the Indians in Auburn. He originally served as a missionary among the Pottawatomie Indians in Michigan Territory, while he apprenticed to a blacksmith and attended school at night. He later came to the Baptist Shawnee Mission on Pottawatomie Creek in eastern Kansas. In 1848, the government set up a new mission a few miles west of Topeka. In a three-story stone building with twelve rooms, boys and girls were given instruction in the manual arts, as well as in reading, writing, arithmetic, and religious subjects. In the fall of 1854, Simmerwell and his wife had retired from active work in the Pottawatomie Mission, to homestead on 160 acres (0.6 km^{2}) southwest of the town.

In the 1850s, the city grew rapidly and was often referred to as a "boom town". It was one of the largest in the state, and nearly became the state capital. However, Auburn was cast aside as an option, as the railroad bypassed the city. Topeka was chosen to be the capital because it had the railroad and an important ferry site along the Kansas River. Auburn's population dwindled, but continued to hover around 100 for many decades.

=== 20th century ===
A description of the town from a 1912 volume of Kansas: A Cyclopedia of State History is as follows:

Auburn, a money order post office of Shawnee county, is in the township of the same name, about 15 miles (24 km) southwest of Topeka and 8 miles (13 km) west of Wakarusa, which is the nearest railroad station. It is a trading center for that section of the county, has Baptist, Methodist and Presbyterian churches, telephone connection with Topeka and other adjacent points, and in 1910 reported a population of 72. Two rural free delivery routes start from the Auburn office and supply daily mail to the farmers of the vicinity.

Auburn finally began to grow in population in the 1950s. An important issue at this time was the city's small school system. It consisted of Auburn Grade School (grades K–5) and Auburn High School (grades 6–12). The Highschool was quickly becoming overcrowded. It was eventually decided that the Auburn School district would merge with the Washburn School District to increase efficiency. The last class graduated from Auburn High in 1966. The high school was razed to construct Auburn Middle School, and in 1990 this school closed and was converted to a community center, and the grade school remains open to this day.

In the 1960s and 1970s, the city's population shrank, but was re-vitalized with large housing projects. Between 1975 and 1985, roughly 100 new split-level homes were built.

=== 21st century ===
Most Auburn residents commute to other surrounding cities for work, often Topeka. Currently, there are three churches in Auburn: Presbyterian, Christian, and Methodist. The Auburn Community Center houses a community library.

Auburn has a full-time police department and a fully equipped volunteer fire department (Shawnee County Fire No. 2). There is also a road maintenance and utilities department.

== Geography ==
According to the United States Census Bureau, the city has a total area of 0.64 square miles (1.66 km^{2}), all land.

=== Climate ===
The climate in this area is characterized by hot, humid summers and generally mild to cool winters. According to the Köppen Climate Classification system, Auburn has a humid subtropical climate, abbreviated "Cfa" on climate maps.

== Demographics ==
Historical population
Census	Pop.	Note	%±
1880	100		—
1970	261		—
1980	890		241.0%
1990	908		2.0%
2000	1,121		23.5%
2010	1,227		9.5%
2020	1,273		3.7%
U.S. Decennial Census

Auburn is part of the Topeka, Kansas Metropolitan Statistical Area.

=== 2020 census ===
The 2020 United States census counted 1,273 people, 483 households, and 331 families in Auburn. The population density was 1,829.0 per square mile (706.2/km^{2}). There were 501 housing units at an average density of 719.8 per square mile (277.9/km^{2}). The racial makeup was 89.0% (1,133) white or European American (86.96% non-Hispanic white), 1.49% (19) black or African-American, 0.55% (7) Native American or Alaska Native, 0.31% (4) Asian, 0.0% (0) Pacific Islander or Native Hawaiian, 1.1% (14) from other races, and 7.54% (96) from two or more races. Hispanic or Latino of any race was 4.79% (61) of the population.

Of the 483 households, 39.8% had children under the age of 18; 48.4% were married couples living together; 31.1% had a female householder with no spouse or partner present. 28.0% of households consisted of individuals and 14.1% had someone living alone who was 65 years of age or older. The average household size was 2.4 and the average family size was 3.0. The percent of those with a bachelor's degree or higher was estimated to be 12.7% of the population.

31.3% of the population was under the age of 18, 7.3% from 18 to 24, 27.1% from 25 to 44, 20.7% from 45 to 64, and 13.6% who were 65 years of age or older. The median age was 34.5 years. For every 100 females, there were 111.5 males. For every 100 females ages 18 and older, there were 118.8 males.

The 2016–2020 5-year American Community Survey estimates show that the median household income was $57,639 (with a margin of error of +/- $12,449) and the median family income was $75,469 (+/- $15,717). Males had a median income of $46,481 (+/- $4,101) versus $27,941 (+/- $6,189) for females. The median income for those above 16 years old was $39,286 (+/- $2,527). Approximately, 12.9% of families and 7.3% of the population were below the poverty line, including 1.0% of those under the age of 18 and 9.4% of those ages 65 or over.

=== 2010 census ===
As of the census of 2010, there were 1,227 people, 467 households, and 320 families residing in the city. The population density was 1,917.2 inhabitants per square mile (740.2/km^{2}). There were 492 housing units at an average density of 768.8 per square mile (296.8/km^{2}). The racial makeup of the city was 94.6% White, 0.6% African American, 0.4% Native American, 0.2% Asian, 0.1% Pacific Islander, 0.2% from other races, and 3.8% from two or more races. Hispanic or Latino of any race were 4.1% of the population.

There were 467 households, of which 42.2% had children under the age of 18 living with them, 49.3% were married couples living together, 13.9% had a female householder with no husband present, 5.4% had a male householder with no wife present, and 31.5% were non-families. 28.9% of all households were made up of individuals, and 14.6% had someone living alone who was 65 years of age or older. The average household size was 2.63 and the average family size was 3.28.

The median age in the city was 33 years. 32.4% of residents were under the age of 18; 7% were between the ages of 18 and 24; 26.5% were from 25 to 44; 22.5% were from 45 to 64; and 11.5% were 65 years of age or older. The gender makeup of the city was 47.6% male and 52.4% female.

== Education ==
The community is served by Auburn–Washburn USD 437 public school district.

== Transportation ==
Though Auburn is less than a mile northwest of the Kansas Turnpike, the nearest exit is located northeast in Topeka.

== In popular culture ==
Auburn is the hometown of Cameron Mitchell, a fictional character in the science fiction television series Stargate SG-1.

== Notable person ==
- Nina E. Allender, artist and women's suffrage activist
