= Elmont, Kansas =

Unincorporated community in Shawnee County, Kansas

Coordinates: 39°09′55″N 95°42′11″W

Elmont is an unincorporated community in northern Shawnee County, Kansas, United States.

== History ==
Elmont was incorporated in 1886. It was a shipping point on the Chicago, Rock Island and Pacific Railroad. A post office was opened in Elmont in 1887, and remained in operation until it was discontinued in 1955.

== Education ==
Elmont currently has an Elementary School operated by USD 345 Seaman school district.
