= Montara, Kansas =

Unincorporated community in Shawnee County, Kansas

- Unincorporated community
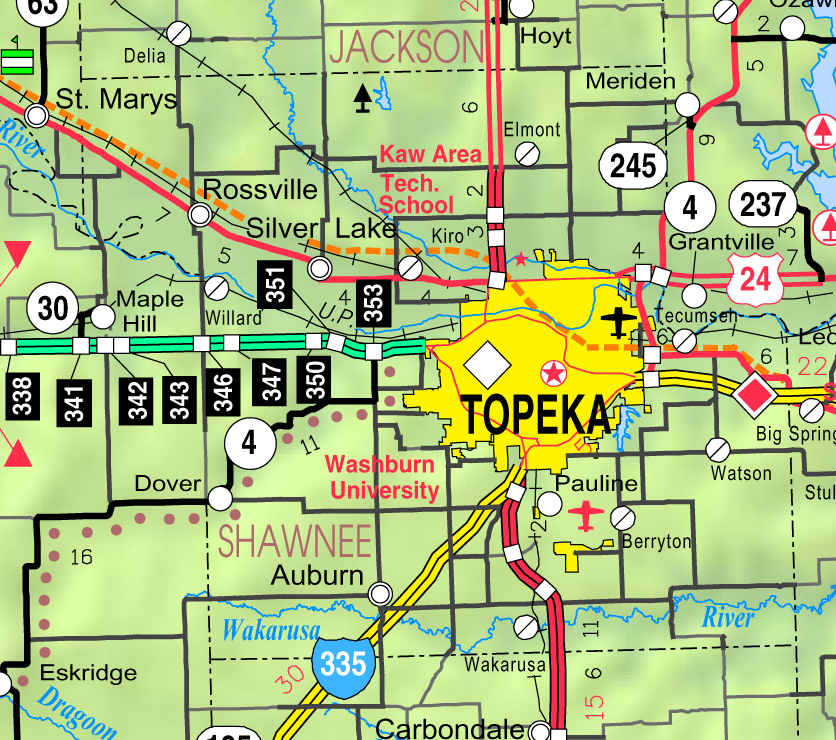
- KDOT map of Shawnee County (legend)

- Location within Kansas Location within the United States
- Coordinates: 38°56′33″N 95°42′12″W
- Country: United States
- State: Kansas
- County: Shawnee
- Elevation: 1,063 ft (324 m)
- Time zone: UTC-6 (CST)
  - Summer (DST): UTC-5 (CDT)
- Area code: 785
- FIPS code: 20-16650
- GNIS ID: 479070

Montara is an unincorporated community in Shawnee County, Kansas, United States. It is located south of Topeka.

== History ==
Montara was largely developed in the 1960s as military housing for the nearby Forbes Air Force Base, and was known as Cullen Village. The base closed in 1973. In 1979, Lario Enterprises bought the community from the city of Topeka, and began refurbishing the approximately 1,050 units for resale. After about 500 units were sold by 1989, the developer turned to renting out units, leaving an owner/renter split in the community (40/60 in 2003).

While a large portion of the homes are owned and rented out by Montara Leasing, over time in recent years a large number of homes have been bought and are now owner-occupied.

In 2014, several properties were damaged in arson fires.

Montara is a quiet community about 3 miles south of Topeka and near the community of Pauline and Topeka Regional Airport. There are three parks, one on the north end, and two on the south end. There are also three baseball diamonds and a soccer field located to the east and behind the Paris Community Center. It also consist of Forbes Golf course and a quarter midget track. There is also a community center (Shawnee County South Community Center) nearby.

== Economy ==
In March 2013, Mars Chocolate North America opened a $250 million plant south of Topeka near the Montara neighborhood. The large industrial complex brought concerns about increased property values.

Topeka Regional Airport is located near Montara.

== Education ==
The community is served by Auburn–Washburn USD 437 public school district. Pauline Central Primary & Pauline South Intermediate schools are located in Montara.
