= Willard, Kansas =

City in Shawnee and Wabaunsee counties in Kansas, United States

- City
- Location within Shawnee County and Kansas

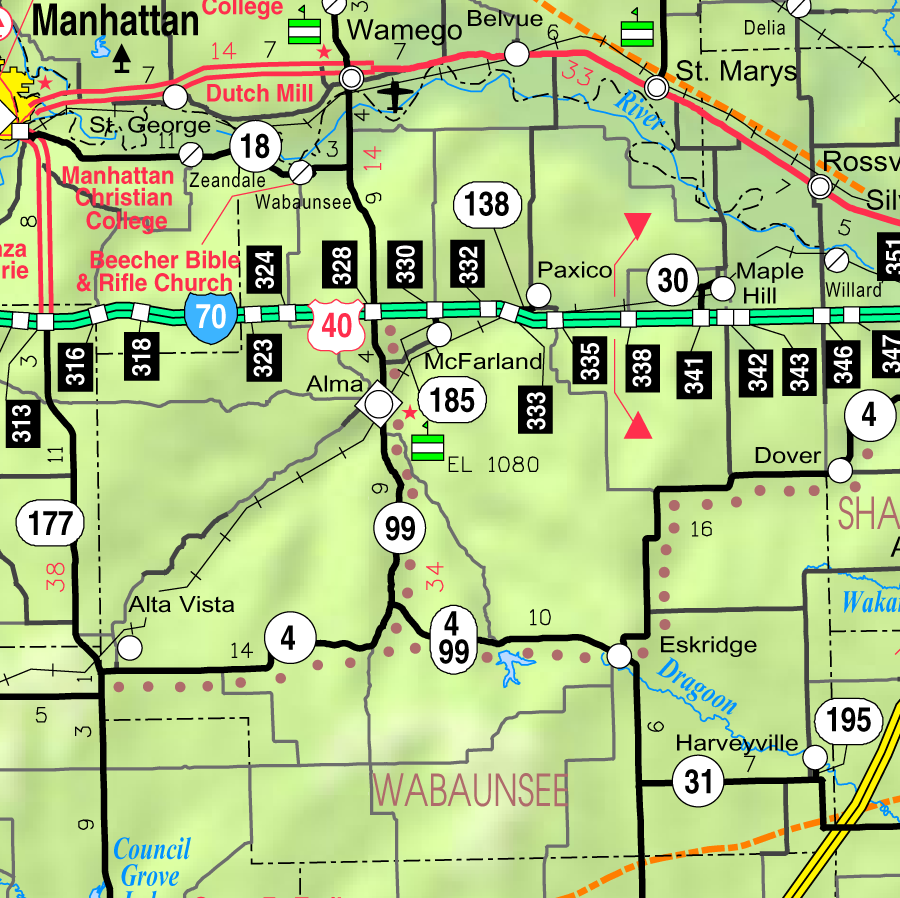
- KDOT map of Wabaunsee County (legend)
- Coordinates: 39°05′39″N 95°56′35″W
- Country: United States
- State: Kansas
- Counties: Shawnee, Wabaunsee
- Founded: 1880s
- Incorporated: 1912

Government
  - Type: Mayor–Council

Area
  - Total: 0.11 sq mi (0.28 km^{2})
  - Land: 0.11 sq mi (0.28 km^{2})
  - Water: 0 sq mi (0.00 km^{2})
- Elevation: 915 ft (279 m)

Population (2020)
  - Total: 74
  - Density: 680/sq mi (260/km^{2})
- Time zone: UTC-6 (CST)
  - Summer (DST): UTC-5 (CDT)
- Area code: 785
- FIPS code: 20-79250
- GNIS ID: 2397313

Willard is a city in Shawnee and Wabaunsee counties in the State of Kansas, United States. As of the 2020 census, the population of the city was 74.

== History ==
Before 1883, Willard was a tiny community but when the Rock Island Railroad laid tracks through it, Willard became a typical railroad town.

In 1887, the Chicago, Kansas and Nebraska Railway built a main line from Topeka through Willard to Herington. The Chicago, Kansas and Nebraska Railway was foreclosed in 1891 and taken over by Chicago, Rock Island and Pacific Railway, which shut down in 1980 and reorganized as Oklahoma, Kansas and Texas Railroad, merged in 1988 with Missouri Pacific Railroad, merged in 1997 with Union Pacific Railroad. Most locals still refer to this railroad as the "Rock Island".

In the early 1920s, Willard boasted a population of over 300 and was a major cattle shipping point for this region. During the Great Depression of the 1930s, many businesses closed and the railroad declined in importance. The Great Flood of 1951 destroyed much of the community and caused the roadway bridge over the Kansas River to collapse, isolating it from Rossville until a new roadway bridge was built in 1955.

== Geography ==
According to the United States Census Bureau, the city has a total area of 0.11 square miles (0.28 km^{2}), all land.

=== Climate ===
The climate in this area is characterized by hot, humid summers and generally mild to cool winters. According to the Köppen Climate Classification system, Willard has a humid subtropical climate, abbreviated "Cfa" on climate maps.

== Demographics ==
Historical population
Census	Pop.	Note	%±
1920	134		—
1930	142		6.0%
1940	106		−25.4%
1950	95		−10.4%
1960	94		−1.1%
1970	124		31.9%
1980	128		3.2%
1990	110		−14.1%
2000	86		−21.8%
2010	92		7.0%
2020	74		−19.6%
U.S. Decennial Census

Willard is part of the Topeka, Kansas Metropolitan Statistical Area.

=== 2010 census ===
As of the census of 2010, there were 92 people, 34 households, and 26 families living in the city. The population density was 836.4 inhabitants per square mile (322.9/km^{2}). There were 50 housing units at an average density of 454.5 per square mile (175.5/km^{2}). The racial makeup of the city was 92.4% White, 2.2% Native American, and 5.4% from two or more races. Hispanic or Latino of any race were 6.5% of the population.

There were 34 households, of which 32.4% had children under the age of 18 living with them, 58.8% were married couples living together, 8.8% had a female householder with no husband present, 8.8% had a male householder with no wife present, and 23.5% were non-families. 17.6% of all households were made up of individuals, and 2.9% had someone living alone who was 65 years of age or older. The average household size was 2.71 and the average family size was 3.04.

The median age in the city was 35 years. 28.3% of residents were under the age of 18; 8.6% were between the ages of 18 and 24; 26% were from 25 to 44; 26% were from 45 to 64; and 10.9% were 65 years of age or older. The gender makeup of the city was 46.7% male and 53.3% female.

=== 2000 census ===
As of the census of 2000, there were 86 people, 38 households, and 22 families living in the city. The population density was 806.5 inhabitants per square mile (311.4/km^{2}). There were 50 housing units at an average density of 468.9 per square mile (181.0/km^{2}). The racial makeup of the city was 97.67% White, 1.16% Native American, 1.16% from other races. Hispanic or Latino of any race were 8.14% of the population.

There were 38 households, out of which 28.9% had children under the age of 18 living with them, 50.0% were married couples living together, 7.9% had a female householder with no husband present, and 42.1% were non-families. 36.8% of all households were made up of individuals, and 10.5% had someone living alone who was 65 years of age or older. The average household size was 2.26 and the average family size was 3.09.

In the city, the population was spread out, with 27.9% under the age of 18, 2.3% from 18 to 24, 30.2% from 25 to 44, 24.4% from 45 to 64, and 15.1% who were 65 years of age or older. The median age was 44 years. For every 100 females, there were 100.0 males. For every 100 females age 18 and over, there were 87.9 males.

The median income for a household in the city was $24,500, and the median income for a family was $35,000. Males had a median income of $22,813 versus $19,375 for females. The per capita income for the city was $16,513. There were no families and 5.7% of the population living below the poverty line, including no under eighteens and 9.1% of those over 64.

== Education ==
The community is served by Kaw Valley USD 321 public school district.
