= Tecumseh, Kansas =

Unincorporated community in Shawnee County, Kansas

- CDP
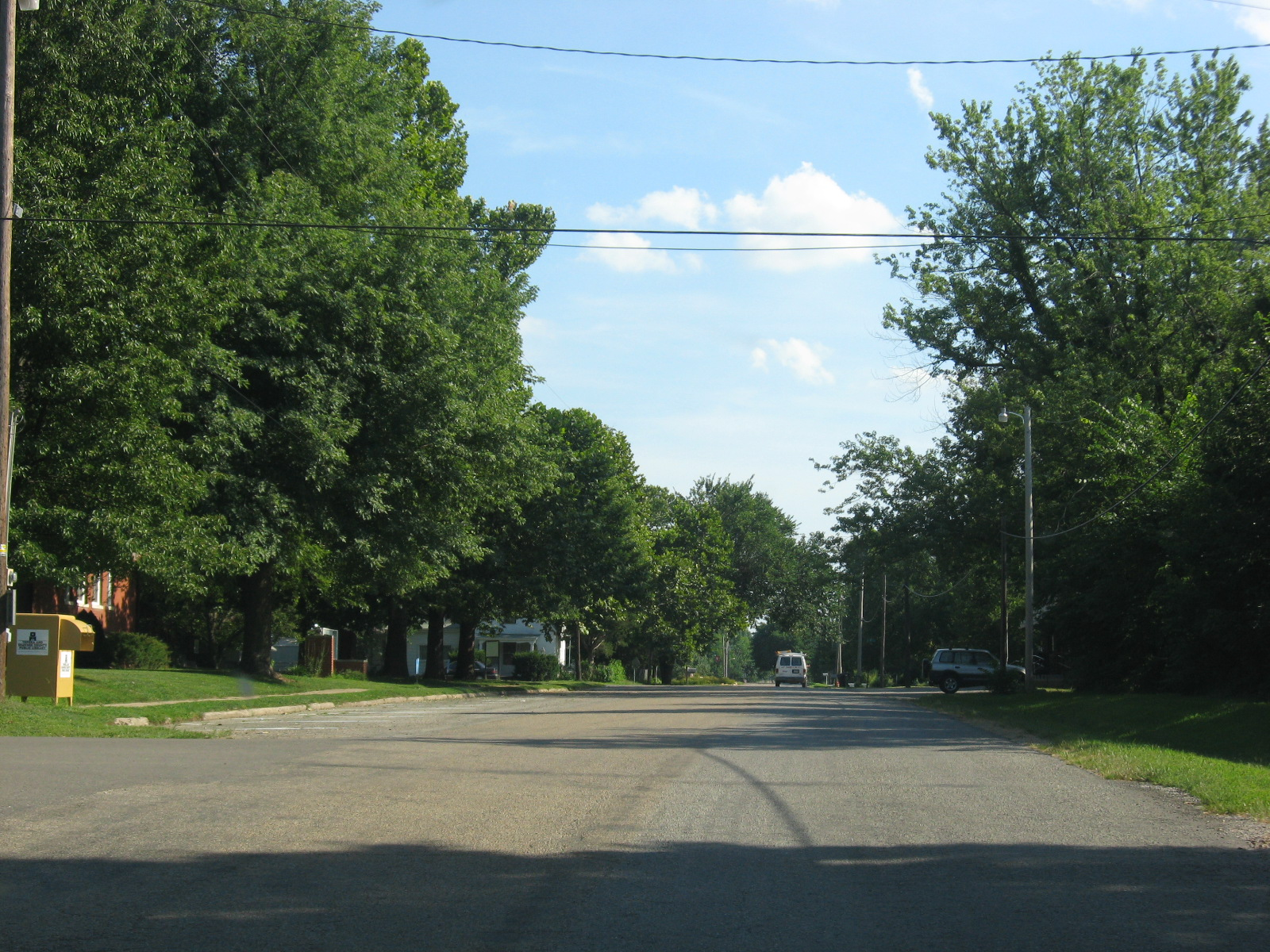
- Central Tecumseh

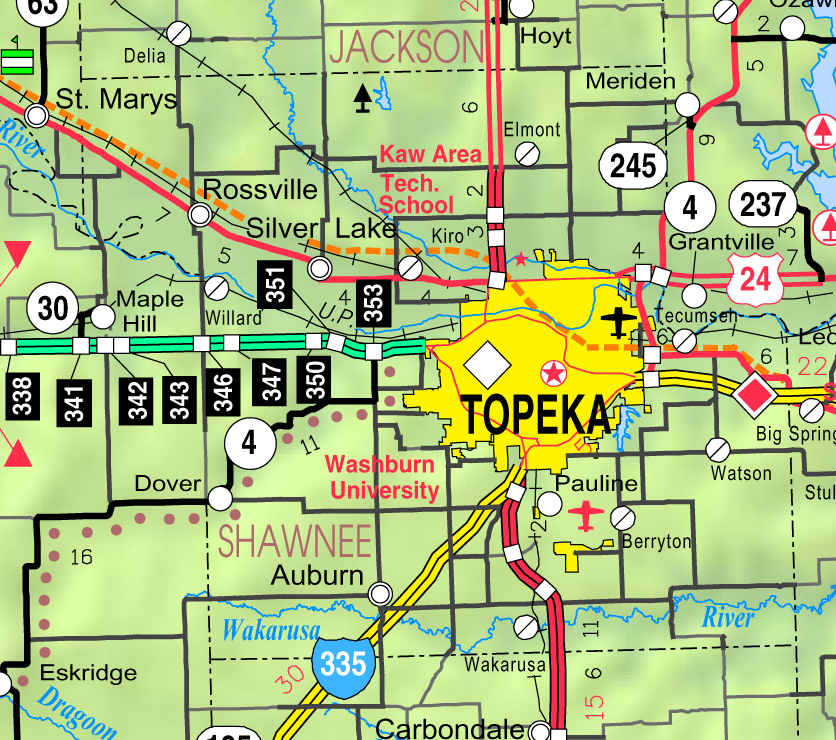
- KDOT map of Shawnee County (legend)

- Location within Kansas Location within the United States
- Coordinates: 39°2′53″N 95°34′45″W
- Country: United States
- State: Kansas
- County: Shawnee
- Elevation: 912 ft (278 m)

Population (2020)
  - Total: 696
- Time zone: UTC-6 (CST)
  - Summer (DST): UTC-5 (CDT)
- ZIP Code: 66542
- Area code: 785
- FIPS code: 20-70075
- GNIS ID: 2804537

Tecumseh is a census-designated place (CDP) in Shawnee County, Kansas, United States, and situated along the Kansas River. As of the 2020 census, the population was 696. The community and township are both named for the Shawnee chief.

== History ==
By September 1, 1854, Thomas Stinson platted the townsite of Tecumseh, having settled in the area within the Kansas Territory. It was settled by pro-slavery partisans in the turbulent days of Bleeding Kansas. It temporarily served as the pro-southern capital of the territory and prospered, even having a newspaper. The town's post office opened in March 1855. In 1886, the brick courthouse was sold for US$500 (equivalent to $17,900 in 2025) and removed. After the Civil War, the town rapidly declined and remained so for the next ninety years.

Construction of the Kansas Power & Light Co. power plant took place in 1924 and 1925. In 1958, DuPont established a cellophane plant east of town, which created a minor boom. As Topeka grew in the 1950s, Tecumseh again started to grow, this time as a suburb of Topeka, with numerous suburban housing subdivisions. In 2018, the Tecumseh Energy Center owned by Westar (later Evergy) closed the plant and the facility was demolished.

== Geography ==
Tecumseh is located in Section 36, Township 11 south, Range 16 east. It is situated south of the Kansas River between Tecumseh Creek to the east and Stinson Creek to the west. Contained entirely within Tecumseh Township, it is approximately two miles east of the Topeka city limits. U.S. Route 40 passes by the south side of Tecumseh. A BNSF rail line—running between Lawrence and Topeka—passes to the north of the town, between the community and the river.

== Demographics ==
Historical population
Census	Pop.	Note	%±
2020	696		—
U.S. Decennial Census

Tecumseh is part of the Topeka, Kansas Metropolitan Statistical Area.

== Economy ==
The community includes a public school (part of USD 450), two churches, a post office, and a cellophane factory.

== Education ==
The community is served by Shawnee Heights USD 450 public school district.
