= Shawnee Heights High School =

Location
- 4201 S.E. Shawnee Heights Road; Tecumseh, Kansas 66542; United States; 38.990087°N 95.562490°W

Information
- School type: Public, High School
- Motto: Small School Feel with Big School Opportunities
- Established: 1962
- School district: Shawnee Heights USD 450
- CEEB code: 172883
- Principal: Sherri Monhollon
- Teaching staff: 70.96 (FTE)
- Grades: 9 to 12
- Gender: coed
- Enrollment: 1,242 (2023-2024)
- Student to teacher ratio: 17.50
- Campus type: Urban
- Colors: Red; White; Turquoise
- Athletics: Class 5A
- Athletics conference: United Kansas Conference
- Mascot: Thunderbird
- Rival: Seaman High School
- Newspaper: The Totem
- Website: School website

Shawnee Heights High School is a fully accredited public high school located in Tecumseh, Kansas, east of Topeka, Kansas, United States. It is operated by Shawnee Heights USD 450 school district. The school colors are red, white and turquoise and the school mascot is the Thunderbird. The average annual enrollment is approximately 1,200 students.

Shawnee Heights is a member of the Kansas State High School Activities Association and offers a variety of sports programs. Athletic teams compete in the 5A division and are known as the "Thunderbirds". Extracurricular activities are also offered in the form of performing arts, school publications, and clubs. The school is a member of the United Kansas Conference.

== History ==
In 1960, when Highland Park High School was annexed into the City of Topeka, the city was in need of a for the Tecumseh students. For two years the students of Tecumseh were transported to Highland Park while a three-member board was formed to investigate the potential of building a High School in that area. In June 1960, the committee outlined the need for the school and recommended that it be a joint venture between Tecumseh (formerly district 10) and Berryton-Richland (formerly District 1). The two communities consolidated, and a decision was made to build the new high school on the 47 acres of purchased land. A principal was hired to help with the planning, and in 1962 Shawnee Heights High School (named as the result of a contest between eighth-grade students of the three attendance centers) was opened. Enrollment in the first year was 260 students in the building constructed to accommodate 400 students.

n 1970 a new junior high school was built for grades 7-9. In 1979 another new building was added. At that time, grades 7-8 were housed in the original high school, grades 9-10 in the 1970 building, and grades 11-12 in the 1979 building. The three buildings created a triangle on the corner of 45th Street and Shawnee Heights Road. In 2004, the 1970 and the 1979 buildings were combined by adding an addition between the two to create one building. Currently, this building houses 9-12 grades.

== Extracurricular activities ==
The Thunderbirds compete in the United Kansas Conference and are classified as a Class 5A school, the second-largest classification in Kansas according to the Kansas State High School Activities Association. Throughout its history, Shawnee Heights has won numerous state championships. Many graduates have gone on to participate in collegiate athletics.

=== Athletics ===
==== Baseball ====
Shawnee Heights has experienced a large amount of success throughout its history. The program has made numerous trips to the Kansas State Baseball Tournament, winning the state championship four times, occurring in 1994, 1999, 2001, 2011. In the 2010–2011 season they managed to go 25–0, in large part because of their 11 seniors.

==== Basketball ====
The Shawnee Heights boys' basketball program was one of the top programs in the state in the 1980s, 1990s, and early 2000s. During that span, the team won four state championships, occurring in 1988, 1989, 2000, and 2002, adding an additional championship in 2017. The Thunderbirds also won several Centennial League titles. The girls' programs has also won state championships in 1977 and 1986.

==== Softball ====
Shawnee Heights is known for softball excellence. This was never more evident than in the 2017 season, in which the Lady T-Birds were undefeated in the regular season and postseason. They capped off a perfect 24–0 season by capturing the 5A State Championship. Shawnee Heights turned in one of the most dominating performances ever seen in the state softball tournament, as they outscored their opponents by a total of 30–2 over the 3 games.

==== Track & Field ====
Shawnee Heights perennially has one of the strongest track and field programs in the state for both boys and girls. The boys' program has won state championships in 1989, 2007, and 2015. The 1989 team was led by future All-American Marcel Carter. Carter became the first male athlete in Kansas history to win four consecutive state championships in the 200m dash, winning from 1986 to 1989. The girls' program won state championships in 1974, 1993, and 2009. The most notable female track and field athlete is Trisa Nickoley who attended the school from 2000 to 2004. In track, she won the state championship in three individual events all four years – 400m (56.10), 800m (2:06.67) and 1600m (5:04.71). She was also state champion in the 4 × 400 m relay. She earned Track & Field News All-American recognition during her final two years and was named the Gatorade Track & Field Athlete of the Year three times.

=== State championships ===
State Championships
Season	Sport	Number of Championships	Year
Fall	Volleyball	3	1999, 2000, 2016
Fall	Cheerleading	3	2017, 2018, 2019
Winter	Basketball, Boys	5	1988, 1989, 2000, 2002, 2017
Winter	Basketball, Girls	2	1977, 1986
Winter	Bowling, Girls	1	2010
Spring	Baseball	4	1994, 1999, 2001, 2011
Spring	Track and Field, Boys	3	1989, 2007, 2015
Spring	Track and Field, Girls	3	1974, 1993, 2009
Spring	Soccer, Girls	1	2004
Spring	Softball	3	2017, 2018, 2019
Total		26	

Shawnee Heights High School offers the following sports:

=== Fall ===
- Football
- Volleyball
- Cross-Country
- Girls' Golf
- Boys' Soccer
- Girls' Tennis
- Cheerleading
- Dance Team (Thunderetts)

=== Winter ===
- Basketball
- Wrestling
- Bowling
- Dance Team
- Winter Cheerleading
- Boys' Swimming/Diving

=== Spring ===
- Baseball
- Boys' Golf
- Boys' Tennis
- Girls' Soccer
- Girls' Swimming/Diving
- Softball
- Track and Field

== Construction project ==
In the summer of 2006 the school received a remodeling and a new construction project after the passage of a bond issue in 2005. This project was completed in the summer of 2007.

This project enclosed the walkway once separating the 9-10 building (now the North Wing) and the 11-12 building (now the South Wing).

== Notable alumni ==
- Corey Ballentine, professional American football cornerback for the Green Bay Packers
- Tom Dinkel, former professional American football linebacker in the National Football League for the Cincinnati Bengals (1978–1985)
- Wyatt Hubert, former football player at Kansas State and now with the Cincinnati Bengals
- Mitch McVicker, Christian musician
- Brad Parscale, campaign manager for Donald Trump's 2020 election campaign and digital media director for Donald Trump's 2016 election campaign
- Troy Wilson, NFL professional football player, member of the 1994 San Francisco 49ers Super Bowl championship team
- Gary Woodland, professional golfer with 4 PGA Tour victories
