= Topeka USD 501 =

Public school district in Topeka, Kansas

Address
- 624 S.W. 24th St. Topeka, Kansas, 66611; United States
- Coordinates: 39°01′36″N 95°41′11″W

District information
- Type: Public
- Grades: Pre-K to 12
- Superintendent: Tiffany Anderson
- Schools: 33
- NCES District ID: 2012260

Students and staff
- Students: 13,430
- Teachers: 1,105

Other information
- Website: topekapublicschools.net

Topeka USD 501, also known as Topeka Public Schools, is a public unified school district headquartered in Topeka, Kansas, United States. It is one of four school districts that serve the city of Topeka. Serving 13,430 students in the 2019-2020 school year, the district comprises 5 high schools, 6 middle schools, 15 elementary schools, and 7 other schools focused on serving other Pre-K-12 students. It has the highest enrollment of all school districts in Shawnee County. Topeka Public Schools is widely known for its role in the landmark Brown v. Board of Education school desegregation case.

== Administration ==
As of June 2016, the school district is under the administration of Superintendent Tiffany Anderson.

== Board of education ==
As of August 2026, the Board of Education is under the leadership of President Lisa Schmitt.

== Current schools ==
The school district operates the following schools:

High Schools

Traditional high schools:

- Highland Park High School
- Topeka High School
- Topeka West High School

Non-traditional high schools:

- Capital City High School
- Hope Street Academy

Middle Schools

- Chase Middle School
- Eisenhower Middle School
- French Middle School
- Jardine Middle School
- Landon Middle School
- Robinson Middle School

Elementary Schools

- Highland Park Central Elementary School
- Jardine Elementary School
- Lowman Hill Elementary School
- McCarter Elementary School
- McClure Elementary School
- McEachron Elementary School
- Meadows Elementary School
- Quincy Elementary School
- Randolph Elementary School
- Ross Elementary School
- Scott Dual Language Magnet School
- State Street Elementary School
- Whitson Elementary School
- Williams Science & Fine Arts Magnet School

Early Childhood Education Programs

- Kansas Preschool Program at Quinton Heights Education Center
- Parents As Teachers at Quinton Heights Education Center
- Pine Ridge Prep - State Pre-K Program
- Sheldon Child Development Center - Head Start
- Shaner Early Learning Academy

Closed Schools

- Avondale East Elementary School - closed after 2011-12 school year
- Avondale West Elementary School - students moved to Jardine Elementary starting 2017-2018 school year
- Bishop Elementary School - students moved to Jardine Elementary starting 2017-2018 school year
- Linn Elementary School - closed due to budget cuts
- Lundgren Elementary School - closed in 2011
- Quinton Heights Elementary School - now Quinton Heights Preschool Program
- Shaner Elementary School - students moved to Jardine Elementary starting 2017-2018 school year
- Stout Elementary School - closed in 2022

Other Facilities

- Adult Education Center at Washburn Tech
- Capital City School
- Sheldon Head Start
- Topeka Center for Advanced Learning and Careers

== Current facilities ==
Several buildings and facilities are operated by Topeka Public Schools in support of learning, including:

- McKinley L. Burnett Administrative Center
- Chandler Field, adjacent to the former school building, used as a practice field.
- Erickson Suite, a suite of 5 buildings on the former Kansas State Hospital grounds, hosting the USD 501 Campus Police, Hummer Sports Park management, and several program offices.
- Hummer Sports Park, a six-sport facility available for outside use as well as by TPS athletic programs.
- TPS Service Center
- Bishop Professional Development Center

== See also ==
- Kansas State Department of Education
- Kansas State High School Activities Association
- List of high schools in Kansas
- List of unified school districts in Kansas

Topeka is served by four public school districts, including:

- Seaman USD 345 (serving North Topeka)
- Auburn–Washburn USD 437 (serving west and southwest Topeka)
- Shawnee Heights USD 450 (serving extreme east and southeast Topeka)
- Topeka USD 501 (serving inner-city Topeka)
