= Jim Parrish =

American politician from Kansas (born 1946)

Member of the Kansas Senate from the 19th district
- In office 1975 – January 1980
- Preceded by: Dana Killinger
- Succeeded by: Nancy Parrish

Member of the Kansas House of Representatives from the 58th district
- In office 1973–1974

Personal details
- Born: August 25, 1946 (age 79) Great Bend, Kansas
- Party: Democratic
- Spouse: Nancy Elaine Buchele
- Children: 4

Jim Parrish (born August 25, 1946) is a businessman and former politician from the U.S. state of Kansas. During the 1970s, he served as a Democrat in both the Kansas House of Representatives and the Kansas State Senate.

Parrish was born in Great Bend, Kansas. He married Nancy Buchele and moved to Topeka to attend law school in 1970. He ran for the Kansas House in the 1972 elections, serving one term, and then ran for the State Senate in 1974. He was re-elected in 1978, but resigned his seat in January 1980 due to business concerns. The seat was filled by his wife.

During the mid-1980s, Jim Parrish was named chair of the Kansas Democratic Party. He also worked as a hotelier and commercial property manager and developer, and in 2010 was inducted into the Topeka Business Hall of Fame.
