= Shawnee County, Kansas =

County in Kansas, United States

- County
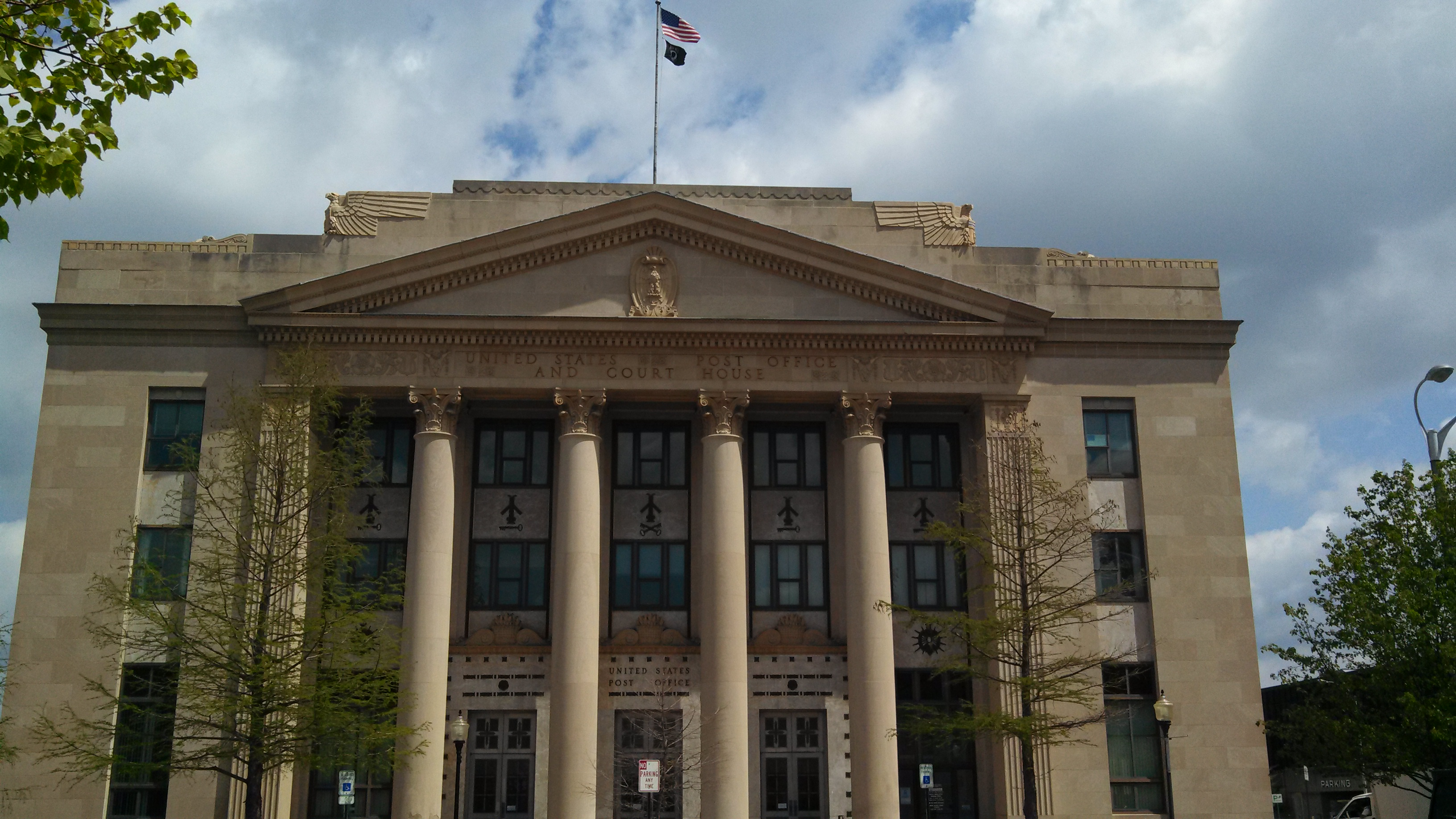
- United States Post Office and Historic Courthouse in Topeka (2013)

- Flag Seal

- Location within the U.S. state of Kansas
- Coordinates: 38°54′12″N 95°49′53″W
- Country: United States
- State: Kansas
- Founded: August 25, 1855
- Named for: Shawnee people
- Seat: Topeka
- Largest city: Topeka

Area
  - Total: 556 sq mi (1,440 km^{2})
  - Land: 544 sq mi (1,410 km^{2})
  - Water: 12 sq mi (31 km^{2}) 2.1%

Population (2020)
  - Total: 178,909
  - Estimate (2025): 178,607 ▼
  - Density: 328.9/sq mi (127.0/km^{2})
- Time zone: UTC−6 (Central)
  - Summer (DST): UTC−5 (CDT)
- Congressional district: 2nd
- Website: snco.gov

Shawnee County is located in northeast Kansas, in the central United States. Its county seat and most populous city is Topeka, the state capital. As of the 2020 census, the population was 178,909, making it the third-most populous county in Kansas. The county was one of the original 33 counties created by the first territorial legislature in 1855, and it was named for the Shawnee tribe.

== History ==
Map of Shawnee County from History of Kansas, 1899

=== Early history ===
For many millennia, the Great Plains of North America was inhabited by nomadic Native Americans. From the 16th century to 18th century, the Kingdom of France claimed ownership of large parts of North America. In 1762, after the French and Indian War, France secretly ceded New France to Spain, per the Treaty of Fontainebleau.

=== 19th century ===
In 1802, Spain returned most of the land to France, but keeping title to about 7,500 square miles. In 1803, most of the land for modern day Kansas was acquired by the United States from France as part of the 828,000 square mile Louisiana Purchase for 2.83 cents per acre.

In 1854, the Kansas Territory was organized, then in 1861 Kansas became the 34th U.S. state. In 1855, Shawnee County was established.

Before the treaty of 1854, the Shawnee, Kansas, and Pottowatomie Indian tribes inhabited the area now known as Shawnee County. Westward expansion brought the country its first white settler in 1830 when Frederick Choteau opened a trading post on American Chief (now Mission) Creek. In 1855, Shawnee became one of the first counties established by the Kansas territorial legislature with a population of 250. General H. J. Strickler, of Tecumseh, a member of the council in 1855, and the joint committee on Counties, claimed Shawnee for the name of his county. At that time, Shawnee County borders were entirely south of the Kansas River and extended south to include Osage City and Carbondale. The legislature later desired to make Topeka the county seat and moved the borders of the county to their present locations to make Topeka centrally located in the county.

1855 also saw the first ever meeting of the Shawnee County Board of Commissioners. Tecumseh was the first county seat, and the first county courthouse was opened there in 1856. The building was 40x50 feet but was never finished. Topeka was made the county seat by popular vote in 1858, and a new courthouse was built at 4th Street and Kansas Avenue in 1867. In 1896, a new larger courthouse was constructed at 5th and Van Buren, with more than 50,000 residents then living in the county. That building remained in use until the current courthouse at 7th and Quincy opened in 1965.

=== Local etymologies ===
Concerning the origin of the names in this county, it is generally understood Shawnee County receives its name from that well known tribe of Indians.

Topeka
A good place to grow potatoes (Prairie potatoes).
Wakarusa
River of big weeds.
Shunganunga
The race course.
Menoken
A fine growth.
Half-Day Creek
Named after a Pottawatomie chief.
Mission Creek
Named after an old Kaw mission on its banks.
Blacksmith Creek
Named after a Kaw blacksmith shop.
Soldier Creek
Its banks were a favorite camping ground for soldiers passing from Fort Leavenworth to Fort Riley.

== Geography ==
Shawnee County is in the northeastern part of Kansas, in the third tier of counties west of the Missouri River and about fifty-four miles south of Nebraska. According to the United States Census Bureau, the county has an area of 556 square miles (1,440 km^{2}), of which 544 square miles (1,410 km^{2}) is land and 12 square miles (31 km^{2}) (2.1%) is water. It is bordered by Jackson County on the north, Jefferson County on the north and east, Douglas County on the east, Osage County on the south, Wabaunsee County on the west, and Pottawatomie County on the west. Its extent in either direction is not more than twenty-four miles. The second standard parallel south passes through the county's northern half.

When the county was formed in 1855, it was bounded by the Kansas River on the north, and the southern boundary was nine miles (14 km) further south. On February 23, 1860, the legislature changed the boundaries with the southern portion being granted to Osage County, and the northern boundary was moved a few miles north of the river (to the second standard parallel). The present northern line (six miles north of the second standard parallel) was established in 1868.

The Kansas River runs east across the county, just north of the center, being bordered on its north bank by the townships of Rossville, Silver Lake, Menoken, and Soldier, and on its south bank by the townships of Dover, Mission, and Tecumseh. The city of Topeka primarily lies to the south of the river. There is little or no current major river traffic, but it is used extensively for irrigation in the county. Major creeks emptying into the Kansas River include Cross, Soldier, Mission, Indian, and Shunganunga Creeks. The Wakarusa River, which, flowing east and northeast, empties into the Kansas River in the northeastern part of Douglas County. It has its sources in the township of Auburn, and waters the southern sections of Auburn, Williamsport and Monmouth—the tributary creeks flowing into it on either side forming the drainage and water system of the three townships.

The soil is a rich dark loam, varying from fifteen feet in some parts of the bottoms, to a uniform surface covering the upland prairie from one to three feet. The underlying formation is limestone. Beds of clay, are well distributed. Coal is found in detached and non-continuous beds, and is mined in a small way for local purposes in Topeka, Soldier and Menoken.

Along the western border the landscape is hilly with the Flint Hills a few miles further west in Wabaunsee County. Burnett's Mound is in the southwest part of Topeka. The highest point in Shawnee county is in Auburn (38° 53' 5 N, 95° 56' 35 W). Government and county surveys described the land as "bottom land, 31%; upland, 69%; forest 8%; prairie, 92%." Wooded areas are mainly found along rivers and creeks with no true forests. The growth consists of elm, cottonwood, black walnut, oak, sycamore, box elder, hickory and ash.

=== Adjacent counties ===
- Jackson County - north
- Jefferson County - northeast
- Douglas County - southeast
- Osage County - south
- Wabaunsee County - west
- Pottawatomie County - northwest

=== Township divisions ===
The county consists of twelve townships: Soldier, Menoken, Silver Lake, Grove, and Rossville north of the Kansas River; Tecumseh, Topeka, Mission, and Dover south of the river; and Monmouth, Williamsport, and Auburn in the southernmost tier of townships occupying the Wakarusa River valley. Being a city of the first class, the city of Topeka is independent of any townships and excluded from the census figures for the townships. It occupies over ten percent of the county's land area and ranks fourth in population among all cities in Kansas. Altogether, the county has five incorporated cities with the other four being cities of the third class: Auburn, Rossville, Silver Lake, and Willard.

Tecumseh Township was one of the two original townships formed in 1855, and it originally extended over all the county south of the Kansas River to the Wakarusa River. The other, Yocum Township, named after county commissioner William Yocum, contained the area south of the Wakarusa River. The formation of the townships of Topeka (1857) and Monmouth (1860) reduced Tecumseh Township to its current greatest extent of about seven miles (11 km) from north to south from the Kansas River and less than seven miles (11 km) from east to west from the county's eastern border. Small portions in the western part have been annexed by the city of Topeka, and its present area is 36 square miles (93 km^{2}). It contains the (unincorporated) towns of Tecumseh, Spencer, and Watson. The town and township were named for the famous Shawnee chief.

Topeka Township was carved out of the western portion of Tecumseh Township in 1857. Following the creation of newer townships and annexations by the city of Topeka, the size of the township has been significantly reduced. Today, it occupies 12 square miles (31 km^{2}), and it is in extent about three miles (4.8 km) from north to south and five miles (8.0 km) from east to west. It contains the town of Pauline.

Monmouth Township, in the county's southeastern corner, has an area of 56 square miles (150 km^{2}). In extent it is eight miles (13 km) north to south and seven miles (11 km) east to west. It contains the town of Berryton. Richland, which was in the township's far southeast corner, was purchased by the U.S. Army Corps of Engineers in the late 1960s as a part of the land acquired for Clinton Lake. By 1974, the town was vacated and the remaining buildings were demolished shortly afterward.

Williamsport Township, established in 1860, was named after Williamsport, Pennsylvania. With an area of 41 square miles (110 km^{2}), it is in extent six miles (9.7 km) from north to south to the county's southern border and seven miles (11 km) from east to west between Monmouth and Auburn townships. It contains the towns of Wakarusa and Cullen Village and the greater portion of Forbes Field (airport).

Auburn Township, 56 square miles (150 km^{2}) in area, occupies the county's southwestern corner. In extent it is six miles (9.7 km) from north to south and ten miles (16 km) from east to west, and it contains the city of Auburn.

Dover Township was carved from northern portions of Auburn Township in 1867 and named after Dover, New Hampshire. In extent it is twelve miles (19 km) from north to south from the Kansas River and six miles (9.7 km) from east to west to the county's western border, with an area of 57 square miles (150 km^{2}). It includes the city of Willard and the towns of Dover and Valencia.

Mission Township was formed from parts of Dover and Topeka townships in 1871. The City of Topeka has since annexed northeastern portions of the township. It now occupies 32 square miles (83 km^{2}), and its greatest extent is not more than eight miles (13 km) from north to south and six miles (9.7 km) from east to west. It contains several subdivisions and the Sherwood Lake area.

Soldier Township was organized following the change in the county's borders in 1860, and it contained all of the county north of the Kansas River until the formation of Silver Lake Township in 1868. A southern portion of the township has been annexed by the city of Topeka. With an area of 63 square miles (160 km^{2}), it is in extent less than ten miles (16 km) from north to south from the county's northern border and less than eight miles (13 km) from east to west from the county's eastern border. It contains the town of Elmont.

Silver Lake Township was carved out of the western portion of Soldier Township after the county's northern border was moved in 1868. The formation of the surrounding townships of Rossville (1871) to the west, Menoken (1879) to the east, and Grove (1918) to the north has reduced the size of the township. With an area of 18 square miles (47 km^{2}), its greatest extent is about five miles (8.0 km) from north to south to the Kansas River and five miles (8.0 km) from east to west. It contains the city of Silver Lake, and it is named after a crescent-shaped lake near the city.

Rossville Township, occupying the county's northwestern corner, was carved out of the western part of Silver Lake Township in 1871. It has an area of 52 square miles (130 km^{2}), and its greatest extent is about nine miles (14 km) from north to south to the Kansas River and seven miles (11 km) from east to west. It includes the city of Rossville. The township and city were named for William W. Ross, the brother of Senator Edmund G. Ross.

Menoken Township, 45 square miles (120 km^{2}) in area, was carved out of the eastern portions of Silver Lake Township in 1879. Extending from the county's northern border to the Kansas River, it is not more than eleven miles (18 km) in extent from north to south and less than five miles (8.0 km) from east to west. The township's name is derived from a Native American word meaning "fine growth" or "a place for fine growing".

Grove Township is the youngest of the townships. It was carved out of the northern portion of Silver Lake Township in 1918. Very little remains of its only town, Grove. With an area of 30 square miles (78 km^{2}), the township is six miles (9.7 km) in extent from north to south from the county's northern border and five miles (8.0 km) from east to west between Menoken and Rossville townships.

== Demographics ==
Historical population
Census	Pop.	Note	%±
1860	3,513		—
1870	13,121		273.5%
1880	29,093		121.7%
1890	49,172		69.0%
1900	53,727		9.3%
1910	61,874		15.2%
1920	69,159		11.8%
1930	85,200		23.2%
1940	91,247		7.1%
1950	105,418		15.5%
1960	141,286		34.0%
1970	155,322		9.9%
1980	154,916		−0.3%
1990	160,976		3.9%
2000	169,871		5.5%
2010	177,934		4.7%
2020	178,909		0.5%
2025 (est.)	178,607	▼	−0.2%
U.S. Decennial Census; 1790-1960 1900-1990; 1990-2000 2010-2020

Shawnee County is included in the Topeka Metropolitan Statistical Area, which had an estimated population of 232,670 in 2021.

=== 2020 census ===
Shawnee County, Kansas – Racial and ethnic composition Note: the US Census treats Hispanic/Latino as an ethnic category. This table excludes Latinos from the racial categories and assigns them to a separate category. Hispanics/Latinos may be of any race.
Race / Ethnicity (NH = Non-Hispanic)	Pop 1980	Pop 1990	Pop 2000	Pop 2010	Pop 2020	% 1980	% 1990	% 2000	% 2010	% 2020
White alone (NH)	134,798	137,250	135,752	134,549	125,873	87.01%	85.26%	79.91%	75.62%	70.36%
Black or African American alone (NH)	11,659	13,058	14,917	14,598	13,531	7.53%	8.11%	8.78%	8.20%	7.56%
Native American or Alaska Native alone (NH)	1,410	1,660	1,750	1,747	1,575	0.91%	1.03%	1.03%	0.98%	0.88%
Asian alone (NH)	715	1,103	1,575	2,048	2,480	0.46%	0.69%	0.93%	1.15%	1.39%
Native Hawaiian or Pacific Islander alone (NH)	x	x	53	119	162	x	x	0.03%	0.07%	0.09%
Other race alone (NH)	184	120	175	172	597	0.12%	0.07%	0.10%	0.10%	0.33%
Mixed race or Multiracial (NH)	x	x	3,319	5,398	10,830	x	x	1.95%	3.03%	6.05%
Hispanic or Latino (any race)	6,150	7,785	12,330	19,303	23,861	3.97%	4.84%	7.26%	10.85%	13.34%
Total	154,916	160,976	169,871	177,934	178,909	100.00%	100.00%	100.00%	100.00%	100.00%

=== 2020 census ===
As of the 2020 census, the county had a population of 178,909. The median age was 39.7 years. 23.3% of residents were under the age of 18 and 19.1% of residents were 65 years of age or older. For every 100 females there were 94.0 males, and for every 100 females age 18 and over there were 90.8 males age 18 and over.

The racial makeup of the county was 74.0% White, 7.9% Black or African American, 1.2% American Indian and Alaska Native, 1.4% Asian, 0.1% Native Hawaiian and Pacific Islander, 4.7% from some other race, and 10.6% from two or more races. Hispanic or Latino residents of any race comprised 13.3% of the population.

83.2% of residents lived in urban areas, while 16.8% lived in rural areas.

There were 73,453 households in the county, of which 28.6% had children under the age of 18 living with them and 29.5% had a female householder with no spouse or partner present. About 32.3% of all households were made up of individuals and 13.7% had someone living alone who was 65 years of age or older.

There were 80,512 housing units, of which 8.8% were vacant. Among occupied housing units, 63.2% were owner-occupied and 36.8% were renter-occupied. The homeowner vacancy rate was 1.3% and the rental vacancy rate was 10.1%.

=== 2000 census ===
As of the census of 2000, there were 169,871 people, 68,920 households, and 44,660 families residing in the county. The population density was 309 inhabitants per square mile (119/km^{2}). There were 73,768 housing units at an average density of 134 per square mile (52/km^{2}). The county's racial makeup was 82.89% White, 9.03% Black or African American, 1.17% Native American, 0.95% Asian, 0.04% Pacific Islander, 3.20% from other races, and 2.72% from two or more races. 7.26% of the population were Hispanic or Latino of any race.

There were 68,920 households, of which 30.70% had children under the age of 18 living with them, 49.60% were married couples living together, 11.60% had a female householder with no husband present, and 35.20% were non-families. 29.80% of all households were made up of individuals, and 10.00% had someone living alone who was 65 years of age or older. The average household size was 2.39 and the average family size was 2.98.

25.30% of the county's residents were under the age of 18, 8.80% were from 18 to 24, 28.40% were from 25 to 44, 23.70% were from 45 to 64, and 13.70% were 65 years of age or older. The median age was 37 years. For every 100 females, there were 93.80 males. For every 100 females age 18 and over, there were 90.00 males.

The county's median household income was $40,988, and the median family income was $51,464. Males had a median income of $35,586 versus $26,491 for females. The county's per capita income was $20,904. About 6.30% of families and 9.60% of the population were below the poverty line, including 12.30% of those under age 18 and 7.10% of those age 65 or over.

== Arts and culture ==
=== Points of interest ===
- Kansas State Capitol in downtown Topeka: constructed from 1866 to 1903, this building houses the Kansas Legislature.
- Kansas Children's Discovery Center in Gage Park
- Topeka Zoo in Topeka: located at Gage Park, this zoo is well known for its flock of eagles.
- Truckhenge at the Lessman Farm, 2 miles (3.2 km) east of Topeka's Billard Airport, is part of a grassroots art park.
- Lake Shawnee in southeast Topeka offers playgrounds, a swimming beach, trails, an 18-hole golf course and campgrounds among other amenities.

== Government ==
=== State ===
At the state level, Shawnee County has frequently voted for Democratic candidates. In fact, the county has gone Democratic in eight of the last eleven gubernatorial races since 1974.

=== Presidential elections ===
Presidential election results

United States presidential election results for Shawnee County, Kansas
Year	Republican		Democratic		Third party(ies)	
Year	No.	%	No.	%	No.	%
1880	4,403	72.49%	1,548	25.49%	123	2.03%
1884	5,987	68.41%	2,482	28.36%	283	3.23%
1888	7,672	68.48%	3,143	28.05%	388	3.46%
1892	6,759	60.82%	0	0.00%	4,354	39.18%
1896	6,958	55.16%	5,536	43.89%	120	0.95%
1900	7,667	60.28%	4,875	38.33%	177	1.39%
1904	8,409	73.18%	2,441	21.24%	641	5.58%
1908	7,554	56.28%	5,585	41.61%	282	2.10%
1912	3,592	27.33%	5,094	38.76%	4,455	33.90%
1916	12,634	54.90%	9,468	41.14%	912	3.96%
1920	14,814	66.28%	7,217	32.29%	318	1.42%
1924	20,132	72.21%	5,099	18.29%	2,647	9.49%
1928	24,723	76.46%	7,433	22.99%	180	0.56%
1932	19,847	53.44%	16,471	44.35%	823	2.22%
1936	19,785	46.13%	22,942	53.49%	162	0.38%
1940	23,882	54.96%	19,375	44.59%	197	0.45%
1944	21,396	59.03%	14,678	40.49%	173	0.48%
1948	23,673	52.83%	20,346	45.41%	789	1.76%
1952	33,201	65.01%	17,651	34.56%	215	0.42%
1956	32,647	66.52%	16,298	33.21%	130	0.26%
1960	33,803	60.63%	21,799	39.10%	147	0.26%
1964	25,736	45.45%	30,626	54.09%	263	0.46%
1968	31,140	52.03%	21,735	36.32%	6,975	11.65%
1972	43,727	66.75%	20,383	31.12%	1,396	2.13%
1976	37,101	55.07%	28,578	42.42%	1,691	2.51%
1980	36,290	53.54%	24,852	36.67%	6,634	9.79%
1984	43,465	61.57%	26,338	37.31%	786	1.11%
1988	35,489	50.56%	33,940	48.35%	768	1.09%
1992	29,344	35.66%	31,972	38.86%	20,968	25.48%
1996	34,845	46.05%	32,803	43.35%	8,015	10.59%
2000	35,894	48.26%	34,818	46.82%	3,661	4.92%
2004	44,188	54.17%	36,264	44.45%	1,125	1.38%
2008	41,476	49.05%	41,235	48.77%	1,839	2.18%
2012	37,782	49.38%	36,975	48.33%	1,751	2.29%
2016	35,934	47.65%	33,926	44.99%	5,546	7.35%
2020	40,443	46.96%	43,015	49.95%	2,664	3.09%
2024	39,901	48.77%	40,308	49.26%	1,610	1.97%

Since 1992, Shawnee County has become competitive in presidential elections with a slight Republican tilt. Bill Clinton in 1992 remained the last Democratic candidate to win Shawnee County until Joe Biden won the county in 2020.

From Bob Dole in 1996 to 2016, Republicans carried the county with a plurality, with the sole exception being George W. Bush in his 2004 reelection bid. In 2008, Republican John McCain won Shawnee County over Democrat Barack Obama by a margin of 49.05% to 48.77%, a margin of 241 votes. In 2016, Donald Trump won the county against Hillary Clinton with a margin of 48% to 45.17%, a 2.83% margin, or 2,079 votes.

In 2020, Biden won Shawnee by a 3% margin, the first Democratic victory in the capital county in 28 years. His performance was the best in the county since Lyndon Johnson's 54% showing in 1964, as Clinton only managed 38% in his 1992 victory in the county. Shawnee was one of two counties to be won by Clinton once and then vote Republican before being won by Biden in 2020, the other being Hays County in Texas.

In 2024, Donald Trump became the first Republican to win a presidential election without carrying Shawnee County.

=== Laws ===
Shawnee County was a prohibition, or "dry", county until the Kansas Constitution was amended in 1986 and voters approved the sale of alcoholic liquor by the individual drink with a 30% food sales requirement. The food sales requirement was removed with voter approval in 1994.

The county voted "No" on the 2022 Kansas abortion referendum, an anti-abortion ballot measure, by 66% to 34%, outpacing its narrow support of Joe Biden during the 2020 presidential election.

== Education ==
=== Colleges and universities ===
- Washburn University
- Bethel Bible College (closed)
- College of the Sisters of Bethany (closed)

=== Vocational/technical schools ===
- Washburn Institute of Technology formerly Kaw Area Technical School

=== Unified school districts ===
- Kaw Valley USD 321 - Serving Willard and Rossville.
- Mission Valley USD 330 - Serving Dover
- Jefferson West USD 340
- Seaman USD 345 - Serving Elmont and North Topeka.
- Silver Lake USD 372 - Serving Silver Lake
- Santa Fe Trail USD 434
- Auburn-Washburn USD 437 - Serving Auburn, Wakarusa, Pauline, and Western and Southwestern Topeka.
- Shawnee Heights USD 450 - Serving Tecumseh, Berryton and Eastern and Southeastern Topeka.
- Topeka USD 501 - Serving Central Topeka

=== Public libraries ===
- Topeka & Shawnee County Public Library

=== National protected area ===
- Brown v. Board of Education National Historic Site

== Transportation ==
=== Major highways ===
- I-70
- I-335
- I-470
- US-24
- US-40
- US-75
- K-4
- Kansas Turnpike - runs along I-335, I-470 and then I-70 (east of Topeka)

=== Air ===
Forbes Field Air National Guard base and airport is south of Topeka, near Pauline. The airport was served by Allegiant Air with biweekly service to Las Vegas. Other airports in the county include Philip Billard Municipal Airport in the Oakland neighborhood of Topeka.

=== Public transportation ===
- Topeka Metro

== Communities ==
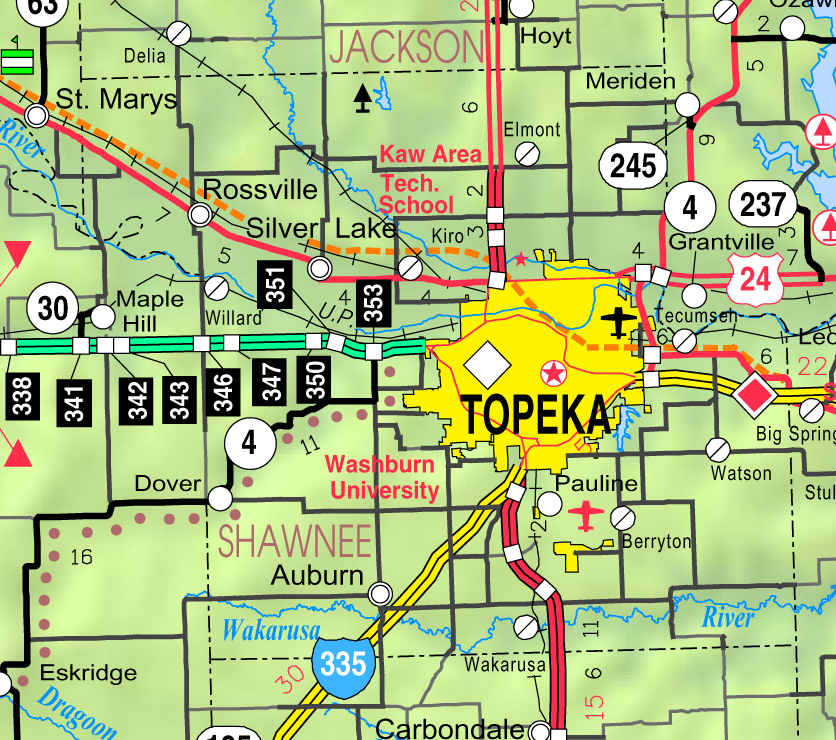
2005 map of Shawnee County (map legend)

List of townships / incorporated cities / unincorporated communities / extinct former communities within Shawnee County.

=== Cities ===
‡ means a community has portions in an adjacent county.

- Auburn
- Rossville
- Silver Lake
- Topeka (county seat and state capital)
- Willard‡

=== Unincorporated communities ===
† means a community is designated a Census-Designated Place (CDP) by the United States Census Bureau.

- Berryton
- Dover
- Elmont
- Kiro
- Montara
- Pauline
- Tecumseh†
- Wakarusa†
- Watson

=== Ghost town ===
- Richland

=== Townships ===
Shawnee County is divided into 12 townships. As a city of the first class, Topeka is considered governmentally independent and is excluded from the census figures for the townships. In the following table, the population center is the city included in that township's population total.

Township	FIPS	Population center	Population	Population density /km^{2} (/sq mi)	Land area km^{2} (sq mi)	Water area km^{2} (sq mi)	Water %	Geographic coordinates
Auburn	03275	Auburn	2,787	19 (50)	143 (55)	2 (1)	1.28%	38°54′13″N 95°49′54″W
Dover	18475	Willard	1,734	12 (31)	146 (56)	2 (1)	1.11%	39°1′33″N 95°54′1″W
Grove	29075		473	6 (16)	78 (30)	0 (0)	0.17%	39°10′16″N 95°51′47″W
Menoken	45850		1,371	12 (31)	116 (45)	1 (0)	1.00%	39°8′3″N 95°46′17″W
Mission	47275		9,070	111 (287)	82 (32)	2 (1)	2.58%	39°0′22″N 95°47′2″W
Monmouth	47700	Berryton	2,786	19 (49)	148 (57)	0 (0)	0.08%	38°55′41″N 95°35′10″W
Rossville	61425	Rossville	1,681	13 (33)	133 (51)	1 (1)	1.07%	39°8′55″N 95°57′56″W
Silver Lake	65625	Silver Lake	1,949	42 (109)	46 (18)	1 (0)	2.55%	39°6′9″N 95°51′42″W
Soldier	66225		12,867	79 (204)	163 (63)	1 (0)	0.49%	39°8′37″N 95°40′7″W
Tecumseh	70100	Tecumseh	7,822	86 (224)	91 (35)	2 (1)	2.16%	39°1′33″N 95°35′26″W
Topeka	71025	Pauline	931	32 (84)	29 (11)	1 (1)	4.89%	38°59′43″N 95°39′42″W
Williamsport	79350	Wakarusa	4,023	38 (99)	105 (41)	0 (0)	0.29%	38°55′48″N 95°41′19″W
Sources: "Census 2000 U.S. Gazetteer Files". U.S. Census Bureau, Geography Division. Archived from the original on August 2, 2002.

== See also ==
- National Register of Historic Places listings in Shawnee County, Kansas

Community information for Kansas

- Kansas locations by per capita income
- List of counties in Kansas
- List of townships in Kansas
- List of cities in Kansas
- List of unincorporated communities in Kansas
- List of ghost towns in Kansas
