= Kansas River =

River in central and northeastern Kansas, United States

Kansas River Kaw River, Padouca River, Riviere de Commanches o Padocas
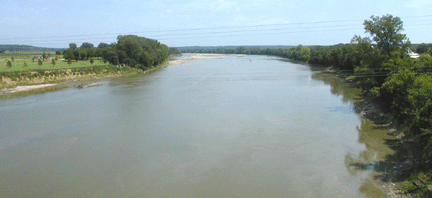
- The Kansas River at De Soto, Kansas

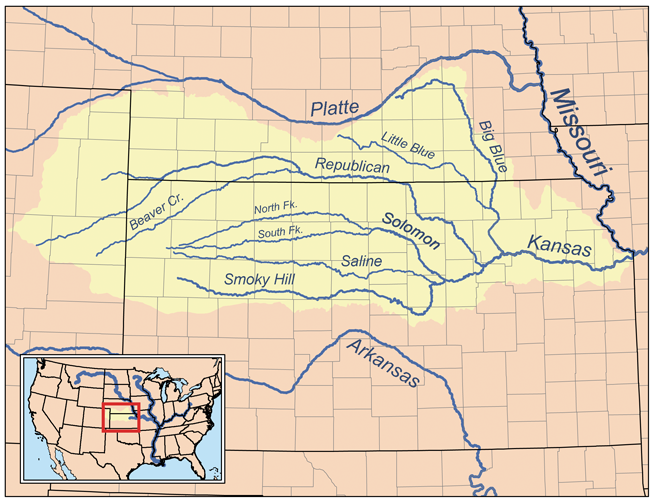
- Map of the Kansas River drainage basin

Location
- Country: United States
- State: Kansas

Physical characteristics
- Source confluence
  - location: Junction City, Kansas
  - coordinates: 39°03′35″N 96°48′04″W
  - elevation: 1,041 ft (317 m)
- Mouth: Missouri River
  - location: Kansas City, Kansas
  - coordinates: 39°06′55″N 94°36′38″W
  - elevation: 718 ft (219 m)
- Length: 174 mi (280 km)
- Basin size: 60,114 sq mi (155,690 km^{2})
- Discharge
  - average: 7,240 cu ft/s (205 m^{3}/s)
  - minimum: 353 cu ft/s (10.0 m^{3}/s)
  - maximum: 133,172 cu ft/s (3,771.0 m^{3}/s)

Basin features
- Tributaries
  - left: Republican River, Big Blue River, Delaware River
  - right: Smoky Hill River, Wakarusa River

The Kansas River, also known as the Kaw, is a meandering river in northeastern Kansas in the United States. It is potentially the southwestern most part of the Missouri River drainage, which is sometimes in turn the northwesternmost portion of the extensive Mississippi River drainage. Its two names both come from the Kanza (Kaw) people who once inhabited the area; Kansas was one of the anglicizations of the French transcription Cansez (IPA: [kɑ̃ze]) of the original kką:ze. The city of Kansas City, Missouri, was named for the river, as was later the state of Kansas.

The river valley averages 2.6 miles (4.2 km) in width, with the widest points being between Wamego and Rossville, where it is up to 4 miles (6.4 km) wide, then narrowing to 1 mile (1.6 km) or less in places below Eudora and De Soto. Much of the river's watershed is dammed for flood control, but the Kansas River is generally free-flowing and has only minor obstructions, including diversion weirs and one low-impact hydroelectric dam.

== Course ==
Beginning at the confluence of the Republican and Smoky Hill rivers, just east of aptly named Junction City (1,040 feet or 320 metres), the Kansas River flows some 148 miles (238 km) generally eastward to join the Missouri River at Kaw Point (718 feet or 219 metres) in Kansas City, Kansas. Dropping 322 feet (98 m) on its journey seaward, the water in the Kansas River falls less than 2 feet per mile (38 cm/km). The Kansas River valley is only 115 miles (185 km) long; the surplus length of the river is due to meandering across the floodplain. The river's course roughly follows the maximum extent of a Pre-Illinoian glaciation, and the river likely began as a path of glacial meltwater drainage.

== Drainage ==
The Kansas River at Lawrence showing Bowersock Dam and the U.S. 40 and 59 Bridges

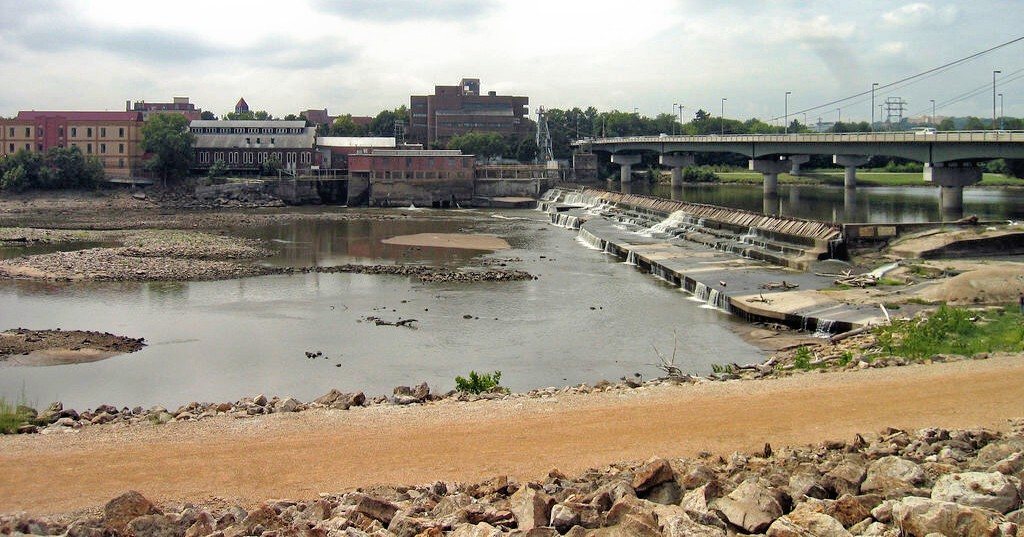
At low level

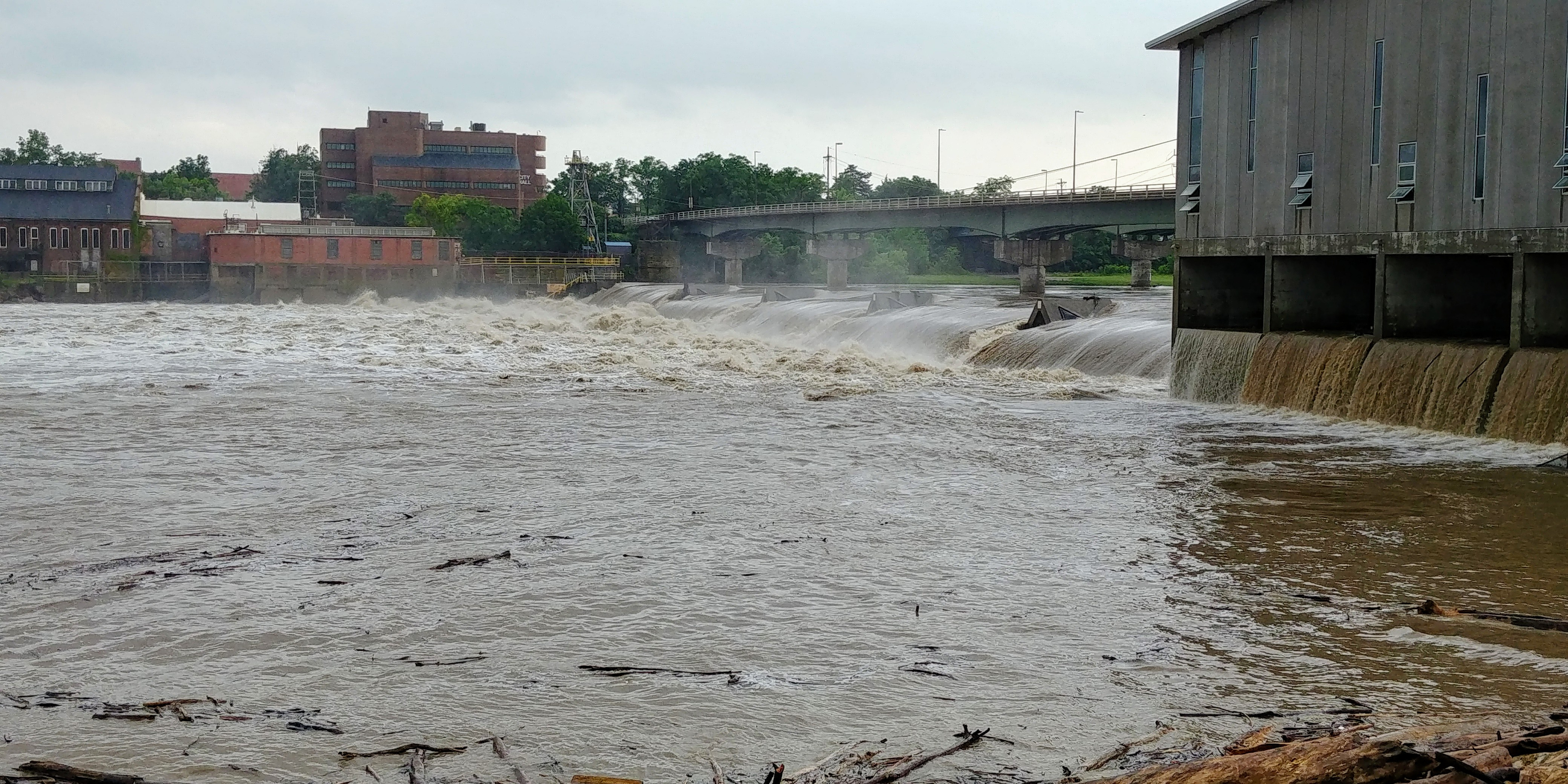
At flood stage

The Kansas drains 34,423 square miles (89,160 km^{2}) of land in Kansas (almost all of the northern half), along with 16,916 square miles (43,810 km^{2}) in Nebraska and 8,775 square miles (22,730 km^{2}) in Colorado, making a total of just over 60,000 square miles (160,000 km^{2}). When including the Republican River and its headwater tributaries, the Kansas River system has a length of 743 miles (1,196 km), making it the 21st longest river system in the United States. Its highest headwaters are at about 6,000 feet (1,800 m) and extend nearly to Limon, Colorado. Much of the drainage of the river lies within the Great Plains, but the river itself exists entirely within the Mid-Continent Region. The majority of the rest of the state is drained by the Arkansas (and its tributaries, the Neosho, Cimarron, and Verdigris, all three of which drain into the Arkansas in Oklahoma). A portion of central-eastern Kansas is drained by the Marais des Cygnes River, which flows into Missouri to meet the Missouri River. A small area in the extreme northeast part of the state drains directly into the Missouri. In the Kansas City metro area, some streams drain east into the Blue River tributary of the Missouri.

== Geology ==
The Kansas River flows through what is known as the Stable Interior region. Since this region is near the center of the North American Plate, it has not experienced any extensive geologic faulting, folding, or mountain building in recent geologic time. From the confluence at Junction City, the river flows through limestone, shale, mudstone, and occasional sandstone strata that, except for diagenesis, remain largely undisturbed since deposition in shallow Carboniferous and Permian seas. The age of the rock exposed by the river becomes progressively older as the river moves downstream for two main reasons. First, downstream areas experience more erosion from increased flow, and second because the slight uplift of the Ozark dome to the southeast caused the strata in Kansas to dip very slightly to the west. The Smoky Hill River and Republican River tributaries reach far to the west into the Cretaceous deposits of the Western Interior Seaway and the Neogene Period deposits of material from the uplift of the Rocky Mountains, which created the Ogallala Formation.

All of the rocks in the eastern Kansas valley are sedimentary, ranging from Late Pennsylvanian (300 million years ago) through the Permian, with three notable exceptions from the Quaternary Period. The first is river sand and gravel deposits, which have been carried in largely from erosion of the Ogallala and Cretaceous rocks by the western extents of the Kansas River tributaries. Second, the retreat of the Kansan glaciation left behind a combination of ice- and meltwater-deposited sediments known as drifta, a poorly sorted mixture of clay, sand, gravel, and even large boulders that cover parts the Kansas River basin from the Big Blue River and eastward. The third is loess, a fine silt that may have originally been deposited by the melting water of the receding glaciers, then redeposited by the wind. The thickest loess deposits can be found in the northwest and north-central part of the Kansas River basin from southern Nebraska into northwest Kansas, as well as near the river's mouth.

== History ==
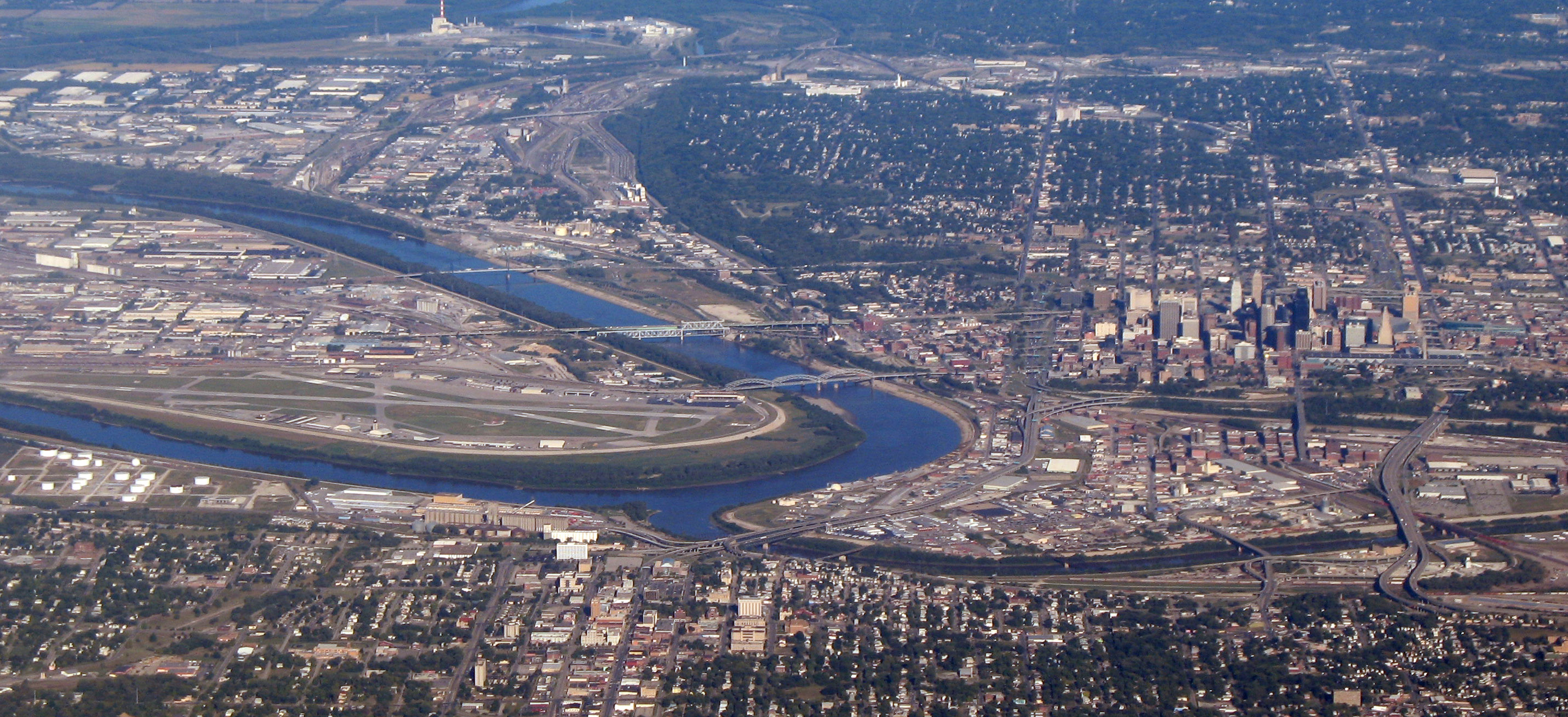
The Kansas River in confluence with the Missouri in Kansas City, Kansas with Kansas City, Missouri in the background.

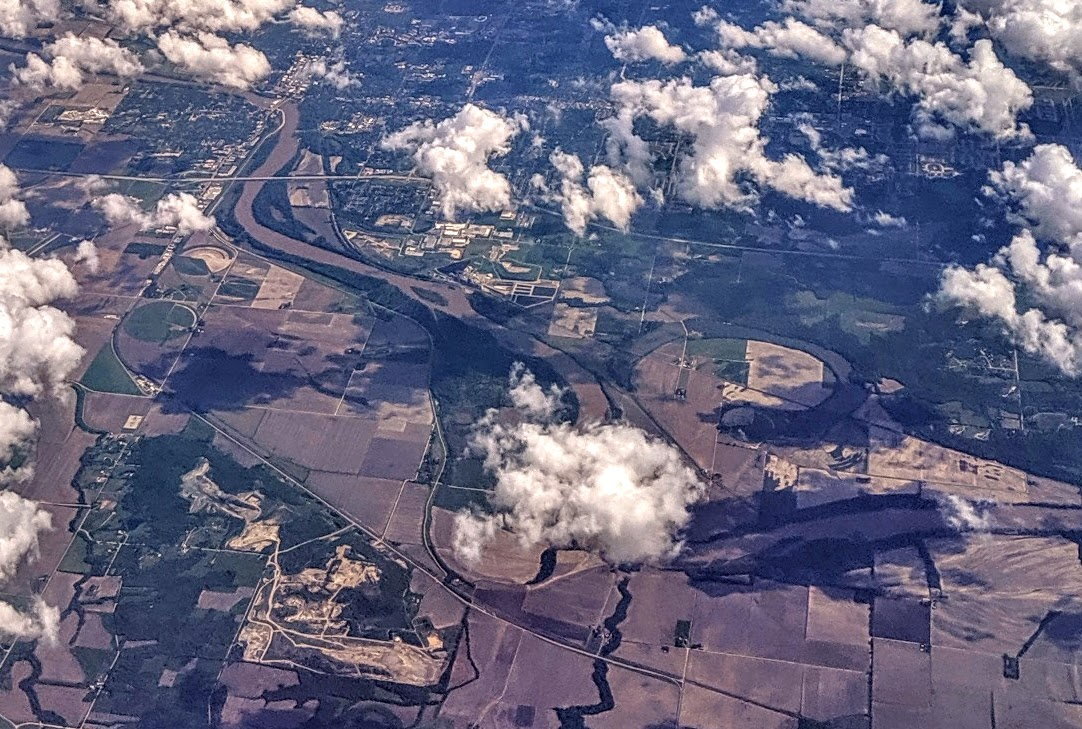
The Kansas River at Lawrence, Kansas, aerial view from the north with Lake View Lake (the oxbow lake in the right foreground) and I-70 crossing

The first map showing the Kansas River is French cartographer Guillaume de L'Isle's "Carte de la Louisiane," which was drawn about 1718. On it, the "Grande Riviere des Cansez" flows into the Missouri River at about the 39th parallel. This map, with virtually no changes except for the translation of French into English, was subsequently published by John Senex, a London cartographer and engraver, in 1721.

From June 26 through 29, 1804, the Lewis and Clark Expedition camped at Kaw Point at the Kansas River's mouth. They praised the scenery in their accounts and noted the area would be a good location for a fort.

In August 1819, Maj. Stephen H. Long steered the first steamer into the Kansas River with his 30-ton boat Western Engineer. He made it scarcely a mile up the river before turning back, citing mud bars from the recent floods.

The mouth of the Kansas River in the West Bottoms area of Kansas City (at a longitude of 94 degrees 36 minutes West) was the basis for Missouri's western boundary from Iowa to Arkansas when it became a state in 1821 (Kansas entered the Union in 1861.) South of the Missouri River, that longitude still remains the boundary between Kansas and Missouri. North of the Missouri River, the state of Missouri extended its boundary further to the west in 1836 with the Platte Purchase. The river has moved slightly since this designation, but the state boundary has remained the same. This line is known as the Osage Boundary.

From the 1840s through the early 1870s, the southern ridgelines of the lower section of the Kansas River were the beginnings of the Oregon, California, and Santa Fe trails as they left Kansas City.

Beginning in 1854, steamboats operated regularly from Kansas City to Lawrence and Topeka, and sometimes as far as Manhattan, Junction City, and Fort Riley. This traffic continued through the territorial period and the early years of statehood, falling off rapidly about 1860. The last steamer to travel the Kansas was the Alexander Majors, which was chartered in 1866 to run between Kansas City and Lawrence until the railroad bridge at the mouth of the river, which had been destroyed by floods, could be rebuilt. This traffic into statehood gave the Kansas legal status as a navigable stream in the eyes of the Federal government. In the 1860s, the country's goods were increasingly transported by the extensive and comparatively efficient railroad system.

On February 25, 1864, the state legislature declared the Kansas River nonnavigable, allowing railroad and bridge companies to build bridges and dams without restriction. The first train to operate in Kansas south of the Kansas River did so by crossing the river in Lawrence on November 1, 1867. This law remained in effect until 1913, when, after it had been characterized as "a crime against the public welfare of Kansas", it was finally repealed and the river's status was restored to a navigable stream. The status has not since changed, though modern commercial navigation on the river is largely confined to dredging.

== Recreation ==
Recreation along the Kansas River includes fishing, canoeing and kayaking, and rowing. There are 18 public access points along the river. The Friends of the Kaw organizes many float trips down the river each year (as well as cleanup efforts), and the Lawrence KOA rents canoes for self-guided trips. At least two rowing teams regularly use the river: The University of Kansas rowing team uses the pool above the Bowersock Dam for their training, and the Kansas City Boat Club as well as University of Missouri-Kansas City rows in the final stretches of the river, near its mouth and the connection to the Missouri River.

== River modifications ==
=== On the river ===
- Kansas City: A few yards downstream from the I-435 bridge, a weir diverts water to an intake for WaterOne. Portage access is on the left bank.
- Lawrence: Bowersock Dam is the largest obstruction on the river. It serves not only to create a standing pool for one of Lawrence's municipal water intakes (the other is at Clinton Lake), but also to create a head for the Bowersock Mills & Power Company. At this site, the Bowersock Mills & Power Company operates the only hydroelectric power station in Kansas: a 2.5-megawatt low-impact hydropower facility. The University of Kansas's rowing team uses the pool for its exercises. Portage access is on the left bank.
- Tecumseh: An easily navigable low head weir diverts water to the Tecumseh power plant, just downstream from Topeka.
- Topeka: A Topeka water department dam diverts water to the right bank for a municipal water intake. Portage access is on the left bank.

=== Within the watershed ===
The U.S. Army Corps of Engineers and the Bureau of Land Management operate many reservoirs within the watershed of the Kansas River for local and Mississippi River flood control, with secondary recreational uses.

== In popular culture ==
The river is featured prominently in the 2017 documentary When Kings Reigned. The film talks about life along the Kansas River in the late 1800s, and the trials that the fishermen on the river faced.

Étienne de Veniard Sieur de Bourgmont's expedition into the Kansas River valley and the history of the Kanza people in their villages along the river is discussed in The Last Wild Places of Kansas, a book by George Frazier.

In Sara Paretsky's 2017 detective novel "Fallout", in which Paretsky's Chicago-based private detective V.I. Warshawski carries out an investigation in Lawrence, Kansas, a Lawrence resident tells her: "You should always say 'The Kaw' when you speak of our river. Only strangers and Google Maps call it 'The Kansas River'"(Ch. 32).

Johnny Kaw is a fictional Kansas settler created in a series of tall tale publications started in 1955 — one of his fictional feats was to have dug the Kansas River Valley.

The "Kaw River" is mentioned as a location in the western series Wagon Train, in the opening scene of The Tom Tuckett Story episode (March 2, 1960).

== Places and locations along the river ==
(Listed from mouth upstream)

=== Counties ===
- Wyandotte and Johnson (boundary in part)
- Jefferson and Douglas (boundary)
- Shawnee
- Pottawatomie and Wabaunsee (boundary)
- Riley
- Geary

=== Cities and towns ===
City	Elevation	
City	ft	m
Kansas City	730	220
Shawnee	732	223
Edwardsville	741	226
Bonner Springs	762	232
De Soto	764	233
Lawrence	791	241
Lecompton	820	250
Perry	820	250
Tecumseh	840	260
Topeka	852	260
Willard	889	271
Belvue	911	278
Wamego	955	291
St. George	977	298
Manhattan	990	300
Ogden	1,023	312
Ft. Riley	1,040	320
Junction City	1,047	319
Boldface denotes a major city

=== Tributaries ===
- Wakarusa River
- Big Blue River
- Republican River
- Smoky Hill River
- Delaware River

== See also ==
- List of rivers of Kansas
