= Pauline, Kansas =

Unincorporated community in Shawnee County, Kansas, United States

- Unincorporated community
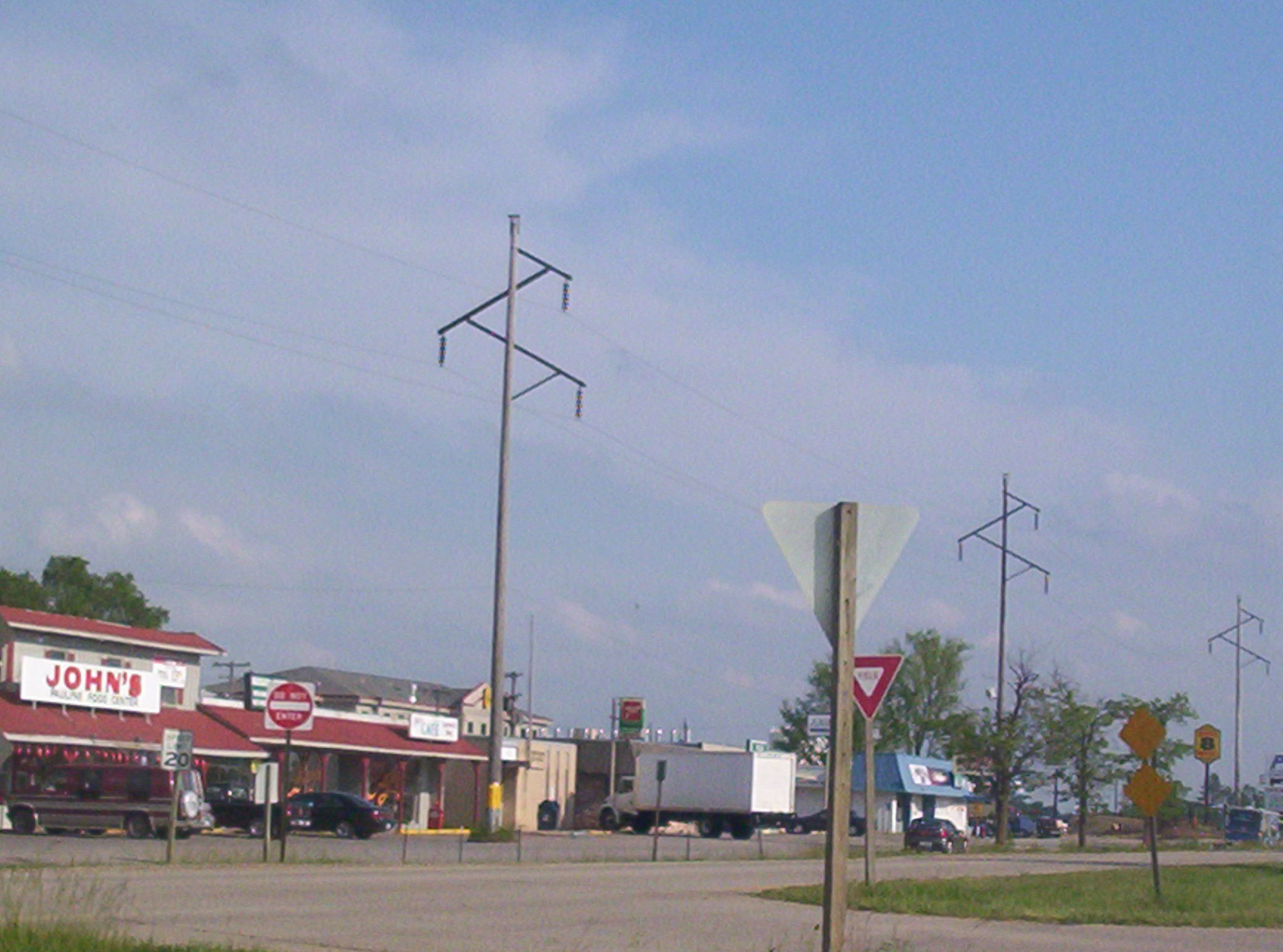
- Pauline (2005)

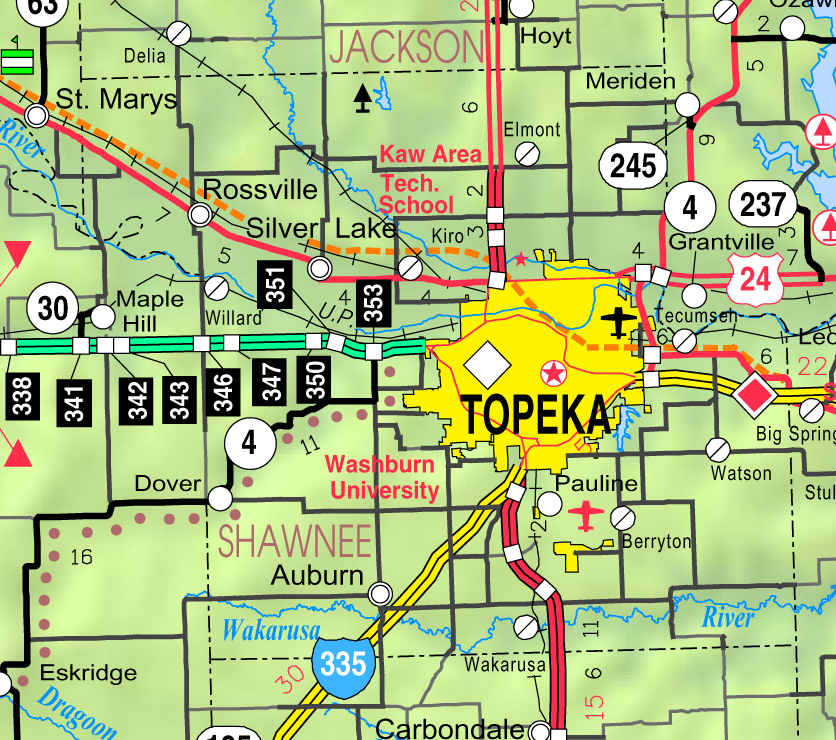
- KDOT map of Shawnee County (legend)

- Location within Kansas Location within the United States
- Coordinates: 38°57′48″N 95°41′26″W
- Country: United States
- State: Kansas
- County: Shawnee
- Elevation: 1,027 ft (313 m)
- Time zone: UTC-6 (CST)
  - Summer (DST): UTC-5 (CDT)
- Area code: 785
- FIPS code: 20-54750
- GNIS ID: 479073

Pauline is an unincorporated community in Shawnee County, Kansas, United States. Located south of Topeka, it lies next to Forbes Field on southwest Topeka Boulevard. It is occasionally seen as part of the South City Industry Park for Topeka with its many large businesses.

== History ==
The first post office in Pauline was established in 1872.

Pauline was a stop on the Atchison, Topeka and Santa Fe Railway and had a depot, completed in 1910. The depot was relocated to Old Prairie Town at Historic Ward-Meade Historic Site in Topeka in 1983.

There are about 30 houses along with about 20 mobile homes in the mobile home park. Businesses there include three restaurants, two gas stations, an auction house, a bar, a laundromat, and a grocery store. Pauline also has a Super 8 Motel and a modern campground with hook-ups.

== See also ==
- Old Prairie Town at Ward-Meade Historic Site
- Topeka metropolitan area
