= Blacksmith (disambiguation) =

A blacksmith is an artisan specializing in the hand-wrought manufacture of ferrous (iron) metal objects.

Blacksmith may also refer to:

== Geography in the United States ==
- Blacksmith Creek, a river in Kansas
- Blacksmith Run, a stream in Pennsylvania

== Music ==
- Blacksmith Records, a record label founded by New York rapper Talib Kweli
- Blacksmith (musical group), a British record production and remixing trio
- Black Smith (album), a 1974 album by Jimmy Smith
- "Blacksmith" (song), an English folk song

== Film ==
- Les Forgerons or The Blacksmiths, an 1895 French film directed by Louis Lumière
- The Blacksmith, a 1922 film starring Buster Keaton
- The Blacksmith (1944 film), a Mexican film

== Fictional characters and places ==
- Blacksmith (character), a DC Comics character and villain of the Flash
- Blacksmith (comics), a Marvel Comics character
- Blacksmith, a character in the animated series Adventure Time
- Blacksmith, a fictional town in the 1985 novel White Noise

== Other uses ==
- Black' Smith, a South Korean restaurant chain
- Blacksmith (fish), a fish native to the eastern Pacific Ocean
- Henkka Seppälä (born 1980), Finnish bassist nicknamed "Blacksmith"

== See also ==
- Blacksmith Institute, an anti-pollution non-profit organization
- Blacksmith Scene, an 1893 Kinetoscope film shot in Thomas Edison's Black Maria studio
- Blacksmiths, New South Wales, a suburb of Lake Macquarie in New South Wales, Australia
