= Topeka Township =

Township in Shawnee County, Kansas, U.S.

- Township
- Location within Shawnee County
- Coordinates: 38.978222°N 95.660742°W
- Country: United States
- State: Kansas
- County: Shawnee
- Established: 1857

Government
  - Township Trustee: Chad Baldwin

Area
  - Total: 10.082 sq mi (26.11 km^{2})
  - Land: 9.413 sq mi (24.38 km^{2})
  - Water: 0.669 sq mi (1.73 km^{2}) 6.64%

Population (2020)
  - Total: 791
  - Density: 84.0/sq mi (32.4/km^{2})
- Time zone: UTC-6 (CST)
  - Summer (DST): UTC-5 (CDT)
- Area code: 785
- GNIS feature ID: 479102

Topeka Township is a township in Shawnee County, Kansas, United States. As of the 2020 census, its population was 791.

== History ==
Topeka Township was first organized on February 23, 1857. The first settler in what would become Topeka Township was Clement Shattio, a Frenchman from St. Louis, who settled there on November 15, 1852. Dover Township was organized from part of Topeka Township on October 1, 1860. Mission Township was created from part of Topeka Township in 1871.

== Geography ==
Topeka Township covers an area of 10.082 square miles (26.11 square kilometers). Most of Lake Shawnee lies within the township. The Kansas River flows through it, as well as Shunganunga Creek, Lynn Creek, and Deer Creek.

=== Communities ===
- Pauline

=== Adjacent townships ===
Soldier Township, Shawnee County
		north
Mission Township, Shawnee County	west	self	east	Tecumseh Township, Shawnee County
		south	southeast	Monmouth Township, Shawnee County
Williamsport Township, Shawnee County

== Transportation ==
Part of Topeka Regional Airport lies within the township.

=== Major highways ===
- I-335 / Kansas Turnpike
- I-470 / Kansas Turnpike
- US-75
