= Soldier Township, Shawnee County, Kansas =

Township in Shawnee County, Kansas, U.S.

Soldier Township
- Township
- Location within Shawnee County
- Coordinates: 39°09′17″N 95°39′40″W
- Country: United States
- State: Kansas
- County: Shawnee
- Established: 1860

Government
  - Township Trustee: Chad Gerhardt

Area
  - Total: 63.224 sq mi (163.75 km^{2})
  - Land: 62.321 sq mi (161.41 km^{2})
  - Water: 0.903 sq mi (2.34 km^{2}) 1.43%
- Elevation: 968 ft (295 m)

Population (2020)
  - Total: 15,109
  - Density: 242.44/sq mi (93.606/km^{2})
- Time zone: UTC-6 (CST)
  - Summer (DST): UTC-5 (CDT)
- Area code: 785
- GNIS feature ID: 478472
- Website: soldiertownship.com

Soldier Township is a township in northeastern Shawnee County, Kansas, United States. As of the 2020 census, its population was 15,109.

== History ==
Soldier Township was established on April 20, 1860 from part of Topeka Township. The Great Flood of 1844 covered the area 20 feet (6.1 m) deep. The first settlers in what would become Soldier Township were Fred Swice and George L. Young, who settled there in 1850. The now extinct town of Indianola was founded in November of 1854, but went extinct due to being eclipsed by Topeka. On March 16, 1868, Silver Lake Township was organized from part of Soldier Township. The northern part of Soldier Township was a part of Calhoun County until that was disestablished in 1859. It then became part of Jackson County until 1860.

The township was platted in April 1887.

In World War II, a local factory supplied the military, and then Goodyear Tire and Rubber Company bought it.

The modern township's government's main purpose is road maintenance and fire protection services. It is served by Seaman USD 345 school district in neighboring Topeka, Kansas.

== Geography ==
Soldier Township covers an area of 63.224 square miles (163.75 square kilometers). The Kansas River, Soldier Creek, and Halfday Creek flow through it, as well as Muddy Creek, Elm Creek, and Indian Creek.

=== Communities ===
- Elmont

=== Adjacent townships ===
Douglas Township, Jackson County
		north	northeast	Rock Creek Township, Jefferson County
Menoken Township, Shawnee County	west	self	east	Kaw Township, Jefferson County
		south	southeast	Tecumseh Township, Shawnee County
Topeka Township, Shawnee County

== Transportation ==
=== Major highways ===
- US-24
- US-75
- K-4
