= List of comic book supervillain debuts =

A gathering of Batman's foes. Art by Jim Lee.

The following is a list of first appearances of supervillains and teams in American comic books.

For a list of comic book superhero debuts, see List of superhero debuts.

== 1930s ==
Character / Team	Year Debuted	Company	Creator/s	First Appearance
Ultra-Humanite	1939 (June)	DC	Jerry Siegel, Joe Shuster	Action Comics (vol. 1) #13
Dr. Death	1939 (July)	DC	Bob Kane, Bill Finger	Detective Comics (vol. 1) #29
The Monk	1939 (September)	DC	Bob Kane, Bill Finger	Detective Comics (vol. 1) #31
The Claw	1939 (December)	Lev Gleason Publications	Jack Cole	Silver Streak Comics #1

== 1940s ==
Character / Team	Year Debuted	Company	Creator/s	First Appearance
Hath-Set	1940 (January)	DC	Gardner Fox, Dennis Neville	Flash Comics #1
Hugo Strange	1940 (February)	DC	Bob Kane, Bill Finger	Detective Comics (vol. 1) #36
Doctor Sivana	1940 (February)	Fawcett Comics/DC	Bill Parker, C. C. Beck	Whiz Comics #2
Lex Luthor	1940 (April)	DC	Jerry Siegel, Joe Shuster	Action Comics (vol. 1) #23
The Joker	1940 (April)	DC	Bob Kane, Jerry Robinson, Bill Finger	Batman (vol. 1) #1
Catwoman	1940 (April)	DC	Bob Kane, Bill Finger	Batman (vol. 1) #1
Tony Zucco	1940 (April)	DC	Bob Kane, Bill Finger, Jerry Robinson	Detective Comics (vol. 1) #38
Clayface	1940 (June)	DC	Bob Kane, Bill Finger	Detective Comics (vol. 1) #40
Scarecrow	1941 (September)	DC	Bill Finger, Bob Kane	World's Finest Comics #3
Ares	1941 (October)	DC	William Moulton Marston, H. G. Peter	Wonder Woman #1
Red Skull	1941 (October)	Marvel/Timely	Joe Simon, Jack Kirby	Captain America Comics #1
The Penguin	1941 (December)	DC	Bob Kane, Bill Finger	Detective Comics (vol. 1) #58
Captain Nazi	1941 (December)	Fawcett Comics/DC	Bill Woolfolk, Mac Raboy	Master Comics #21
Ibac	1942 (March)	Fawcett Comics/DC	Otto Binder, C. C. Beck	Captain Marvel Adventures #8
The Puzzler	1942 (June)	DC		Action Comics (vol. 1) #49
Two-Face	1942 (August)	DC	Bob Kane, Bill Finger	Detective Comics (vol. 1) #66
Prankster	1942 (August)	DC	Jerry Siegel, John Sikela	Action Comics (vol. 1) #51
The Shade	1942 (September)	DC	Gardner Fox	Flash Comics #33
Rag Doll	1942 (December)	DC	Gardner Fox	Flash Comics #36
Sabbac	(Fawcett) 1943; (DC) 2007	Fawcett Comics/DC	(Fawcett) Otto Binder, Al Carreno; (DC) Judd Winick, Tom Raney	(Fawcett) Captain Marvel, Jr. #4; (DC) Outsiders, vol. 3 #8
Mister Mind	1943	Fawcett Comics/DC	Otto Binder, C. C. Beck	Captain Marvel Adventures #22
Brain Wave	1943 (February)	DC	Gardner Fox	All Star #15
Tweedledum and Tweedledee	1943 (April)	DC	Bob Kane, Jerry Robinson, Bob Cameron	Detective Comics (vol. 1) #74
Crime Doctor	1943 (July)	DC	Bill Finger, Bob Kane, George Roussos	Detective Comics (vol. 1) #77
Toyman	1943 (September)	DC	Jerry Siegel, Joe Shuster	Action Comics (vol. 1) #64
Cheetah	1943 (September)	DC	William Moulton Marston	Wonder Woman (vol. 1) #6
Thinker	1943 (October)	DC	Gardner Fox, E. E. Hibbard	All-Flash #12
Cavalier	1943 (November)	DC	Don Cameron, Bob Kane	Detective Comics (vol. 1) #81
Vandal Savage	1943 (December)	DC	Alfred Bester, Martin Nodell	Green Lantern (vol. 1) #10
Gambler	1944	DC	Henry Kuttner, Martin Nodell	Green Lantern (vol. 1) #12
Giganta	1944 (June)	DC	William Moulton Marston	Wonder Woman (vol. 1) #9
Mr. Mxyzptlk	1944 (September)	DC	Jerry Siegel, Joe Shuster	Superman (vol. 1) #30
Solomon Grundy	1944 (October)	DC	Alfred Bester, Paul Reinman	All-American Comics #61
Monocle	1945 (April)	DC	Gardner Fox, Joe Kubert	Flash Comics #64
Turtle	1945 (December)	DC	Gardner Fox, Martin Naydel	All-Star #21
Black Adam	1945 (December)	Fawcett Comics/DC	Otto Binder & C. C. Beck	The Marvel Family #1
Crazy Quilt	1946 (June)	DC	Jack Kirby	Boy Commandos #15
Wizard	1947 (April)	DC	Gardner Fox, Irwin Hasen	All Star Comics #34
Penny Plunderer	1947 (September)	DC		World's Finest Comics #30
Gentleman Ghost	1947 (October)	DC	Robert Kanigher, Joe Kubert	Flash Comics #88
Icicle (comics) (Joar Mahkent)	1947 (October)	DC	Robert Kanigher, Irwin Hasen	All American Comics #90
Rose and Thorn	1947 (November)	DC	John Broome, Carmine Infantino	Flash Comics #89
Fiddler	1947 (December)	DC	Robert Kanigher, Lee Elias	All-Flash #32
Star Sapphire	1947 (December)	DC	Robert Kanigher, Lee Elias	All-Flash #32
Mad Hatter	1948 (October)	DC	Bob Kane, Bill Finger	Batman (vol. 1) #49
Riddler	1948 (October)	DC	Bill Finger, Dick Sprang	Detective Comics (vol. 1) #140
The Rival	1949 (February)	DC	John Broome, Joe Kubert	Flash Comics #104

== 1950s ==
Character / Team	Year Debuted	Company	Creator/s	First Appearance
Deadshot	1950 (June)	DC	Bob Kane, David Vern Reed, Lew Schwartz	Batman (vol. 1) #59
The Mekon	1950		Frank Hampson	Dan Dare, Pilot of the Future
Red Hood	1951 (February)	DC		Detective Comics #168
Killer Moth	1951 (February)	DC		Batman #63
Firefly	1952 (June)	DC	France Herron, Dick Sprang	Detective Comics #184
Gorilla-Man	1954	Marvel/Timely	Bob Powell	Mystery Tales #21
Morgan le Fay	1955	Marvel/Timely	Stan Lee, Joe Maneely	Black Knight comics #1
The Yellow Claw	1956	Marvel/Timely	Al Feldstein, Joe Maneely	Yellow Claw comics #1
Captain Cold	1957 (May)	DC	John Broome, Carmine Infantino	Showcase #8
Professor Milo	1957 (September)	DC		Detective Comics #247
Signalman	1957 (December)	DC		Batman #112
Brainiac	1958 (July)	DC	Curt Swan, Stan Kaye	Action Comics (vol. 1) #242
Bizarro	1958 (October)	DC	Otto Binder, George Papp	Superboy (vol. 1) #68
Terrible Trio (DC Comics) (Fox, Shark, Vulture)	1958 (March)	DC	Dave Wood, Sheldon Moldoff	Detective Comics (vol. 1) #253
Calendar Man	1958 (September)	DC	Bill Finger	Detective Comics (vol. 1) #259
Doctor Double X	1958 (November)	DC		Detective Comics (vol. 1) #261
Titano	1959 (February)	DC	Otto Binder, Curt Swan	Superman (vol. 1) #127
Mr. Freeze (originally Mr. Zero)	1959 (February)	DC	Bob Kane	Batman (vol. 1) #121
Doctor Alchemy (originally as Mr. Element)	1959 (March)	DC	John Broome, Carmine Infantino	Showcase #19
Mirror Master	1959 (March)	DC	John Broome, Carmine Infantino	The Flash (vol. 1) #105
Gorilla Grodd	1959 (April)	DC	John Broome, Carmine Infantino	The Flash (vol. 1) #106
Metallo	1959 (May)	DC	Robert Bernstein, Al Plastino	Action Comics (vol. 1) #252
Pied Piper	1959 (May)	DC	John Broome, Carmine Infantino	The Flash (vol. 1) #106
Molten Man-Thing	1959 (September)	Marvel	Stan Lee, Jack Kirby, Steve Ditko	Tales of Suspense #7
Suicide Squad (Rick Flag Jr., Jess Bright, Dr. Hugh Evans, Karin Grace)	1959 (September)	DC	Robert Kanigher, Ross Andru	The Brave and the Bold (vol. 1) #25
Weather Wizard	1959 (December)	DC	John Broome, Carmine Infantino	The Flash (vol. 1) #110

== 1960s ==
Character / Team	Year Debuted	Company	Creator/s	First Appearance
Grottu	1960 (February)	Marvel	Jack Kirby, Bill Everett	Strange Tales #73
Starro	1960 (February)	DC	Gardner Fox	The Brave and the Bold (vol. 1) #28
Amazo	1960 (June)	DC	Gardner Fox	The Brave and the Bold (vol. 1) #30
Professor Ivo	1960 (June)	DC	Gardner Fox, Mike Sekowsky	The Brave and the Bold (vol. 1) #30
Trickster	1960 (June)	DC	John Broome, Carmine Infantino	The Flash (vol. 1) #113
Clock King	1960 (August)	DC	France Herron, Lee Elias	World's Finest Comics #111
Kryptonite Man	1960 (September)	DC		Superboy (vol. 1) #83
Despero	1960 (October)	DC	Gardner Fox, Mike Sekowsky	Justice League of America (vol. 1) #1
Gorgilla	1960 (October)	Marvel	Stan Lee, Jack Kirby	Tales To Astonish #12
Xemnu	1960 (November)	Marvel	Stan Lee, Jack Kirby	Journey into Mystery #62
Captain Boomerang	1960 (December)	DC	John Broome, Carmine Infantino	The Flash (vol. 1) #117
Elektro	1961 (January)	Marvel	Stan Lee, Jack Kirby	Tales of Suspense #13
Byth Rok	1961 (February)	DC	Gardner Fox, Joe Kubert	The Brave and the Bold vol. 1 #34
Hyathis	1961 (February)	DC	Gardner Fox	Justice League of America vol. 1 #3
Kanjar Ro	1961 (February)	DC	Gardner Fox	Justice League of America vol. 1 #3
Hector Hammond	1961 (March)	DC	Gil Kane, John Broome	Green Lantern vol. 2 #5
Goom	1961 (March)	Marvel	Stan Lee, Dick Ayers, Jack Kirby	Tales of Suspense #15
Matter Master	1961 (April)	DC	Gardner Fox, Joe Kubert	The Brave and the Bold (vol. 1) #35
General Zod	1961 (April)	DC	Robert Bernstein, George Papp	Adventure Comics (vol. 1) #283
Googam	1961 (May)	Marvel	Stan Lee, Steve Ditko	Tales of Suspense #17
Spragg	1961 (May)	Marvel	attributed to Stan Lee, Jack Kirby	Journey into Mystery #68
Doctor Destiny	1961 (June)	DC		Justice League of America vol. 1 #5
Shadow Thief	1961 (June)	DC	Gardner Fox, Joe Kubert	The Brave and the Bold vol. 1 #36
Amos Fortune	1961 (August)	DC	Gardner Fox	Justice League of America vol. 1 #6
Legion of Super-Villains	1961 (August)	DC	Jerry Siegel, Curt Swan	Superman vol. 1 #147
Sinestro	1961 (August)	DC	John Broome, Gil Kane	Green Lantern (vol. 2) #7
The Top	1961 (August)	DC	John Broome, Carmine Infantino	The Flash (comic book) vol. 1 #122
Fin Fang Foom	1961 (October)	Marvel	Stan Lee, Jack Kirby	Strange Tales #89
Jax-Ur	1961 (October)	DC		Adventure Comics #289
Mole Man	1961 (November)	Marvel	Stan Lee, Jack Kirby	Fantastic Four vol. 1 #1
Matt Hagen	1961 (December)	DC	Bill Finger, Sheldon Moldoff	Detective Comics #298
Skrulls	1962 (January)	Marvel	Stan Lee, Jack Kirby	Fantastic Four vol. 1 #2
Polka-Dot Man	1962 (February)	DC	Bill Finger, Sheldon Moldoff	Detective Comics #300
Tim Boo Ba	1962 (February)	Marvel	Stan Lee, Steve Ditko	Amazing Adult Fantasy #9
Felix Faust	1962 (March)	DC	Gardner Fox, Mike Sekowsky	Justice League of America (vol. 1) #10
Miracle Man	1962 (March)	Marvel	Stan Lee, Jack Kirby	Fantastic Four vol. 1 #3
Gargoyle	1962 (May)	Marvel	Stan Lee, Jack Kirby	Incredible Hulk vol. 1 #1
Doctor Light (Arthur Light)	1962 (June)	DC	Gardner Fox, Mike Sekowsky	Justice League of America (vol. 1) #12
Floronic Man	1962 (June)	DC	Gardner Fox, Gil Kane	Atom #1
Doctor Doom	1962 (July)	Marvel	Stan Lee, Jack Kirby	Fantastic Four vol. 1 #5
Yancy Street Gang	1962 (September)	Marvel	Stan Lee, Jack Kirby	Fantastic Four vol. 1 #6
Destroyer	1962 (October)	Marvel	Stan Lee, Jack Kirby	Strange Tales #101
Kurrgo, Master of Planet X	1962 (October)	Marvel	Stan Lee, Jack Kirby	Fantastic Four vol. 1 #7
Loki	1962 (October)	Marvel	Stan Lee, Larry Lieber	Journey into Mystery #85
Ringmaster	1962 (October)	Marvel	Stan Lee, Steve Ditko	The Incredible Hulk #3
The Puppet Master	1962 (November)	Marvel	Stan Lee, Jack Kirby	Fantastic Four vol. 1 #8
Wizard	1962 (November)	Marvel	Stan Lee, Jack Kirby	Strange Tales #102
Warlord Zemu	1962 (December)	Marvel	Stan Lee, Jack Kirby	Strange Tales #103
Egghead	1962 (December)	Marvel	Stan Lee, Jack Kirby	Tales to Astonish #38
Abra Kadabra	1962	DC	John Broome, Carmine Infantino	The Flash vol. 1 #128
Chronos	1962	DC	Gardner Fox, Gil Kane	The Atom #3
Doctor Polaris	1962	DC		Green Lantern vol. 2 #21
Qwsp	1962	DC		Aquaman vol. 1 #1
Sonar	1962	DC	John Broome, Gil Kane	Green Lantern vol. 2 #14
Star Sapphire	1962	DC	John Broome, Gil Kane	As Carol Ferris: Showcase #22; as Star Sapphire: Green Lantern vol. 2 #16
Paste-Pot Pete	1963 (January)	Marvel	Stan Lee, Jack Kirby	Strange Tales #104
Impossible Man	1963 (February)	Marvel	Stan Lee, Jack Kirby	Fantastic Four vol. 1 #11
Acrobat	1963 (March)	Marvel	Stan Lee, Jack Kirby	Strange Tales #106
The Chameleon	1963 (March)	Marvel	Stan Lee, Steve Ditko	The Amazing Spider-Man vol. 1 #1
Gargantus	1963 (April)	Marvel	Robert Bernstein, Jack Kirby	Tales of Suspense #40
Red Ghost	1963 (April)	Marvel	Stan Lee, Jack Kirby	Fantastic Four vol. 1 #13
Tinkerer	1963 (May)	Marvel	Stan Lee, Steve Ditko	The Amazing Spider-Man vol. 1 #2
Vulture	1963 (May)	Marvel	Stan Lee, Steve Ditko	The Amazing Spider-Man vol. 1 #2
Awesome Android	1963 (June)	Marvel	Stan Lee, Jack Kirby	Fantastic Four vol. 1 #15
Mad Thinker	1963 (June)	Marvel	Stan Lee, Jack Kirby	Fantastic Four vol. 1 #15
Radioactive Man	1963 (June)	Marvel	Stan Lee, Jack Kirby	Journey into Mystery #93
Doctor Octopus	1963 (July)	Marvel	Stan Lee, Steve Ditko	The Amazing Spider-Man vol. 1 #3
Eclipso	1963 (July)	DC	Bob Haney, Lee Elias	House of Secrets #61
Nightmare	1963 (July)	Marvel	Stan Lee, Steve Ditko	Strange Tales #110
Asbestos Man	1963 (August)	Marvel	Stan Lee, Jack Kirby	Strange Tales #111
Baron Mordo	1963 (August)	Marvel	Stan Lee, Steve Ditko	Strange Tales #111
Jack Frost	1963 (September)	Marvel	Stan Lee, Don Heck	Tales of Suspense #45
Magneto	1963 (September)	Marvel	Stan Lee, Jack Kirby	Uncanny X-Men #1
Sandman	1963 (September)	Marvel	Stan Lee, Steve Ditko	The Amazing Spider-Man vol. 1 #4
Super-Skrull	1963 (September)	Marvel	Stan Lee, Jack Kirby	Fantastic Four vol. 1 #18
Crimson Dynamo (Anton Vanko)	1963 (October)	Marvel	Stan Lee, Don Heck	Tales of Suspense #46
Rama-Tut	1963 (October)	Marvel	Stan Lee, Jack Kirby	Fantastic Four vol. 1 #19
Porcupine	1963 (October)	Marvel	Stan Lee, Don Heck	Tales to Astonish #48
Plantman	1963 (October)	Marvel	Joe Carter, Stan Lee, Dick Ayers	Strange Tales #113
Heat Wave	1963 (November)	DC	John Broome, Carmine Infantino	The Flash (vol. 1) #140
Lizard	1963 (November)	Marvel	Stan Lee, Steve Ditko	The Amazing Spider-Man vol. 1 #6
Molecule Man	1963 (November)	Marvel	Stan Lee, Jack Kirby	Fantastic Four vol. 1 #20
Space Phantom	1963 (November)	Marvel	Stan Lee, Jack Kirby	Avengers vol. 1 #2
Vanisher	1963 (November)	Marvel	Stan Lee, Jack Kirby	Uncanny X-Men #2
Hate-Monger	1963 (December)	Marvel	Stan Lee, Jack Kirby	Fantastic Four vol. 1 #21
Mister Hyde	1963 (December)	Marvel	Stan Lee, Don Heck	Journey into Mystery #99
Catman	1963	DC	Bill Finger, Jim Mooney	Detective Comics #311
Reverse Flash	1963	DC	John Broome, Carmine Infantino	The Flash vol. 1 #139
Queen Bee	1963	DC		Justice League of America vol. 1 #23
Shark	1963	DC		Green Lantern vol. 2 #24
Superman Revenge Squad	1963	DC		Superman vol. 1 #163
Tattooed Man	1963	DC		Green Lantern vol. 2 #23
Blob	1964 (January)	Marvel	Stan Lee, Jack Kirby	Uncanny X-Men #3
Moloids	1964 (January)	Marvel	Stan Lee, Jack Kirby	Fantastic Four vol. 1 #22
Black Knight	1964 (February)	Marvel		Tales To Astonish #52
Mandarin	1964 (February)	Marvel	Stan Lee, Don Heck	Tales of Suspense #50
Electro	1964 (February)	Marvel	Stan Lee, Steve Ditko	The Amazing Spider-Man vol. 1 #9
The Terrible Trio	1964 (February)	Marvel	Stan Lee, Jack Kirby	Fantastic Four vol. 1 #23
Infant Terrible	1964 (March)	Marvel	Stan Lee, Jack Kirby	Fantastic Four vol. 1 #24
Hela	1964 (March)	Marvel	Stan Lee, Jack Kirby	Journey into Mystery #102
Enforcers	1964 (March)	Marvel	Stan Lee, Steve Ditko	The Amazing Spider-Man vol 1 #10
Mastermind	1964 (March)	Marvel	Stan Lee, Jack Kirby	Uncanny X-Men #4
Quicksilver	1964 (March)	Marvel	Stan Lee, Jack Kirby	Uncanny X-Men #4
Scarlet Witch	1964 (March)	Marvel	Stan Lee, Jack Kirby	Uncanny X-Men #4
Toad	1964 (March)	Marvel	Stan Lee, Jack Kirby	Uncanny X-Men #4
Brotherhood of Mutants	1964 (March)	Marvel	Stan Lee, Jack Kirby	Uncanny X-Men #4
Baron Zemo	1964 (March)	Marvel	Stan Lee, Jack Kirby	Avengers vol. 1 #4
Enchantress	1964 (April)	Marvel	Stan Lee, Jack Kirby	Journey into Mystery #103
Executioner	1964 (April)	Marvel	Stan Lee, Jack Kirby	Journey into Mystery #103
Black Widow	1964 (April)	Marvel	Stan Lee, Don Rico, Don Heck	Tales of Suspense #52
Crimson Dynamo (Boris Turgenev)	1964 (April)	Marvel	Stan Lee, Don Rico, Don Heck	Tales of Suspense #52
Lava Men	1964 (May)	Marvel	Stan Lee, Jack Kirby	Avengers vol. 1 #5
Mysterio	1964 (June)	Marvel	Stan Lee, Steve Ditko	The Amazing Spider-Man vol. 1 #13
Green Goblin	1964 (July)	Marvel	Stan Lee, Steve Ditko	The Amazing Spider-Man vol. 1 #14
Masters of Evil	1964 (July)	Marvel	Stan Lee, Jack Kirby	Avengers vol. 1 #6
Beetle	1964 (August)	Marvel	Stan Lee, Carl Burgos	Strange Tales #123
Kraven the Hunter	1964 (August)	Marvel	Stan Lee, Steve Ditko	The Amazing Spider-Man vol. 1 #15
Diablo	1964 (September)	Marvel	Stan Lee, Jack Kirby	Fantastic Four vol. 1 #30
Kang the Conqueror	1964 (September)	Marvel	Stan Lee, Jack Kirby	Avengers vol. 1 #8
Sinister Six	1964 (October)	Marvel	Stan Lee, Steve Ditko	The Amazing Spider-Man Annual #1
Dormammu	1964 (November)	Marvel	Stan Lee, Jack Kirby	Strange Tales #126
Immortus	1964 (November)	Marvel	Stan Lee, Jack Kirby, Don Heck	Avengers vol. 1 #10
Unus the Untouchable	1964 (November)	Marvel	Stan Lee, Jack Kirby	Uncanny X-Men #8
Attuma	1964 (December)	Marvel	Stan Lee, Jack Kirby	Fantastic Four vol. 1 #33
Leader	1964 (December)	Marvel	Stan Lee, Steve Ditko	Tales To Astonish #62
Black Hand	1964	DC	John Broome, Gil Kane	Green Lantern vol. 2 #29
Brotherhood of Evil	1964	DC	Arnold Drake, Bruno Premiani	Doom Patrol vol. 1 #86
Composite Superman	1964	DC	Edmond Hamilton, Curt Swan	World's Finest Comics #142
Crime Syndicate of America	1964	DC	Gardner Fox, Mike Sekowsky	Justice League of America vol. 1 #29
Mister Twister	1964	DC	Bob Haney, Bruno Premiani	The Brave and the Bold vol. 1 #54
Owlman	1964	DC	Gardner Fox, Mike Sekowsky	Justice League of America vol. 1 #29
T.O. Morrow	1964	DC	John Broome	The Flash vol. 1 #143
Ultraman	1964	DC	Gardner Fox, Mike Sekowsky	Justice League of America vol. 1 #29
Lucifer	1965 (January)	Marvel	Stan Lee, Jack Kirby	Uncanny X-Men #9
Scorpion	1965 (January)	Marvel	Stan Lee, Steve Ditko	The Amazing Spider-Man vol. 1 #20
Count Nefaria	1965 (February)	Marvel	Stan Lee, Jack Kirby, Don Heck	Avengers vol. 1 #13
Dragon Man	1965 (February)	Marvel	Stan Lee, Jack Kirby	Fantastic Four vol. 1 #35
Absorbing Man	1965 (March)	Marvel	Stan Lee, Jack Kirby	Journey into Mystery #114
Frightful Four	1965(March)	Marvel	Stan Lee, Jack Kirby	Fantastic Four vol. 1 #36
Medusa	1965(March)	Marvel	Stan Lee, Jack Kirby	Fantastic Four vol. 1 #36
The Stranger	1965 (May)	Marvel	Stan Lee, Jack Kirby	Uncanny X-Men #11
Spencer Smythe	1965 (June)	Marvel	Stan Lee, Steve Ditko	The Amazing Spider-Man vol. 1 #25
Juggernaut	1965 (July)	Marvel	Stan Lee, Jack Kirby	Uncanny X-Men #12
Agent H of Hydra	1965 (August)	Marvel	Stan Lee, Jack Kirby	Strange Tales #135
Swordsman	1965 (August)	Marvel	Stan Lee, Jack Kirby, Don Heck	Avengers vol. 1 #19
Hydra	1965 (August)	Marvel	Stan Lee, Jack Kirby	Strange Tales #135
Titanium Man	1965 (August)	Marvel	Stan Lee, Don Heck	Tales of Suspense #69
Molten Man	1965 (September)	Marvel	Stan Lee, Steve Ditko	The Amazing Spider-Man vol. 1 #28
Power Man	1965(October)	Marvel	Stan Lee, Jack Kirby, Don Heck	Avengers vol. 1 #21
Bolivar Trask	1965 (November)	Marvel	Stan Lee, Jack Kirby	Uncanny X-Men #14
Sentinels	1965 (November)	Marvel	Stan Lee, Jack Kirby	Uncanny X-Men #14
Shrike	1965 (December)	DC		Hawkman vol. 1 #11
Maximus	1965 (December)	Marvel	Stan Lee, Jack Kirby	Fantastic Four vol. 1 #45
Master Mold	1965 (December)	Marvel	Stan Lee, Jack Kirby	Uncanny X-Men #15
Blockbuster	1965	DC	Gardner Fox, Carmine Infantino	Detective Comics #345
Fisherman	1965	DC	Henry Boltinoff, Nick Cardy	Aquaman vol. 2, #21
Goldface	1965	DC	Gil Kane	Green Lantern vol. 2 #38
Krona	1965	DC	John Broome, Gil Kane	Green Lantern vol. 2 #40
Psycho-Pirate	1965	DC	Gardner Fox, Murphy Anderson	Showcase #56
The Separated Man	1965	DC	Bob Haney, Bruno Premiani	The Brave and the Bold vol. 1 #60
Poison Ivy	1966 (June)	DC	Robert Kanigher, Sheldon Moldoff	Batman (vol. 1) #181
Advanced Idea Mechanics	1966	Marvel		Strange Tales #146
Parasite	1966 (August)	DC	Jim Shooter	Action Comics (vol. 1) #340
Peacemaker (Christopher Smith)	1966 (November)	DC	Joe Gill, Pat Boyette	Fightin' 5 #40
Batroc the Leaper	1966	Marvel	Stan Lee, Jack Kirby	Tales of Suspense #75
Bug-Eyed Bandit	1966	DC		Atom #26
Cluemaster	1966	DC	Gardner Fox, Carmine Infantino	Detective Comics #351
Fixer	1966	Marvel	Stan Lee, Jack Kirby	Strange Tales #141
Galactus	1966	Marvel	Stan Lee, Jack Kirby	Fantastic Four vol. 1 #48
Hades	1966 (May)	Marvel	Stan Lee, Jack Kirby	Thor #127
Collector	1966	Marvel	Stan Lee, Don Heck	The Avengers #28
High Evolutionary	1966	Marvel	Stan Lee, Jack Kirby	Thor #134
Klaw	1966	Marvel	Stan Lee, Jack Kirby	Fantastic Four vol. 1 #53
Living Laser	1966	Marvel	Stan Lee, Art Simek, Don Heck	Avengers vol. 1 #34
Major Disaster	1966	DC	Gardner Fox, Gil Kane	Green Lantern vol. 2 #43
Man-Beast	1966	Marvel	Stan Lee, Jack Kirby	Thor #135
Mimic	1966	Marvel	Stan Lee, Jack Kirby	Uncanny X-Men #19
Nemesis Kid	1966	DC	Jim Shooter	Adventure Comics (vol. 1) #346
Ocean Master	1966	DC	Bob Haney, Nick Cardy	Aquaman (vol. 2) #29
Rhino	1966	Marvel	Stan Lee, John Romita, Sr.	The Amazing Spider-Man vol. 1 #41
Royal Flush Gang	1966	DC	Gardner Fox, Mike Sekowsky	Justice League of America vol. 1 #43
Spellbinder (Delbert Billings)	1966	DC		Detective Comics #358
Umar	1966	Marvel	Roy Thomas, Bill Everett	Strange Tales #150
Black Manta	1967 (September)	DC	Bob Haney, Nick Cardy	Aquaman (vol. 1) #35
Awesome Threesome	1967	DC	Henry Boltinoff, Nick Cardy	Aquaman vol. 2 #36
Abomination	1967 (April)	Marvel	Stan Lee, Gil Kane	Tales to Astonish #90
Blastaar	1967	Marvel	Stan Lee, Jack Kirby	Fantastic Four vol. 1 #62
Cobalt Man	1967	Marvel	Roy Thomas, Werner Roth	Uncanny X-Men #31
Factor Three	1967	Marvel		Uncanny X-Men #37
Shocker	1967 (March)	Marvel	Stan Lee, John Romita Sr.	The Amazing Spider-Man vol 1 #46
Growing Man	1967	Marvel	Stan Lee, Jack Kirby	Thor #140
Intergalactic Sentry #459	1967	Marvel	Stan Lee, Jack Kirby	Fantastic Four vol. 1 #64
Kingpin	1967	Marvel	Stan Lee, John Romita, Sr.	The Amazing Spider-Man vol. 1 #50
The Kree	1967	Marvel	Stan Lee, Jack Kirby	Fantastic Four vol. 1 #65
Lion-Mane	1967	DC	Gardner Fox, Murphy Anderson	Hawkman vol. 1 #20
Mad Mod	1967	DC	Bob Haney, Nick Cardy	Teen Titans vol. 1 #7
MODOK	1967	Marvel	Jack Kirby	Tales of Suspense #94
Persuader	1967	DC	Jim Shooter, Curt Swan	Adventure Comics #352
Psycho-Man	1967	Marvel	Stan Lee, Jack Kirby	Fantastic Four Annual #5
Ronan the Accuser	1967	Marvel	Stan Lee, Jack Kirby	Fantastic Four vol. 1 #65
Supreme Intelligence	1967	Marvel	Stan Lee, Jack Kirby	Fantastic Four vol. 1 #65
Vulture (Blackie Drago)	1967	Marvel		The Amazing Spider-Man vol. 1 #67
Mangog	1968 (July)	Marvel	Stan Lee, Jack Kirby	Thor #154
Tiger Shark	1968 (September)	Marvel	Roy Thomas, John Buscema	Prince Namor, the Sub-Mariner #5
Mesmero	1968 (October)	Marvel	Arnold Drake	X-Men #49
Doctor Faustus	1968 (November)	Marvel	Stan Lee, Jack Kirby	Captain America (v1) #107
Scavenger	1968	DC	Henry Boltinoff, Nick Cardy	Aquaman vol. 2 #37
The Aliens of "Dimension X"	1968	DC	Bob Haney, Nick Cardy	Teen Titans vol. 1 #16
Annihilus	1968	Marvel	Stan Lee, Jack Kirby	Fantastic Four Annual #6
Black Zero	1968	DC		Superman vol. 1 #205
Copperhead	1968	DC	Bob Haney, Bob Brown	The Brave and the Bold vol. 1 #78
The Gargoyle	1968	DC	Bob Haney, Nick Cardy	Teen Titans vol. 1 #14
Grim Reaper	1968	Marvel	Roy Thomas, John Buscema	Avengers vol. 1 #52
Ultron	1968	Marvel	Roy Thomas, John Buscema	Avengers #54
Hellgrammite	1968	DC	Bob Haney, Neal Adams	The Brave and the Bold vol. 1 #80
League of Assassins	1968	DC	Denny O'Neil, Neal Adams	Strange Adventures #215
Mephisto	1968	Marvel	Stan Lee, John Buscema	Silver Surfer #3
Sensei	1968	DC	Neal Adams	Strange Adventures #215
Madame Masque	1968	Marvel	Stan Lee, Gene Colan	Tales of Suspense #97
Doctor Cyber	1968 (December)	DC	Dennis O'Neil, Mike Sekowsky	Wonder Woman #179
Man-Ape	1969 (March)	Marvel	Roy Thomas, John Buscema	Avengers #62
Grandmaster	1969 (October)	Marvel	Roy Thomas, Sal Buscema	Avengers #69
Squadron Sinister	1969 (October)	Marvel	Roy Thomas, Sal Buscema	Avengers #69
Doctor Spectrum	1969 (November)	Marvel	Roy Thomas	Avengers vol. 1 #70
Hyperion	1969 (November)	Marvel	Roy Thomas, Sal Buscema	Avengers vol. 1 #70
The Fat Man	1969	DC	Neal Adams	Teen Titans vol. 1 #20
Naga	1969	Marvel	Roy Thomas, Marie Severin	Sub-Mariner #9
Set	1969	Marvel	Roy Thomas	Sub-Mariner #9
Viper	1969	Marvel	Jim Steranko	Captain America vol. 1 #110

== 1970s ==
Character / Team	Year Debuted	Company	Creator/s	First Appearance
Agatha Harkness	1970 (January)	Marvel	Stan Lee, Jack Kirby	Fantastic Four #94
Arkon	1970 (April)	Marvel	Roy Thomas, John Buscema	Avengers #75
Man-Bat	1970 (June)	DC	Frank Robbins, Neal Adams	Detective Comics (vol. 1) #400
Lethal Legion	1970 (July)	Marvel	Roy Thomas, John Buscema, Tom Palmer	Avengers #78
Intergang (Morgan Edge)	1970 (October)	DC	Jack Kirby	Superman's Pal Jimmy Olsen #133
Darkseid	1970 (November)	DC	Jack Kirby	Superman's Pal Jimmy Olsen #134
Orka	1970	Marvel	Roy Thomas, Marie Severin	Sub-Mariner #23
Aries	1970; 1974; 1977; 1984; 1987; 1998	Marvel	Roy Thomas, Sal Buscema; Steve Englehart, Bob Brown; David Anthony Kraft, Keith Giffen; Dennis O'Neil, Luke McDonnell; Steve Englehart, Al Milgrom; Steve Seagle, Duncan Rouleau	The Avengers #72; The Avengers #120; The Defenders #49; Iron Man #184; West Coast Avengers Vol.2 #26; Alpha Flight Vol.2 #12
Appa Ali Apsa	1970	DC	Dennis O'Neil, Neal Adams	Green Lantern Series 2, #76
Llyra	1970	Marvel	Roy Thomas, Sal Buscema	Sub-Mariner #32
Ten-Eyed Man	1970	DC	Frank Robbins, Irv Novick, Dick Giordano	Batman #226
Kanto	1971	DC	Jack Kirby	Mister Miracle #1
Kalibak	1971	DC	Jack Kirby	New Gods #1
Parademons	1971	DC	Jack Kirby	New Gods #1
Bruno Mannheim	1971	DC	Jack Kirby	Superman's Pal Jimmy Olsen #139
Deep Six	1971	DC	Jack Kirby	New Gods #2
Doctor Bedlam	1971	DC	Jack Kirby	Mister Miracle #2
Granny Goodness	1971	DC	Jack Kirby	Mister Miracle #2
DeSaad	1971 (May)	DC	Jack Kirby	Forever People (vol. 1) #2
Mantis	1971 (May)	DC	Jack Kirby	Forever People (vol. 1) #2
Glorious Godfrey	1971	DC	Jack Kirby	Forever People #3
Talia al Ghul	1971 (May)	DC	Denny O'Neil	Detective Comics (vol. 1) #411
Ra's al Ghul	1971 (June)	DC	Dennis O'Neil, Neal Adams	Batman (vol. 1) #232
Overmind	1971 (August)	Marvel	Stan Lee, John Buscema	Fantastic Four #113
Merlyn	1971 (November)	DC	Mike Friedrich, Neal Adams, Dick Dillin	Justice League of America #94
Virman Vundabar	1971	DC	Jack Kirby	Mister Miracle #5
Ballox the Monstroid	1972	Marvel	Gerry Conway, Gil Kane	Marvel Team-Up #5
Heggra	1972	DC	Jack Kirby	New Gods #7
Female Furies (Bernadeth, Lashina, Mad Harriet, Stompa)	1972	DC	Jack Kirby	Mister Miracle #6
Kulan Gath	1972	Marvel	Roy Thomas, Barry Windsor-Smith, Michael Moorcock, James Cawthorn	Conan the Barbarian #14-15
Effron the Sorcerer	1972	DC	Elliot S! Maggin	World's Finest Comics #210
Gilotina	1972	DC	Jack Kirby	Mister Miracle #8
Terra-Man	1972	DC		Superman #249
Devilance	1972	DC	Jack Kirby	Forever People #11
Grand Director	1972	Marvel	Captain America: Steve Englehart, Sal Buscema; Grand Director: Roger McKenzie, Jim Shooter, Sal Buscema	Captain America #153
Griffin (Marvel Comics)	1972	DC	Steve Englehart, Tom Sutton	Amazing Adventures #15
Doctor Moon	1972	DC		Batman #240
Basilisk	1973	Marvel	Len Wein, Gil Kane	Marvel Team-Up #16
Mandrill	1973	Marvel	Carole Seuling, Ross Andru	Shanna the She-Devil #4
The Man-Killer	1973	Marvel	Gerry Conway, Jim Mooney	Marvel Team-Up #8
Moondark	1973	Marvel	Gerry Conway, Len Wein, Ross Andru	Marvel Team-Up #12
Nekra	1973	Marvel	Steve Gerber, Ross Andru	Shanna the She-Devil #5
Orb	1973	Marvel	Len Wein, Ross Andru	Marvel Team-Up #15
Thanos	1973	Marvel	Jim Starlin	Iron Man #55
Erik Killmonger	1973	Marvel	Don McGregor,Rich Buckler	Jungle Action #6 (September 1973)
They Who Wield Power	1973	Marvel	Len Wein, Ross Andru	Marvel Team-Up #15
Angar the Screamer	1973	Marvel	Steve Gerber, Gene Colan, John Tartaglione	Daredevil #100
Stegron	1974	Marvel	Len Wein, Gil Kane	Marvel Team-Up #19
Punisher	1974	Marvel	Gerry Conway, Ross Andru, John Romita, Sr.	The Amazing Spider-Man #129
Midnight Sun	1974	Marvel	Steve Englehart, Jim Starlin, Al Milgrom	Special Marvel Edition #16
Black Talon	1974	Marvel	Gene Colan, Len Wein	Strange Tales #173
Anthony Lupus	1974	DC		Batman #255
Allatou	1974	Marvel	Steve Gerber, Gene Colan	Marvel Spotlight #18
Tarantula	1974	Marvel	Ross Andru, Gerry Conway	The Amazing Spider-Man #134
Wrecking Crew	1974 (November)	Marvel	Len Wein, Sal Buscema	The Defenders vol. 1, #17
Legion of the Unliving	1975	Marvel		Avengers #131
Korvac	1975	Marvel	Steve Gerber, Jim Starlin	Giant-Size Defenders #3
Moses Magnum	1975	Marvel	Gerry Conway, Stan Lee, Ross Andru, Steve Ditko	Giant-Size Spider-Man 4
Magus (Adam Warlock)	1975	Marvel	Jim Starlin	Strange Tales (Vol.2) #178
Manhunters	1975	DC	Jack Kirby	1st Issue Special #5 (Aug. 1975)
Chthon	1975	Marvel	Marv Wolfman, Bill Mantlo, Yong Mountaino	Marvel Chillers #1
Moonstone	1975	Marvel	Marv Wolfman, Frank Robbins	Captain America #192
Bullseye	1976 (March)	Marvel	Marv Wolfman, John Romita Sr.	Daredevil #131
Blackrock	1976	DC		Action Comics #458
100	1976	DC	100: Robert Kanigher (writer), Ross Andru (artist); 1000: Dan Jurgens	100: Lois Lane #105; 1000: Booster Gold #2
O.G.R.E.	1976	DC	Bob Haney, Nick Cardy	Aquaman #301
Baron Blood	1976	Marvel	Roy Thomas, Frank Robbins, Vince Colletta	Invaders #7
SKULL	1976	DC	Gerry Conway, Curt Swan	Superman #301
Atomic Skull	1976	DC	Gerry Conway, Curt Swan	Superman #303
Black Spider	#1: 1976; #2: 1995	DC	#1: Gerry Conway	#1: Detective Comics #463; #2: Batman #518
Duela Dent	1976	DC	Bob Rozakis	Batman Family #6
Doctor Phosphorus	1977	DC	Steve Englehart	Detective Comics #469
Rupert Thorne	1977	DC	Steve Englehart, Walter Simonson	Detective Comics #469
Graviton	1977	Marvel	Jim Shooter, Sal Buscema	Avengers #158
Hulk Robot	1977	Marvel		Eternals #14
Deathbird	1977	Marvel	Chris Claremont, Keith Pollard	Ms. Marvel #9
Aqueduct	1977	Marvel	Jim Shooter, Don Heck	Ghost Rider #23
Faora	1977	DC		Action Comics #471
Golden Glider	1977	DC	Cary Bates, Irv Novick	Flash #250
Constrictor	1977	Marvel	Writers: Len Wein, Sal Buscema; Artists: Ernie Chan, Glynis Wein	Incredible Hulk #212
Baron Blitzkrieg	1977	DC		World's Finest Comics #246
Sabretooth	1977	Marvel	Chris Claremont, John Byrne	Iron Fist #14
Resistants	1977	Marvel	Jack Kirby	Captain America Annual #4
Doctor Demonicus	1977	Marvel	Doug Moench, Tom Sutton	Godzilla #4
Killer Frost	1978 (June)	DC	Gerry Conway, Al Migrom	Steel, The Indestructible Man #1
Mystique	1978	Marvel	Chris Claremont, Dave Cockrum	Ms. Marvel #16
Blackout	1978	Marvel	Marv Wolfman, Carmine Infantino, Tom Palmer	Nova #19
Count Vertigo	1978	DC	Bob Haney, Vince Colletta, George Tuska	World's Finest Comics #251
Fadeaway Man	1978	DC	Len Wein, Rich Buckler	Detective Comics #479
Blue Streak	1978	Marvel	Roy Thomas, John Buscema	Captain America v1 #217
Needle	1978	Marvel	Mark Gruenwald, Carmine Infantino, Al Gordon	Spider-Woman #9
Maxie Zeus	1979	DC		Detective Comics #483
Crossfire	1979	Marvel	Steven Grant, Jim Craig	Marvel Two-in-One #52
Letha	1979	Marvel	Mark Gruenwald, Ralph Macchio, John Byrne	Marvel Two-in-One #54
Poundcakes	1979	Marvel	Mark Gruenwald, Ralph Macchio, John Byrne	Marvel Two-in-One #54
Screaming Mimi	1979 (August)	Marvel	Mark Gruenwald, Ralph Macchio, John Byrne	Marvel Two-in-One #54
Zaran	1979	Marvel	Mike Zeck	Master of Kung Fu #77
Firebug	1979	DC		Batman #318

== 1980s ==
Character / Team	Year Debuted	Company	Creator/s	First Appearance
Cutthroat	1980	Marvel		Marvel Team-Up Vol.1 #89
Destiny	1980	Marvel	Chris Claremont, John Byrne	Uncanny X-Men #141
Sebastian Shaw	1980	Marvel	Chris Claremont, John Byrne	Uncanny X-Men #131
Rainbow Raider	1980	DC	Cary Bates	Flash #286
Dansen Macabre	1980	Marvel	Steven Grant, Tom Sutton, Carmine Infantino	Marvel Team-Up vol.1 #93
Anaconda	1980	Marvel	Mark Gruenwald, Ralph Macchio	Marvel Two-in-One #64
H.I.V.E.	1980	DC	Marv Wolfman, George Pérez	New Teen Titans #2
Mongul	Mongul #1: 1980; Mongul #2: 1995	DC	Mongul #1: Len Wein, Jim Starlin; Mongul #2: Jeph Loeb	Mongul #1: DC Comics Presents #27; Mongul #2: Showcase '95 #8
Deathstroke	1980 (December)	DC	Marv Wolfman, George Pérez	New Teen Titans (vol. 1) #2
Trigon	1980 (December)	DC	Marv Wolfman, George Pérez	New Teen Titans (vol. 1) #2
Electrocutioner	1981	DC	Marv Wolfman, Michael Fleisher, Irv Novick	Batman #331
Fearsome Five	1981	DC	Marv Wolfman, George Pérez	New Teen Titans #3
Gizmo	1981	DC	Marv Wolfman, George Pérez	New Teen Titans #3
Mammoth	1981	DC	Marv Wolfman, George Pérez	New Teen Titans #3
Maelstrom	1981	Marvel	Mark Gruenwald	Marvel Two-in-One #71
Jack O'Lantern	1981	Marvel	Tom DeFalco, Steve Ditko	Machine Man #19
Nekron	1981 (June)	DC	Mike W. Barr, Joe Staton	Tales of the Green Lantern Corps #2
Neutron	1981	DC	Marv Wolfman, Joe Staton	Action Comics #525
Ghost Maker	1982 (March)	Marvel	Doug Moench, Gene Day	Master of Kung Fu #110
Magenta	1982	DC	Marv Wolfman, George Pérez	The New Teen Titans #17|-
Gargantua	1982	Marvel		Defenders #126
Vermin	1982	Marvel	J. M. DeMatteis, Mike Zeck	Captain America #272
Grendel	1982	Comico	Matt Wagner	Comico Primer #2
Hobgoblin	1983	Marvel	Roger Stern, John Romita Jr.	Spectacular Spider-Man #43 (as Roderick Kingsley); Amazing Spider-Man #238 (as Hobgoblin)
Killer Croc	1983 (March)	DC	Gerry Conway, Don Newton	Batman (vol. 1) #357
Jason Todd	1983 (March)	DC	Robin: Gerry Conway, Don Newton; Red Hood: Judd Winick, Doug Mahnke	Batman (vol. 1) #357
Lobo	1983 (June)	DC	Roger Slifer, Keith Giffen	Omega Men (vol. 1) #3
Lady Deathstrike	1983	Marvel	Dennis O'Neil, Larry Hama, Klaus Janson, William Johnson	Daredevil #197
Deathbolt	1983	DC	Roy Thomas	All-Star Squadron #21
Brainwave	1983	DC	Roy Thomas, Jerry Ordway, Mike Machlan	All-Star Squadron #24
Northwind	1983	DC	Roy Thomas, Jerry Ordway, Mike Machlan	All-Star Squadron #25
Master of the World	1983	Marvel	John Byrne	Alpha Flight Vol. 1, #2
Nocturna	1983	DC	Doug Moench	Detective Comics #529
Iron Maiden	1983	Marvel	Ralph Macchio, George Pérez	Marvel Fanfare vol.1 #11
Javelin	1984 (February)	DC	Dennis O'Neil, Mike Sekowsky, Dick Giordano	Green Lantern (vol. 2) #173
Tsunami	1984 (May)	DC		All-Star Squadron #33
Shredder	1984 (May)	Mirage	Kevin Eastman, Peter Laird	Teenage Mutant Ninja Turtles (vol. 1) #1
Jericho	1984 (June)	DC	Marv Wolfman, George Pérez	Tales of the Teen Titans #43
Titania	1984 (July)	Marvel	Jim Shooter, Mike Zeck	Secret Wars #3
Magus (X-Men)	1984	Marvel	Chris Claremont, Bill Sienkiewicz	New Mutants #18
Answer	1984	Marvel		Spectacular Spider-Man Vol.2 #92
Freedom Force	1985	Marvel	Chris Claremont, John Romita Jr	Uncany X-Men #199
Anti-Monitor	1985	DC	Marv Wolfman, George Pérez, Jerry Ordway	Crisis on Infinite Earths #2
Armadillo	1985	Marvel	Mark Gruenwald, Paul Neary, Dennis Janke	Captain America #308
Black Mask	1985	DC	Doug Moench, Tom Mandrake	Batman #386
Jinx	1985	DC	Marv Wolfman, Chuck Patton	Tales of the Teen Titans #56
Spiral	1985	Marvel	Ann Nocienti, Art Adams	Longshot #1
Ghaur	1985	Marvel	Peter B. Gillis, Sal Buscema	Eternals v2, #2
Flag-Smasher	1985	Marvel	Mark Gruenwald, Paul Neary	Captain America #312
Nebula	1985 (July)	Marvel	Roger Stern, John Buscema	The Avengers #257
Weasel	1985 (August)	DC	Gerry Conway, Rafael Kayanan	The Fury of Firestorm #35
Superboy-Prime	1985 (November)	DC	Elliot S! Maggin, Curt Swan	DC Comics Presents #87
Film Freak	1986	DC		Batman #395
Master Pandemonium	1986	Marvel		West Coast Avengers #4
Battleaxe	1986	Marvel	Michael Carlin, Ron Wilson	The Thing #33
Apocalypse	1986	Marvel	Louise Simonson, Jackson Guice	X-Factor #5
Headlok	1986	Marvel	Steve Englehart, Al Milgrom	West Coast Avengers #10
Halflife	1986	Marvel	Steve Englehart, Al Milgrom	West Coast Avengers #12
Quantum	1986	Marvel	Steve Englehart, Al Milgrom	West Coast Avengers #12
Magpie	1986	DC		Batman #401
Carmine Falcone	1987 (February)	DC	Frank Miller, David Mazzucchelli	Batman #405
Icicle (Cameron Mahkent)	1987 (January)	DC	Roy Thomas, Dann Thomas, Todd McFarlane	Infinity, Inc. #34
Famine	1987	Marvel	Louise Simonson, Walter Simonson	X-Factor #12
Artemis Crock	1987	DC	Roy Thomas, Todd McFarlane	Infinity, Inc. #34
Axis Amerika	1987	DC	Roy Thomas	Young All-Stars #1
Amazing Grace	1987	DC	John Byrne	Superman (Vol. 2) #3
Bloodsport	1987	DC		Superman #4
Gillian B. Loeb	1987	DC		Batman: Year One
Maxwell Lord	1987 (May)	DC	Keith Giffen, J. M. DeMatteis	Justice League (vol. 1) #1
Mister Sinister	1987	Marvel	Chris Claremont, Mark Silvestri	Uncanny X-Men #221
Prometheus	Curt Calhoun: 1987; Morrison's Prometheus: 1997	DC	Curt Calhoun: Marv Wolfman; Morrison's Prometheus: Grant Morrison, Arnie Jorgensen	Curt Calhoun: Blue Beetle #12; Morrison's Prometheus: New Year's Evil: Prometheus #1
Reaper	1987	DC		Batman: Year Two
Silver Banshee	1987	DC	John Byrne	Action Comics #595
Ventriloquist	1988	DC	Alan Grant, John Wagner, Norm Breyfogle	Detective Comics #583
Major Force	1988	DC	Cary Bates, Greg Weisman, Pat Broderick	Captain Atom v3, #12
KGBeast	1988	DC	Jim Starlin, Jim Aparo	Batman #417
Ratcatcher	1988	DC	Alan Grant, John Wagner, Norm Breyfogle	Detective Comics #585
Cold War	1988	Marvel		Marvel Comics Presents #2
Deacon Blackfire	1988	DC		The Cult
Venom	1988	Marvel	David Michelinie, Todd McFarlane	The Amazing Spider-Man #299
Misfit	1989	Marvel	Mark Gruenwald, Al Milgrom	West Coast Avengers #40
Blockbuster	1989	DC	Roger Stern, Tom Lyle	Starman #9
Portal	1989	Marvel		Avengers #304
Maxima	1989	DC	Roger Stern, George Pérez	Action Comics #645
Powderkeg	1989	Marvel	Dwayne McDuffie, Mark D. Bright	Captain Marvel Special #1
Deadline	1989	DC		Starman #15
Crossbones	1989	Marvel	Mark Gruenwald, Kieron Dwyer	Captain America #360
Mud Pack	1989	DC		Detective Comics #604
Artemiz	1989	DC	John Ostrander	Suicide Squad #35
Anarky	1989	DC	Alan Grant, Norm Breyfogle	Detective Comics #608
Assembly of Evil	1989	Marvel		Acts of Vengeance

== 1990s ==
Character / Team	Year Debuted	Company	Creator/s	First Appearance
Crimesmith	1990	DC	Marv Wolfman	Batman #443
NKVDemon	1990	DC	Marv Wolfman, Jim Aparo	Batman #445
Blackout (Lilin)	1990 (June)	Marvel	Howard Mackie	Ghost Rider #2
Cyborg Superman (Hank Henshaw)	1990	DC	Dan Jurgens	Adventures of Superman #466
Yuga Khan	1990	DC		New Gods Vol.2, #17
Blaze and Satanus	Blaze: 1990; Satanus: 1992	DC	Blaze: Roger Stern, Bob McLeod; Satanus: Jerry Ordway, Tom Grummett	Blaze: Action Comics #655; Satanus: Adventures of Superman #493
Deadpool	1991	Marvel	Rob Liefeld, Fabian Nicieza	The New Mutants #98
Lynx	1991	DC	Chuck Dixon, Tom Lyle	Robin Vol.1
Bloody Mary	1991	DC		Hawk and Dove Vol.2 #21
Malice Vundabar	1991	DC		Hawk and Dove Vol.2 #21
Chessure	1991	DC		Hawk and Dove Vol.2 #21
Speed Queen	1991	DC	Karl Kesel, Barbara Kesel	Hawk and Dove Vol.2 #21
King Snake	1991	DC	Chuck Dixon, Tom Lyle	Robin #2
Abattoir	1991	DC		Detective Comics #625
Superia	1991	Marvel	Mark Gruenwald, Rik Levins	Captain America #390
Evil Ernie	1991	Eternity	Brain Pulido, Steven Hughes	Evil Ernie #1
Lady Death	1991	Eternity	Brian Pulido	Evil Ernie #1
Fabian Cortez	1991	Marvel	Chris Claremont, Jim Lee	X-Men Vol.2 #1
Acolytes	1991	Marvel	Chris Claremont, Jim Lee	X-Men Vol.2 #1
Carnage	1992	Marvel	David Michelinie, Mark Bagley	The Amazing Spider-Man #360
Amygdala	1992	DC	Alan Grant, Norm Breyfogle	Batman: Shadow of the Bat #3
Lloigoroth	1992	Marvel		Avengers #352
Doomsday	1992 (December)	DC	Dan Jurgens	Superman: The Man of Steel #17
Doppelganger	1992	Marvel	Jim Starlin, Ron Lim, Al Milgrom	Infinity War #1
Hawkman (Fel Andar)	1992 (April)	DC	John Ostrander, Graham Nolan	Hawkworld (vol. 2) #22
Rose Wilson	1992 (October)	DC	Marv Wolfman, Art Nichols	Deathstroke #15
Omega Red	1992	Marvel	Jim Lee, John Byrne	X-Men (Vol. 2) #4
Goddess	1992	Marvel	Jim Starlin, Ron Lim	Infinity War #6
General	1992	DC	Chuck Dixon	Detective Comics #654
Overlord	1992	Image	Erik Larsen	The Savage Dragon (vol. 1) #1
Big Head	1992	Dark Horse	Mike Richardson	Dark Horse Presents #10
Malebolgia	1992	Image	Todd McFarlane	Spawn#1
Jason Wynn	1992	Image	Todd Mcfarlane	Spawn#1
Violator	1992	Image	Todd McFarlane	Spawn #2
Billy Kincaid	1992	Image Comics	Todd Mcfarlane	Spawn #5
Overtkill	1992	Image Comics	Todd Mcfarlane	Spawn #6
Victor Zsasz	1992	DC	Alan Grant	Batman: Shadow of the Bat #1
Alkhema	1993	Marvel	Roy Thomas, Dann Thomas, David Ross, Tim Dzon	Avengers West Coast #90
Bane	1993 (January)	DC	Chuck Dixon, Graham Nolan, Doug Moench	Batman: Vengeance of Bane #1
Harlequin	1993	DC	Ron Marz, Jim Balent	Green Lantern Corps Quarterly #5
Kleinstocks	1993	Marvel	Scott Lobdell, Brandon Peterson	Uncanny X-Men #298
Mace Blitzkrieg	1993	Dark Horse	Team CGW	Comics' Greatest World: Steel Harbor Week 1
Titan	1993	Dark Horse	Team CGW	Comics' Greatest World: Golden City Week 3
Vindicator	1993	Image Comics	Todd Mcfarlane	Spawn #8
Cogliostro	1993	Image Comics	Todd McFarlane	Spawn #9
Redeemer	1993	Image Comics	Todd Mcfarlane	Spawn #16
Trigger Twins	1993	DC		Detective Comics #667
Warmaker	1993	Dark Horse	Team CGW	Comics' Greatest World: Golden City Week 1
Tally Man	1993	DC	Alan Grant	Shadow of the Bat #19
Americop	1994	Marvel		Captain America #428
Parallax	1994	DC	Hal Jordan: John Broome, Gil Kane; Concept: Ron Marz, Darryl Banks; Creature: Geoff Johns, Ethan van Sciver	Hal Jordan: Showcase #22; As Parallax: Green Lantern #50
Conduit	1994	DC		Superman #0
Ignition	1994	Dark Horse	Team CGW	Will To Power #4
Tremor	1994	Image Comics	Todd Mcfarlane	Spawn #25
Phlebiac Brothers	1994	Image Comics	Alan Moore	Violator #1
Knockout	1994	DC	Karl Kesel, Tom Grummett	SuperboyVol.2 #1
Scavenger	1994	DC	Karl Kesel, Tom Grummett	Superboy #2
King Shark	1994	DC	Karl Kesel	Superboy #0
Law	1994	Dark Horse		Division 13 #1
Massacre	1994	DC		Superman #92
Purgatori	1994	Eternity	Brian Pulido, Steven Hughes	Lady Death #3
Roxy Rocket	1994	DC		Batman Adventures Annual #1
Lady Spellbinder	1995	DC	Chuck Dixon, Staz Johnson, Scott Hanna	Detective Comics #691
Neron	1995	DC	Mark Waid, Howard Porter	Underworld Unleashed #1
Savitar	1995	DC		Flash v.2 #108
The Curse	1995	Image Comics	Todd Mcfarlane	Spawn #27
The Freak	1995	Image Comics	Todd Mcfarlane	Spawn #33
Cy-Gor	1995	Image Comics	Todd Mcfarlane	Spawn #38
Magog	1996 (May)	DC	Mark Waid, Alex Ross	Kingdom Come #1
Cornelius Stirk	1996	DC		Batman: Shadow of the Bat #46
Onslaught	1996	Marvel	Mark Waid, Andy Kubert	X-Men (Vol. 2) #54
Lock-Up	1996	DC		Batman: The Animated Series: Lock-Up; Detective Comics #697
Grayven	1996	DC	Ron Marz, Darryl Banks	Green Lantern Vol.3 #74
Anomaly	1996	DC		Adventures of Superman #539
Holiday	1996	DC	Jeph Loeb, Tim Sale	Batman: The Long Halloween
Tiffany	1996	Image	Todd Mcfarlane	Spawn #44
Alberto Falcone	1996	DC	Jeph Loeb, Tim Sale	Batman: The Long Halloween
Gearhead	1997	DC		Detective Comics #712
Fatality	1997	DC		Green Lantern #38
Cobalt Blue	1997	DC	Mark Waid, Brian Augustyn	Speed Force #1
Molloch, Lilith (as 'Lillie'), Nereus, Drive-By	1997		Brian Bondurant	Phat Wars #1 & #2
Dominus	1998	DC		Action Comics #747
Heap	1998	Image	Todd Mcfarlane	Spawn #72
Black Flash	1998	DC	Mark Millar, Pop Mhan, Christ Ivy	Flash #138
Solaris	1998	DC	Grant Morrison	DC One Million
David Cain	1999	DC	Kelley Puckett, Damion Scott	Batman #567
Mammon	1999	Image	Todd McFarlane	Spawn #87
Exemplars	1999	Marvel		Peter Parker: Spider-Man #11
Inertia	1999	DC	Todd Dezago, Mike Wieringo	Impulse #50
Answer	1999	Marvel		Captain America Vol.3 #20
Gog	1999	DC	Mark Waid	The Kingdom
Harley Quinn	1999 (October) (1992 animated)	DC	Paul Dini, Bruce Timm	Batman: Harley Quinn #1 (adapted from Batman: The Animated Series)
Hope Pym	1999 (April)	Marvel	Tom DeFalco, Ron Frenz	A-Next #7
Pharzoof	1999	DC	Chuck Dixon	Birds of Prey #6
Shiv	1999 (August)	DC	Geoff Johns, Lee Moder	Stars and S.T.R.I.P.E #1
Hangman	1999	DC		Batman: Dark Victory

== 2000s ==
Character / Team	Year Debuted	Company	Creator/s	First Appearance
Kyle Abbot	2000	DC	Greg Rucka	Detective Comics #743
Able Crown	2000	DC		Detective Comics #744
Agamemno	2000	DC		Silver Age #1
Orca	2000	DC	Larry Hama	Batman #579
Zeiss	2000	DC	Ed Brubaker, Scott McDaniel	Batman #582
Urizen	2000	Image Comics	Todd Mcfarlane	Spawn #93
Mortalla	2000	DC	Walt Simonson	Orion #6
Queen of Fables	2000	DC	Mark Waid, Gail Simone	JLA #47
Nero	2001	DC	Judd Winick, Darryl Banks, Mark Bright	Green Lantern Vol. 3 #132
Black, White Bandit	2001	DC	Dave Gibbons	Batman: Gotham Knights #12
Blacksmith	2001	DC	Geoff Johns, Ethan Van Sciver	Iron Heights
Double Down	2001	DC	Geoff Johns, Ethan Van Sciver	Flash: Iron Heights
Girder	2001	DC	Geoff Johns, Ethan Van Sciver	Flash: Iron Heights
Murmur	2001	DC	Geoff Johns, Ethan Van Sciver	Flash: Iron Heights
Simon Pure	2001	Image	Todd Mcfarlane	Spawn #107
Cicada	2001	DC	Geoff Johns, Scott Kollins	The Flash v2, #171
Onimar Synn	2001	DC	David S. Goyer, Geoff Johns	JSA #23
Tar Pit	2001	DC	Geoff Johns, Scott Kollins	Flash v.2 #174
Monsieur Stigmonus	2001	DC	J. M. DeMatteis, Ryan Sook	The Spectre v4 #6
Manchester Black	2001	DC	Joe Kelly, Doug Mahnke	Action Comics #775
Mongal	2001	DC		Superman #170
Morlun	2001 (June)	Marvel	J. Michael Straczynski, John Romita Jr.	The Amazing Spider-Man #471
Cassandra Nova	2001 (July)	Marvel	Grant Morrison, Frank Quitely	New X-Men #114
Imperiex	2001	DC		Our Worlds at War
Zoom	2001	DC	Geoff Johns, Scott Kolins	The Flash: Secret Files, Origins #3
Peek-a-Boo	2002	DC	Geoff Johns, Scott Kolins	Flash V.2, #180
Scorch	2002	DC		JLA #61
Mortician	2002	DC	Devin Grayson, Roger Robinson	Batman: Gotham Knights #28
Savant	2003 (August)	DC	Gail Simone, Ed Benes	Birds of Prey #56
Hush	2003	DC	Jeph Loeb, Jim Lee	Batman #609
Al-Tariq	2003	Marvel		New Deal
Great White Shark	2003	DC	Dan Slott, Ryan Sook	Arkham Asylum: Living Hell #1
Kira	2003		Tsugumi Ohba, Takeshi Obata	Death Note Vol. 1
Thragg	2003	Image	Robert Kirkman	Invincible #11
Equus	2004	DC	Brian Azzarello, Jim Lee	Superman #206
Owen Mercer	2004	DC	Brad Meltzer, Rags Morales	Identity Crisis #3
Angstorm Levy	2004	Image	Robert Kirkman	Invincible #16
Preus	2004	DC	Joe Kelly, Talent Caldwell	Superman 2nd series #202
Ord	2004	Marvel	Joss Whedon, John Cassaday	Astonishing X-Men 3rd series #1
Rainbow Raiders	2005	DC	Geoff Johns, Howard Porter	Flash v.2 #217
Batzarro	2005	DC	Jeph Loeb	Superman/Batman #20
Disciple	2005	Image	Todd McFarlane	Spawn #150
Marvel Zombies	2005	Marvel	Mark Millar, Greg Land, Robert Kirkman, Sean Phillips	Ultimate Fantastic Four #21
Amatsu-Mikaboshi	2006 (February)	Marvel	Michael Oeming, Scott Kolins	Thor: Blood Oath #6
Livewire	2006	DC	Evan Dorkin, Sarah Dyer, Bruce Timm	First Appearance: Superman: The Animated Series: Livewire; First Comic Appearance: Action Comics #835
Zera	2006	Image	Todd Mcfarlane	Spawn #154
Tally Man	2006	DC		Detective Comics #819
Arkillo	2006 (May)	DC	Geoff Johns, Ivan Reis	Green Lantern (vol. 4) #10
Talon	2006	DC		Teen Titans #38
Facade	2006	DC	Paul Dini	Detective Comics #821
Mister Negative	2007 (May)	Marvel	Dan Slott, Phil Jimenez	Free Comic Book Day: The Amazing Spider-Man #1
Atrocitus	2007 (December)	DC	Geoff Johns	Green Lantern vol. 4 #25
Larfleeze	2007 (December)	DC	Geoff Johns, Ethan Van Sciver	Green Lantern vol. 4 #25
Menace	2008	Marvel	Marc Guggenheim, Salvador Larroca	The Amazing Spider-Man #549
Screwball	2008 (July)	Marvel	Dan Slott, Marcos Martín	The Amazing Spider-Man #559
Professor Pyg	2009 (August)	DC	Grant Morrison, Andy Kubert	Batman and Robin #1
Omega Spawn	2009 (November)	Image Comics	Todd McFarlane	Image United #1
Beth Kane	2009 (August)	DC	Greg Rucka, J.H. Williams III	Detective Comics #854
Conquest	2009	Image Comics	Robert Kirkman	Invincible #61

== 2010s ==
Character / Team	Year Debuted	Company	Creator/s	First Appearance
Bludd	2010	Image	Todd Mcfarlane	Spawn #197
Allegra Garcia	2010 (December)	DC	Eric Wallace, Fabrizio Florentinom, Cliff Richards	Titans #28
Massacre	2011 (April)	Marvel	Dan Slott, Marcos Martin	The Amazing Spider-Man #655
The Maker	2011 (August)	Marvel	Jonathan Hickman	Ultimate Fallout #4
Court of Owls	2012 (February)	DC	Scott Snyder, Greg Capullo	Batman vol 2 #6
Gorr the God Butcher	2013 (January)	Marvel	Jason Aaron, Esad Ribic	Thor: God of Thunder #1
Robo-Chef	2013	Disney/Hyperion	Rhode Montijo	The Gumazing Gum Girl! Book 1: Chews Your Destiny
Bloodwork	2016 (August)	DC	Brian Buccellato	The Flash #28
Godspeed	2016 (August)	DC	Joshua Williamson, Carmine Di Giandomenico	The Flash: Rebirth #1
Muse	2016 (September)	Marvel	Charles Soule, Ron Garney	Daredevil vol 5 #11
The Hamster (Mr. Hansen)	2017	Disney/Hyperion	Rhode Montijo	The Gumazing Gum Girl! Book 2: Gum Luck
The Batman Who Laughs	2017 (May)	DC	Scott Snyder, Greg Capullo	Dark Days: The Casting #1
Knull	2018	Marvel	Donny Cates, Ryan Stegman	Venom vol 4 #3
Godsend	2019 (January)	Image Comics	Todd Mcfarlane	Spawn #293
The Underhander	2019	Disney/Hyperion	Rhode Montijo	The Gumazing Gum Girl! Book 4: Cover Blown!
The Cocodrilos	2019	Disney/Hyperion	Rhode Montijo	The Gumazing Gum Girl! Book 4: Cover Blown!

== 2020s ==
Character / Team	Year Debuted	Company	Creator/s	First Appearance
Punchline	2020 (April)	DC	James Tynion IV, Jorge Jiménez	Batman vol. 3 #89
The Designer	2020 (April)	DC	James Tynion IV, Jorge Jiménez	Batman vol. 3 #89
Plague Spawn	2021 (January)	Image Comics	Todd McFarlane	Spawn #314
Vengeance	2021 (June)	DC	James Tynion IV, Guillem March	The Joker vol. 2 #2
Respawn	2021 (June)	DC	Joshua Williamson, Gleb Melnikov	Robin vol. 3 #1
Devil Ray	2021 (November)	DC	Dwayne McDuffie	Black Manta #1
Theus	2021 (October)	Image Comics	Todd McFarlane	Gunslinger Spawn #1
Kira Kosov	2021 (November)	DC	James Tynion IV, Jorge Jiménez	Batman vol. 3 #112
The Forsaken	2021 (December)	Image Comics	Todd McFarlane	Spawn #325

== See also ==
- List of Dick Tracy villains
- List of superhero debuts
- List of years in comics

== Bibliography ==
- Daniels, Les. The Golden Age of DC Comics: 365 Days. New York: H.N. Abrams, 2004.
