= Emmett, Kansas =

City in Pottawatomie County, Kansas

- City
- Location within Pottawatomie County and Kansas

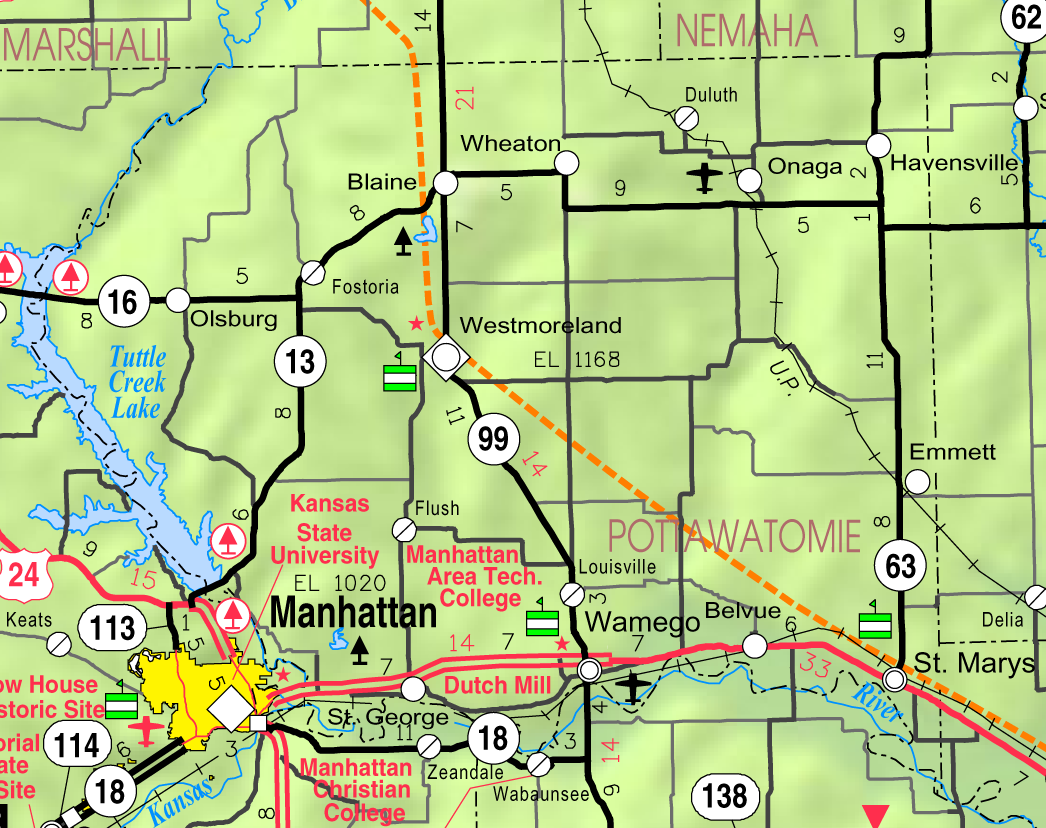
- KDOT map of Pottawatomie County (legend)
- Coordinates: 39°18′26″N 96°03′27″W
- Country: United States
- State: Kansas
- County: Pottawatomie
- Incorporated: 1920
- Named for: Robert Emmet

Area
  - Total: 0.20 sq mi (0.51 km^{2})
  - Land: 0.20 sq mi (0.51 km^{2})
  - Water: 0 sq mi (0.00 km^{2})
- Elevation: 1,024 ft (312 m)

Population (2020)
  - Total: 170
  - Density: 860/sq mi (330/km^{2})
- Time zone: UTC-6 (CST)
  - Summer (DST): UTC-5 (CDT)
- ZIP Code: 66422
- Area code: 785
- FIPS code: 20-21100
- GNIS ID: 2394690

Emmett is a city in Pottawatomie County, Kansas, United States. As of the 2020 census, the population of the city was 170.

== History ==
The first post office in Emmett was established in November 1905. The community was named for Robert Emmet, an Irish nationalist.

== Geography ==
According to the United States Census Bureau, the city has a total area of 0.20 square miles (0.52 km^{2}), all land.

== Demographics ==
Historical population
Census	Pop.	Note	%±
1930	268		—
1940	191		−28.7%
1950	143		−25.1%
1960	123		−14.0%
1970	156		26.8%
1980	223		42.9%
1990	165		−26.0%
2000	277		67.9%
2010	191		−31.0%
2020	170		−11.0%
U.S. Decennial Census

Emmett is part of the Manhattan, Kansas Metropolitan Statistical Area.

=== 2020 census ===
The 2020 United States census counted 170 people, 65 households, and 44 families in Emmett. The population density was 871.8 per square mile (336.6/km^{2}). There were 72 housing units at an average density of 369.2 per square mile (142.6/km^{2}). The racial makeup was 78.82% (134) white or European American (77.06% non-Hispanic white), 1.18% (2) black or African-American, 0.59% (1) Native American or Alaska Native, 0.59% (1) Asian, 0.0% (0) Pacific Islander or Native Hawaiian, 4.12% (7) from other races, and 14.71% (25) from two or more races. Hispanic or Latino of any race was 7.65% (13) of the population.

Of the 65 households, 38.5% had children under the age of 18; 47.7% were married couples living together; 27.7% had a female householder with no spouse or partner present. 27.7% of households consisted of individuals and 10.8% had someone living alone who was 65 years of age or older. The average household size was 2.4 and the average family size was 3.2. The percent of those with a bachelor's degree or higher was estimated to be 2.4% of the population.

37.1% of the population was under the age of 18, 4.1% from 18 to 24, 28.8% from 25 to 44, 18.2% from 45 to 64, and 11.8% who were 65 years of age or older. The median age was 29.3 years. For every 100 females, there were 78.9 males. For every 100 females ages 18 and older, there were 87.7 males.

The 2016–2020 5-year American Community Survey estimates show that the median household income was $34,500 (with a margin of error of +/- $29,441) and the median family income was $63,750 (+/- $28,602). Males had a median income of $25,000 (+/- $18,668) versus $21,250 (+/- $10,540) for females. The median income for those above 16 years old was $22,250 (+/- $9,647). Approximately, 13.6% of families and 15.7% of the population were below the poverty line, including 0.0% of those under the age of 18 and 16.7% of those ages 65 or over.

=== 2010 census ===
As of the census of 2010, there were 191 people, 71 households, and 43 families residing in the city. The population density was 955.0 inhabitants per square mile (368.7/km^{2}). There were 87 housing units at an average density of 435.0 per square mile (168.0/km^{2}). The racial makeup of the city was 89.0% White, 1.6% African American, 1.6% Native American, 0.5% Pacific Islander, 0.5% from other races, and 6.8% from two or more races. Hispanic or Latino of any race were 10.5% of the population.

There were 71 households, of which 36.6% had children under the age of 18 living with them, 47.9% were married couples living together, 2.8% had a female householder with no husband present, 9.9% had a male householder with no wife present, and 39.4% were non-families. 33.8% of all households were made up of individuals, and 8.4% had someone living alone who was 65 years of age or older. The average household size was 2.69 and the average family size was 3.58.

The median age in the city was 27.2 years. 33.5% of residents were under the age of 18; 14% were between the ages of 18 and 24; 20.4% were from 25 to 44; 21.9% were from 45 to 64; and 9.9% were 65 years of age or older. The gender makeup of the city was 56.0% male and 44.0% female.

=== 2000 census ===
As of the census of 2000, there were 277 people, 103 households, and 66 families residing in the city. The population density was 1,472.5 inhabitants per square mile (568.5/km^{2}). There were 139 housing units at an average density of 738.9 per square mile (285.3/km^{2}). The racial makeup of the city was 93.50% White, 5.42% Native American, and 1.08% from two or more races. Hispanic or Latino of any race were 1.44% of the population.

There were 103 households, out of which 30.1% had children under the age of 18 living with them, 49.5% were married couples living together, 9.7% had a female householder with no husband present, and 35.0% were non-families. 29.1% of all households were made up of individuals, and 8.7% had someone living alone who was 65 years of age or older. The average household size was 2.69 and the average family size was 3.40.

In the city, the population was spread out, with 33.6% under the age of 18, 5.8% from 18 to 24, 28.5% from 25 to 44, 21.3% from 45 to 64, and 10.8% who were 65 years of age or older. The median age was 34 years. For every 100 females, there were 103.7 males. For every 100 females age 18 and over, there were 109.1 males.

The median income for a household in the city was $27,778, and the median income for a family was $27,750. Males had a median income of $35,208 versus $14,750 for females. The per capita income for the city was $12,078. About 20.0% of families and 27.3% of the population were below the poverty line, including 46.3% of those under the age of eighteen and 17.1% of those 65 or over.

== Education ==
The community is served by Kaw Valley USD 321 public school district. High school students attend St. Marys Jr/Sr High School in St. Marys. The St. Marys High School mascot is Bears.

Emmett High School was closed through school unification. The Emmett High School mascot was Emmett Eagles.
