= Menoken Township, Kansas =

Township in Shawnee County, Kansas, U.S.

Menoken Township
- Township
- Location within Shawnee County
- Coordinates: 39.136819°N 95.771276°W
- Country: United States
- State: Kansas
- County: Shawnee
- Established: 1879

Government
  - Township Trustee: Steven Porubsky

Area
  - Total: 45.312 sq mi (117.36 km^{2})
  - Land: 44.411 sq mi (115.02 km^{2})
  - Water: 0.901 sq mi (2.33 km^{2}) 1.99%

Population (2020)
  - Total: 1,638
  - Density: 36.88/sq mi (14.24/km^{2})
- Time zone: UTC-6 (CST)
  - Summer (DST): UTC-5 (CDT)
- Area code: 785
- GNIS feature ID: 478460

Menoken Township is a township in Shawnee County, Kansas, United States. As of the 2020 census, its population was 1,638.

== History ==
Menoken Township was established on July 18, 1879, after being separated from Silver Lake Township. The township was home to the now extinct town of Menoken. Menoken was established in 1876. It was originally called Farmersville due to the large amount of farming that took place there. Many of the original settlers in the area were from Missouri. A tornado in 1917 killed five people and left 50 families homeless. By 1936, the town of Menoken had gone extinct.

== Geography ==
Menoken Township covers an area of 45.312 square miles (117.36 square kilometers). Shawnee State Fishing Lake lies within the township. The Kansas River and Soldier Creek flow through it, as well as Messhoss Creek.

=== Adjacent townships ===
Douglas Township, Jackson County
| Washington Township, Jackson County | northwest | north |
| Grove Township, Shawnee County | west | self | east | Soldier Township, Shawnee County |
| Silver Lake Township, Shawnee County | southwest | south |
Mission Township, Shawnee County

== Transportation ==
=== Major highways ===
- US-24
- US-75
