= Lake Shawnee =

Lake Shawnee may refer to:

- Lake Shawnee (New Jersey), a lake in Jefferson Township, New Jersey
- Lake Shawnee (Kansas), a lake in Shawnee County, Kansas
- Lake Shawnee, West Virginia, an unincorporated community
- Lake Shawnee Amusement Park, a defunct amusement park in Princeton, West Virginia
- Shawnee State Park (Pennsylvania), in Bedford County, Pennsylvania, containing Shawnee Lake

== See also ==
- Shawnee State Fishing Lake, Topeka, Kansas
