= Half Day =

Half Day or Halfday may refer to:

- Half Day, Illinois, a former unincorporated town in Lake County
- Halfday Creek, a river in Kansas
