= Grove Township, Shawnee County, Kansas =

Township in Shawnee County, Kansas, U.S.

Grove Township Shawnee County, Kansas
- Township
- Location within Shawnee County

- Location within the state of Kansas
- Coordinates: 39°10′13″N 95°51′24″W
- Country: United States
- State: Kansas
- County: Shawnee
- Established: 1918

Government
  - Township Trustee: Dennis Lowry

Area
  - Total: 29.941 sq mi (77.55 km^{2})
  - Land: 29.713 sq mi (76.96 km^{2})
  - Water: 0.228 sq mi (0.59 km^{2}) 0.76%

Population (2020)
  - Total: 734
  - Density: 24.7/sq mi (9.54/km^{2})
- Time zone: UTC-6 (CST)
  - Summer (DST): UTC-5 (CDT)
- Area code: 785
- GNIS feature ID: 478451
- Website: grovetownshipks.com

Grove Township is a township in Shawnee County, Kansas, United States. As of the 2020 census, its population was 734.

== History ==
Grove Township was organized in 1918 from Silver Lake Township.

== Geography ==
Grove Township covers an area of 29.941 square miles (77.55 square kilometers). Soldier Creek flows through it, as well as Walnut Creek.

=== Political districts ===
- Kansas's 2nd congressional district

=== Adjacent townships ===
Washington Township, Jackson County
		north
Rossville Township, Shawnee County	west	self	east	Menoken Township, Shawnee County
		south
Silver Lake Township, Shawnee County

== Demographics ==
The township is part of the Topeka metropolitan area.

As of the 2020 Census, there were 734 people and 415 households residing in the township. The population density was 24.7 people per square mile. The racial makeup of the township was; White 91.0%, Asian 0.4%, Native American 0.3%, Pacific Islander 0.1%, and other 8.2%.

In the township the median age was 51.3 years.
