= Tecumseh Township, Kansas =

Township in Shawnee County, Kansas, U.S.

Tecumseh Township
- Township
- Location within Shawnee County
- Coordinates: 39.022326°N 95.564464°W
- Country: United States
- State: Kansas
- County: Shawnee
- Established: 1855

Government
  - Township Trustee: Roy Malloy

Area
  - Total: 34.681 sq mi (89.82 km^{2})
  - Land: 33.178 sq mi (85.93 km^{2})
  - Water: 1.503 sq mi (3.89 km^{2}) 4.33%

Population (2020)
  - Total: 7,753
  - Density: 233.7/sq mi (90.22/km^{2})
- Time zone: UTC-6 (CST)
  - Summer (DST): UTC-5 (CDT)
- Area code: 785
- GNIS feature ID: 479098

Tecumseh Township is a township in Shawnee County, Kansas, United States. As of the 2020 census, its population was 7,753.

== History ==
Tecumseh Township was established at the first Shawnee County board meeting on September 14, 1855. Many reorganizations of townships occurred up to 1860 but Tecumseh Township remained. On April 20, 1860, Monmouth Township was separated from Tecumseh Township.

== Geography ==
Tecumseh Township covers an area of 34.681 square miles (89.82 square kilometers). Lake Jivaro and part of Lake Shawnee lie within the township. The Kansas River flows through it, as well as Shunganunga Creek, Stinson Creek, Tecumseh Creek, and Whetstone Creek.

=== Communities ===
- Tecumseh
- part of Watson

=== Adjacent townships ===
Kaw Township, Jefferson County
Soldier Township, Shawnee County	northwest	north
Topeka Township, Shawnee County	west	self	east	Lecompton Township, Douglas County
		south	southeast	Kanwaka Township, Douglas County
Monmouth Township, Shawnee County

== Transportation ==
=== Major highways ===
- I-70 / Kansas Turnpike
- I-470 / Kansas Turnpike
- US-40
- K-4
