= Washington Township, Jackson County, Kansas =

Washington Township
- Township
- Location in Jackson County
- Coordinates: 39°13′45″N 95°56′01″W
- Country: United States
- State: Kansas
- County: Jackson

Area
  - Total: 53.69 sq mi (139.06 km^{2})
  - Land: 53.62 sq mi (138.88 km^{2})
  - Water: 0.073 sq mi (0.19 km^{2}) 0.14%
- Elevation: 1,020 ft (310 m)

Population (2020)
  - Total: 556
  - Density: 10.4/sq mi (4.00/km^{2})
- GNIS feature ID: 0476262

Washington Township is a township in Jackson County, Kansas, USA. As of the 2020 census, its population was 556.

== Geography ==
Washington Township covers an area of 53.69 square miles (139.06 square kilometers); of this, 0.07 square miles (0.19 square kilometers) or 0.14 percent is water. The streams of Dutch Creek, Illinois Creek, James Creek, Salt Creek and Sullivan Creek run through this township.

=== Cities and towns ===
- Delia

=== Adjacent townships ===
- Adrian Township (north)
- Lincoln Township (northeast)
- Douglas Township (east)
- Grove Township, Shawnee County (southeast)
- Menoken Township, Shawnee County (southeast)
- Rossville Township, Shawnee County (south)
- Emmett Township, Pottawatomie County (west)
- St. Marys Township, Pottawatomie County (west)

=== Cemeteries ===
The township contains one cemetery, Delia.
