= Douglas Township, Jackson County, Kansas =

Douglas Township
- Township
- Location in Jackson County
- Coordinates: 39°16′00″N 95°41′26″W
- Country: United States
- State: Kansas
- County: Jackson

Area
  - Total: 64.81 sq mi (167.86 km^{2})
  - Land: 64.77 sq mi (167.75 km^{2})
  - Water: 0.042 sq mi (0.11 km^{2}) 0.07%
- Elevation: 1,053 ft (321 m)

Population (2020)
  - Total: 2,146
  - Density: 33.13/sq mi (12.79/km^{2})
- GNIS feature ID: 0478303

Douglas Township is a township in Jackson County, Kansas, United States. As of the 2020 census, its population was 2,146.

== History ==
Douglas Township was organized in 1855.

== Geography ==
Douglas Township covers an area of 64.81 square miles (167.86 square kilometers); of this, 0.04 square miles (0.11 square kilometers) or 0.07 percent is water. The streams of Middle Fork Muddy Creek and Spring Creek run through this township.

=== Communities ===
- Hoyt

=== Adjacent townships ===
- Cedar Township (north)
- Delaware Township, Jefferson County (northeast)
- Rock Creek Township, Jefferson County (east)
- Soldier Township, Shawnee County (south)
- Menoken Township, Shawnee County (southwest)
- Lincoln Township (northwest)
- Washington Township (west)

=== Cemeteries ===
The township contains four cemeteries: Hoyt, Hoyt, Mayetta and Steward.

=== Major highways ===
- U.S. Route 75
