= Pottawatomie Indian Pay Station =

- U.S. National Register of Historic Places
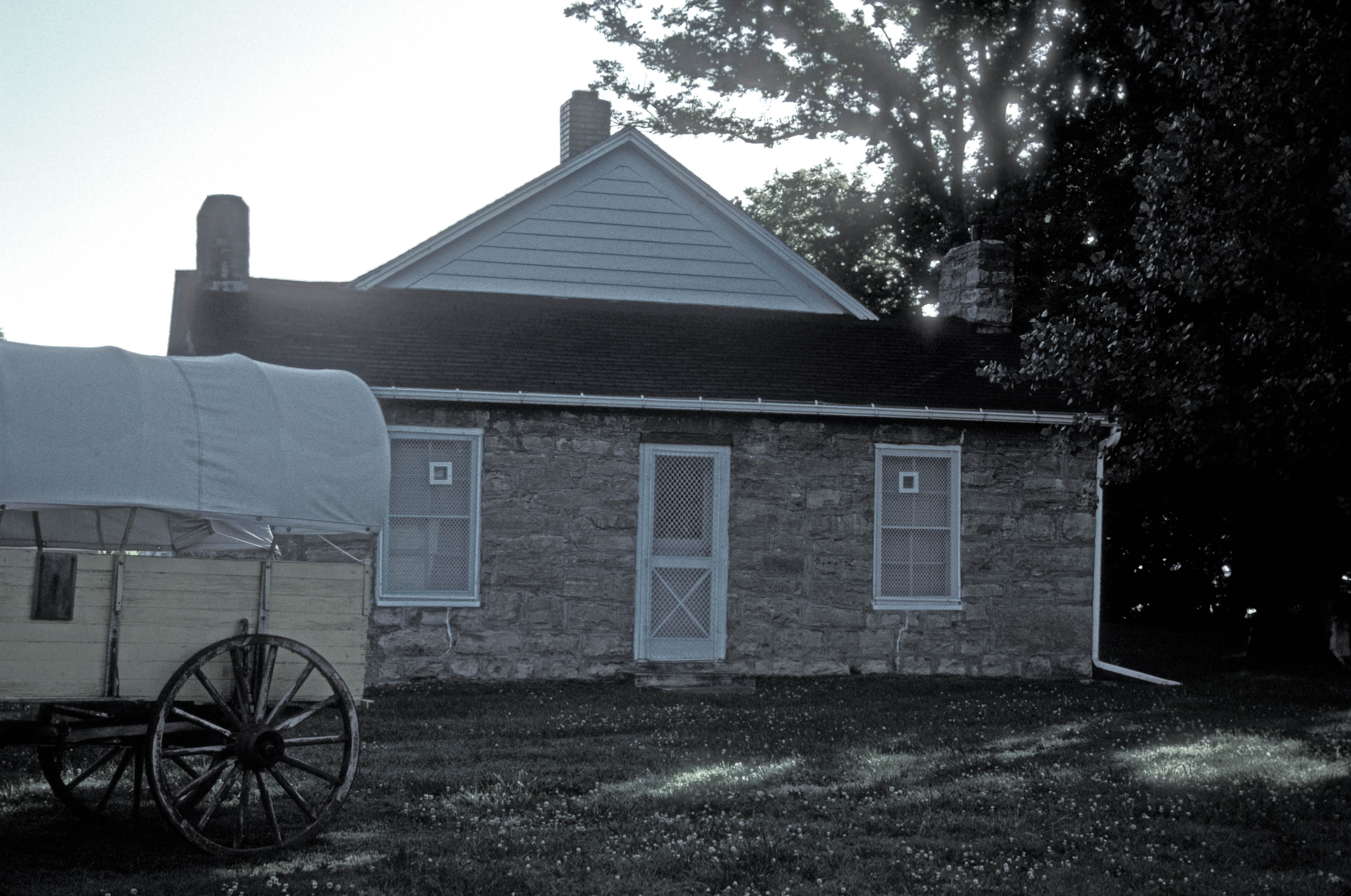
- Nearest city: St. Marys, Kansas
- Coordinates: 39°11′30″N 96°03′42″W
- Area: 1 acre (0.40 ha)
- Built: 1855
- NRHP reference No.: 72000521
- Added to NRHP: April 13, 1972

Pottawatomie Indian Pay Station is a historic building in St. Marys, Kansas and associated with the Potawatomi tribe.

It was built of stone in 1855 for use by government agents in paying a regular annuity to Potawatomi tribe members who had agreed to move from the Great Lakes region in exchange for reservation land in Kansas. It is the oldest surviving building in the town and county and the oldest part of St. Mary's Mission. The building was added to the National Register of Historic Places in 1972.
