= Mission Township, Shawnee County, Kansas =

Township in Shawnee County, Kansas, U.S.

Mission Township
- Township
- Location within Shawnee County
- Coordinates: 38.999439°N 95.78478°W
- Country: United States
- State: Kansas
- County: Shawnee
- Established: 1871
- Named for: Christian mission

Government
  - Township Trustee: Annette Beck

Area
  - Total: 29.363 sq mi (76.05 km^{2})
  - Land: 28.03 sq mi (72.6 km^{2})
  - Water: 1.333 sq mi (3.45 km^{2}) 4.54%

Population (2020)
  - Total: 10,055
  - Density: 358.7/sq mi (138.5/km^{2})
- Time zone: UTC-6 (CST)
  - Summer (DST): UTC-5 (CDT)
- Area code: 785
- GNIS feature ID: 478655
- Website: missiontownship.com

Mission Township is a township in Shawnee County, Kansas, United States. As of the 2020 census, its population was 10,055.

== History ==
Mission Township was created in 1871 from parts of Dover Township and Topeka Township. The first settler in what was to become Mission Township was Jonas Lykins, who settled there in the fall of 1847. The Pottawatomie Baptist Mission, to which the township lends its name, was established in 1848 and in operation until 1861.. Mission Township has since lost several parts of land to the growing city of Topeka.

== Geography ==
Mission Township covers an area of 29.363 square miles (76.05 square kilometers). Lake Sherwood lies within the township. The Kansas River flows through it, as well as Sixmile Creek and Shunganunga Creek.

=== Adjacent townships ===
Menoken Township, Shawnee County
Silver Lake Township, Shawnee County	northwest	north
Dover Township, Shawnee County	west	self	east	Topeka Township, Shawnee County
Auburn Township, Shawnee County	southwest		southeast	Williamsport Township, Shawnee County

== Transportation ==
=== Major highways ===
- I-70
- I-335 / Kansas Turnpike
- US-40
- K-4
