= Deep Six =

Deep Six may refer to:

== Books and comics ==
- Deep Six (comics), a set-index article listing several uses, including:
  - Deep Six (Marvel Comics), two different Marvel Comics teams
  - Deep Six (DC Comics), a 1971 DC Comics supervillain team
  - Deep Six (G.I. Joe), a fictional character in the G.I. Joe universe
- Deep Six (novel), a 1984 Dirk Pitt novel by Clive Cussler
- The Deep Six (novel), a 1953 novel by Martin Dibner; basis for the 1958 film (see below)
- Deepsix, a 2000 science fiction novel by Jack McDevitt

== Film and television ==
- The Deep Six, a 1958 World War II war film directed by Rudolph Maté
- Deep Six (Teen Titans), a television episode
- DeepStar Six, a 1989 American horror/scifi film based in an underwater military research facility

== Music ==
- The Deep Six (band), a 1960s American pop/rock band
- Deep Six (album), a compilation of Seattle alternative rock bands, 1986
- "Deep Six" (song), by Marilyn Manson, 2014
- "Deep Six", a song by Big Black from Racer-X, 1994
- "Deep Six", a song by Matthew Good Band from Underdogs, 1997

== Other uses ==
- Deep Six (Alberta politics), a group of Progressive Conservative members of the Legislative Assembly of Alberta, elected in the 1993 provincial election
- Deep Six, a move used by the professional wrestler Baron Corbin
