= Rossville Township, Kansas =

Township in Shawnee County, Kansas, U.S.

Rossville Township
- Township
- Location within Shawnee County
- Coordinates: 39.162001°N 95.965504°W
- Country: United States
- State: Kansas
- County: Shawnee
- Established: 1871

Government
  - Township Trustee: Jeff Wehner

Area
  - Total: 51.662 sq mi (133.80 km^{2})
  - Land: 50.783 sq mi (131.53 km^{2})
  - Water: 0.879 sq mi (2.28 km^{2}) 1.70%

Population (2020)
  - Total: 1,882
  - Density: 37.06/sq mi (14.31/km^{2})
- Time zone: UTC-6 (CST)
  - Summer (DST): UTC-5 (CDT)
- Area code: 785
- GNIS feature ID: 476449

Rossville Township is a township in Shawnee County, Kansas, United States. As of the 2020 census, its population was 1,882.

== History ==
Rossville Township was organized in January 1871 after being separated from Silver Lake Township.

== Geography ==
Rossvile Township covers an area of 51.662 square miles (133.80 square kilometers). The Kansas River flows through it, as well as Cross Creek, Bourbonnais Creek, and Snake Creek.

=== Communities ===
- Rossville

=== Adjacent townships ===
Washington Township, Jackson County
		north	northeast	Grove Township, Shawnee County
St. Marys Township, Pottawatomie County	west	self	east	Silver Lake Township, Shawnee County
		south	southeast	Dover Township, Shawnee County
Maple Hill Township, Wabaunsee County

== Transportation ==
=== Major highways ===
- US-24
