= St. Mary's Mission (Kansas) =

Jesuit mission founded in 1847 along the Oregon Trail

Coordinates: 39°11′30″N 96°03′44″W

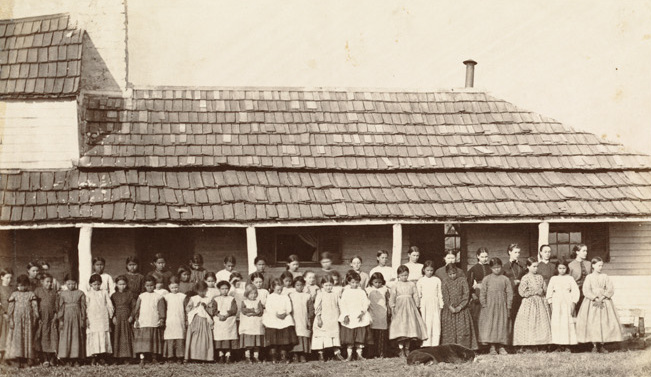
Potawatomi girls at St. Mary's Mission, Kansas, ca. 1867

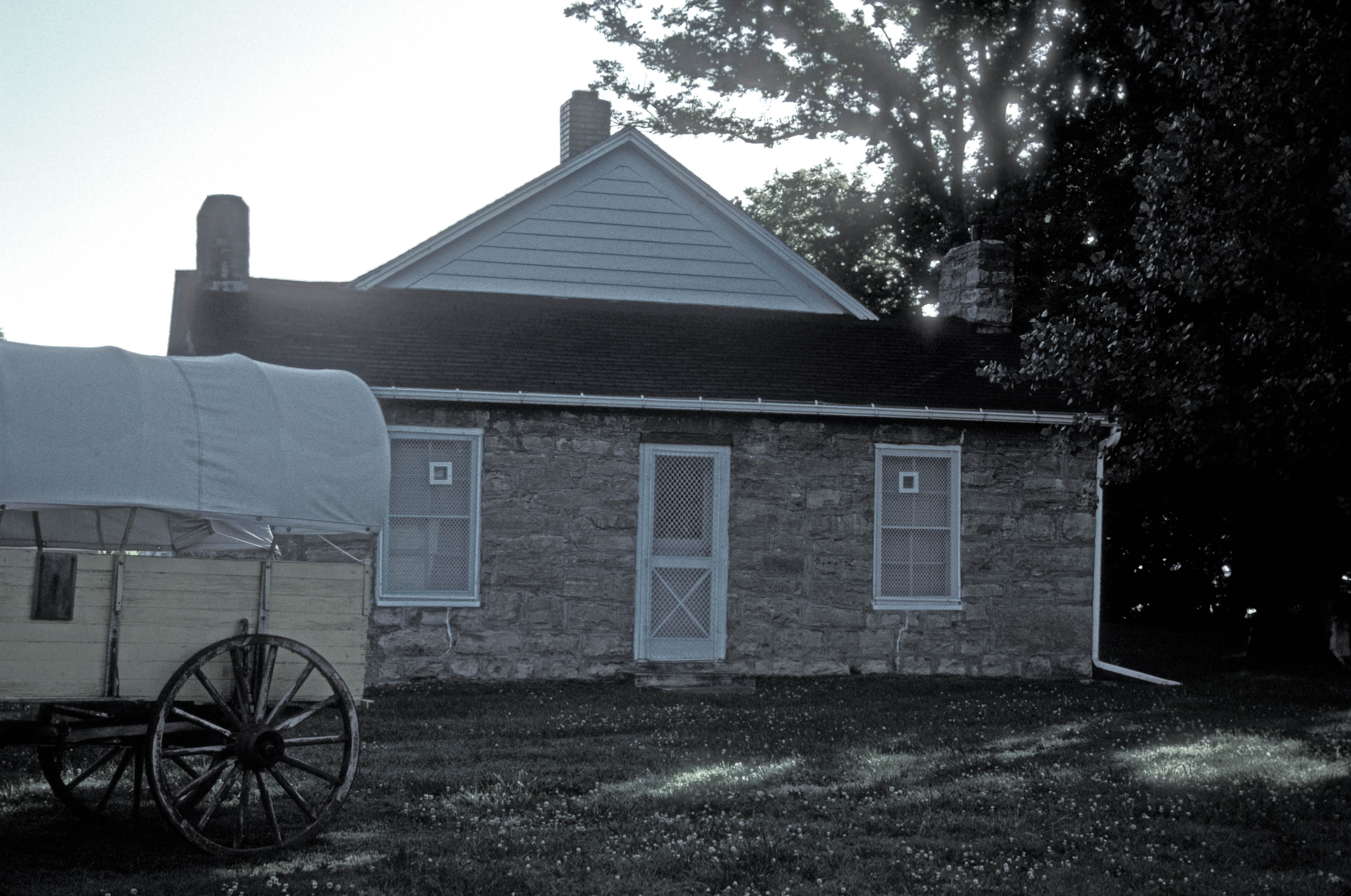
The Pottawatomie Indian Pay Station (1855)

St. Mary's Mission was a Jesuit mission founded in 1847 along the Oregon Trail. The Pottawatomie Indian Pay Station was built in 1857 for use by U.S. government agents to pay an annuity to the Potawatomi Indians who had relocated to the area from the Great Lakes region. The city of St. Marys, Kansas, was established around the mission. During the 19th and 20th centuries, Native American children were often forced to attend Mission Schools. At St. Mary's, parents sent their students to the school. The sisters and the priests insisted on teaching the students not only in English and French, but also in the Potawatomi language to preserve their native culture.

== In popular culture ==
- St. Mary's Mission is one of the stops in the video game Oregon Trail II.

== See also ==
- List of Jesuit sites
