= Kaw Valley USD 321 =

Public school district in St. Marys, Kansas

Address
- 411 W. Lasley St. St. Marys, Kansas, 66536; United States
- Coordinates: 39°11′31″N 96°04′13″W

District information
- Type: Public
- Grades: Pre-K to 12
- Schools: 4

Other information
- Website: kawvalley.k12.ks.us

Kaw Valley USD 321 is a public unified school district headquartered in St. Marys, Kansas, United States. The district includes the communities of St. Marys, Delia, Emmett, Rossville, Willard, Saint Clere, and nearby rural areas.

== Schools ==
The school district operates the following schools:

- St. Marys Jr/Sr High School
- Rossville Jr/Sr High School
- St. Marys Grade School
- Rossville Grade School

== See also ==
- Kansas State Department of Education
- Kansas State High School Activities Association
- List of high schools in Kansas
- List of unified school districts in Kansas
