= Silver Lake Township, Kansas =

Township in Shawnee County, Kansas, U.S.

Silver Lake Township
- Township
- Location within Shawnee County
- Coordinates: 39.102387°N 95.859052°W
- Country: United States
- State: Kansas
- County: Shawnee
- Established: 1868

Government
  - Township Trustee: Georgia Ransone

Area
  - Total: 18.392 sq mi (47.64 km^{2})
  - Land: 17.801 sq mi (46.10 km^{2})
  - Water: 0.591 sq mi (1.53 km^{2}) 3.21%

Population (2020)
  - Total: 1,942
  - Density: 109.1/sq mi (42.12/km^{2})
- Time zone: UTC-6 (CST)
  - Summer (DST): UTC-5 (CDT)
- Area code: 785
- GNIS feature ID: 478452

Silver Lake Township is a township in Shawnee County, Kansas, United States. As of the 2020 census, its population was 1,942.

== History ==
Silver Lake Township was organized on March 16, 1868 from part of Soldier Township. Parts of Silver Lake were made into three townships: Rossville Township in 1871, Menoken Township in 1879, and Grove Township in 1918.

== Geography ==
Silver Lake Township covers an area of 18.392 square miles (47.64 square kilometers). The Kansas River flows through it, as well as Ensign Creek.

=== Communities ===
- Silver Lake

=== Adjacent townships ===
Grove Township, Shawnee County
		north
Rossville Township, Shawnee County	west	self	east	Menoken Township, Shawnee County
		south	southeast	Mission Township, Shawnee County
Dover Township, Shawnee County

== Transportation ==
=== Major highways ===
- US-24
