= Dover Township, Kansas =

Township in Shawnee County, Kansas, U.S.

Dover Township
- Township
- Location within Shawnee County
- Coordinates: 39.00°N 95.88°W
- Country: United States
- State: Kansas
- County: Shawnee
- Established: 1867

Government
  - Township Trustee: Kevin Thompson

Area
  - Total: 56.967 sq mi (147.54 km^{2})
  - Land: 55.712 sq mi (144.29 km^{2})
  - Water: 1.255 sq mi (3.25 km^{2}) 2.20%

Population (2020)
  - Total: 1,677
  - Density: 30.10/sq mi (11.62/km^{2})
- Time zone: UTC-6 (CST)
  - Summer (DST): UTC-5 (CDT)
- Area code: 785
- GNIS feature ID: 478641

Dover Township is a township in Shawnee County, Kansas, United States. As of the 2020 census, its population was 1,677.

== History ==
Dover Township was established in the fall of 1867 from Auburn Township. The first officers of the township were elected May 5, 1868. The first church was a Baptist church, made in 1869 and the reverend being Rev. Mr. Raymond.

== Geography ==
Dover Township covers an area of 56.967 square miles (147.54 square kilometers). The Kansas River, Mission Creek, and Blacksmith Creek flow through it, as well as Post Creek, Vassar Creek, and Haskell Creek.

=== Communities ===
- part of Willard
- Dover

=== Adjacent townships ===
Silver Lake Township, Shawnee County
Rossville Township, Shawnee County	northwest	north
Maple Hill Township, Wabaunsee County	west	self	east	Mission Township, Shawnee County
Mission Creek Township, Wabaunsee County	southwest	south
Auburn Township, Shawnee County

== Transportation ==
=== Major highways ===
- I-70
- US-40
- K-4
