= St. Marys, Kansas =

City in Kansas, US

Saint Marys, Kansas
- City
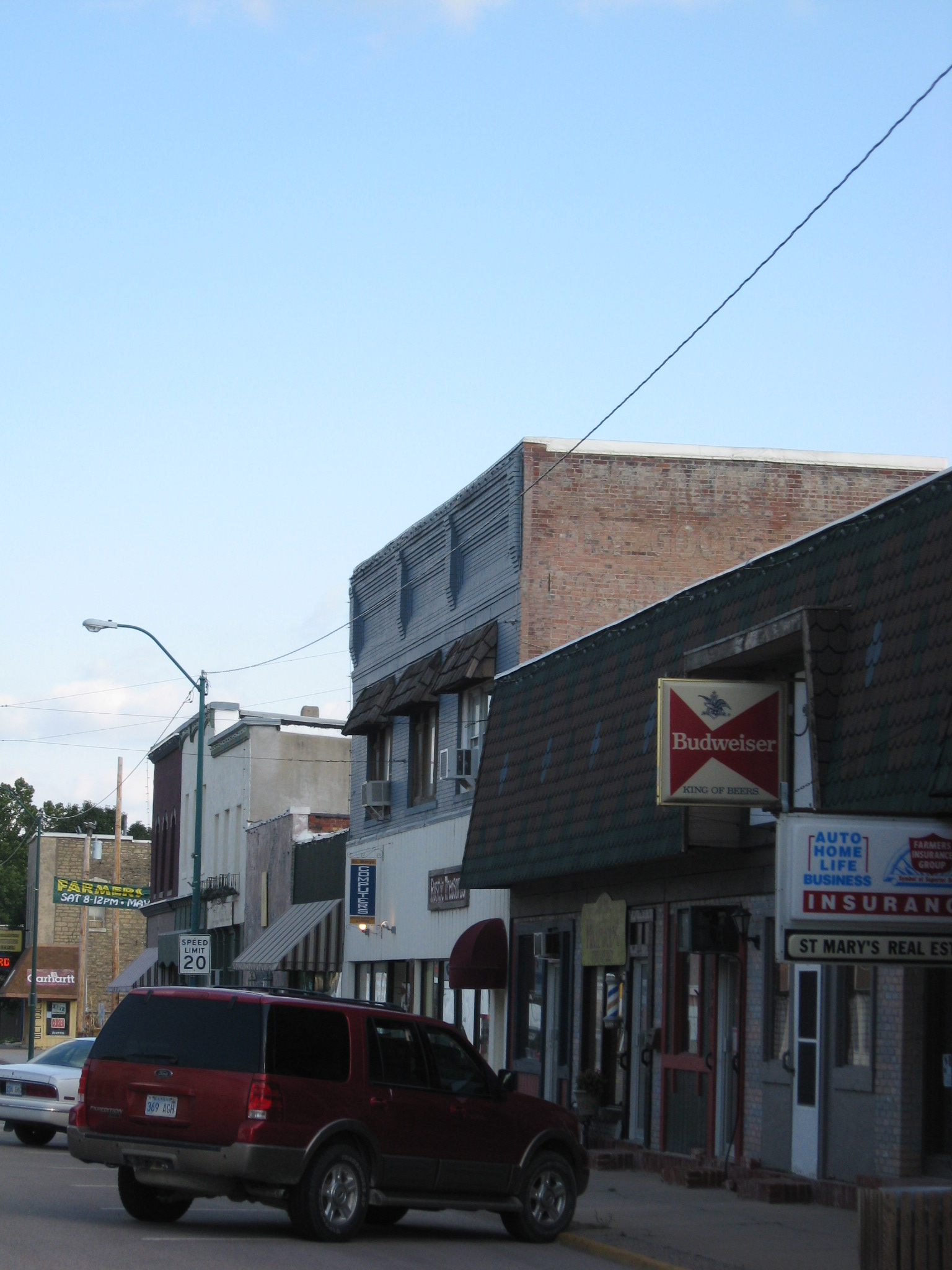
- Downtown St. Marys (2009)

- Location within Pottawatomie County and Kansas

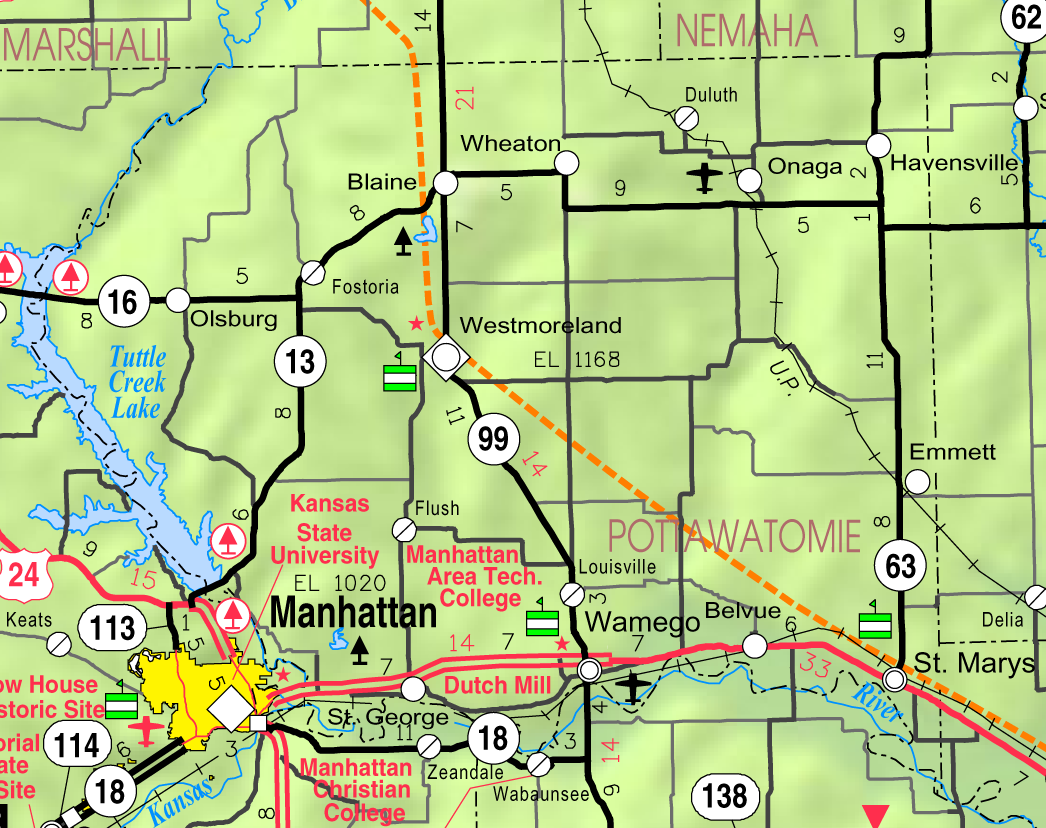
- KDOT map of Pottawatomie County (legend)
- Coordinates: 39°11′39″N 96°03′51″W
- Country: United States
- State: Kansas
- Counties: Pottawatomie, Wabaunsee
- Founded: 1860s
- Platted: 1866
- Incorporated: 1869
- Named for: St. Mary's Mission

Government
  - Type: Mayor–Council
  - Mayor: John-Paul Rutledge

Area
  - Total: 1.18 sq mi (3.05 km^{2})
  - Land: 1.18 sq mi (3.05 km^{2})
  - Water: 0 sq mi (0.00 km^{2})
- Elevation: 1,024 ft (312 m)

Population (2020)
  - Total: 2,759
  - Density: 2,340/sq mi (905/km^{2})
- Time zone: UTC-6 (CST)
  - Summer (DST): UTC-5 (CDT)
- ZIP Code: 66536
- Area code: 785
- FIPS code: 20-62400
- GNIS ID: 2396507
- Website: smks.info

St. Marys or Saint Marys is a city in Pottawatomie and Wabaunsee counties in Kansas of the United States. As of the 2020 census, the population of the city was 2,759.

== History ==
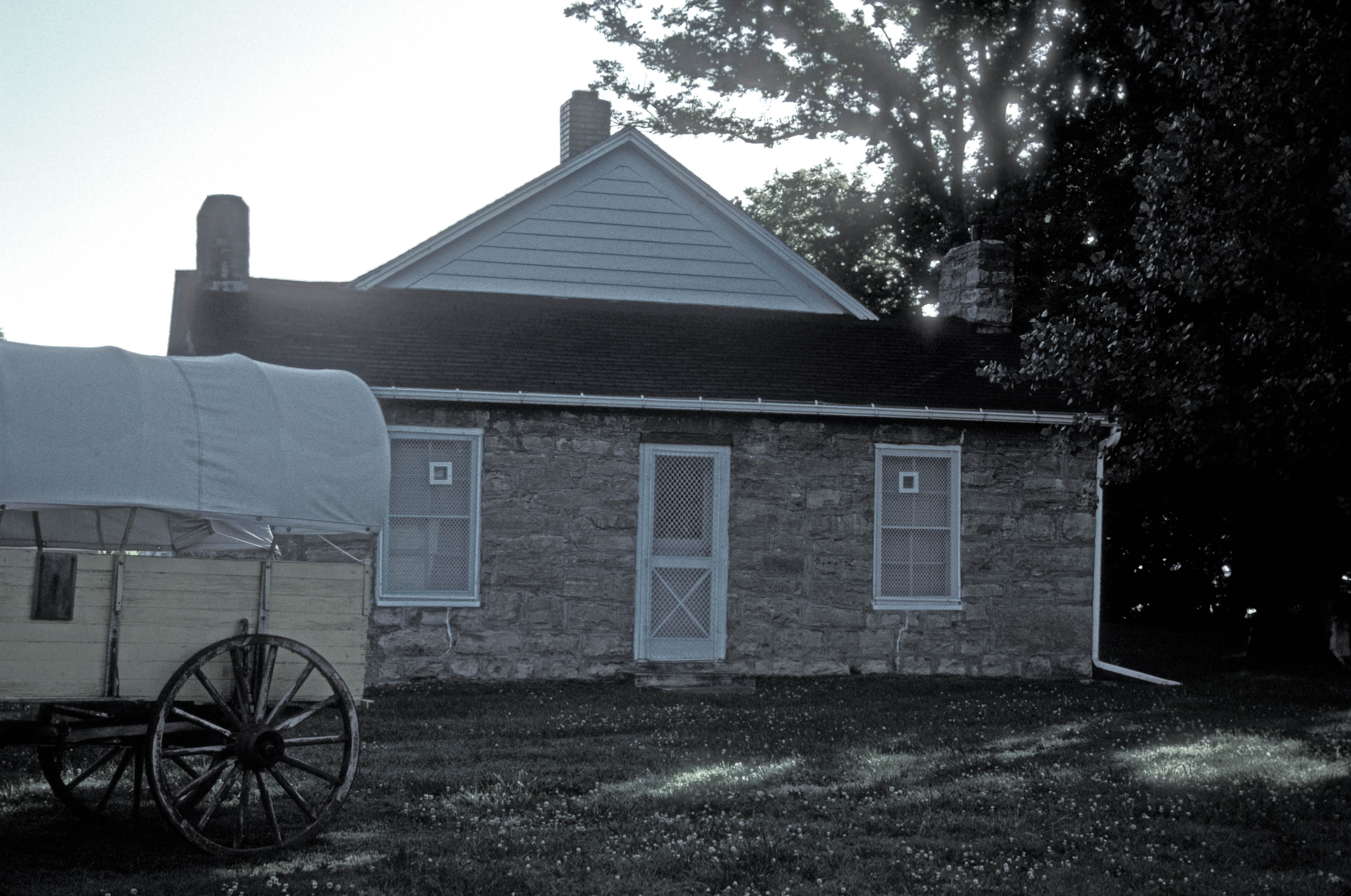
The Pottawatomie Indian Pay Station (1855)

St. Marys was laid out as a community in 1866. It was named after the St. Mary's Mission.

The oldest surviving mission building is the Pottawatomie Indian Pay Station which was built in 1855 and was used by government agents to pay an annuity to the Pottawatomie Indians who relocated to the area from the Great Lakes region. It was added to the National Register of Historic Places in 1972.

Starting in the 1980s, supporters of the Society of Saint Pius X began moving to St. Marys, attracted by the presence of the SSPX in the community as well as the relative isolation of the city from the modern world. Since then the number of residents in St. Marys affiliated with the SSPX has grown considerably, to the point where in 2020 that they formed the majority of the city's population. The growth of the SSPX has been a source of tension with some older residents who are not members of the movement and who do not share the Society's socially conservative values.

== Geography ==
According to the United States Census Bureau, the city has a total area of 1.18 square miles (3.06 km^{2}), all land.

The city is located approximately 20 miles west of Topeka on U.S. Route 24.

== Demographics ==
Historical population
Census	Pop.	Note	%±
1880	884		—
1890	1,174		32.8%
1900	1,390		18.4%
1910	1,397		0.5%
1920	1,321		−5.4%
1930	1,304		−1.3%
1940	1,132		−13.2%
1950	1,201		6.1%
1960	1,509		25.6%
1970	1,434		−5.0%
1980	1,598		11.4%
1990	1,791		12.1%
2000	2,198		22.7%
2010	2,627		19.5%
2020	2,759		5.0%
U.S. Decennial Census

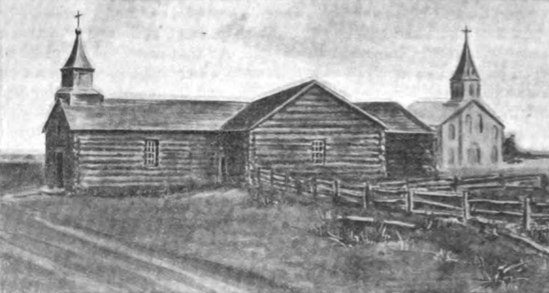
Catholic church in St. Marys, 1851

It is part of the Manhattan metropolitan area. It is known for its sizeable Catholic population.

=== 2020 census ===
As of the 2020 census, St. Marys had a population of 2,759. The median age was 27.2 years. 36.9% of residents were under the age of 18 and 16.0% of residents were 65 years of age or older. For every 100 females there were 92.4 males, and for every 100 females age 18 and over there were 92.3 males age 18 and over.

0.0% of residents lived in urban areas, while 100.0% lived in rural areas.

There were 839 households in St. Marys, of which 35.6% had children under the age of 18 living in them. Of all households, 52.8% were married-couple households, 19.0% were households with a male householder and no spouse or partner present, and 25.6% were households with a female householder and no spouse or partner present. About 29.2% of all households were made up of individuals and 16.0% had someone living alone who was 65 years of age or older.

There were 928 housing units, of which 9.6% were vacant. The homeowner vacancy rate was 1.5% and the rental vacancy rate was 11.4%.

Racial composition as of the 2020 census
Race	Number	Percent
White	2,345	85.0%
Black or African American	10	0.4%
American Indian and Alaska Native	23	0.8%
Asian	20	0.7%
Native Hawaiian and Other Pacific Islander	4	0.1%
Some other race	49	1.8%
Two or more races	308	11.2%
Hispanic or Latino (of any race)	331	12.0%

=== 2010 census ===
At the 2010 census there were 2,627 people, 836 households, and 560 families living in the city. The population density was 2,226.3 inhabitants per square mile (859.6/km^{2}). There were 900 housing units at an average density of 762.7 per square mile (294.5/km^{2}). The racial makeup of the city was 91.1% White, 1.1% African American, 1.4% Native American, 0.5% Asian, 2.3% from other races, and 3.6% from two or more races. Hispanic or Latino of any race were 9.0%.

Of the 836 households 37.6% had children under the age of 18 living with them, 54.4% were married couples living together, 9.0% had a female householder with no husband present, 3.6% had a male householder with no wife present, and 33.0% were non-families. 29.5% of households were one person and 14.7% were one person aged 65 or older. The average household size was 3.10 and the average family size was 4.04.

The median age was 26.8 years. 38.5% of residents were under the age of 18; 9.6% were between the ages of 18 and 24; 19.8% were from 25 to 44; 18.7% were from 45 to 64; and 13.6% were 65 or older. The gender makeup of the city was 48.0% male and 52.0% female.

=== Religion ===
There is a Catholic church, a traditionalist Catholic organization (Society of Saint Pius X), a Baptist church, and a Methodist church in St. Marys.

==== Catholic Church ====
The Catholic church in St. Marys is Immaculate Conception Church, which is a parish church under the jurisdiction of the Archdiocese of Kansas City in Kansas.

==== Society of Saint Pius X ====
The largest and newest church in St. Marys is the Immaculata Church, which is under the jurisdiction of the Society of Saint Pius X (SSPX), a named schismatic association officially separated from the Holy See.

The Immaculata was consecrated in a ceremony on May 3, 2023, by Bishop Bernard Fellay. The New Immaculata Church is one of the largest churches in the state with seating for 1,580.

A majority of St. Marys' inhabitants are affiliated with the SSPX; this has created tensions with some older residents who are not followers of the movement and who do not share the SSPX's socially conservative values. Tensions also exist between the SSPX-affiliated community and members of the diocesan Catholic parish of the town.

== Education ==
The city is served by Kaw Valley USD 321 public school district, located in St. Marys, which provides education from pre-K to 12. It has four schools, two schools are located in St. Marys: St. Marys Jr/Sr High School and St. Marys Grade School.

A private school, St. Mary's Academy and College includes grades K–12 as well as a two- and four-year college program. The Society of Saint Pius X operates the school.

== See also ==
- Controversies surrounding the Society of Saint Pius X
