= Black' Smith =

Restaurant information
- Food type: Italian
- Location: South Korea

Black' Smith (Korean: 블랙스미스) is an Italian restaurant franchise in South Korea. It is operated by the Caffe Bene chain, which also operates in South Korea.
