= St. Marys High School =

Location
- 601 East Lasley; St. Marys, KS; 39°11′10″N 96°03′28″W

Information
- School type: Public high school
- Established: 1895
- School district: Kaw Valley USD 321
- Principal: Adam Hurla
- Teaching staff: 26.20 (FTE)
- Grades: 7-12
- Enrollment: 254 (2023–2024)
- Student to teacher ratio: 9.69
- Colors: Blue; White
- Athletics conference: Big East League (est. 2024)
- Mascot: Bears
- Rival: Silver Lake and Rossville
- Newspaper: Press Paw (discontinued ca. 2009)
- Website: St. Marys Jr/Sr High School

St. Marys High School is a fully accredited public high school located in St. Marys, Kansas, United States, serving students in grades 9–12. It is operated by Kaw Valley USD 321. The school colors are blue and white and the school mascot is the Bear. The average annual enrollment (7-12) is approximately 250 students.

== History ==
St. Marys was established in 1869. A parochial school began in 1881. The frame building was moved from the "hill" to 5th Street in 1887 and a new, stone structure was dedicated in 1893. A transportation system, developed in 1909, consisted of a team and wagon to meet students crossing the river by ferry.

The former St. Marys High School building was built in 1931 across from the current swimming pool on Lasley Street. The public and parochial schools merged in 1946. In 1966, St. Marys, Rossville, Emmett and Delia combined to become one district, USD 321, Kaw Valley.

A bond issue in 1978 brought about the construction of a new building at 601 E. Lasley, on the old Jesuit college grounds. Students moved to the new building in 1981. A football field was added in 1982 and a track was installed in 1983. The old St. Marys High School was demolished in 1983. The shop addition was converted into a senior citizen center. Old Hill School was sold to the city of St. Marys in 1982 and razed in 1983.

The first graduating class of St. Marys High was the class of 1899, thus making them the 100th graduating class.

== Extracurricular activities ==
St. Marys is a member of the Kansas State High School Activities Association and offers a variety of sports programs. Extracurricular activities are also offered in the form of performing arts, school publications, and clubs.

=== Athletics ===
Athletic teams compete in the 3A division and are known as the "Bears". As of 2024, they compete in the Big East League, a combination of 11 teams from the Mid-East League and Big Seven League. St. Marys is classified as a 3A school, the fourth-largest classification in Kansas according to the Kansas State High School Activities Association. St. Marys has won multiple state championships in various sports.

In 2009, the athletics program was ranked as the top athletics program in the state of Kansas according to Sports Illustrated.

=== State championships ===
State Championships
Season	Sport/cctivity	Number of championships	Year
Fall	Volleyball	4	1999, 2003, 2007, 2008
Winter	Basketball, boys'	1	2009
Winter	Basketball, girls'	3	1982, 2000, 2009
Spring	Golf, boys'	3	1988, 1989, 2004
Spring	Softball	8	1997, 1998, 2000, 2002, 2003, 2004, 2008, 2009
Spring	Debate	1	1981
Total		20	

=== School publications ===
The school newspaper is known as the Press Paw and is a member of the High School National Ad Network. This publication was discontinued circa 2009.

== See also ==
- List of high schools in Kansas
- List of unified school districts in Kansas
