= Shawnee State Fishing Lake =

- Location within Kansas
- Location: Shawnee County, Kansas
- Coordinates: 39°12′17″N 95°48′15″W
- Type: man-made lake
- Surface area: 135-acre (550,000 m^{2})
- Max. depth: 25 feet (7.6 m)

Shawnee State Fishing Lake is approximately 8 miles (13 km) northwest of Topeka, Kansas, and is in northern Shawnee County, Kansas. This lake is sometimes confused with Lake Shawnee, on the east side of Topeka. It is a 135-acre (550,000 m^{2}) surface area lake with a maximum depth of 25 feet (7.6 m). This is a manmade freshwater lake, which was constructed in the late 1960s. The lake is widest at the dam, which is at the south end of the lake. It can be reached by a number of roads. The only asphalted road reaching it is on the southeast corner. To the north is 94th Street and on the west side is Humphrey Road.

Shawnee State Fishing Lake allows boating and fishing. In fact, the lake's website states boats may be used on the lake only for fishing. A public boat ramp is located at the lake's southeast corner, just north of the dam. The lake is regularly stocked with catfish. Various other fishes are also in reasonable numbers in the lake. Thirteen rock jetties have been built into the lake to serve as fishing piers. A number of campsites have been established along the lake's shore. These are all considered primitive, meaning they have no electrical or water hookups. However, three public pit toilets are located on the lake shores.

Hunting by shotgun and archery is allowed on the property in December and January. No other weapons may be used for hunting. On the east side of the lake, the Shawnee County Hunter Education Facility and Shooting Range provides hunter education classes.
