= Delia, Kansas =

City in Jackson County, Kansas

- City
- Location within Jackson County and Kansas

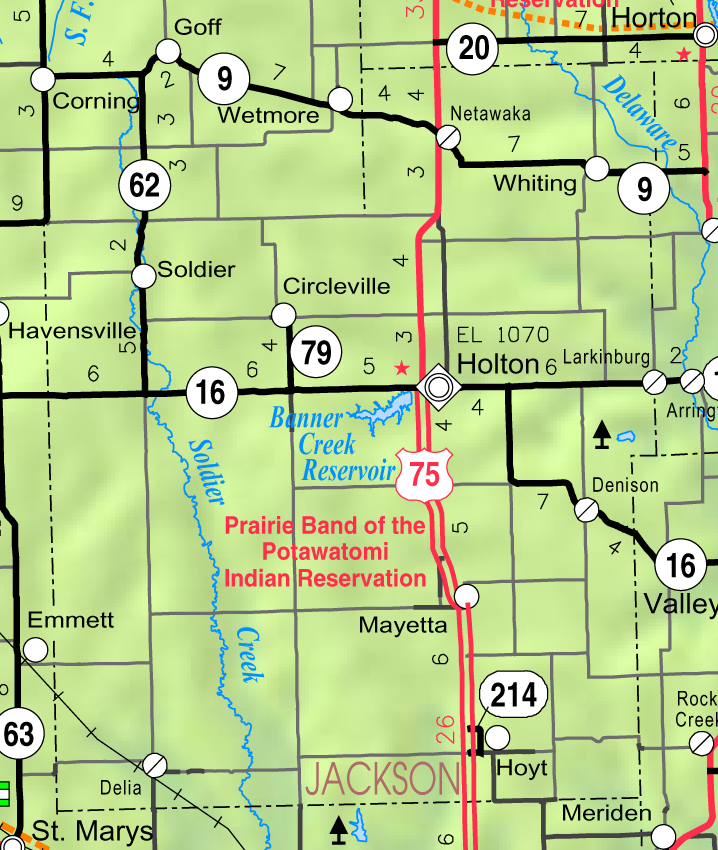
- KDOT map of Jackson County (legend)
- Coordinates: 39°14′22″N 95°57′54″W
- Country: United States
- State: Kansas
- County: Jackson
- Founded: 1905
- Platted: 1905
- Incorporated: 1918
- Named for: Delia Cunningham

Area
  - Total: 0.12 sq mi (0.30 km^{2})
  - Land: 0.12 sq mi (0.30 km^{2})
  - Water: 0 sq mi (0.00 km^{2})
- Elevation: 974 ft (297 m)

Population (2020)
  - Total: 151
  - Density: 1,300/sq mi (500/km^{2})
- Time zone: UTC-6 (CST)
  - Summer (DST): UTC-5 (CDT)
- ZIP Code: 66418
- Area code: 785
- FIPS code: 20-17525
- GNIS ID: 2394502

Delia is a city in Jackson County, Kansas, United States. As of the 2020 census, the population of the city was 151.

== History ==
Delia was laid out and platted in 1905. Its founder, David Cunningham, named the town in honor of his mother, Delia Cunningham.

The first post office in Delia was established in January 1906 and closed in November 2017.

== Geography ==
According to the United States Census Bureau, the city has a total area of 0.11 square miles (0.28 km^{2}), all land.

== Demographics ==
Historical population
Census	Pop.	Note	%±
1920	244		—
1930	269		10.2%
1940	222		−17.5%
1950	164		−26.1%
1960	163		−0.6%
1970	168		3.1%
1980	181		7.7%
1990	172		−5.0%
2000	179		4.1%
2010	169		−5.6%
2020	151		−10.7%
U.S. Decennial Census

Delia is part of the Topeka, Kansas Metropolitan Statistical Area.

=== 2020 census ===
The 2020 United States census counted 151 people, 59 households, and 44 families in Delia. The population density was 1,313.0 per square mile (507.0/km^{2}). There were 61 housing units at an average density of 530.4 per square mile (204.8/km^{2}). The racial makeup was 74.83% (113) white or European American (74.17% non-Hispanic white), 1.99% (3) black or African-American, 12.58% (19) Native American or Alaska Native, 0.0% (0) Asian, 0.0% (0) Pacific Islander or Native Hawaiian, 1.99% (3) from other races, and 8.61% (13) from two or more races. Hispanic or Latino of any race was 4.64% (7) of the population.

Of the 59 households, 35.6% had children under the age of 18; 59.3% were married couples living together; 13.6% had a female householder with no spouse or partner present. 18.6% of households consisted of individuals and 10.2% had someone living alone who was 65 years of age or older. The average household size was 2.2 and the average family size was 2.5. The percent of those with a bachelor's degree or higher was estimated to be 13.9% of the population.

26.5% of the population was under the age of 18, 7.9% from 18 to 24, 21.9% from 25 to 44, 23.8% from 45 to 64, and 19.9% who were 65 years of age or older. The median age was 37.8 years. For every 100 females, there were 93.6 males. For every 100 females ages 18 and older, there were 94.7 males.

The 2016–2020 5-year American Community Survey estimates show that the median household income was $61,250 (with a margin of error of +/- $27,243) and the median family income was $70,114 (+/- $18,354). Males had a median income of $40,962 (+/- $12,808) versus $30,833 (+/- $11,380) for females. The median income for those above 16 years old was $33,750 (+/- $13,951). Approximately, 6.5% of families and 13.2% of the population were below the poverty line, including 35.6% of those under the age of 18 and 7.2% of those ages 65 or over.

=== 2010 census ===
As of the census of 2010, there were 169 people, 52 households, and 40 families residing in the city. The population density was 1,536.4 inhabitants per square mile (593.2/km^{2}). There were 58 housing units at an average density of 527.3 per square mile (203.6/km^{2}). The racial makeup of the city was 85.8% White, 10.7% Native American, and 3.6% from two or more races. Hispanic or Latino of any race were 1.8% of the population.

There were 52 households, of which 48.1% had children under the age of 18 living with them, 65.4% were married couples living together, 5.8% had a female householder with no husband present, 5.8% had a male householder with no wife present, and 23.1% were non-families. 15.4% of all households were made up of individuals, and 7.7% had someone living alone who was 65 years of age or older. The average household size was 3.25 and the average family size was 3.68.

The median age in the city was 33.5 years. 30.8% of residents were under the age of 18; 7.7% were between the ages of 18 and 24; 26% were from 25 to 44; 26.6% were from 45 to 64; and 8.9% were 65 years of age or older. The gender makeup of the city was 46.2% male and 53.8% female.

=== 2000 census ===
As of the census of 2000, there were 179 people, 53 households, and 46 families residing in the city. The population density was 1,571.0 inhabitants per square mile (606.6/km^{2}). There were 58 housing units at an average density of 509.0 per square mile (196.5/km^{2}). The racial makeup of the city was 86.03% White, 12.85% Native American, and 1.12% from two or more races. Hispanic or Latino of any race were 0.56% of the population.

There were 53 households, out of which 47.2% had children under the age of 18 living with them, 73.6% were married couples living together, 7.5% had a female householder with no husband present, and 13.2% were non-families. 13.2% of all households were made up of individuals, and 5.7% had someone living alone who was 65 years of age or older. The average household size was 3.38 and the average family size was 3.72.

In the city, the population was spread out, with 38.5% under the age of 18, 6.7% from 18 to 24, 24.0% from 25 to 44, 20.1% from 45 to 64, and 10.6% who were 65 years of age or older. The median age was 30 years. For every 100 females, there were 113.1 males. For every 100 females age 18 and over, there were 103.7 males.

The median income for a household in the city was $36,667, and the median income for a family was $37,250. Males had a median income of $29,375 versus $43,750 for females. The per capita income for the city was $14,665. About 11.7% of families and 12.8% of the population and 11.7% of families were below the poverty line, including 17.1% of those under the age of 18 and 24.0% of those 65 and older.

== Education ==
The community is served by Kaw Valley USD 321 public school district.

== Notable people ==
- David Bawden, sedevacantist claimant to the papacy as "Pope Michael".
