= Deep Six (comics) =

Deep Six, in comics, may refer to:

- Deep Six (Marvel Comics), two Marvel Comics teams with the same name
- Deep Six (DC Comics), a DC Comics supervillain team
- Deep Six (G.I. Joe), a character from the G.I. Joe comic book series

== See also ==
- Deep Six (disambiguation)
