= Blacksmith (comics) =

Fictional character from American comic books published by Marvel Comics

Blacksmith is a fictional character appearing in American comic books published by Marvel Comics. The character first appeared in Moon Knight #16 (1981).

== Fictional character biography ==
Blacksmith was a prisoner who learned everything he could about Moon Knight, but when he escapes Moon Knight defeats him and he is sent back to prison.
