= Blacksmith Creek =

Stream in Shawnee County, Kansas, U.S.

Coordinates: 39.063889°N 95.841375°W

Blacksmith Creek is a stream in Shawnee County, Kansas, in the United States.

Blacksmith Creek was named from a blacksmith shop of the Kaw people.

== See also ==
- List of rivers of Kansas
