= Halfday Creek =

Stream in Kansas, U.S.

Coordinates: 39°06′11″N 95°41′50″W

Halfday Creek is a stream in Jackson County, Kansas and Shawnee County, Kansas, in the United States.

Halfday Creek was named for a Potawatomi chief.

== See also ==
- List of rivers of Kansas
