= Soldier Creek (Kansas River tributary) =

Stream in Kansas, U.S.

Coordinates: 39.076944°N 95.649425°W

Soldier Creek is a stream in Jackson County, Kansas and Shawnee County, Kansas and Nemaha County, Kansas, in the United States. It is a tributary of the Kansas River.

Soldier Creek was named from its frequent use as a camping site of soldiers passing from Fort Leavenworth to Fort Riley.

== See also ==
- List of rivers of Kansas
