= Lake Shawnee (Kansas) =

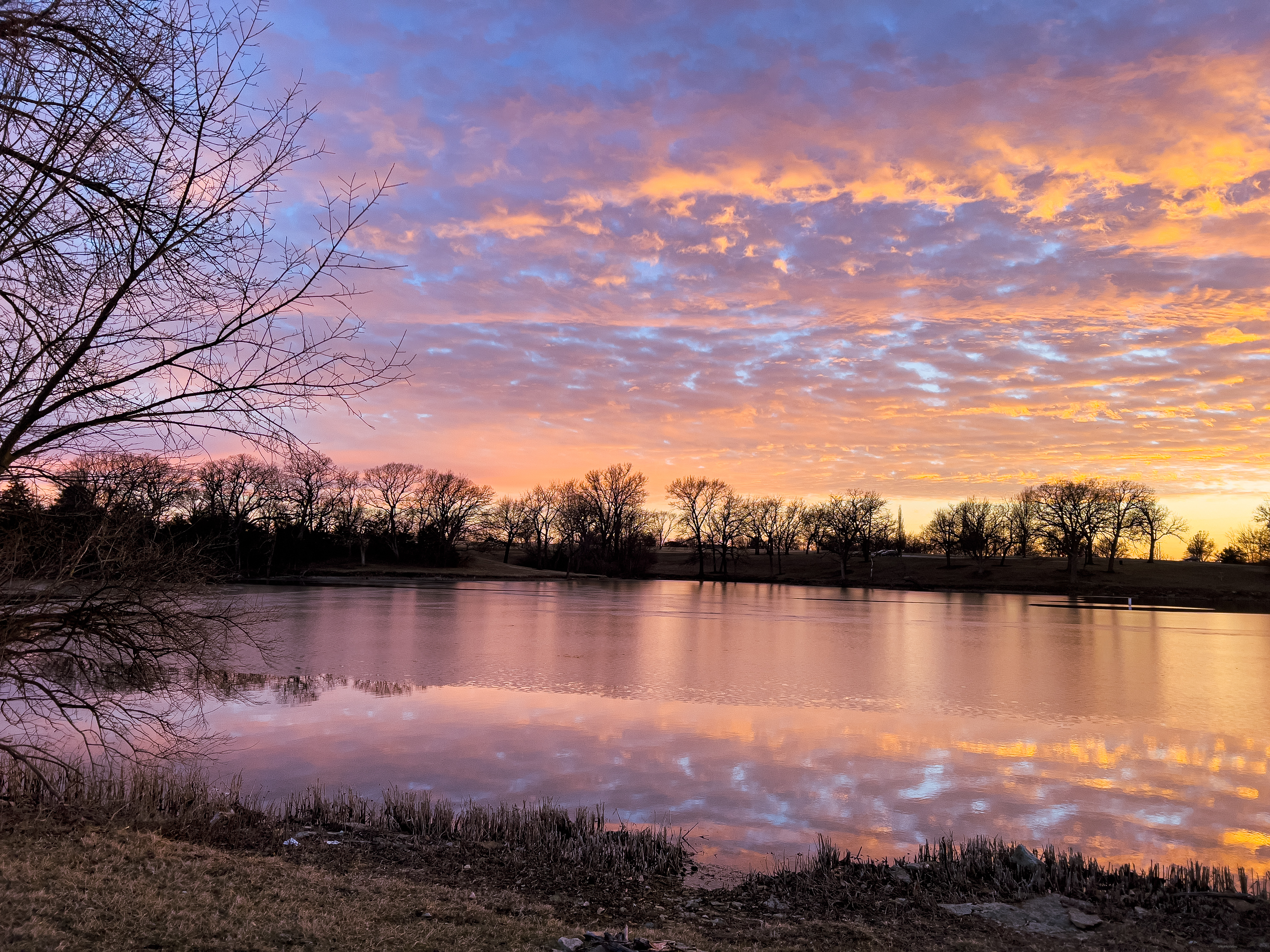
- Lake Shawnee, 2025
- Interactive map of Lake Shawnee
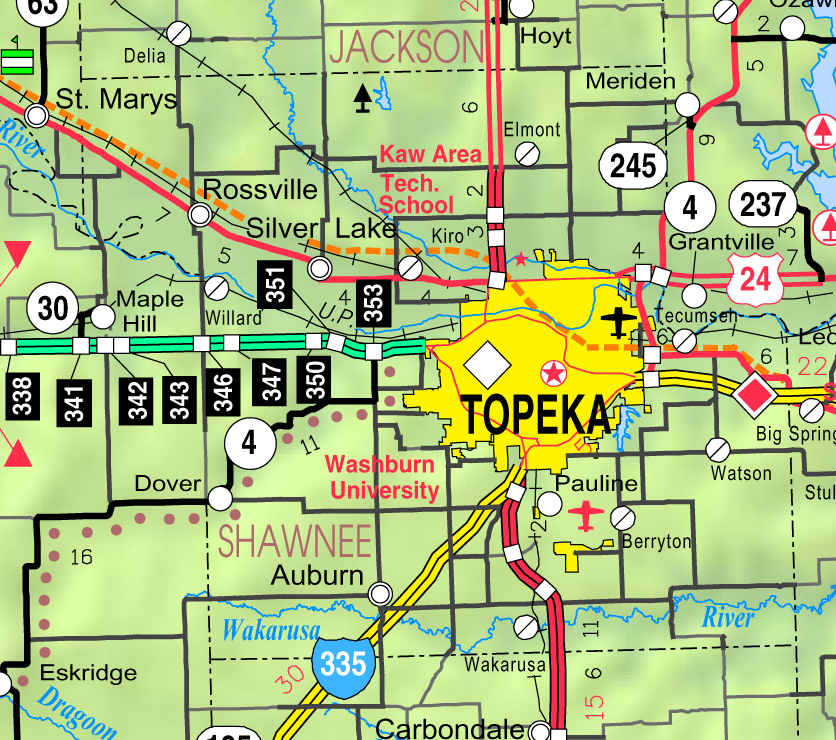
- KDOT map of Shawnee County (legend)
- Location: Shawnee County, Kansas
- Coordinates: 39°0′10″N 95°37′43″W
- Type: man-made lake
- Etymology: Shawnee County
- Built: 1935-1939
- Settlements: Topeka, Kansas

Lake Shawnee is a man-made lake in Shawnee County in the U.S. state of Kansas, located on the southeastern side of Topeka. The lake started construction in 1935, and finished on September 3, 1939, and was a part of a Works Progress Administration project. The lake's size is approximately 416 acres (1.68 km^{2}), and has a maximum depth of 52 feet (16 m). The lake is mostly used for recreational purposes, with it having a golf course, campgrounds, fishing docks, a garden, a swimming beach, a trail and more. The lake features fish such as walleyes, bluegills, crappies, trout, white bass, channel catfish, and black bass.

Shawnee County Parks and Recreation annually restocks trout into the lake in the fall.

The lake experiences vernal algae blooms.

== History ==
In 1935, Lake Shawnee was made as a Works Progress Administration project. Construction finished on September 3, 1939, and on the opening day, over 5,000 fishermen came to celebrate its opening.

== Recreation ==
Lake Shawnee and the surrounding area features many recreational activities. Lake Shawnee Campground is located in the east side of the lake. The campground contains 114 campsites. Bettis Family Sports Complex is located in the northeast side of the lake. The complex contains soccer fields, baseball fields, and a batting cage. There is another softball complex in the west side of the lake. On the southwest side of the lake, there are eight tennis courts and a volleyball field. There is a 18-hole golf course on the southeast side of the lake. There are 16 fishing docks around the lake, a heated fishing dock, and a separate family pond for beginner fisherman. The Lake Shawnee trail is a loop trail around the lake itself. The trail is 6.8 miles (10.94 km) long. The Lake Shawnee Adventure Cove is a beach on the east side of the lake. It contains an inflatable floating playground in the water, and offers canoes, kayaks, and other boats available to rent to swim around the lake.

The lake includes Ted Ensley Garden, a 37.5 acre garden with over 1,200 perennnials.

== See also ==
- List of lakes, reservoirs, and dams in Kansas
