= National Register of Historic Places listings in Shawnee County, Kansas =

Location of Shawnee County in Kansas

This is a list of the National Register of Historic Places listings in Shawnee County, Kansas.

This is intended to be a complete list of the properties and districts on the National Register of Historic Places in Shawnee County, Kansas, United States. The locations of National Register properties and districts for which the latitude and longitude coordinates are included below, may be seen in a map.

There are 110 properties and districts listed on the National Register in the county, including 1 National Historic Landmark. Another two properties were once listed but have been removed.

This National Park Service list is complete through NPS recent listings posted October 30, 2026.

== Current listings ==
	Name on the Register	Image	Date listed	Location	City or town	Description
1	2209 SW 29th / Dr. Karl & Jeanetta Lyle Menninger Education Center	2209 SW 29th / Dr. Karl & Jeanetta Lyle Menninger Education Center	March 26, 2020 (#100005120)	2209 SW 29th St. 39°00′54″N 95°42′19″W	Topeka	
2	Morton Albaugh House	Morton Albaugh House	April 28, 2004 (#04000366)	1331 SW. Harrison St. 39°02′31″N 95°40′53″W	Topeka	
3	Solomon A. Alt House	Solomon A. Alt House	March 23, 2005 (#05000202)	1335 SW. College Ave. 39°02′34″N 95°42′01″W	Topeka	
4	Anton-Woodring House	Anton-Woodring House	August 23, 1991 (#91001088)	1011 Cambridge Ave. 39°03′03″N 95°43′27″W	Topeka	
5	ATSF Motive Power Building	ATSF Motive Power Building	January 20, 2012 (#11001034)	1001 NE Atchison Ave. 39°03′23″N 95°39′27″W	Topeka	
6	Blacksmith Creek Bridge	Blacksmith Creek Bridge	March 10, 1983 (#83000441)	West of Topeka; 39°03′03″N 95°50′37″W	Topeka	
7	Bowker House	Bowker House	March 15, 2007 (#07000139)	1200 SE. Quincy; 39°02′33″N 95°40′30″W	Topeka	
8	Brown v. Board of Education National Historic Site	Brown v. Board of Education National Historic Site	October 26, 1992 (#01000156)	424 S. Kansas Ave. Suite 220; 39°03′15″N 95°40′20″W	Topeka	
9	Shannon Brown House	Shannon Brown House	May 19, 2022 (#100007707)	1321 Lakeside Dr. 39°02′29″N 95°43′11″W	Topeka	
10	Casson Building	Casson Building	September 14, 2018 (#100002972)	603 SW Topeka Blvd. 39°03′11″N 95°40′45″W	Topeka	
11	Cedar Crest	Cedar Crest	May 6, 1982 (#82002672)	Cedar Crest Rd. 39°03′56″N 95°44′44″W	Topeka	
12	Central Motor and Finance Corporation Building	Central Motor and Finance Corporation Building	February 19, 1982 (#82002673)	222 W. 7th St. 39°03′02″N 95°40′23″W	Topeka	
13	Central National Bank	Central National Bank	July 19, 1976 (#76000841)	701-703 Kansas Ave. 39°03′00″N 95°40′26″W	Topeka	Contributing site of the South Kansas Avenue Commercial Historic District.
14	Church of the Assumption and Rectory	Church of the Assumption and Rectory	July 2, 2008 (#08000607)	204 SW. 8th St. 39°02′57″N 95°40′34″W	Topeka	
15	Church of the Assumption Historic District	Church of the Assumption Historic District	July 7, 2015 (#15000384)	204 and 212 SW. 8th Ave. and 735 Jackson St. 39°03′00″N 95°40′34″W	Topeka	
16	Church of the Holy Name	Church of the Holy Name	January 20, 2012 (#11001035)	1110 SW 10th Ave. 39°02′59″N 95°41′25″W	Topeka	
17	College Avenue Historic District	College Avenue Historic District	April 18, 2007 (#07000321)	College Ave. between Huntoon St. and 17th St. 39°02′26″N 95°42′01″W	Topeka	
18	Columbian Building	Columbian Building	September 5, 1975 (#75000722)	112-114 W. 6th St. 39°03′08″N 95°40′26″W	Topeka	
19	Constitution Hall-Topeka	Constitution Hall-Topeka	July 15, 2008 (#08000669)	429 S. Kansas Ave. 39°03′15″N 95°40′20″W	Topeka	
20	Country Club Residential Historic District	Country Club Residential Historic District	August 11, 2022 (#100007279)	Roughly bounded by SW 24th St., SW Topeka Blvd., SW Merriam Ct., and SW Western Ave. 39°01′29″N 95°41′10″W	Topeka	
21	Crawford Building	Crawford Building	August 22, 1975 (#75000723)	501 Jackson St. 39°03′12″N 95°40′26″W	Topeka	
22	Nelson Antrim Crawford House	Nelson Antrim Crawford House	October 4, 2017 (#100001707)	2202 SW. 17th St. 39°02′13″N 95°42′18″W	Topeka	
23	William T. and Delora Crosby House	William T. and Delora Crosby House	October 6, 2011 (#11000729)	1109 SW Topeka Blvd. 39°02′45″N 95°40′58″W	Topeka	
24	Curtis Junior High School	Curtis Junior High School	October 22, 2001 (#01001126)	316 NW. Grant St. 39°04′26″N 95°40′00″W	Topeka	
25	Charles Curtis House	Charles Curtis House	January 25, 1973 (#73000778)	1101 Topeka Ave. 39°02′45″N 95°40′55″W	Topeka	
26	Davies Building	Davies Building	September 15, 1977 (#77000597)	725-727 Kansas Ave. 39°02′58″N 95°40′27″W	Topeka	Contributing site of the South Kansas Avenue Commercial Historic District.
27	Devon Apartments	Devon Apartments	June 27, 2002 (#02000683)	800-808 W. 12th St. 39°02′46″N 95°41′11″W	Topeka	
28	Dillon House	Dillon House	December 27, 2006 (#06001171)	404 W. 9th St. 39°02′55″N 95°40′46″W	Topeka	
29	East Topeka Junior High School	East Topeka Junior High School	January 14, 2004 (#03001397)	1210 E. 8th St. 39°02′42″N 95°39′36″W	Topeka	
30	England Farm	England Farm	May 7, 1982 (#82002674)	4619 SE. 37th St. 38°59′58″N 95°35′27″W	Topeka	
31	Evergreen Court Apartments	Evergreen Court Apartments	April 2, 2021 (#100006326)	3311-3321 SW 10th Ave. 39°03′04″N 95°43′10″W	Topeka	
32	Fire Station No. 1	Fire Station No. 1	December 28, 2020 (#100005955)	934 NE Quincy St. 39°04′06″N 95°39′52″W	Topeka	
33	Fire Station No. 2-Topeka	Fire Station No. 2-Topeka	July 3, 2002 (#02000715)	719-723 Van Buren; 39°03′07″N 95°40′35″W	Topeka	
34	Fire Station No. 4	Fire Station No. 4	September 30, 2019 (#100004450)	813 SW. Clay St. 39°03′07″N 95°41′21″W	Topeka	
35	Fire Station No. 6	Fire Station No. 6	October 5, 2020 (#100005631)	1419 NE Seward Ave. 39°03′32″N 95°39′03″W	Topeka	
36	Fire Station No. 7	Fire Station No. 7	June 1, 2020 (#100005119)	1215 SW Oakley Ave. 39°02′43″N 95°42′55″W	Topeka	
37	Fool Chief's Village		August 2, 2021 (#100006772)	Address Restricted	Menoken vicinity	
38	Swanson Gardner House	Swanson Gardner House	June 11, 2025 (#100011914)	207 Southwest Broadmoor Avenue; 39°03′41″N 95°41′30″W	Topeka	
39	Gem Building	Gem Building	November 1, 2006 (#06000964)	506-510 SW. 10th Ave. 39°02′58″N 95°40′54″W	Topeka	
40	Giles-Nellis House	Giles-Nellis House	April 28, 1992 (#92000432)	915 SW. Munson; 39°02′50″N 95°41′15″W	Topeka	Contributing site for the Holliday Park Historic District I.
41	Gordon Building	Gordon Building	October 20, 2010 (#10000846)	900, 902, and 904 S. Kansas Ave. 39°02′49″N 95°40′30″W	Topeka	Turn-of-the-20th-century classical revival furniture warehouse significant in Topeka's commercial history. Contributing site of the South Kansas Avenue Commercial Historic District.
42	HTK Architects Office Building	HTK Architects Office Building	June 1, 2021 (#100006580)	2900 SW MacVicar Ave. 39°00′53″N 95°42′22″W	Topeka	
43	Hard Chief's Village		June 22, 2007 (#07000610)	Southern side of the Kansas River, west of its confluence with Mission Creek; 39°04′24″N 95°51′40″W	Silver Lake	
44	John C. Harmon House	John C. Harmon House	January 20, 2012 (#11001036)	915 SW Buchanan; 39°03′04″N 95°41′30″W	Topeka	
45	Hicks Block	Hicks Block	November 9, 1977 (#77000598)	600 W. 6th Ave. 39°03′14″N 95°40′48″W	Topeka	
46	Holliday Park Historic District I	Holliday Park Historic District I	November 17, 2002 (#02001308)	Roughly bounded by 10th Ave. and Taylor, Polk, Huntoon, Clay and Fillmore Sts. 39°02′45″N 95°41′12″W	Topeka	
47	Holliday Park Historic District II	Holliday Park Historic District II	November 15, 2002 (#02001309)	1009, 1015, 1019,1021,1025, 1031, 1035 SW Fillmore St. 39°02′55″N 95°41′20″W	Topeka	
48	Hopkins House	Hopkins House	January 16, 2009 (#08001353)	6033 SE. U.S. Route 40; 39°02′39″N 95°33′23″W	Tecumseh	
49	House at 116 Southwest The Drive	House at 116 Southwest The Drive	October 5, 2020 (#100005633)	116 SW The Drive; 39°03′45″N 95°41′52″W	Topeka	
50	Hughes Conoco Service Station	Hughes Conoco Service Station	July 5, 2011 (#11000411)	400 SW. Taylor St. 39°03′25″N 95°40′54″W	Topeka	
51	Jayhawk Hotel, Theater and Walk	Jayhawk Hotel, Theater and Walk	March 11, 1982 (#82002675)	700 Jackson Ave. 39°03′01″N 95°40′29″W	Topeka	Contributing site of the South Kansas Avenue Commercial Historic District.
52	Kansas State Capitol	Kansas State Capitol	September 3, 1971 (#71000330)	Bounded by 8th and 10th Aves. and Jackson and Harrison Sts. 39°02′54″N 95°40′39″W	Topeka	
53	Hazen L. Kirkpatrick House	Hazen L. Kirkpatrick House	July 27, 2023 (#100009185)	1320 Pembroke Ln. 39°02′28″N 95°43′03″W	Topeka	
54	Charles and Dorothy Kouns House	Charles and Dorothy Kouns House	October 5, 2020 (#100005630)	1625 SW MacVicar Ave. 39°02′15″N 95°42′22″W	Topeka	
55	Lane Street Church of God	Lane Street Church of God	December 19, 2025 (#100012447)	1200 Southwest Lane Street; 39°02′45″N 95°41′43″W	Topeka	
56	James and Freda Lippitt House	James and Freda Lippitt House	October 5, 2020 (#100005634)	2532 SW Granthurst Ave. 39°01′27″N 95°41′10″W	Topeka	
57	Fred and Cora Luttjohann House	Fred and Cora Luttjohann House	February 20, 2004 (#03001384)	2053 S. Kansas Ave. 39°01′53″N 95°40′45″W	Topeka	
58	Horace G. Lyons House	Horace G. Lyons House	August 1, 1984 (#84001241)	4831 SE. 61st St. 38°57′21″N 95°35′02″W	Berryton	
59	Masonic Grand Lodge Building	Masonic Grand Lodge Building	October 8, 2014 (#14000833)	320 SW. 8th Ave. 39°03′00″N 95°40′42″W	Topeka	
60	McCauley Bridge	McCauley Bridge	July 2, 1985 (#85001427)	0.5 miles south of Auburn; 38°53′49″N 95°48′53″W	Auburn	
61	Memorial Building	Memorial Building	July 17, 1975 (#75000724)	120 W. 10th Ave. 39°02′47″N 95°40′34″W	Topeka	Contributing site of the South Kansas Avenue Commercial Historic District.
62	Menninger Clinic Building	Menninger Clinic Building	February 13, 1975 (#75000725)	3535 W. 6th Ave. 39°03′30″N 95°43′14″W	Topeka	
63	Mill Block Historic District	Mill Block Historic District	July 7, 2015 (#15000385)	101-129 N. Kansas Ave. 39°03′34″N 95°40′14″W	Topeka	International Harvester Building at 109 N Kansas Ave was destroyed by fire on May 29, 2019.
64	Morgan House	Morgan House	April 28, 2004 (#04000367)	1335 SW. Harrison St. 39°02′30″N 95°40′53″W	Topeka	
65	Mount Auburn Cemetery	Mount Auburn Cemetery	January 13, 2025 (#100011285)	916 Southeast California Avenue; 39°02′23″N 95°39′03″W	Topeka	
66	Mowers House		November 5, 2026 (#100013586)	1521 Southwest Stratford Road; 39°02′25″N 95°43′17″W	Topeka	
67	North Topeka Baptist Church	North Topeka Baptist Church	January 18, 2011 (#10001137)	123 NW Gordon. 39°04′09″N 95°39′59″W	Topeka	
68	Old German-American State Bank	Old German-American State Bank	April 30, 1980 (#80001475)	435 Kansas Ave. 39°03′12″N 95°40′22″W	Topeka	
69	Park Plaza Apartments	Park Plaza Apartments	June 1, 2021 (#100006579)	1275 SW Fillmore St. 39°02′34″N 95°41′22″W	Topeka	
70	Pottawatomie Baptist Mission Building	Pottawatomie Baptist Mission Building	September 3, 1971 (#71001089)	Off W. 6th St., 0.5 mile west of Wanamaker Rd.; also on Urish Rd., 0.3 miles north of 10th St. 39°03′21″N 95°46′31″W	Topeka	Urish Road location represents a boundary increase
71	Potwin Place Historic District	Potwin Place Historic District	May 1, 1980 (#80001476)	Roughly bounded by Elmwood, Grove, Broadmoor, and Willow Sts. 39°03′43″N 95°41′38″W	Topeka	
72	Ritchie Cemetery	Ritchie Cemetery	January 4, 2023 (#100008523)	1900-1948 SW 27th St. 39°01′21″N 95°42′08″W	Topeka	
73	John and Mary Ritchie House	John and Mary Ritchie House	December 29, 2015 (#15000939)	1116 SE. Madison St. 39°02′34″N 95°40′21″W	Topeka	
74	Ross Row Houses	Ross Row Houses	November 5, 1998 (#98001329)	513, 515, 517, 517½, 519, and 521 Van Buren St. 39°03′12″N 95°40′34″W	Topeka	
75	Sage Inn	Sage Inn	October 8, 1976 (#76000840)	57th St. and Douglas Rd. 38°57′53″N 95°56′17″W	Dover	
76	St. John African Methodist Episcopal Church	St. John African Methodist Episcopal Church	August 16, 2008 (#08000987)	701 SW. Topeka Boulevard; 39°03′06″N 95°40′47″W	Topeka	
77	St. John's Lutheran School	St. John's Lutheran School	January 3, 1985 (#85000014)	315 W. 4th St. 39°03′19″N 95°40′32″W	Topeka	
78	St. Joseph's Catholic Church	St. Joseph's Catholic Church	February 24, 1971 (#71000331)	235 Van Buren St. 39°03′24″N 95°40′29″W	Topeka	
79	St. Joseph's School-St. Joseph's Convent	St. Joseph's School-St. Joseph's Convent	March 14, 2019 (#100003441)	304-308 SW Van Buren St. 39°03′23″N 95°40′28″W	Topeka	
80	St. Mark's African Methodist Episcopal Church	St. Mark's African Methodist Episcopal Church	March 14, 2019 (#100004451)	801 NW. Harrison Ave. 39°04′04″N 95°40′16″W	Topeka	
81	Santa Fe Hospital	Santa Fe Hospital	October 11, 2016 (#16000708)	600 SE Madison St. 39°03′01″N 95°40′09″W	Topeka	
82	John Sargent House	John Sargent House	July 28, 1995 (#95000930)	225 SW. Clay St. 39°03′38″N 95°41′08″W	Topeka	
83	Second Missionary Baptist Church	Second Missionary Baptist Church	January 14, 2025 (#100011286)	416 and 424 NW Laurent Street; 39°04′09″N 95°40′18″W	Topeka	
84	Security Benefit Association Hospital Building	Security Benefit Association Hospital Building	November 30, 2005 (#05001341)	5800 SW. 6th, 5 miles northwest on private road 39°03′45″N 95°45′27″W	Topeka	
85	Senate and Curtis Court Apartments Historic District	Senate and Curtis Court Apartments Historic District	December 29, 2015 (#15000940)	900-914 SW. Tyler St. 39°02′56″N 95°40′57″W	Topeka	
86	Shiloh Baptist Church	Shiloh Baptist Church	June 29, 2018 (#100002629)	1201 SW Buchanan St. 39°02′45″N 95°41′33″W	Topeka	
87	J.A. Shoemaker House	J.A. Shoemaker House	January 22, 2009 (#08001354)	1434 SW. Plass Ave. 39°02′27″N 95°42′17″W	Topeka	
88	South Kansas Avenue Commercial Historic District	South Kansas Avenue Commercial Historic District	July 7, 2015 (#15000386)	Roughly bounded by 6th and 10th Aves. and SW. Jackson and SE. Quincy Sts. 39°02′56″N 95°40′29″W	Topeka	
89	Sumner Elementary School and Monroe Elementary School	Sumner Elementary School and Monroe Elementary School	May 4, 1987 (#87001283)	330 Western Ave. and 1515 Monroe St. 39°03′29″N 95°40′56″W	Topeka	
90	Thacher Building	Thacher Building	March 31, 1975 (#75000726)	110 E. 8th St. 39°02′56″N 95°40′24″W	Topeka	Contributing site of the South Kansas Avenue Commercial Historic District
91	Thomas Arch Bridge	Thomas Arch Bridge	May 10, 1990 (#90000746)	Junction of Wanamaker Rd. and 105th St. across the Wakarusa River; 38°52′30″N 95°45′41″W	Auburn	
92	Lucinda and Alvin Todd House	Lucinda and Alvin Todd House	April 1, 2025 (#100011628)	1007 SW Jewell Avenue; 39°03′04″N 95°42′10″W	Topeka	
93	Topeka Cemetery Historic District	Topeka Cemetery Historic District	April 25, 2001 (#01000409)	1601 E. 10th St. 39°02′30″N 95°39′17″W	Topeka	Boundary increase and renaming October 4, 2017.
94	Topeka Council of Colored Women's Clubs Building	Topeka Council of Colored Women's Clubs Building	December 30, 2009 (#09001169)	1149 SW. Lincoln; 39°02′51″N 95°41′38″W	Topeka	
95	Topeka High School	Topeka High School	June 9, 2005 (#05000550)	800 SW. 10th Ave. 39°03′03″N 95°41′08″W	Topeka	
96	Topeka Veterans Administration Hospital	Topeka Veterans Administration Hospital	March 7, 2019 (#100003485)	2200 SW Gage Blvd. 39°01′35″N 95°43′25″W	Topeka	
97	Union Church Building	Union Church Building	January 5, 2024 (#100009708)	760 North Washington Street; 38°54′21″N 95°48′59″W	Auburn	
98	Union Pacific Railroad Passenger Depot	Union Pacific Railroad Passenger Depot	October 1, 2002 (#02000492)	701 N. Kansas Ave. 39°03′58″N 95°40′10″W	Topeka	
99	Uniontown Cemetery	Uniontown Cemetery	May 17, 2010 (#10000263)	NW Douglas Rd. 39°05′05″N 95°56′15″W	Willard	
100	United States Post Office and Court House	United States Post Office and Court House	March 3, 2015 (#15000046)	424 S. Kansas Ave. 39°03′13″N 95°40′21″W	Topeka	
101	Tinkham Veale Building	Tinkham Veale Building	January 11, 2006 (#05001511)	909-911 S. Kansas Ave. 39°02′49″N 95°40′32″W	Topeka	Contributing site of the South Kansas Avenue Commercial Historic District
102	Wakarusa Hotel	Wakarusa Hotel	April 26, 1979 (#79000955)	Main St. 38°53′05″N 95°41′46″W	Wakarusa	
103	Ward-Meade House	Ward-Meade House	November 12, 1975 (#75000727)	124 N. Fillmore; 39°03′49″N 95°40′54″W	Topeka	
104	Warring House		June 22, 2026 (#100013135)	1215 Southwest 11th Avenue; 39°02′56″N 95°41′34″W	Topeka	
105	Washburn University Carnegie Library Building	Washburn University Carnegie Library Building	June 25, 1987 (#87000972)	Off 17th St. and Washburn Ave. 39°02′08″N 95°42′03″W	Topeka	
106	Wea Creek Bowstring Arch Truss Bridge	Wea Creek Bowstring Arch Truss Bridge	May 9, 2003 (#03000363)	Grounds of the Kansas State Historical Society, 6425 SE. 6th Ave. 39°03′21″N 95°46′40″W	Topeka	
107	Westminster Presbyterian Church	Westminster Presbyterian Church	May 19, 2004 (#04000453)	1275 Boswell Ave. 39°02′37″N 95°42′08″W	Topeka	
108	Willits House	Willits House	June 2, 1997 (#97000463)	1035 SW. Fillmore; 39°02′53″N 95°41′27″W	Topeka	Contributing site of the Holliday Park Historic District II.
109	Woman's Club Building	Woman's Club Building	February 19, 1982 (#82002676)	420 W. 9th St. 39°02′45″N 95°40′32″W	Topeka	
110	Chester B. Woodward House	Chester B. Woodward House	June 25, 1992 (#92000817)	1272 SW. Fillmore St. 39°02′36″N 95°41′17″W	Topeka	

== Former listings ==
	Name on the Register	Image	Date listed	Date removed	Location	City or town	Description
1	Grand Opera House		November 28, 1980 (#80001474)	April 3, 1986	615 Jackson St.	Topeka	
2	Kansas State Office Building	Kansas State Office Building	January 20, 2022 (#100007341)	January 8, 2024	915 SW Harrison Street; 39°02′52″N 95°40′47″W	Topeka	

== See also ==
- List of National Historic Landmarks in Kansas
- National Register of Historic Places listings in Kansas
