= Walter C. Root =

American architect

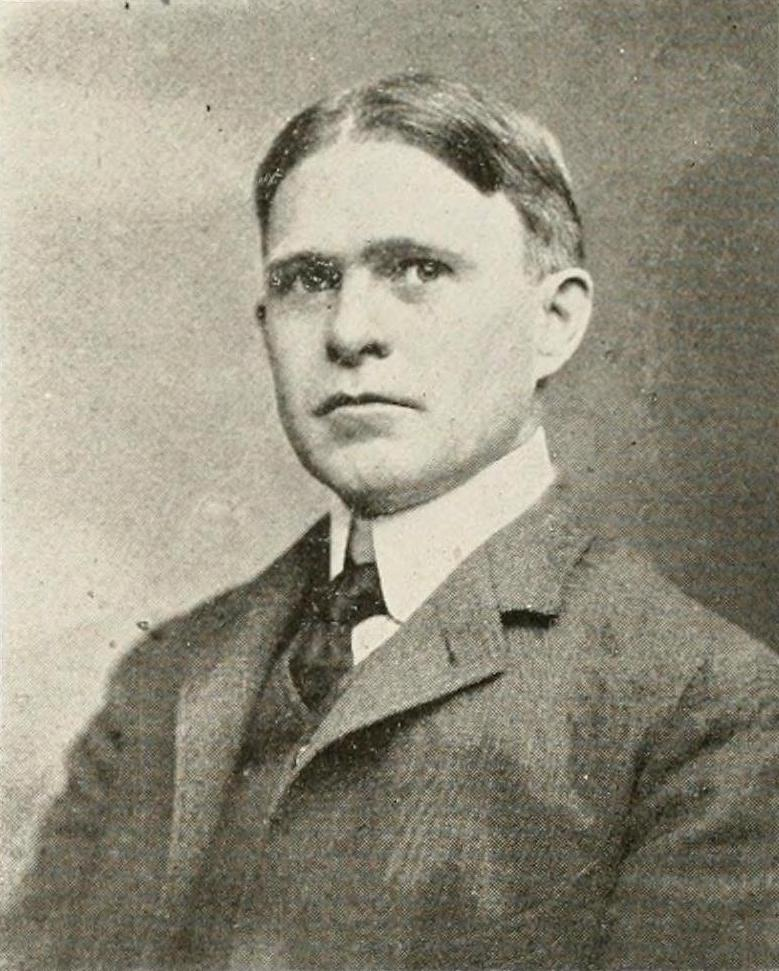
- Root, ca. 1902
- Born: December 8, 1859; Atlanta, Georgia
- Died: June 26, 1926 (aged 66); Kansas City, Missouri
- Occupation: Architect

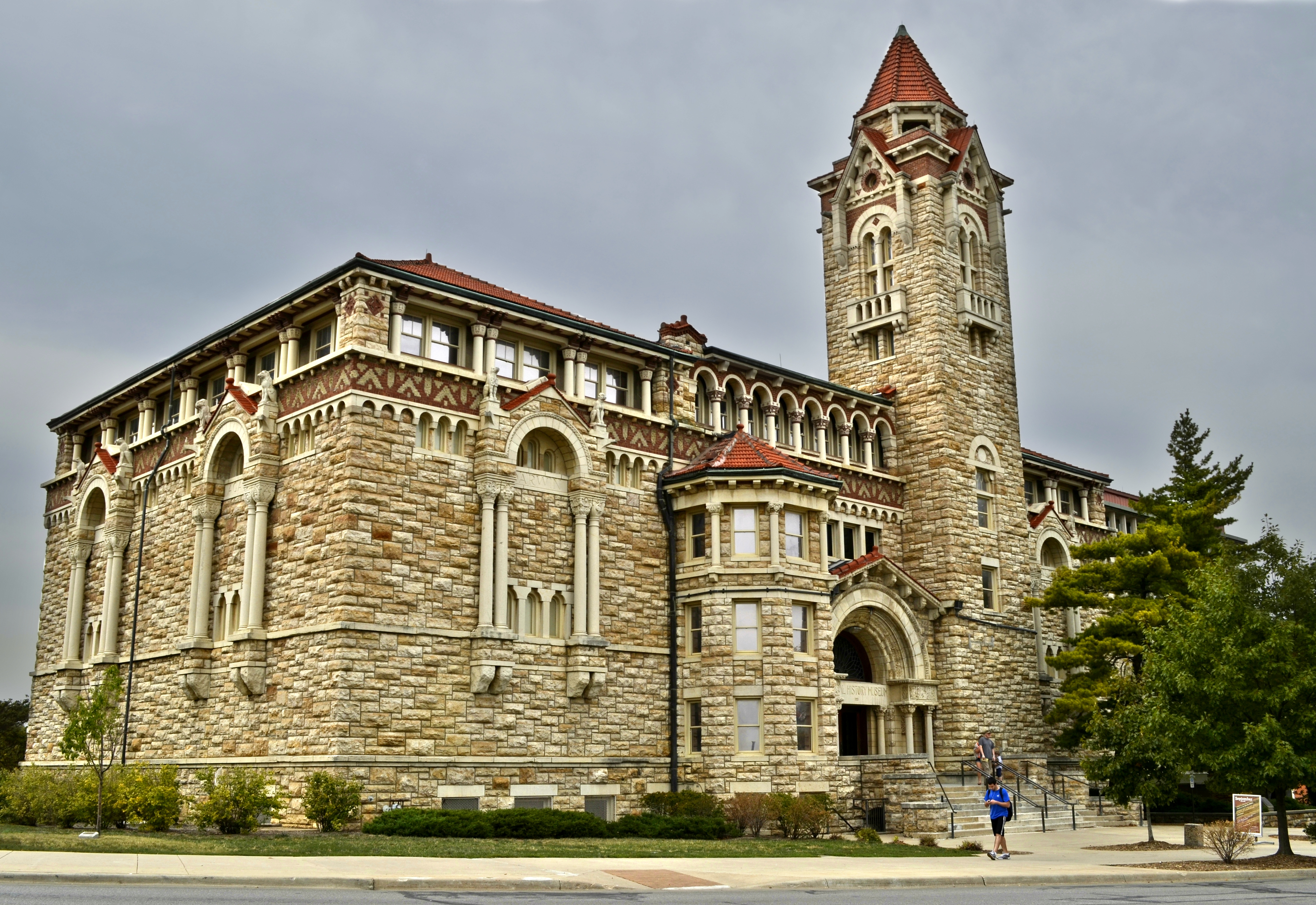
Dyche Hall, home to the University of Kansas Natural History Museum, designed by Root & Siemens; and completed 1901

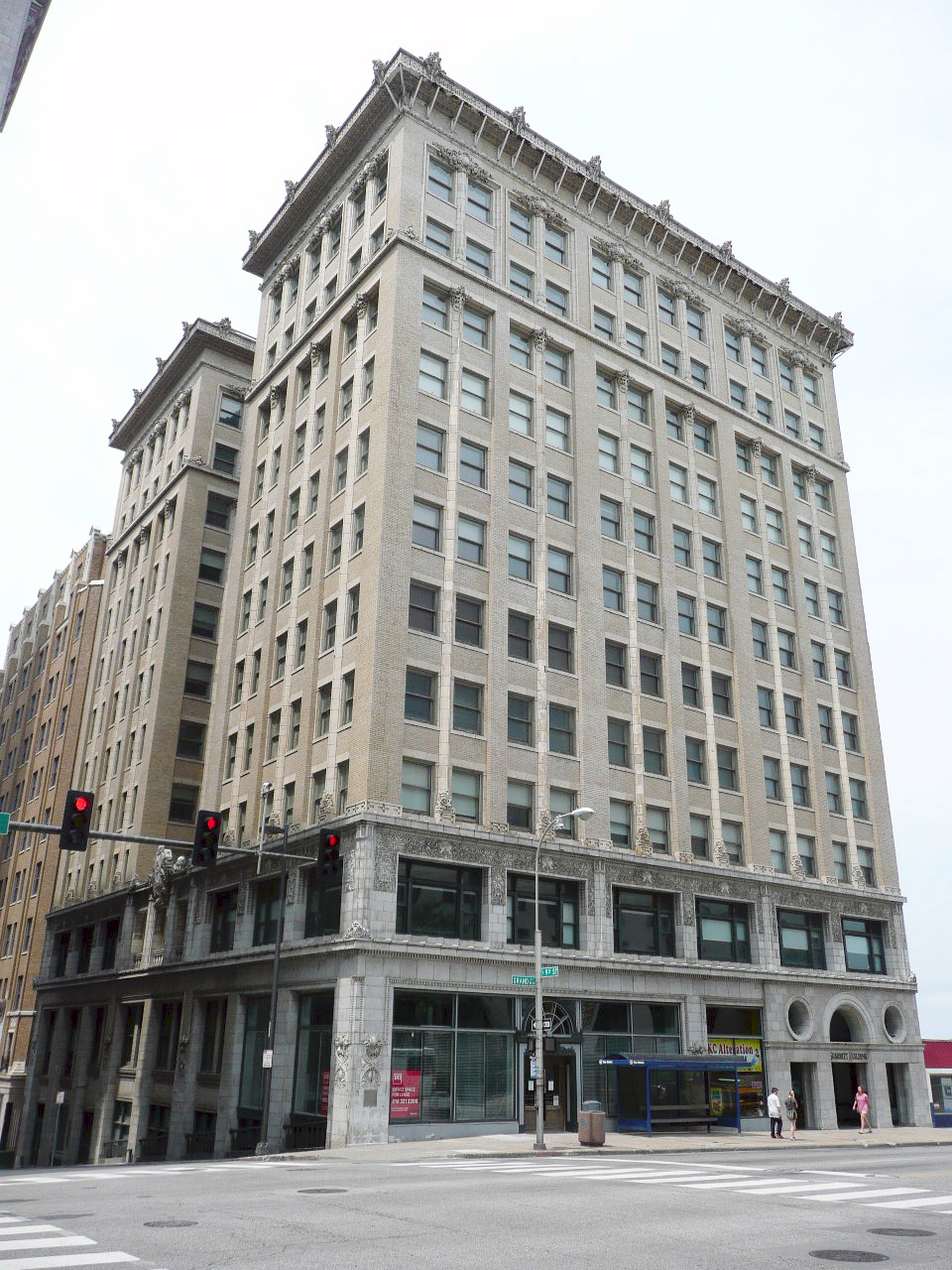
The Scarritt Building and Arcade in Kansas City, completed 1907

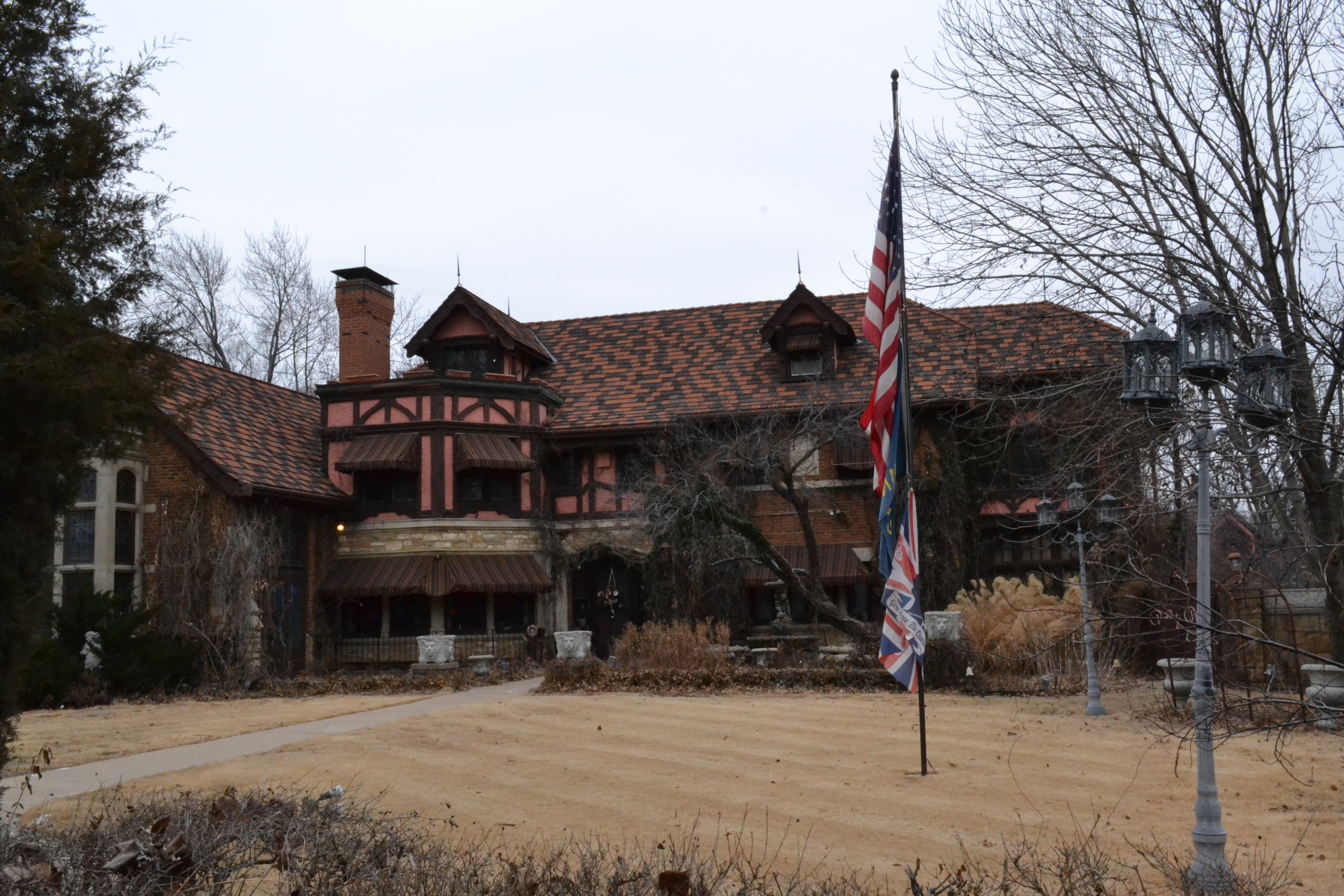
The Chester B. Woodward house in Topeka, completed 1923

Walter Clarke Root (December 8, 1859 – June 26, 1926) was an American architect who practiced in Kansas City, Missouri. He is best known for his major works in Missouri and Kansas, including Dyche Hall on the University of Kansas campus.

== Early life and career ==
Root was born on December 8, 1859, in Atlanta to Sidney Root, a merchant, and Mary Root (née Clarke). He had two siblings including his older brother, John Wellborn Root. During the American Civil War Sidney Root supported secession. Root's role in aiding the confederacy severely damaged his property interests, and after the war the family relocated to New York City, where Walter Clarke was educated. He attended the New York public schools and the City College of New York. In 1879 he moved to Chicago and joined his brother's office, Burnham & Root. In 1886 he was sent to Kansas City to supervise several of their large projects, including the Kansas City Board of Trade building, and when they were completed he opened his own office. After about eight years of independent practice Root formed the firm of Root & Siemens with architect George M. Siemens in 1896. They worked in partnership for almost thirty years.

He designed many buildings including the Francis and Harriet Baker House, a historic site listed on the National Register of Historic Places. With George M. Siemens, he designed Dyche Hall at University of Kansas, now the University of Kansas Natural History Museum and the Scarritt Building in Kansas City, Missouri.

== Personal life and death ==
Root was married in 1891 to Lora Bullene; they had three children. Root died suddenly in Kansas City on June 26, 1926.

== Works ==
Works include:

- Washington and Georgetown Railroad Car House (1891), 770 M St. SE, Washington, D.C., NRHP-listed
- Cass County Courthouse (1895–97), in NRHP-listed Harrisonville Courthouse Square Historic District, in Harrisonville, Missouri This is the only courthouse designed by Root in Missouri

Works credited to Root & Siemens include:

- University of Kansas Natural History Museum (1901), Lawrence, Kansas (with George M. Siemens), NRHP-listed as Dyche Hall, University of Kansas
- Francis and Harriet Baker House (1902), Atchison, Kansas, NRHP-listed
- Scarritt Building and Arcade (1906–07), Kansas City, Missouri (with George M. Siemens), NRHP-listed
- Unitarian Church of Urbana (1908), 1209 W. Oregon St., Urbana, Illinois, (perhaps in conjunction with C.F.Smith), NRHP-listed
- Grace Episcopal Cathedral (1909–16), 701 SW 8th Ave, Topeka, Kansas
- R. Bryson Jones House (1910), 1045 W. 56th St., Kansas City, Missouri, NRHP-listed
- George B. Peck Dry Goods Company Building (1914), 1044 Main St., Kansas City, Missouri, NRHP-listed
- Chester B. Woodward House (1923), 1272 SW. Fillmore St., Topeka, Kansas, NRHP-listed
