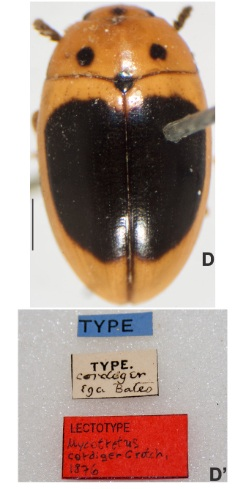

Scientific classification
- Kingdom: Animalia
- Phylum: Arthropoda
- Clade: Pancrustacea
- Class: Insecta
- Order: Coleoptera
- Suborder: Polyphaga
- Infraorder: Cucujiformia
- Family: Erotylidae
- Genus: Mycotretus
- Species: M. cordiger

Binomial name
- Mycotretus cordiger Crotch, 1876

Synonyms
- Mycotretus zischkai Delkeskamp, 1957

= Mycotretus cordiger =

Species of beetle

Mycotretus cordiger is a species of beetle of the Erotylidae family. This species is found in northern Brazil and Bolivia.

In addition, there is material of this species from Peru in the SEMC.
