= Horace G. Lyons House =

Historic house in Kansas, United States

- U.S. National Register of Historic Places
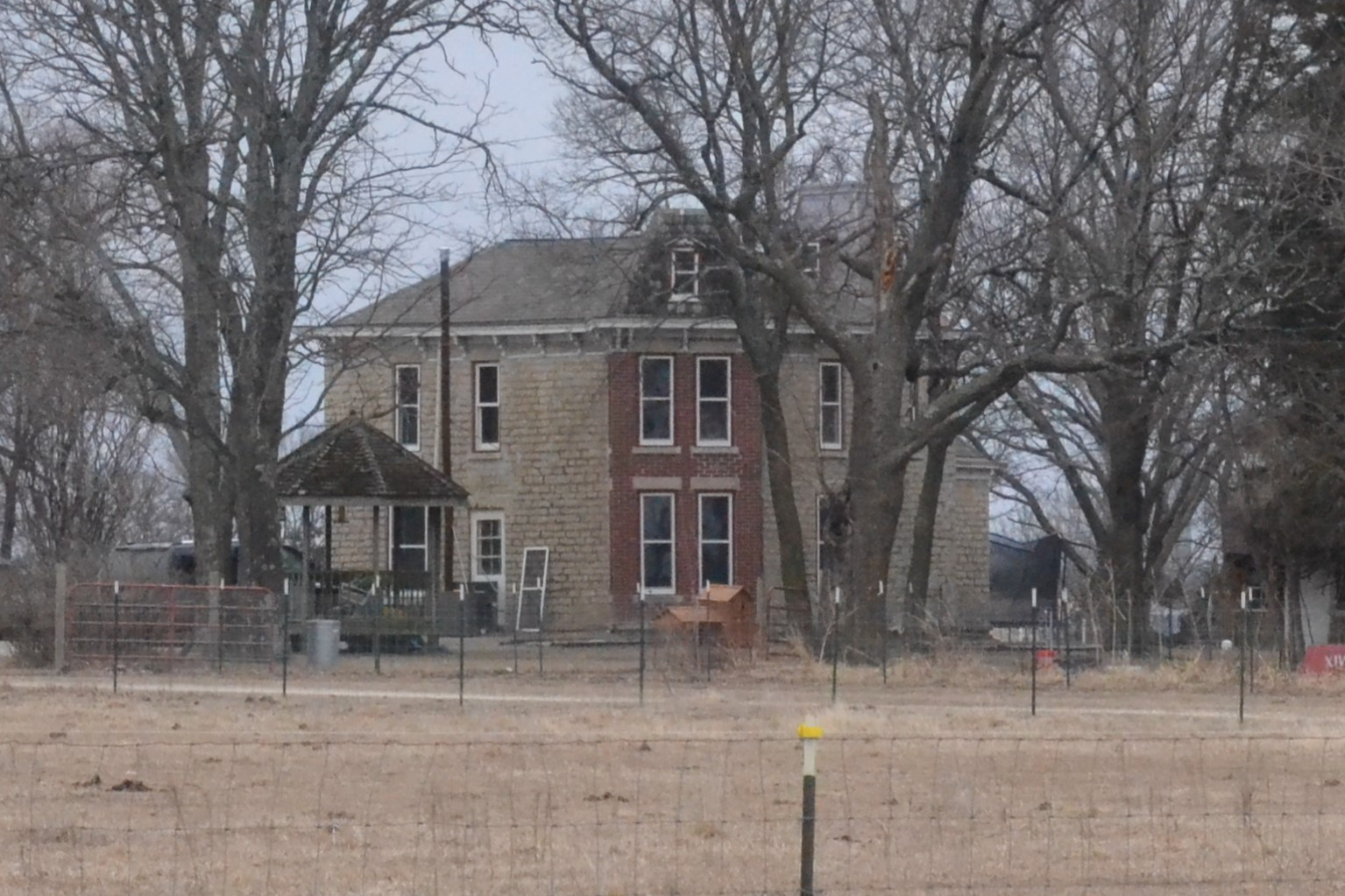
- The Horace G. Lyons House in 2018

- Location within Kansas
- Nearest city: Berryton, Kansas
- Coordinates: 38°57′21″N 95°35′02″W
- Area: 3 acres (1.2 ha)
- Built: 1860
- Architectural style: Second Empire, Italianate
- NRHP reference No.: 84001241
- Added to NRHP: August 1, 1984

The Horace G. Lyons House is a historic house. It was built in 1860 for Horace G. Lyons, a settler and farmer. It was expanded in 1893. In 1900, Lyons authored a religious booklet called The Devil Problem, in which he argued that the devil could be found in every man. The house remained in the Lyons family until 1977.

The house was designed in the Second Empire and Italianate architectural styles. It has been listed on the National Register of Historic Places since August 1, 1984.
