= Family Center Farm and Home =

Retail chain in the United States

Family Center Farm & Home
- Type: Private
- Industry: Retail
- Founded: 1965
- Headquarters: Harrisonville, Missouri
- Number of locations: 7
- Website: www.fcfarmandhome.com

Family Center Farm & Home is a retail chain with seven stores in Missouri and Kansas. The company is based in Harrisonville, Missouri. Its stores sell farm and garden equipment, animal feed, hardware, clothing, housewares, and food items.

== History ==
The company opened its first store in Harrisonville, Missouri in 1965. The original business was called Tractor Parts and Farm Supply. It was founded by Vernon and Kay Walker and later expanded to additional locations in Butler, Missouri; St. Joseph, Missouri; Ozark, Missouri; Rolla, Missouri; Sedalia, Missouri; and Paola, Kansas. A 2020 article about the Sedalia, Missouri store opening described the business as family-owned and quoted corporate manager Blake Mills as saying he co-owns the business with his father and brother, and that it was started by his grandfather, Vernon Walker, in 1965.
