= Channing-Murray Foundation =

- Unitarian Church of Urbana
- U.S. National Register of Historic Places
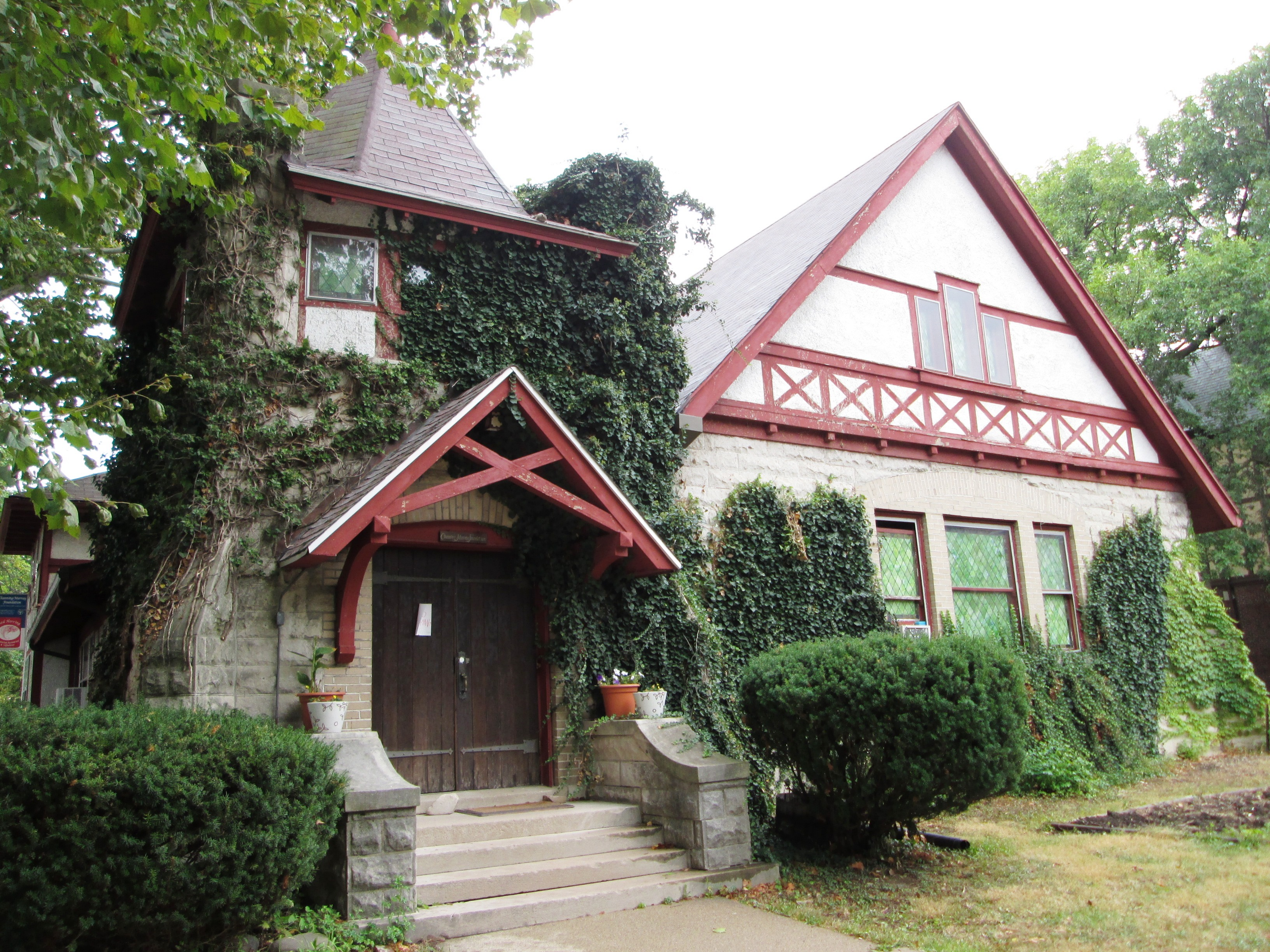
- (2013)

- Location within Illinois Location within the United States
- Location: 1209 W. Oregon St. Urbana, Illinois
- Coordinates: 40°6′24″N 88°13′30″W
- Built: 1908
- Architect: Root & Siemens; C.F. Smith
- Architectural style: Bungalow/Craftsman; Gothic Revival; Tudor Revival
- NRHP reference No.: 91000572
- Added to NRHP: May 13, 1991

The Channing-Murray Foundation, resides in the former Unitarian Church at 1209 West Oregon Street in Urbana, Illinois. It is the Unitarian Universalist campus ministry at the University of Illinois at Urbana-Champaign. It includes a chapel and a vegetarian restaurant, Red Herring. The Foundation was established in 1954 after a merger between the Unitarian and Universalist churches in Urbana. At the time, it was also as a merger of the Murray Club of the Universalist Church in Urbana, and the Young People's Club or Unity Club of the Unitarian Church. The building was constructed in 1908 as the Unitarian Church

The Unitarian Church of Urbana building is architecturally significant, with design by Root & Siemens, and was added to the National Register of Historic Places in 1991.

== See also ==
- National Register of Historic Places listings in Champaign County, Illinois
