= Harrisonville Courthouse Square Historic District =

Historic district in Missouri, United States

- U.S. National Register of Historic Places
- U.S. Historic district
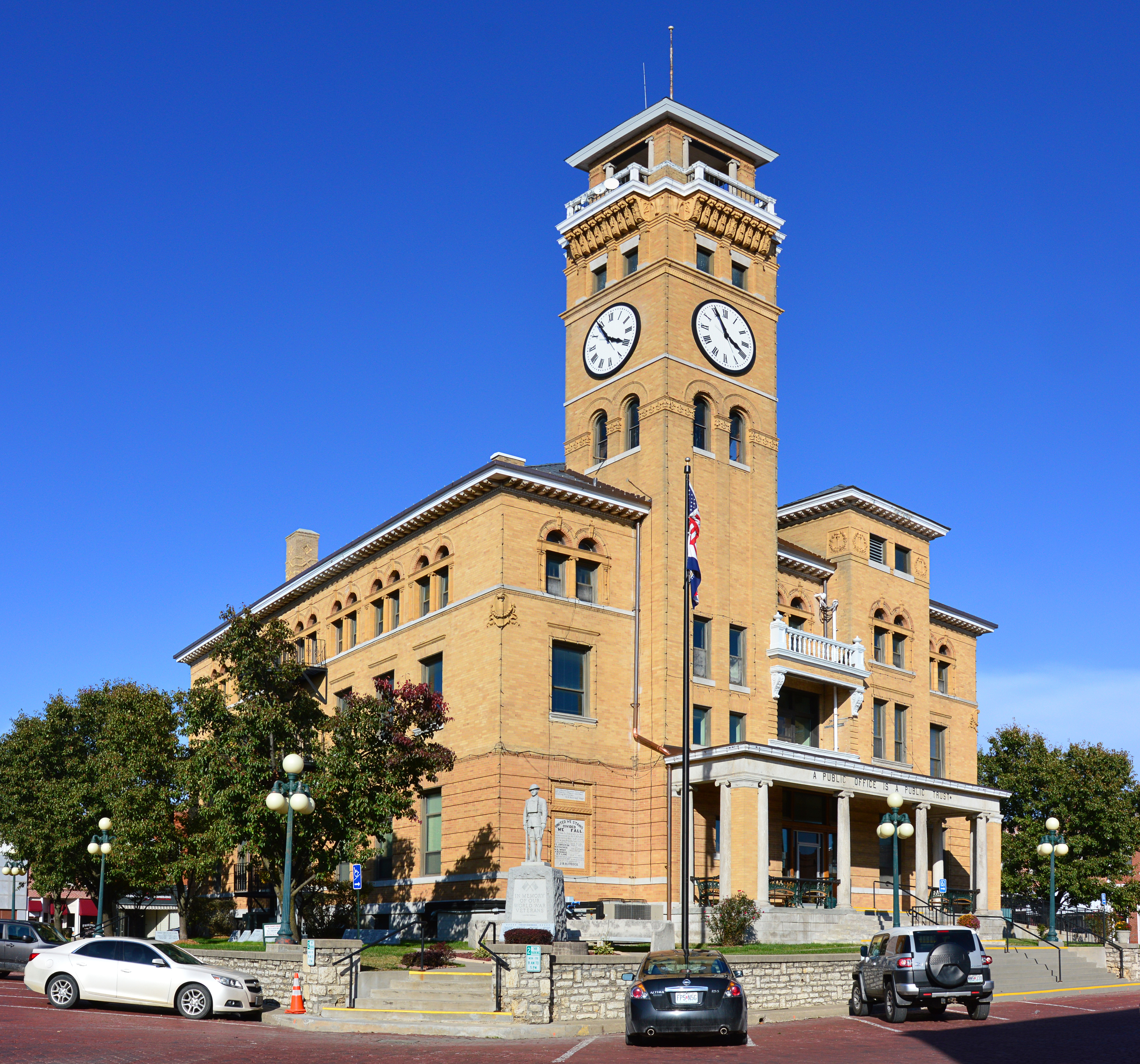
- The courthouse is the centerpiece of the district

- Location within Missouri Location within the United States
- Location: Roughly, Courthouse Sq. and adjacent side streets, Harrisonville, Missouri
- Coordinates: 38°39′16″N 94°20′55″W
- Area: 10.6 acres (4.3 ha)
- Architect: Root, Walter C.; Wetmore, James A.
- Architectural style: Multiple
- NRHP reference No.: 94000315
- Added to NRHP: April 8, 1994

Harrisonville Courthouse Square Historic District is a national historic district located at Harrisonville, Cass County, Missouri. The district includes 34 contributing buildings, 1 contributing structure, and 1 contributing object in the central business district of Harrisonville. It developed between about 1880 and 1943, and includes representative examples of Italianate, Queen Anne, Colonial Revival, Tudor Revival, and Renaissance Revival style architecture. Notable buildings include the Cass County Courthouse (1897), New Method Laundry (1929), Cass County Democrat (c. 1901), Wooldridge Building (before 1885), Bank of Harrisonville (1900-1901), Wirt's Opera House Building (1907; 1940-alterations), Post Office Building (1925), Emmons Building/Bowman Building (1887), Evans Building (1890), White Motor Company (c. 1930-1934), Stephen Stuart "Racket" Store (c. 1903-1908), First National Bank of Harrisonville (c. 1886-1891; c. 1920, 1980s alterations), and Deacon Building (1892).

It was listed on the National Register of Historic Places in 1994.

The Cass County Courthouse was designed in 1895 by Kansas City, Missouri, architect Walter C. Root. It was completed in 1897.
