= St. Peter's Episcopal Church (Harrisonville, Missouri) =

Historic church in Missouri, United States

- U.S. National Register of Historic Places
- Location within Missouri Location within the United States
- Location: 400 W. Wall St., Harrisonville, Missouri
- Coordinates: 38.654525°N 94.351059°W
- Area: less than one acre
- Built: 1895
- Architect: Arthur Jones
- Architectural style: Tudor Gothic Revival
- NRHP reference No.: 82003132
- Added to NRHP: September 9, 1982

St. Peter's Episcopal Church is a historic Episcopal church located at 400 W. Wall Street in Harrisonville, Cass County, Missouri. It was built in 1895, and is a one-story, cruciform plan, Tudor Gothic Revival style church. It is constructed of yellow-beige, quarry faced limestone. It features stick work and pseudo half timbering; a square, shingled cupola; lancet windows; and a crenellated parapet.

It was listed on the National Register of Historic Places in 1982.
