= Robert A. Brown House =

Historic house in Missouri, United States

- U.S. National Register of Historic Places
- Location within Missouri Location within the United States
- Location: North of Harrisonville off Alternate U.S. Route 71, Harrisonville, Missouri
- Coordinates: 38°41′3″N 94°23′14″W
- Area: 9.9 acres (4.0 ha)
- Built: 1850
- Architectural style: Classic Revival
- NRHP reference No.: 70000327
- Added to NRHP: June 15, 1970

Robert A. Brown House is a historic home located near Harrisonville, Cass County, Missouri. It was built about 1850, and is a two-story, five-bay, rectangular, Classic Revival style red brick dwelling. It has a rear ell and sits on a limestone foundation. It features a two-story, central wooden portico on the front facade. Also on the property are the contributing brick slave house, smokehouse, and apple house.

It was listed on the National Register of Historic Places in 1970.
