= Chester B. Woodward House =

Historic house in Kansas, United States

- U.S. National Register of Historic Places
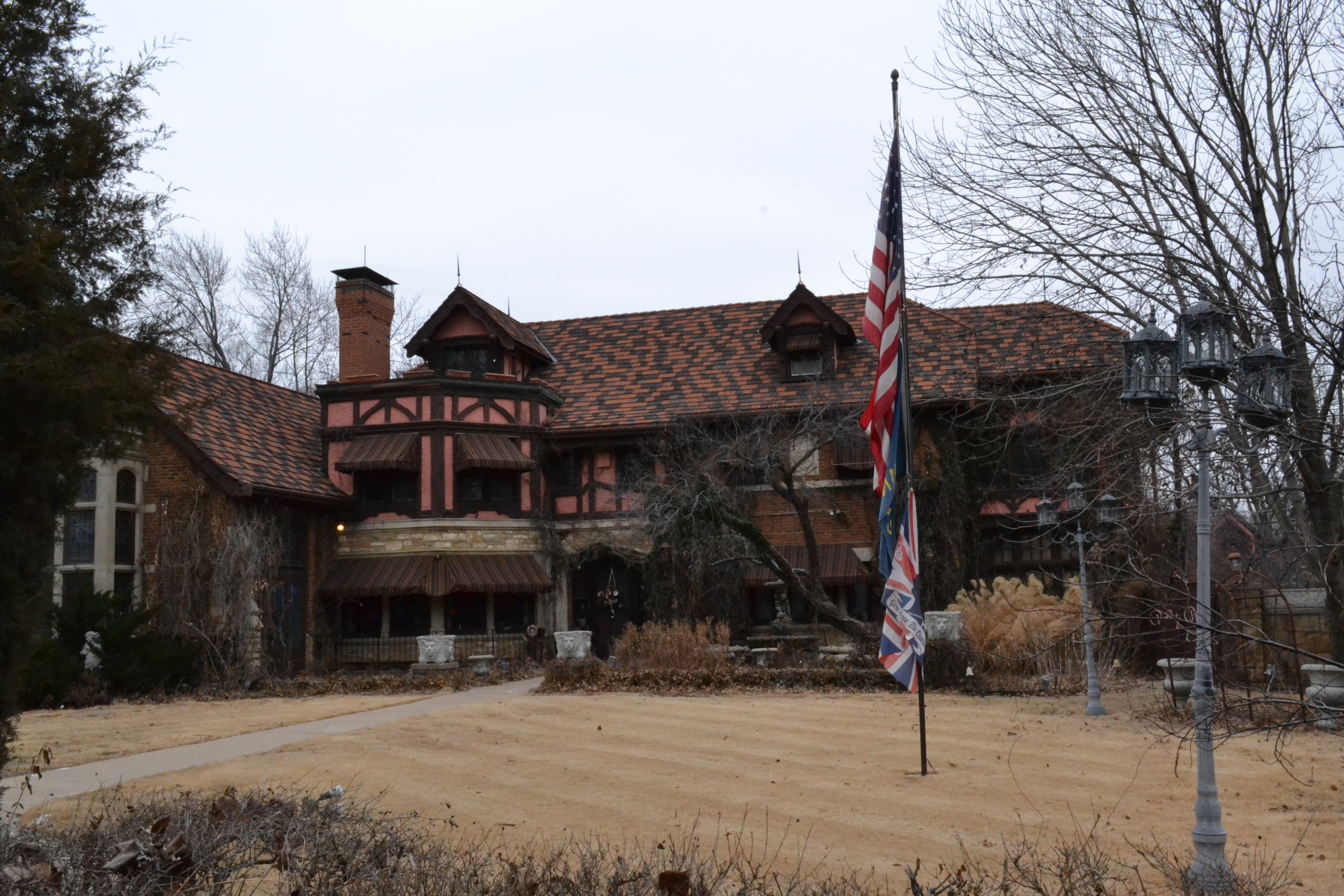
- The Woodward House in 2018

- Location within Kansas
- Location: 1272 SouthWest Fillmore Street, Topeka, Kansas
- Coordinates: 39°02′36″N 95°41′17″W
- Area: less than one acre
- Built: 1923
- Architect: Root & Siemens
- Architectural style: Classical Revival
- NRHP reference No.: 92000817
- Added to NRHP: June 25, 1992

The Chester B. Woodward House is a historic house in Topeka, Kansas. It was built in 1923 for Chester B. Woodward, a businessman. Woodward served as the vice president of the Central National Bank and Trust Company of Topeka from 1920 to 1928 and the president of the Topeka Morris Plan Company from 1928 to 1940.

The house was designed by Root & Siemens in the Classical Revival architectural style. It has been listed on the National Register of Historic Places since June 25, 1992.
