= Ward-Meade House =

Historic house in Kansas, United States

- U.S. National Register of Historic Places
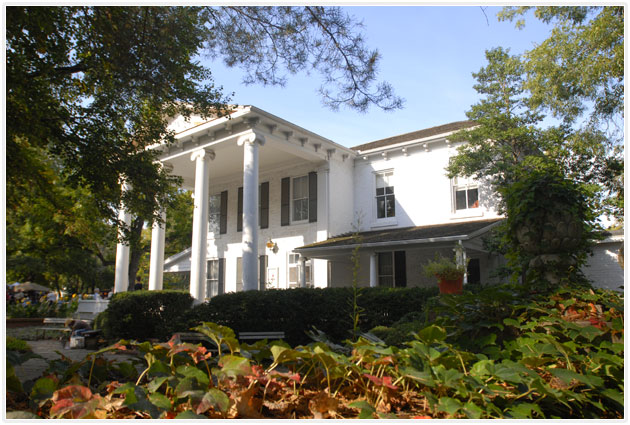
- The Ward-Meade House in 2012

- Location within Kansas
- Location: 124 North Fillmore, Topeka, Kansas
- Coordinates: 39°03′48″N 95°40′57″W
- Area: 5 acres (2.0 ha)
- Built: 1870
- NRHP reference No.: 75000727
- Added to NRHP: November 12, 1975

The Ward-Meade House is a historic house in Topeka, Kansas. It was built in 1870 for Anthony A. Ward and his wife, née Mary Jane Foster. It was inherited by their daughter Jennie, who lived here with her husband John Meade, an engineer for the Atchison, Topeka and Santa Fe Railway. It remained in the Ward-Meade family until 1961, when it was acquired by the city of Topeka.

It has been listed on the National Register of Historic Places since November 12, 1975.

== History ==
The site was originally the homestead of the Anthony A. Ward family, who settled there in the 1850s and who were among the earliest settlers of the area that later became Topeka. The Ward-Meade house is considered the first mansion built in Topeka. Construction began in 1870, the same year as the first wing of the Statehouse.

Anthony Ward was a wheelwright who held the sand rights on the Kansas River near his house. He sold sand to the builders of Topeka and made wheels for wagons that carried settlers to California. The Wards also taught and worked with the Native Americans who lived in the area.

On April 16, 1874, John Mackey Meade, a civil engineer, came to Shawnee County from Virginia to survey the route of the Santa Fe Railroad. He married Jenny Ward, a daughter of Anthony, and they inherited the Ward House when her parents died. The Meades raised seven children in the house, which was owned by members of the family until it was purchased by the City of Topeka in 1960.

== Site development ==
The Ward-Meade house and surrounding five acres were sold to the City of Topeka in the 1960s as a garden center. Shawnee County acquired the site when the City of Topeka and Shawnee County Parks and Recreation Departments consolidated in January 2011; the County continues to maintain part of the grounds as a botanical garden. In 1976, after being placed on the National Historic Register, the house became a Bicentennial project of the Junior League of Topeka. Restoration of the exterior and three main rooms of the first floor of the house were financed by private, state and federal funds. The work was completed and the house was opened to the public for seasonal tours as part of Topeka's Bicentennial celebration. A volunteer board of directors, Historic Topeka Inc., was established to oversee the project. The Board was actively involved in fundraising for the park until 1985.

In 1984, a plan was developed by a group of volunteers affiliated with the Park to establish a prairie town at the site. The plan was approved by the Parks and Recreation Department and the City Commission a year later.

== Old Prairie Town ==
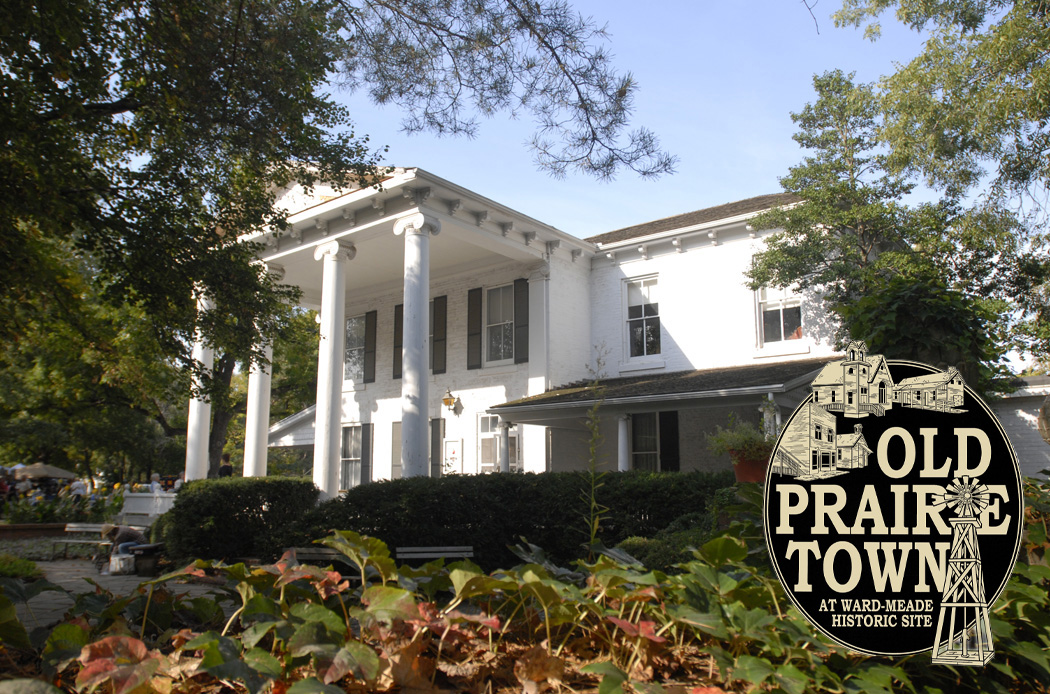
Ward-Meade Mansion with logo

Old Prairie Town at Ward-Meade Historic Site is a 5.5-acre (2.2 ha) open-air museum, park and historic site located in Topeka, Kansas. Old Prairie Town is a county entity, operated by the Shawnee County, Kansas, Parks and Recreation Department with a Recreation Program Supervisor and additional staff plus volunteers.

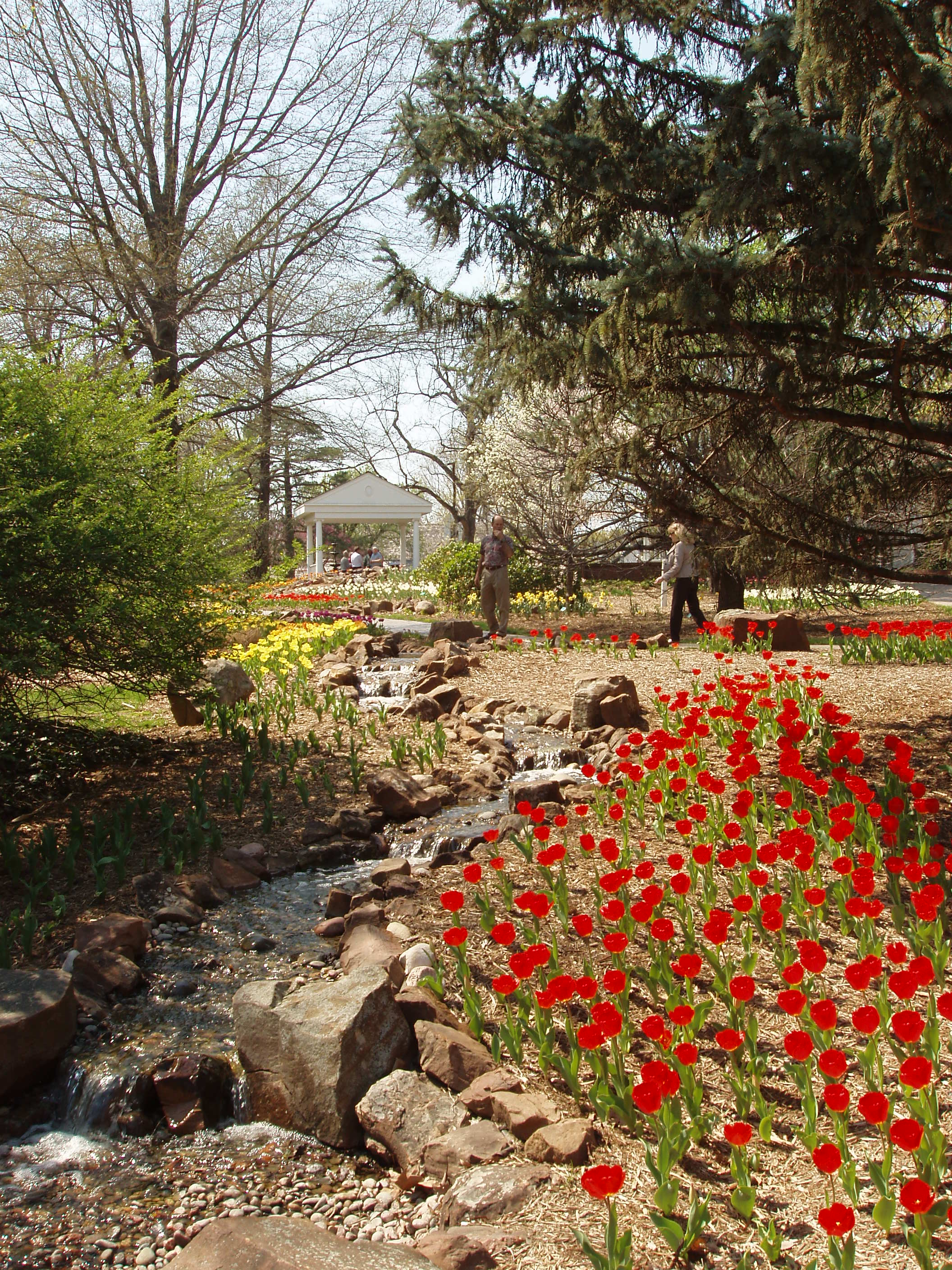
Botanical Garden at Old Prairie Town

The complex includes:

- The 2 1/2-acre (1.0 ha) Ward-Meade Park Botanical Gardens. The gardens were designed by the Topeka Garden Clubs and is now under the care of a full-time horticulture staff of Parks and Recreation.
- The restored 1874 Ward-Meade Mansion, which is on the National Register of Historic Places.
- The replica of the Ward's cabin.
- A developing turn-of-the-century town square called "Prairie Crossings Town Square" and includes:
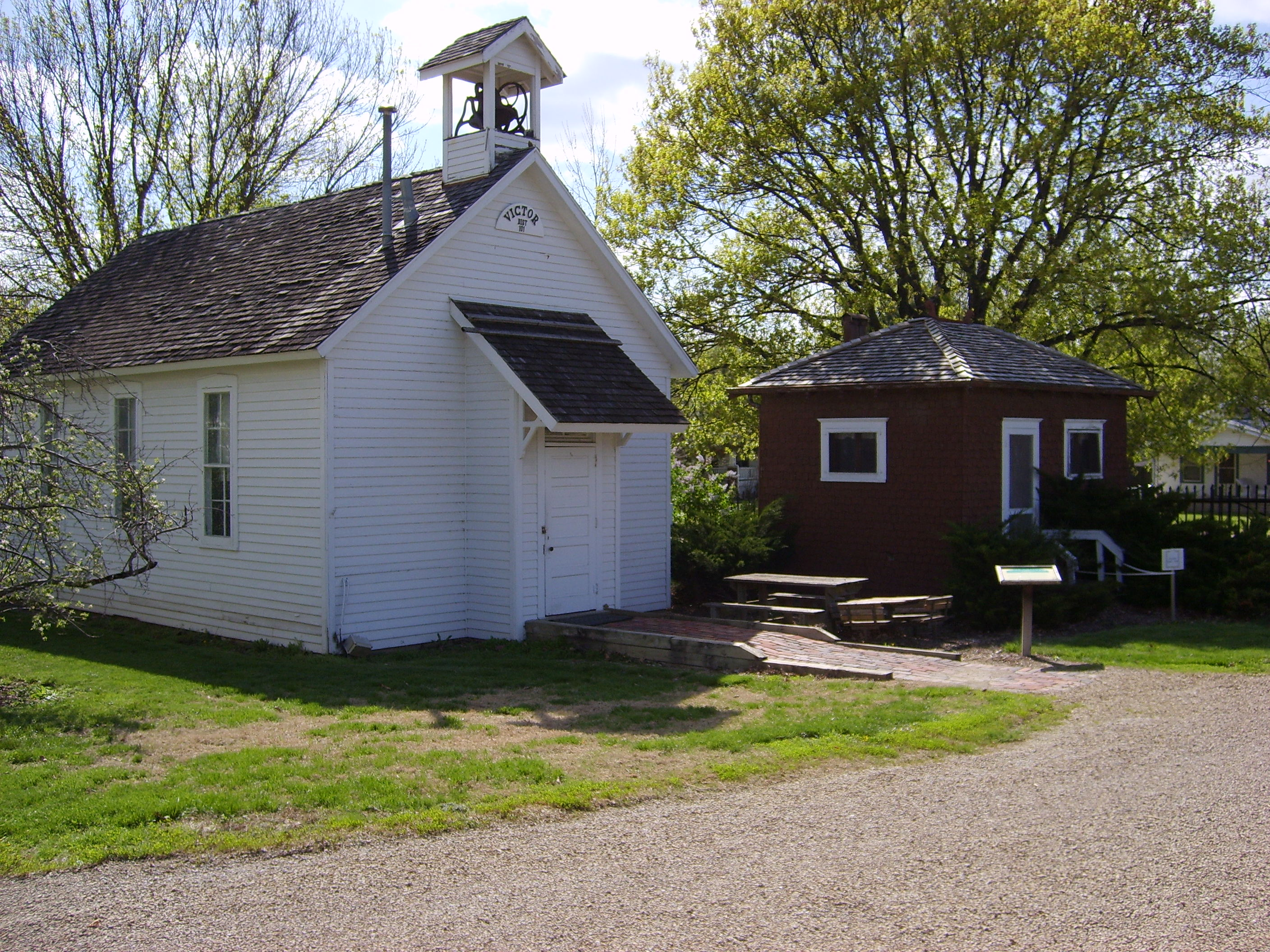
  Victor School House
  - 1891 Victor Schoolhouse from Rossville
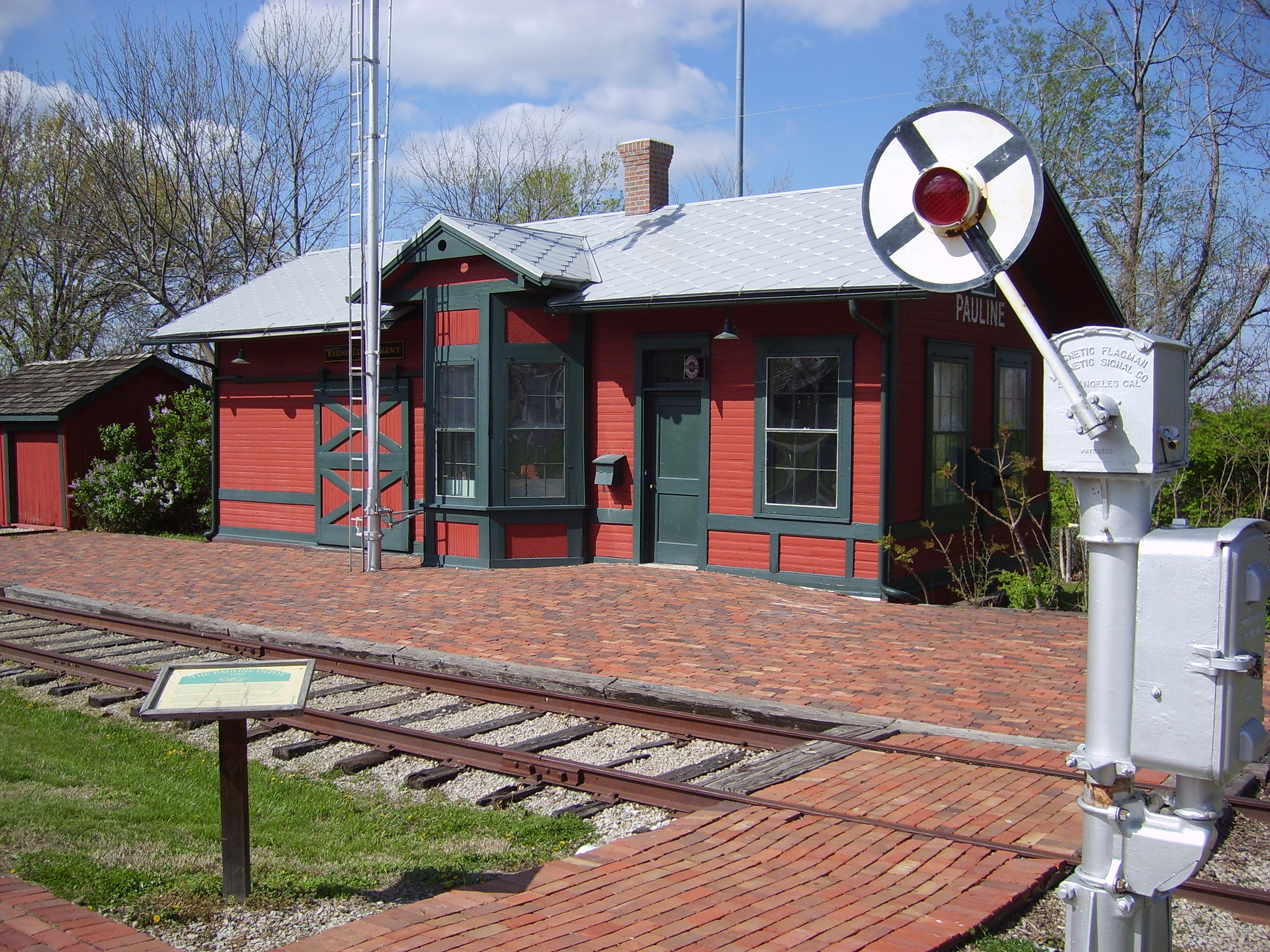
    Pauline Depot
  - Santa Fe Depot and Caboose
  - Lingo Livery Stable (which houses an Oregon Trail exhibit) and the newly built Lingo Tack Shop
  - The original Charles M. Sheldon study
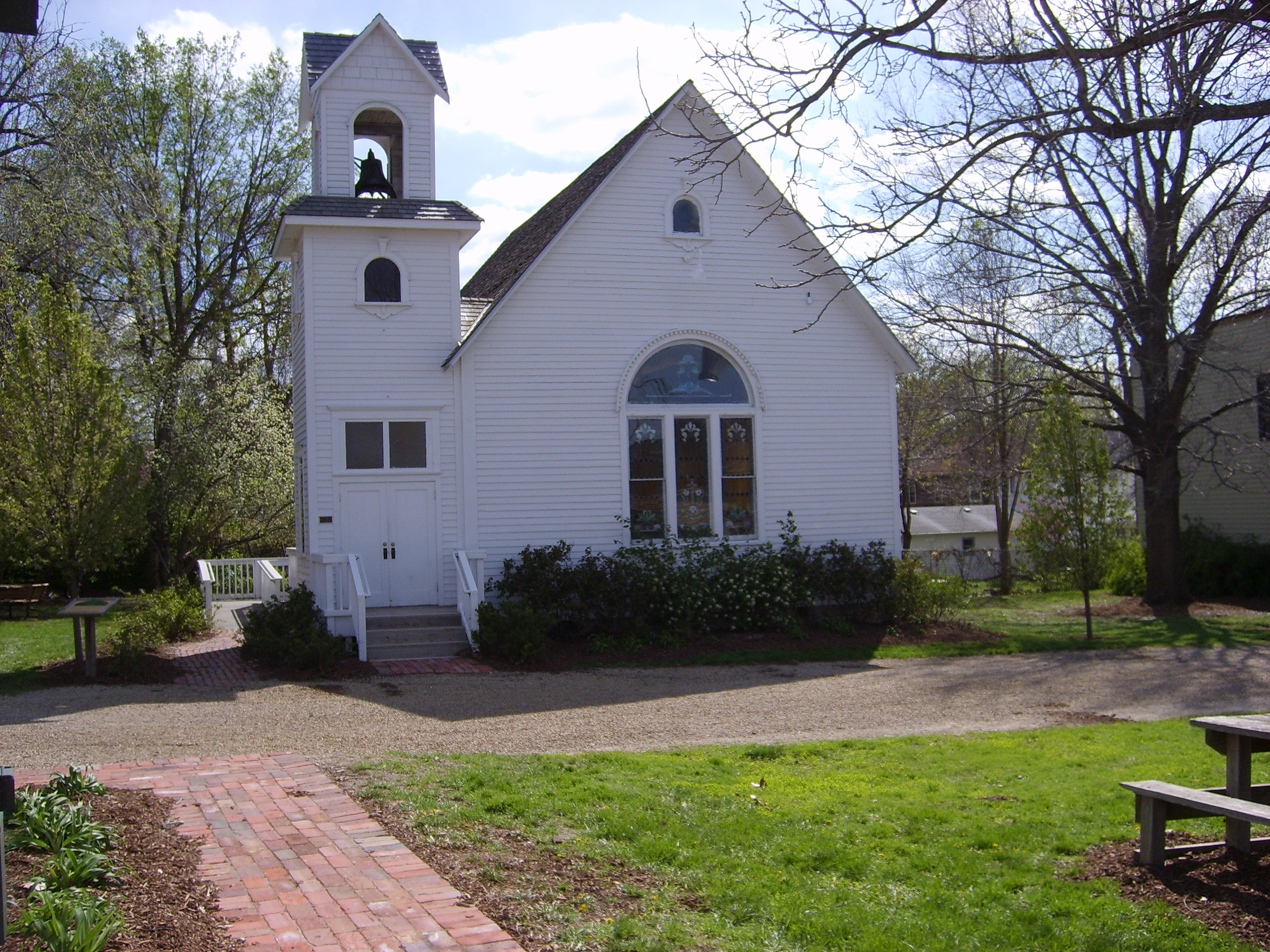
    1880 Everest Church
  - 1880 Everest Church
  - Mulvane General Store, with the bank teller's cage from Georgia Neese Gray's bank. This serves as the gift shop and visitors center.
  - Potwin Drugstore, with a working soda fountain and physician's and dental offices on the second floor. Ice cream and soda fountain treats are served in the drugstore.

== Events ==
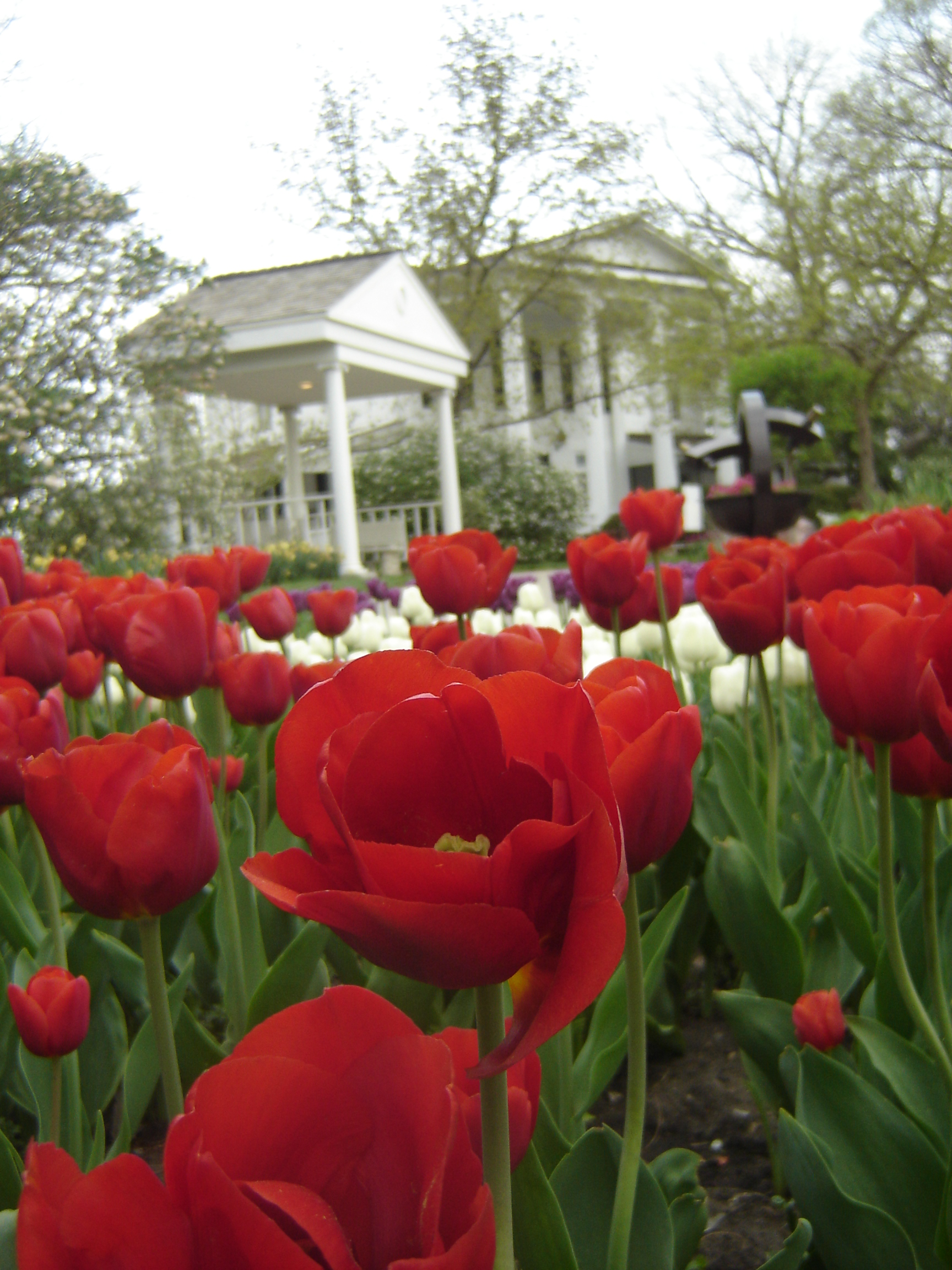
Tulip Time 2013

- Tulip Time - 45,000 tulips are planted at Old Prairie Town in April
- Apple Festival - music, food, entertainment, and arts and crafts on the first Sunday of October
