= Francis and Harriet Baker House =

Historic house in Kansas, United States

- U.S. National Register of Historic Places
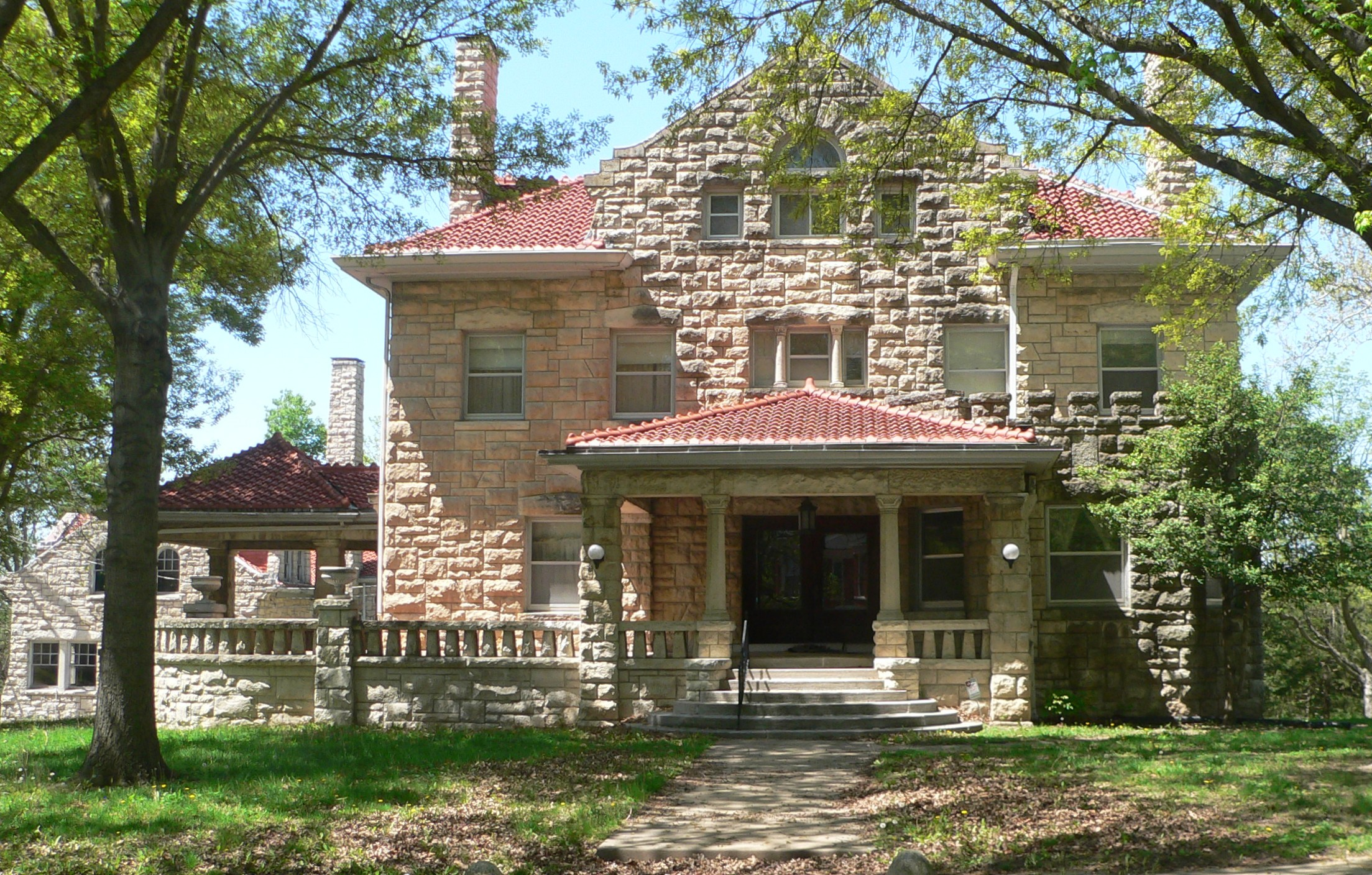
- The Francis and Harriet Baker House in 2015

- Location within Kansas
- Location: 823 North 5th Street, Atchison, Kansas
- Coordinates: 39°34′13″N 95°07′08″W
- Area: less than one acre
- Built: 1902
- Architect: Root & Siemens
- Architectural style: Mission/spanish Revival
- NRHP reference No.: 03000838
- Added to NRHP: August 28, 2003

The Francis and Harriet Baker House is a historic house in Atchison, Kansas. It was built in 1902 for Francis Baker, the co-founder of a grain elevator business in Kansas and Nebraska, and his wife Harriet, the daughter of Atchison's mayor. It was purchased by Frank Harwi, the president of the A.J. Harwi Hardware Company, in 1918.

The house was designed by Root & Siemens in the Mission Revival architectural style and was termed "modern" by Root. It has been listed on the National Register of Historic Places since August 28, 2003.
