= Sidney Root =

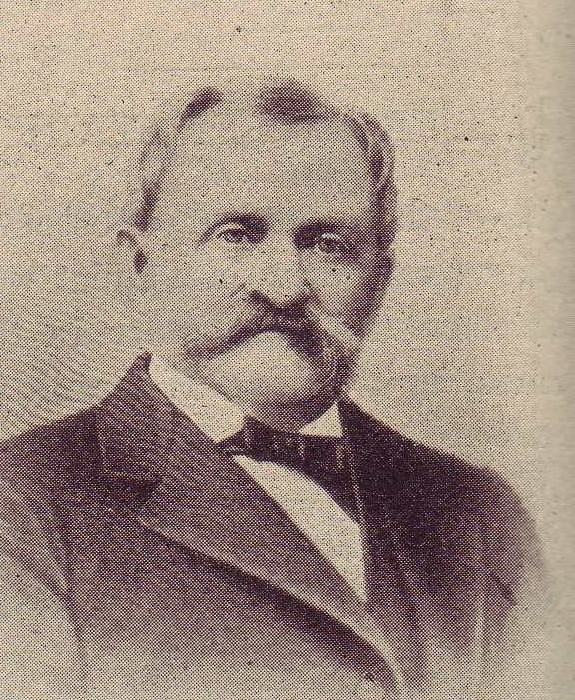
Sidney Root in 1892

Sidney Root (March 11, 1824 – February 13, 1897) was an American businessman.

Root was born in Montague in western Massachusetts, but early in his life his family moved to Vermont, where his boyhood days were spent in the shadow of the Green Mountains. On his father's plantation he acquired the industrious habits which characterized him through life. Though prevented by reason of his father's limited resources from attending school more than three months in the year, he made the most of his meager opportunities and soon found architecture was the passion of his youthful mind. He possessed exceptional talents for skillful and accurate designing, but his practical father considering that such an accomplishment was comparatively worthless, refused to encourage it, and so apprenticed his fourteen-year-old son to an indifferent sort of a jeweler who taught him the business of watch-making.

In the early 1840s, he came to Lumpkin, Georgia, to clerk for Vermont-native William A. Rawson who married Root's sister in 1843. He did well but wanted larger opportunities. In the early summer of 1857 he came to Atlanta to co-partner a dry-goods business with Mr. J.N. Beach. In the autumn of that year, on the railroad from St. Louis to Chicago, he met with accident which broke his hand and arm in five places.

In the Spring of 1861, he decided to support secession over union. At the beginning of the American Civil War he helped organize the Board of Direct Trade to ensure Confederate trade to Europe was not disrupted. In this capacity he was sent to Europe but he returned home only to find his immense property interests destroyed by the Union and himself under arrest. As soon as he obtained his release he sold out his remaining fragments of real estate to Gov. Joseph E. Brown and went to New York, where he again established himself in business, maintaining connection with Liverpool and Charleston. He also helped establish the Mount Olivet Church at the request of freed African-Americans. He remained in New York until 1878 when he closed out his business in the metropolis and came to Atlanta. Back in Atlanta he continued his philanthropy work. He served as a trustee for Spellman Seminary, and through his association with Colonel Lemuel P. Grant, was given charge of constructing the L.P. Grant Park and being its Park Superintendent.

From the date of his return until the time of his death he was one of its foremost citizens and when it was decided to hold the International Cotton Exposition in 1881, Mr. Root was commissioned to visit Europe in behalf of the enterprise where he successfully sold shares in the corporation.

Root was a great lover of nature and he suggested old colleague Lemuel Grant donate land to create a park. Soon after, in 1883, Root was named park commissioner by mayor John B. Goodwin in which office he was largely responsible for the construction of Grant Park. He served as chairman of the city's board of park commissioners for years, bringing to bear his artistic tastes as well as his ripe experience in beautifying what was then a resort at Grant Park.

His two sons were architects: John Wellborn Root, chief architect of the World Columbian Exposition and Walter Root in Kansas City.

He died on February 13, 1897, at his daughter's house in Atlanta. His obituary in the New York Times proclaimed that he was Jefferson Davis's closest friend after the Civil War.

== Notes ==
- This article incorporates text from the public domain 1902 book, Atlanta And Its Builders by Thomas H. Martin and entries from the Memorandum of My Life, Sidney Root, March 14, 1824-1894 as made by Sharon Gayle Conner Whitney, Ph.D.
