= Scarritt Building and Arcade =

- U.S. National Register of Historic Places
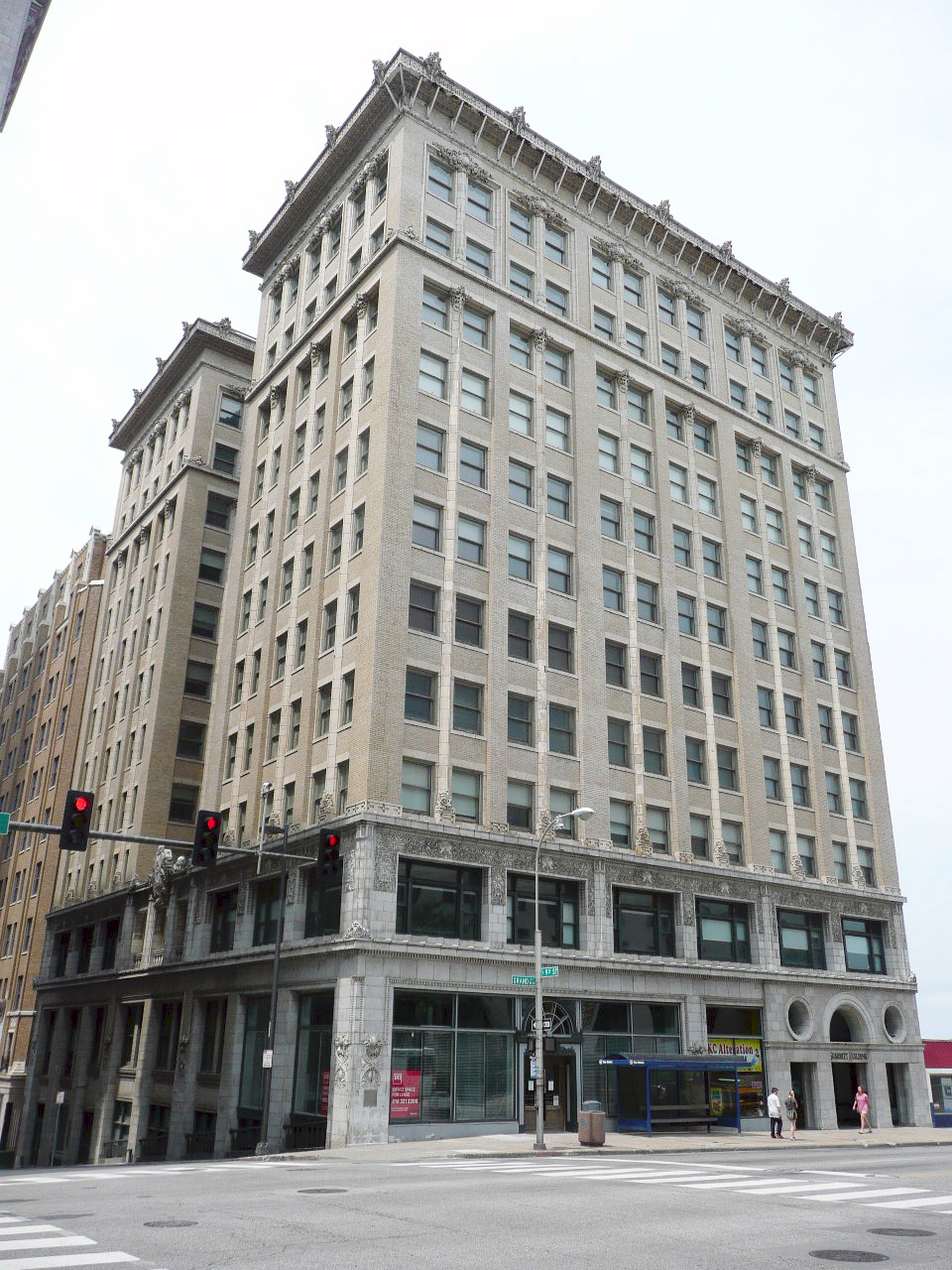
- The Scarritt Building in 2015

- Location within Missouri Location within the United States
- Location: Corner of 9th and Grand Streets and 819 Walnut Street, Kansas City, Missouri
- Coordinates: 39°06′13″N 94°34′47″W
- Area: 9.9 acres (4.0 ha)
- Built: 1906
- Architect: Root & Siemens
- Architectural style: Chicago style
- NRHP reference No.: 71000468
- Added to NRHP: March 9, 1971

The Scarritt Building and Arcade is a historic building in Kansas City, Missouri. It was built in 1906. It was designed by Root & Siemens. It has been listed on the National Register of Historic Places since March 9, 1971.
