= John Sargent House =

Historic house in Kansas, United States

- U.S. National Register of Historic Places
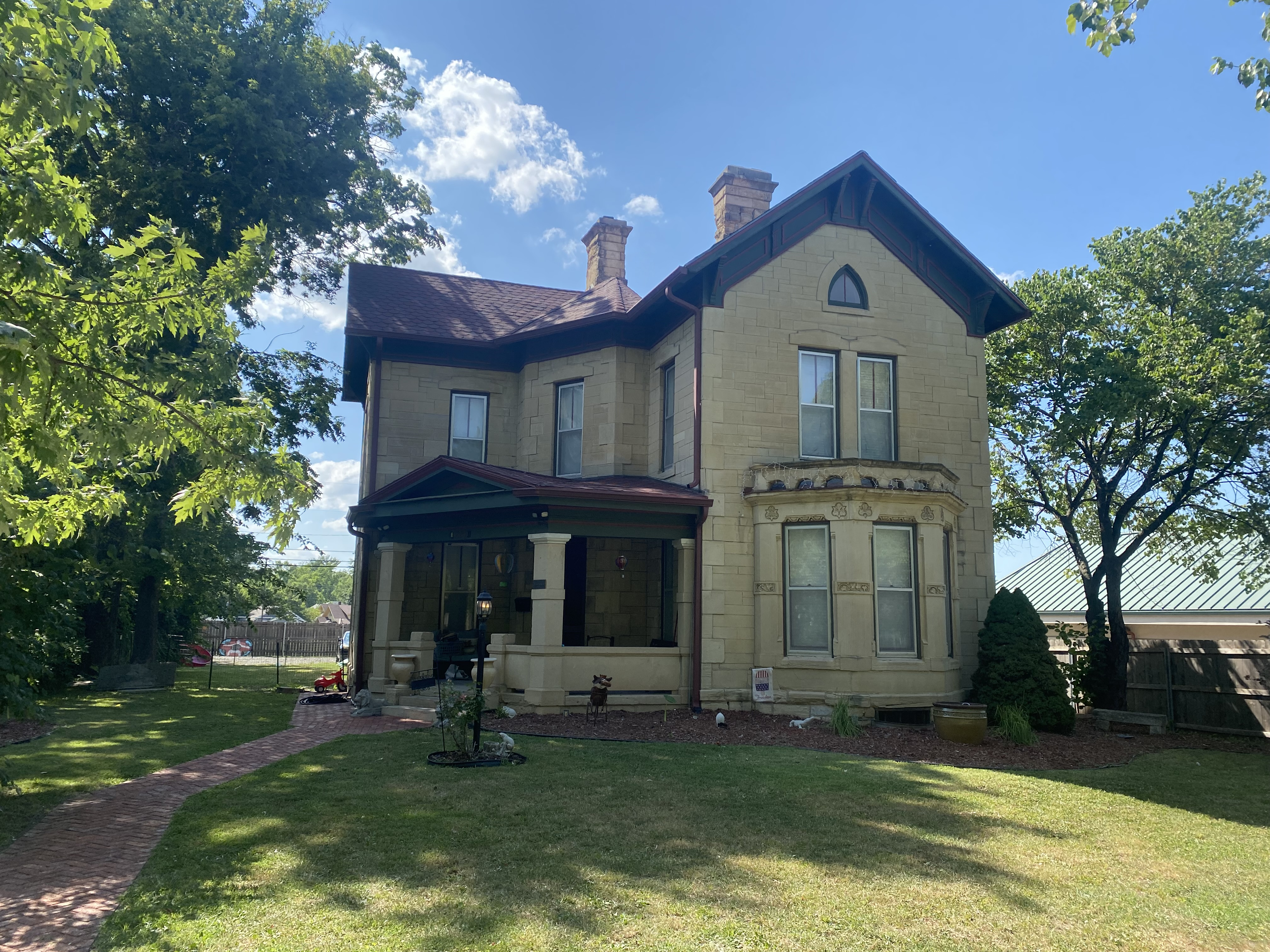
- John Sargent Historical House in Topeka, Kansas

- Location within Kansas Location within the United States
- Location: 225 SW Clay Street, Topeka, Kansas
- Coordinates: 39°3′38″N 95°41′8″W
- Area: less than one acre
- Built: c. 1882
- Architect: Sargent, John
- Architectural style: Late Gothic Revival
- NRHP reference No.: 95000930
- Added to NRHP: July 28, 1995

The John Sargent House is a historic house located at 225 SW Clay St. in Topeka, Kansas. The house is considered to be a leading example of Gothic Revival architecture in Kansas.

== Description and history ==
The two-story, ell-shaped, limestone, Late Gothic Revival house was built c. 1882, and stands on a limestone foundation and is surmounted by a cross-gabled, asphalt shingled roof. A two-story, gable roof, limestone addition to the west was added c. 1910. The building has a southeast facade orientation.

It was added to the National Register of Historic Places on July 28, 1995
