= North Topeka Baptist Church =

Historic church in Kansas, United States

Coordinates: 39.069123°N 95.667116°W

- U.S. National Register of Historic Places
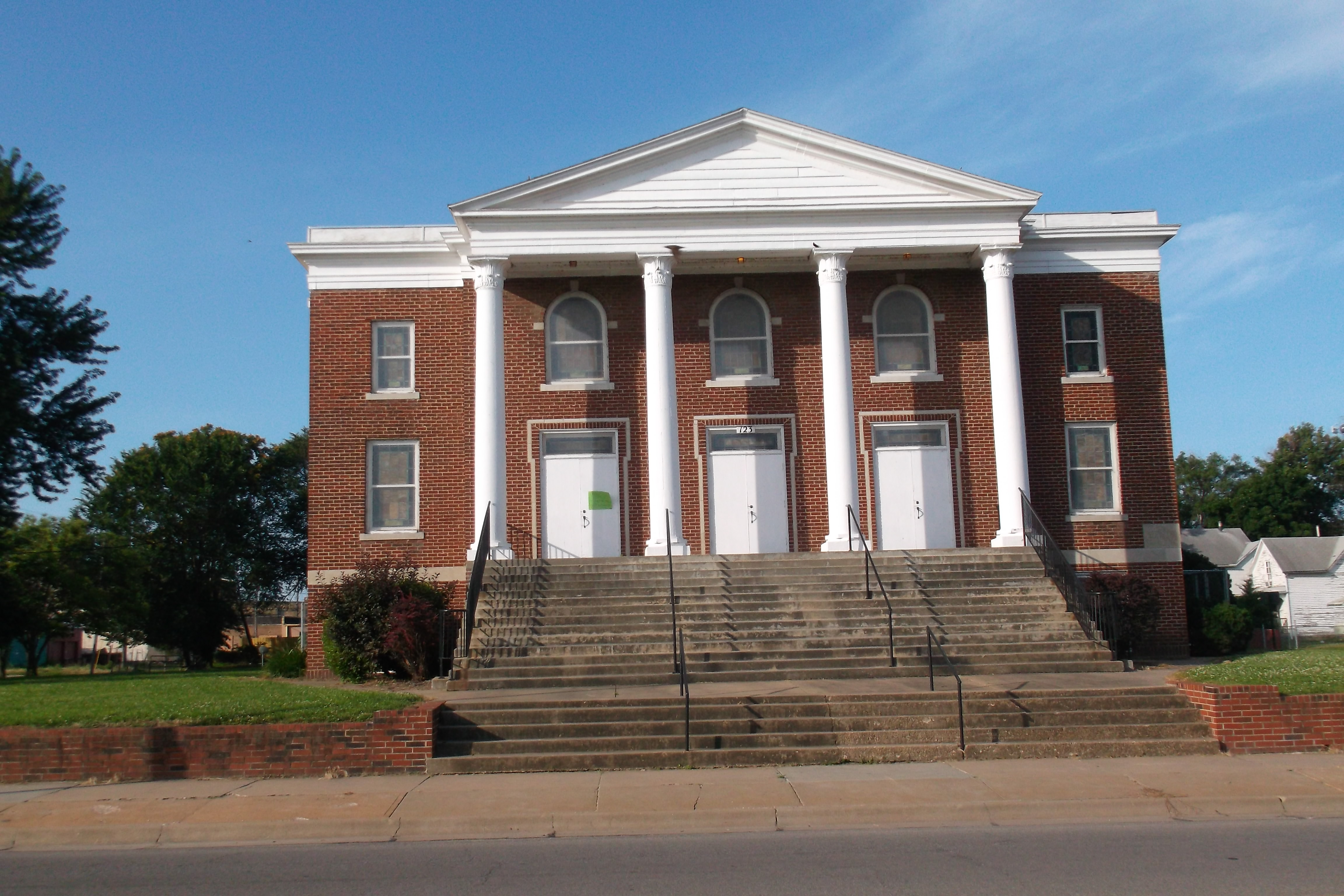
- North Topeka Baptist Church in 2014

- Location within Kansas Location within the United States
- Location: 123 NW Gordon, Topeka, Kansas
- NRHP reference No.: 10001137
- Added to NRHP: January 18, 2011

North Topeka Baptist Church is a church building at 123 NW Gordon in Topeka, Kansas, United States. It was added to the National Register of Historic Places in 2011.

It was built in 1921. It survived a flood in 1951.
