= Potwin Place Historic District =

- U.S. National Register of Historic Places
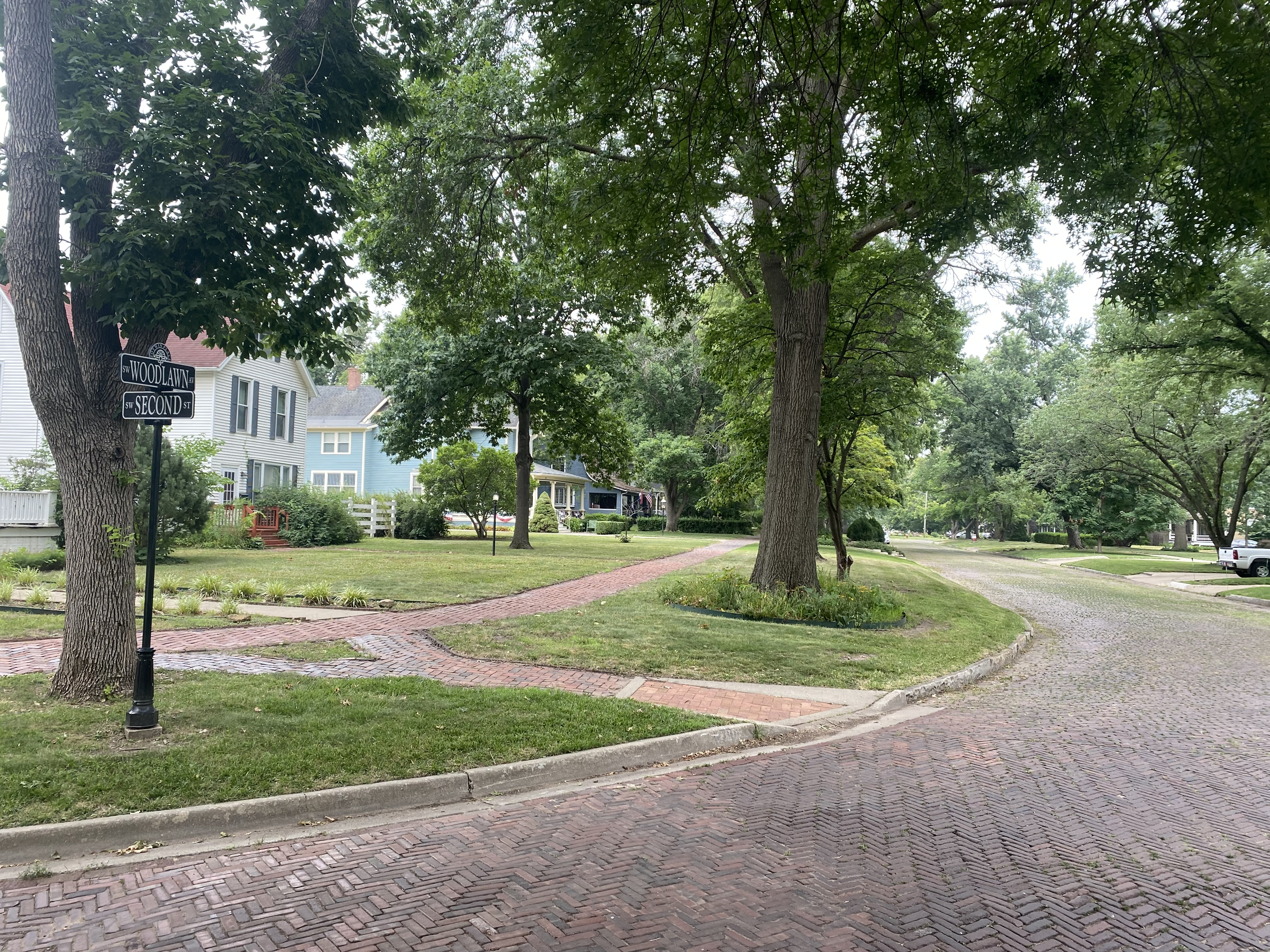
- Potwin Historical District in Topeka, Kansas at junction of Second and Woodlawn

- Location within Kansas Location within the United States
- Location: Topeka, Kansas
- Coordinates: 39.061887°N 95.694119°W
- NRHP reference No.: 80001476
- Added to NRHP: May 1, 1980

Potwin Place Historic District (known locally as Potwin) is a neighborhood of Topeka, Kansas. The neighborhood is well known for its brick-lined streets and variety of Victorian and Queen Anne style homes. It is bounded by SW Willow Ave (south), SW Woodlawn Ave (west), NW Grove Ave (north) and SE Greenwood Ave (east).

== History ==
Charles Wolcott Potwin, a banker from Zanesville, Ohio, purchased several acres of land from a Shawnee Native American in 1869. In 1882, Potwin divided the land into 80 lots for development. By 1885, the lots were available for purchase.

In 1888, the area was incorporated as the City of Potwin. There was controversy as many Topeka residents had become resentful as many Potwin residents were making their money in Topeka and not spending it there. In 1899, the City of Topeka annexed Potwin, mostly due to the lack of public services in the area.
