= Harrisonville, Missouri =

- City
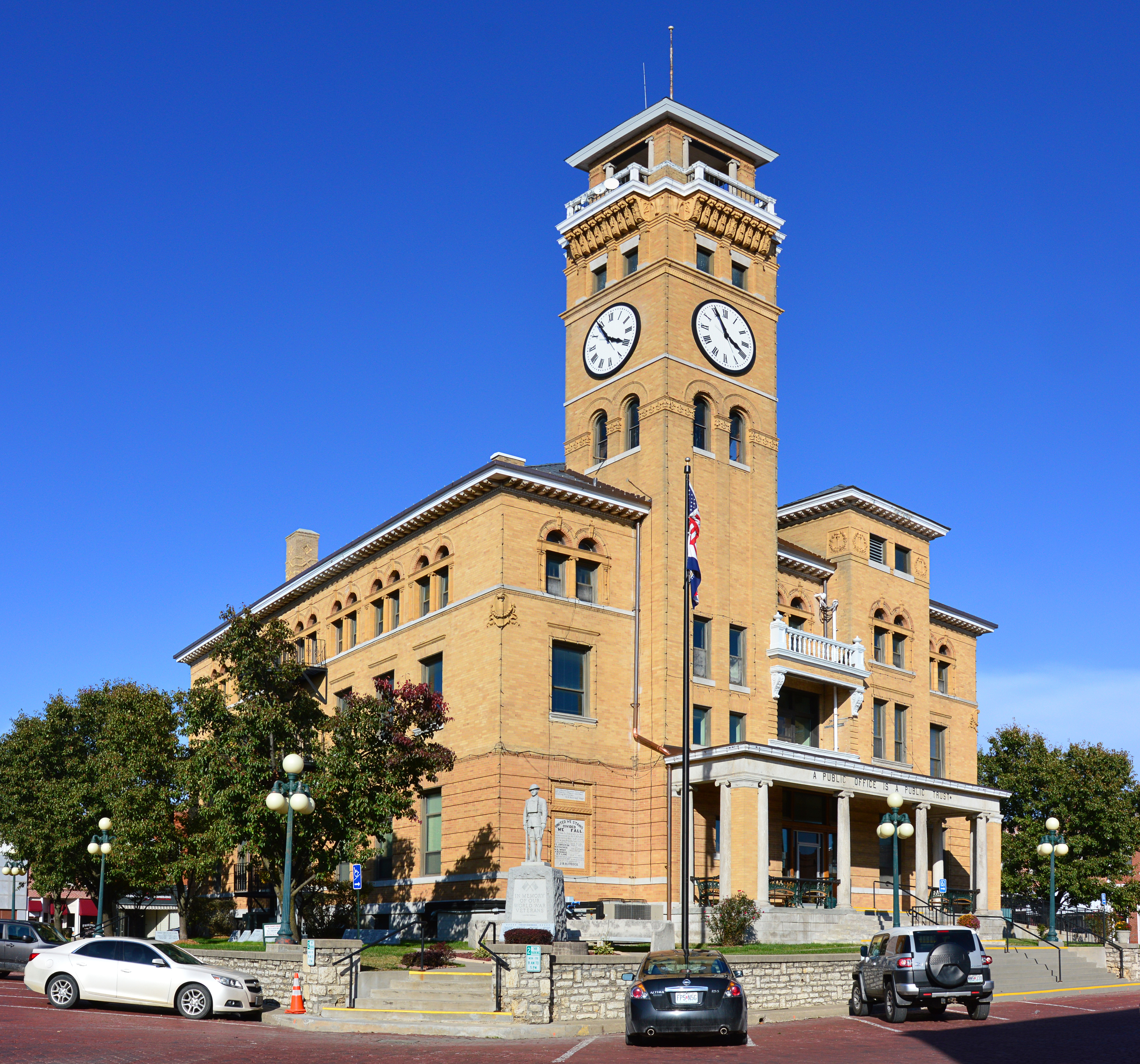
- Centerpiece of the Harrisonville Courthouse Square Historic District

- Location in the state of Missouri
- Coordinates: 38°39′11″N 94°20′48″W
- Country: United States
- State: Missouri
- County: Cass
- Incorporated: 1851

Government
  - Mayor: Mike Zaring

Area
  - Total: 10.02 sq mi (25.94 km^{2})
  - Land: 9.88 sq mi (25.60 km^{2})
  - Water: 0.13 sq mi (0.34 km^{2})
- Elevation: 945 ft (288 m)

Population (2020)
  - Total: 10,121
  - Density: 1,024.1/sq mi (395.39/km^{2})
- Time zone: UTC-6 (CST)
  - Summer (DST): UTC-5 (CDT)
- ZIP code: 64701
- Area codes: 816, 975
- FIPS code: 29-30610
- GNIS feature ID: 2394306
- Website: ci.harrisonville.mo.us

Harrisonville is a city in Cass County, Missouri, United States. The population was 10,121 at the 2020 census. It is the county seat of Cass County. It is part of the Kansas City metropolitan area.

== History ==
Harrisonville was founded in 1837 upon land donated to Cass County by Congress for county purposes, and was named for Congressman Albert G. Harrison, who was instrumental in obtaining the land grant. The area suffered greatly during the American Civil War, though Harrisonville was one of the few places exempted in Union General Thomas Ewing's General Order No. 11 (1863), which ordered the depopulation of three entire Missouri counties and part of a fourth.

In 1972, Harrisonville was the site of escalating tensions between a handful of mostly Vietnam veterans and town elders, which culminated in a brief rampage by 25-year-old Charlie "Ootney" Simpson. In the town square, in plain view of onlookers, he killed two police officers and a bystander before shooting himself. The victims were officers Donald Marler and Francis Wirt and local businessman Orville Allen. His motivation turned out to be personal, not political; he had saved money to buy a farm, but the seller had recently backed out of the deal, and Simpson had used the money to bail his friends out of jail. The Marler, Wirt, Allen Memorial Park honors the men and shares the history of the Harrisonville Square shooting.

The Robert A. Brown House, Harrisonville Courthouse Square Historic District, and St. Peter's Episcopal Church are listed on the National Register of Historic Places.

A May 2017 report from Missouri State Auditor Nicole Galloway gave the city the lowest possible rating of "poor," citing complex, often overlapping tax districts, contracts awarded without appropriate bidding processes and overuse of money pulled from restricted funds.

== Geography ==
Harrisonville is located in central Cass County at the intersection of U.S. 71, Missouri Route 2 and Missouri Route 7.

According to the United States Census Bureau, the city has a total area of 10.01 square miles (25.93 km^{2}), of which 9.88 square miles (25.59 km^{2}) is land and 0.13 square miles (0.34 km^{2}) is water.

== Demographics ==
Historical population
Census	Pop.	Note	%±
1860	675		—
1870	1,032		52.9%
1880	1,113		7.8%
1890	1,645		47.8%
1900	1,844		12.1%
1910	1,947		5.6%
1920	2,073		6.5%
1930	2,306		11.2%
1940	2,322		0.7%
1950	2,530		9.0%
1960	3,510		38.7%
1970	5,052		43.9%
1980	6,372		26.1%
1990	7,683		20.6%
2000	8,946		16.4%
2010	10,019		12.0%
2020	10,121		1.0%
U.S. Decennial Census

=== Racial and ethnic composition ===
Harrisonville city, Missouri – Racial and ethnic composition Note: the US Census treats Hispanic/Latino as an ethnic category. This table excludes Latinos from the racial categories and assigns them to a separate category. Hispanics/Latinos may be of any race.
Race / Ethnicity (NH = Non-Hispanic)	Pop 2000	Pop 2010	Pop 2020	% 2000	% 2010	% 2020
White alone (NH)	8,536	9,360	8,878	95.42%	93.42%	87.72%
Black or African American alone (NH)	84	114	152	0.94%	1.14%	1.50%
Native American or Alaska Native alone (NH)	56	68	55	0.63%	0.68%	0.54%
Asian alone (NH)	41	57	65	0.46%	0.57%	0.64%
Native Hawaiian or Pacific Islander alone (NH)	0	4	5	0.00%	0.04%	0.05%
Other race alone (NH)	4	0	43	0.04%	0.00%	0.42%
Mixed race or Multiracial (NH)	99	151	550	1.11%	1.51%	5.43%
Hispanic or Latino (any race)	126	265	373	1.41%	2.64%	3.69%
Total	8,946	10,019	10,121	100.00%	100.00%	100.00%

=== 2020 census ===
As of the 2020 census, Harrisonville had a population of 10,121. The median age was 37.0 years. 25.4% of residents were under the age of 18 and 17.1% of residents were 65 years of age or older. For every 100 females there were 93.1 males, and for every 100 females age 18 and over there were 89.0 males age 18 and over.

92.9% of residents lived in urban areas, while 7.1% lived in rural areas.

There were 3,959 households in Harrisonville, including 2,368 families. Of the households, 32.5% had children under the age of 18 living in them. Of all households, 41.3% were married-couple households, 17.5% were households with a male householder and no spouse or partner present, and 33.0% were households with a female householder and no spouse or partner present. About 32.0% of all households were made up of individuals and 15.0% had someone living alone who was 65 years of age or older.

There were 4,214 housing units, of which 6.1% were vacant. The homeowner vacancy rate was 1.1% and the rental vacancy rate was 5.2%.

Racial composition as of the 2020 census
Race	Number	Percent
White	9,010	89.0%
Black or African American	156	1.5%
American Indian and Alaska Native	61	0.6%
Asian	67	0.7%
Native Hawaiian and Other Pacific Islander	7	0.1%
Some other race	156	1.5%
Two or more races	664	6.6%

=== Income and poverty ===
The 2016–2020 5-year American Community Survey estimates show that the median household income was $49,920 (with a margin of error of +/- $5,005) and the median family income was $59,545 (+/- $11,932). Males had a median income of $35,587 (+/- $9,041) versus $25,156 (+/- $7,527) for females. The median income for those above 16 years old was $30,395 (+/- $5,263). Approximately, 11.0% of families and 14.7% of the population were below the poverty line, including 22.8% of those under the age of 18 and 9.0% of those ages 65 or over.

=== 2010 census ===
As of the census of 2010, there were 10,019 people, 3,854 households, and 2,516 families living in the city. The population density was 1,014.1 inhabitants per square mile (391.5/km^{2}). There were 4,144 housing units at an average density of 419.4 per square mile (161.9/km^{2}). The racial makeup of the city was 95.0% White, 1.1% African American, 0.7% Native American, 0.6% Asian, 0.8% from other races, and 1.7% from two or more races. Hispanic or Latino of any race were 2.6% of the population.

There were 3,854 households, of which 36.6% had children under the age of 18 living with them, 44.7% were married couples living together, 15.3% had a female householder with no husband present, 5.3% had a male householder with no wife present, and 34.7% were non-families. 29.6% of all households were made up of individuals, and 13.9% had someone living alone who was 65 years of age or older. The average household size was 2.49 and the average family size was 3.07.

The median age in the city was 35.5 years. 27.1% of residents were under the age of 18; 8.4% were between the ages of 18 and 24; 26.6% were from 25 to 44; 22.4% were from 45 to 64; and 15.5% were 65 years of age or older. The gender makeup of the city was 47.2% male and 52.8% female.

=== 2000 census ===
As of the census of 2000, there were 8,946 people, 3,457 households, and 2,302 families living in the city. The population density was 1,035.2 inhabitants per square mile (399.7/km^{2}). There were 3,646 housing units at an average density of 421.9 per square mile (162.9/km^{2}). The racial makeup of the city was 96.15% White, 0.97% African American, 0.66% Native American, 0.47% Asian, 0.01% Pacific Islander, 0.39% from other races, and 1.34% from two or more races. Hispanic or Latino of any race were 1.41% of the population.

There were 3,457 households, out of which 35.5% had children under the age of 18 living with them, 50.6% were married couples living together, 12.4% had a female householder with no husband present, and 33.4% were non-families. 28.9% of all households were made up of individuals, and 14.0% had someone living alone who was 65 years of age or older. The average household size was 2.48 and the average family size was 3.05.

In the city, the population was spread out, with 27.6% under the age of 18, 8.1% from 18 to 24, 29.4% from 25 to 44, 19.6% from 45 to 64, and 15.3% who were 65 years of age or older. The median age was 35 years. For every 100 females, there were 87.4 males. For every 100 females age 18 and over, there were 82.8 males.

The median household income was $39,498, and the median family income was $47,761. Males had a median income of $31,931 versus $22,416 for females. The per capita income for the city was $17,280. About 4.7% of families and 6.5% of the population were below the poverty line, including 8.4% of those under age 18 and 5.1% of those age 65 or over.

== Education ==
Harrisonville R-IX School District is the local school district. It operates an Early Childhood Center, two elementary schools, one middle school, Harrisonville High School, and Cass Career Center.

Harrisonville has a public library, a branch of the Cass County Public Library.

Metropolitan Community College has the Harrisonville school district area in its service area, but not its in-district taxation area.

== Transportation ==
Intercity bus service to the city is provided by Jefferson Lines.

== Notable people ==
- Robert C. Bell, United States federal judge
- Angelica Bridges, actress, model, and singer
- Delmer Brown, Japanologist
- Lash E. Gideon, a minstrel performer and manager who played the cornet and his wife Zarilda lived in Harrisonville
- Brutus Hamilton, silver medalist in the 1920 Olympics, decathlon; coach to Glenn Cunningham, gold medalist in the 1932 Olympics, decathlon; coach to Glenn Morris, gold medalist in the 1936 Olympics, decathlon; coach to Robert Mathias, gold medalist in the 1952 Olympics, decathlon.
- Vicky Hartzler, Member of the US House Of Representatives For Missouri's 4th District
- Chris Koster, 41st Attorney General of Missouri
- Edward Capehart O'Kelley, killed Robert Ford, who had previously killed Jesse James
- Harry S. Truman, 33rd President of the United States, lived near Harrisonville for about a year in 1886.
- Vernon and Kay Walker, founders of Family Center Farm and Home
