= University of Kansas Natural History Museum =

- Dyche Hall, University of Kansas
- U.S. National Register of Historic Places
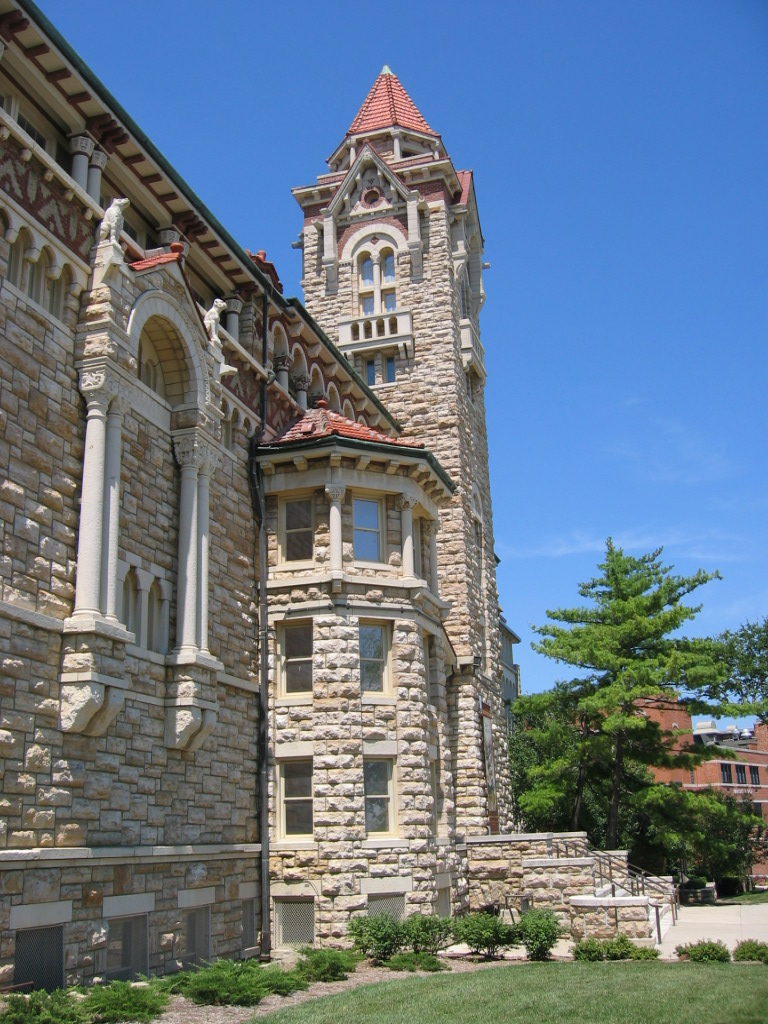
- Museum of Natural History, Dyche Hall, the University of Kansas, Lawrence, Kansas

- Location within Kansas Location within the United States
- Location: 14th St. and Oread Ave., University of Kansas campus, Lawrence, Kansas
- Coordinates: 38°57′31″N 95°14′38″W
- Built: 1901
- Architect: Root & Siemens; Bennett, Henry
- Architectural style: Romanesque
- NRHP reference No.: 74000829
- Added to NRHP: July 14, 1974

The University of Kansas Natural History Museum is part of the University of Kansas Biodiversity Institute, a KU designated research center dedicated to the study of the life of the planet.

The museum's galleries are in Dyche Hall on the university's main campus in Lawrence, Kansas. The galleries are open from 9 a.m. to 5 p.m. Tuesday through Saturday and noon to 4 p.m. on Sundays. Dyche Hall has been listed on the National Register of Historic Places since July 14, 1974; it was listed for its connection with Lewis Lindsay Dyche and for its distinctive Romanesque style of architecture. The exterior is constructed of local Oread Limestone, while the window facings, columns, arches, and grotesques are carved from Cottonwood Limestone. Dyche Hall is also the site of one of only three Victory Eagle statues in Kansas, once used as markers on the Victory Highway.

Among its more than 350 separate exhibits, the museum is famous for its Panorama of North American Wildlife, part of which represented Kansas in the 1893 World's Colombian Exposition in Chicago, and was the impetus for the funding and construction of Dyche Hall and its Natural History Museum between 1901 and 1903. Modeled after a church in France, Dyche Hall was designed to house the Panorama in the "apse" of the entrance gallery. The museum is also renowned for Comanche, the only survivor on the U.S. Cavalry side of the Battle of the Little Bighorn; for its extensive exhibits of plesiosaurs, mosasaurs, pterosaurs, and other fossils from the Kansas Chalk; and most recently for its newest displays of mammalian skulls, the parasites of sharks and rays, and the pre-Columbian archaeology of Costa Rica.

The Biodiversity Institute, with more than 10 million specimens of plants, animals, fossils, and archaeological artifacts, is one of the world's leaders in collection-based studies of systematics, evolution, phylogenetics, paleobiology, past cultures, biodiversity modeling, and in providing digital access to collection-based biodiversity data biodiversity informatics, including deploying these data for forecasting environmental phenomena. The Institute's collections, faculty-curators, staff and students are housed in six buildings across the KU campus, with the most recent expansion occurring in 2006–2007, when the Division of Entomology, along with parts of the ornithological and mammal collection, were moved to a new facility on the university's West Campus.

== See also ==
- Charles Duncan Michener
- Michael S. Engel
- List of oldest buildings on Kansas colleges and universities
