= Topeka Zoo =

Zoo in Topeka, Kansas, U.S.

- Interactive map of Topeka Zoo
- 39.0569°N 95.7259°W
- Location: Topeka, Kansas, United States
- No. of animals: 300+
- Annual visitors: 250,000
- Memberships: AZA WAZA and Elephant Managers Association
- Public transit: Topeka Metro
- Website: topekazoo.org

The Topeka Zoo (formally the Topeka Zoological Park) is a medium-sized zoo in Topeka, Kansas in the United States. It is located within Gage Park, just off I-70 in the north central portion of the city. Despite its size, it houses over 300 animals in a number of exhibits, including one of the first indoor tropical rain forests in the United States. It is one of the most popular attractions in Topeka, with over 250,000 visitors a year.

The Topeka Zoo is an accredited member of the Association of Zoos and Aquariums (AZA).

== History ==
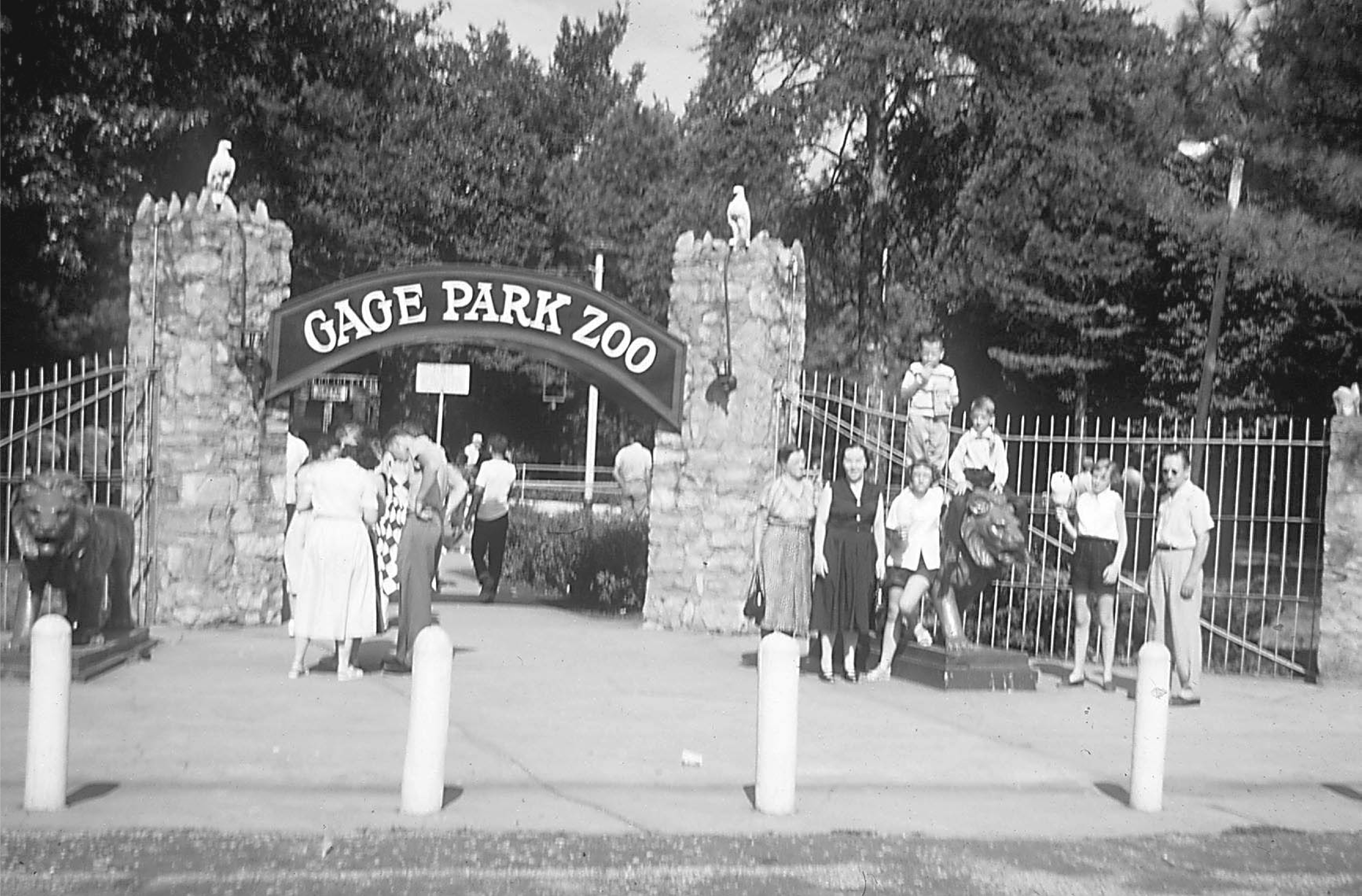
Entrance gate The zoo was originally known as the Gage Park Zoo.

The Gage Family donated 80 acres (32 ha) to the city of Topeka in 1899 to use for a public park. Over the years, the park has accumulated playgrounds, a swimming pool, a fishing lake, a mini train, a rose garden, and a carousel.

The zoo was opened in the park in 1933. Additional exhibits were constructed over the years, and in 1963 the city hired its first zoo director, Gary K. Clarke. The first major facility at the zoo was constructed in 1966 to house large mammals. Clarke went on to get many of the current exhibits constructed, including Gorilla Encounter (1985), the temporary Koala Exhibit (1986), Lions Pride (1989), the Tropical Rainforest, and Discovering Apes.

The zoo lost its accreditation with the Association of Zoos and Aquariums in 2001, due to mismanagement, poor conditions for some of the animals being exhibited, and the deaths of several animals. In 2003, after a major overhaul of the zoo and the addition of several new exhibits, the Topeka Zoo regained its accreditation.

In 2010, the City hired a new zoo director by the name of Brendan Wiley. After this hire, the general demeanor of the citizens toward the zoo has been more positive.

== Exhibits ==
=== Kansas Carnivores ===
Kansas Carnivores, opened in 2009, features cougars and river otters in side-by-side exhibits. Following the deaths of the zoo's last Mountain Lion, the exhibit has been torn down to create the new exhibit known as Tiger Trails and Den Academy.

=== Hill's Black Bear Woods ===
Hill's Black Bear Woods was built in 1997, and features animals from North America. Units house Virginia opossum, eastern screech owl, and red-tailed hawk. Living in tall flight pens are golden eagles and eagle-owls. An exhibit nearby is home to pronghorns and wild turkeys. American black bears live in a spacious enclosure with trees to climb. They can be viewed from an elevated walkway, or a ground level window.

=== Waterbird Lagoon ===
Waterbird Lagoon features three ponds. Waterfowl such as trumpeter swans live in these ponds. Many wild waterfowl visit these ponds such as mallard ducks, wood ducks, and herons.

=== Jungle Cats ===
The Jungle Cats exhibit features rare Sumatran tigers in thickly planted, side-by-side exhibits (one was previously home to a black-coated leopard). Both yards have water features. 3 Sumatran tigers cubs were born in May 2014. The Sumatran Tigers will be moved to the new Tiger Trails and Den Academy exhibit sometime in 2026.

=== Tropical Rainforest ===
The Tropical Rainforest was the first indoor rainforest exhibit in the United States. Birds, such as scarlet macaws, Bali mynah, roseate spoonbills, and scarlet ibis, are free roaming, as well as Hoffmann's two-toed sloths, and Indian flying foxes. Individual exhibits house golden lion tamarins, yellow-spotted river turtle, red-footed tortoises, and greater mouse-deer.

=== Animals and Man ===
The Animals and Man building features exhibits for small animals, formerly animals such as black-and-white ruffed lemurs and Cape porcupines. This building also house a male hippopotamus named Vision and a single elderly female African bush elephant named Tembo, who was born in 1970. The zoo previously had three other elephants, another African Elephant, Shannon, who died in 2017 and a pair of Asian elephants, Sunda and Cora, who died in 2018 and 2025 respectively. Both the elephant and the hippo also have large outdoor yards. The zoo says Elephants won't be brought back once Tembo passes and the current master plan calls for Rhinoceroses to take their place. The elephant Cora passed away in October 2025, just 4 months after fans of the Burt Reynolds film Smokey and the Bandit II visited her on the annual "Bandit Run" event because she starred as Charlotte the Elephant in the film.

=== Camp Cowabunga ===
Formerly Lion's Pride, this exhibit has two lions in a spacious exhibit, a Cheetah in an adjoining yard, and patas monkeys in an exhibit spanning the entrance to Camp Cowabunga, mixed with Kirk's dik-dik, African spurred tortoises, and helmeted guineafowl. The main feature is a central plaza where guests can view various artefacts from Africa, sit in a canoe used in the Zambezi, and view the animals from safari tents. This area has an adjoining viewing platform into the Giraffe yard of the Giraffe and Friends exhibit. The zoo's lioness, Asante, is the oldest lioness in the AZA population.

=== Lianas Forest ===
In the Lianas Forest (formerly Discovering Apes) building, Bornean orangutans live behind glass in an enclosure replicating the treetops in Borneo. They also have a spacious outdoor yard, meant to emulate Camp Leakey. The Treetop Conservation Center is now part of the building. When Discovering Apes phase II (Western Lowland Gorillas) opened, it was the first 360° glass viewing tunnel for Gorillas in North America.

=== Children's Zoo ===
The Children's Zoo was added in 1992, and has domestic animals, such as sheep and goats to feed. There is a playground next to the Children's Zoo.

=== Adventure Trail ===
Adventure Trail was added in 2015 and includes many family friendly experiences. The rainbow lorikeet aviary houses several colorful lorikeets that you can feed for a fee. A playground includes many climbing structures, a place to ride tricycles, and a mining sluice. The general store in this area also serves as a point to purchase snacks and refreshments.

=== Kay's Garden ===
An exhibit recreating a traditional Japanese garden with a koi pond, honoring Kansas Chief Justice Kay McFarland, opened in 2020.

=== Giraffe and Friends ===
Giraffe and Friends was added in 2022, and is a new habitat for giraffes, lesser kudu, ostriches, and other species. The new habitat has barns for their giraffes, with a training room, a giraffe playroom, and an indoor and outdoor platform for guests to feed the giraffes.

== Notable births ==
- Golden Eagle, 1971 - the first golden eagles born in captivity
- Reticulated Giraffe, Hope, 2010
- Reticulated Giraffe, Sunflower, 1971 - the first Giraffe born in Kansas
- Common Hippopotamus, Vision (Tank), 2010
- Three Banded Armadillo, 2010, 2011, 2015
- Bornean Orangutan, Bumi, 2013
- Golden Lion Tamarin, 2013, 2014, 2015, 2025
- 3 Sumatran Tigers, Raza, Shanti, and ChloJo, 2014
- Hoffmann's 2-Toed Sloth, 2014, 2015 – They have a history of successfully breeding sloths
- Greater Malayan Chevrotain, 2014, 2015 – One of 9 AZA zoos in the US to house this species in 2015.
- Giraffe, Konza, 2018
- Bornean Orangutan, Udara, 2022
- Greater Malayan Chevrotain, 2023

== Awards ==
- Edward H. Bean Award, 1972

== Incidents ==
One orangutan died in 2003 of tularemia, an infectious disease carried by rabbits and some rodents but sometimes found in humans and primates. A dead rabbit was found outside of their enclosure and officials think all three primates handled the rabbit before the five orangutans took ill. In reaction, the zoo has installed a rabbit-proof fence around the orangutan area.

On May 6, 2010, a bobcat in the zoo escaped its cage after a vandal apparently pried the animal's cage open. The bobcat was found several hours later in some bushes not far from its cage, and was tranquilized and returned to its cage without further incident.

On April 20, 2019, a Sumatran tiger injured its keeper in its exhibit, causing the keeper to need surgery.

In April 2024, Karen, an ostrich at the zoo, died after swallowing a set of keys from a zookeeper. Attempts were made to save her, but were unsuccessful. Karen lived in the Giraffe and Friends habitat before her death.
