= Oakland, Kansas =

Neighborhood in Topeka, Kansas, United States

Oakland is a neighborhood located in northeastern Topeka, Kansas. Approximately 5,610 people live in Oakland today.

== History ==
Founded by J. B. Bartholomew and John Norton in 1886, Oakland was incorporated as a city of 3rd class in 1903.

Migrants from Mexico began to arrive in what was then the Santa Fe Railroad yard near Topeka in the early 1900’s, seeking to escape poverty and the political turmoil that followed the Mexican Revolution came to the United States to work for the railroads. In addition to work opportunities, the yard's proximity to Kansas City made it attractive, as it too had attracted a large Mexican community. The area became a "Little Mexico" neighborhood known as “La Yarda.”

Notable former residents include early settlers Charles Sardou and Gilbert Billard. In the late 1890s, Sardou and Billard immigrated from France to the US and upon hearing about the opening up of the Kansas Territory, traveled to Kansas and settled in Oakland. Today, their original homes still stand, although nearly completely altered. The Billard home is located at the base of the Sardou Bridge, inside of the cloverleaf. The Sardou home is located on the northeast corner of Grattan and Laurent.

In 1925, residents of Oakland voted 505-206 to be annexed by the City of Topeka. On October 25, 1926 the City of Oakland ceased to exist and became part of the City of Topeka.

Each year, thousands of people attend Fiesta Topeka, a five-day festival with food, dancing, entertainment and carnival rides with money going to support the Our Lady of Guadalupe Church located in Oakland. The neighborhood also hosts the yearly Germanfest with proceeds going to support Sacred Heart - St. Joseph Catholic Parish, also located in Oakland.
