= Sardou Bridge =

- Coordinates: 39.0672°N 95.6510°W
- Carries: 2 lanes of Sardou Ave.
- Crosses: Kansas River
- Locale: Topeka, Kansas

Characteristics
- Design: Unknown

History
- Opened: 1961 (current span)

The Sardou Bridge is an automobile crossing of the Kansas River at Topeka, Kansas.

== History ==
The Sardou Bridge was built in 1899. It was named after Freeman Sardou, an early developer of the Oakland area. The first span of the bridge was destroyed by the 1903 flood, and its replacement washed away in the Great Flood of 1951. The current span opened in 1961, with the opening ceremony ribbon cut by Sardou's great-great-grandson George Robert Sardou.

== Description ==
The bridge carries two lanes, one east, one west, over the river, and its banks. It is on the outer eastern part of the city. On the north side, it leads to NE Morse Avenue, and on the south to NE Sardou Avenue. The bridge connects the North Topeka and Oakland communities.
