= Reinisch Rose Garden and Doran Rock Garden =

Gardens in Topeka, Kansas, United States

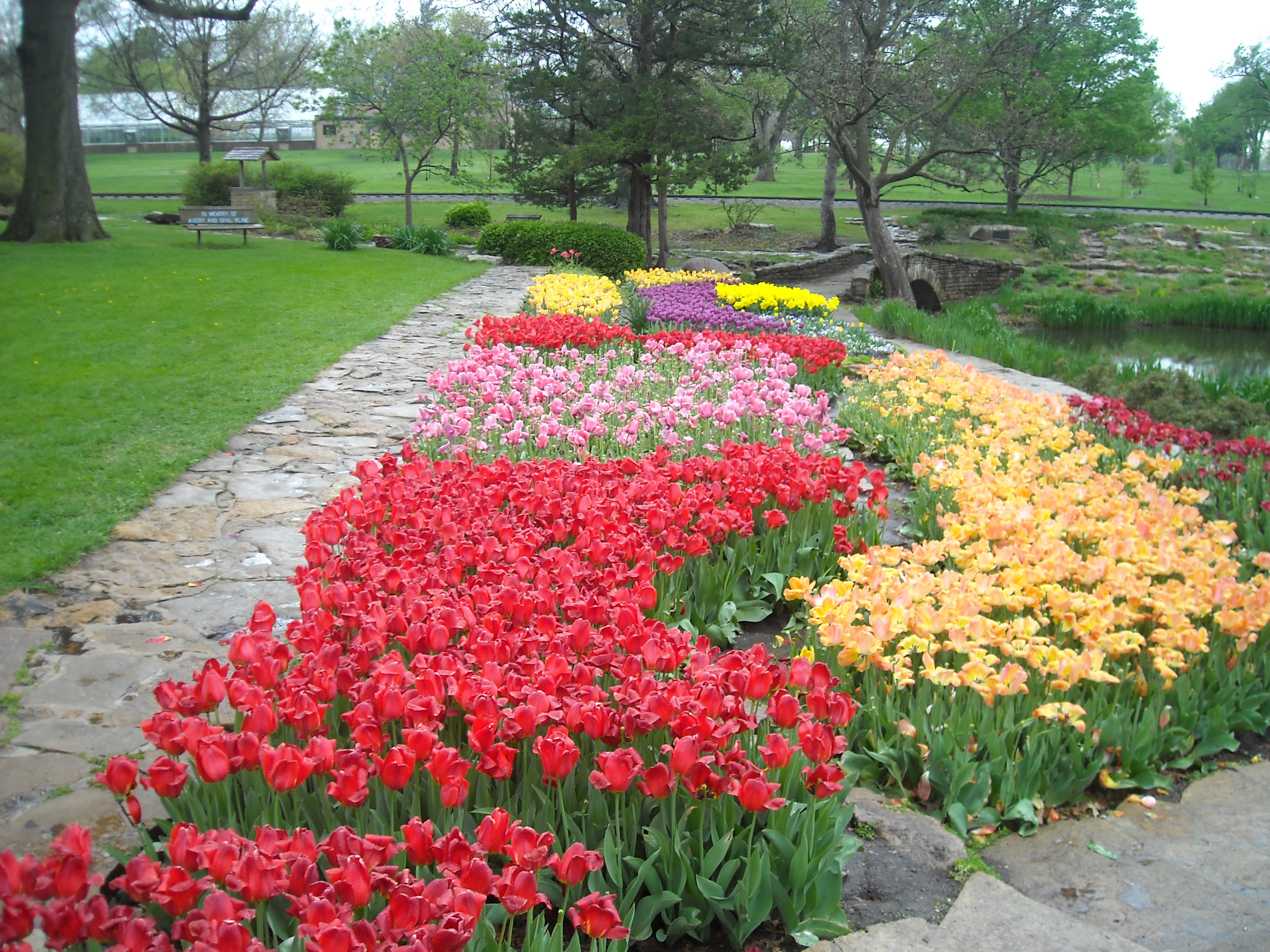
- The Reinisch Rose Garden
- Interactive map of Reinisch Rose Garden and Doran Rock Garden
- Coordinates: 39.0544°N 95.7307°W
- Website: Official website

The Reinisch Rose Garden and Doran Rock Garden are gardens located in Gage Park, at 4320 SW 10th Avenue, Topeka, Kansas.

== History ==
The rose garden was designed by Chicago landscape architect Emmett Hill and landscape gardener L. R. Quinlan. The rose garden was initially planned by landscape architect and horticulturist E. F. A. Reinisch in 1926. Following his death in 1929, the garden was developed by the Topeka Horticulture Society, and opened in June 1930. The Doran Rock Garden was completed in 1932.

== Description ==
The Reinisch garden features 400 varieties of roses with over 6,500 plants. It is one of 23 test gardens in the United States for hybridizers, and officially designated for its All-America Rose Selections. Peak blooming times are late May into early June, and early to mid-September. Adjacent is the Logan Test Garden, and the Doran Rock Garden, which is a naturalistic rock garden containing a reflecting pool with a stone pedestrian bridge and cypresses, Japanese maples, willow oaks and flowering annuals.

== In popular culture ==
The Reinisch garden is mentioned in the 1997 Stephen King novel Wizard and Glass: "A sign just inside the arch proclaimed this to be the Reinisch Rose Garden, and there were roses, all right; roses everywhere."

== See also ==
- List of botanical gardens in the United States
