= Flag of Topeka =

Topeka

The flag of Topeka is the vexillology symbol representing the American city of Topeka, in Kansas. It was designed by the Topeka young professionals organization, Forge in 2018 and adopted in 2019 replacing a 1977 design created by a local boy scout group.

In the 2022 North American Vexillological Association survey, the flag received an A grade and was rated in the top 25 of over 300 flags.

== Design ==
=== 1977 flag ===
The gold on the flag was reflective of the city’s nickname, “The Golden City”. The dark green represented how the fertility of Kaw Valley and corn and their importance as an agricultural product of the region. On the seal, which remains the seal of Topeka, is written on the chief is written "Golden City" which is the city's nickname. On the dexter is a Kaw house that evokes the presence of the Kaw people in the region. On both sides of the house is an arrow and stalk of corn which represents the fact that Kaw were hunters as well as farmers. At the base is the Capitol symbolizing Topeka being the capital of Kansas. The band that divides the shield represents the bridge connecting North Topeka to Topeka. The nine stars on said band evokes the nine founders of the city.

=== Current flag ===
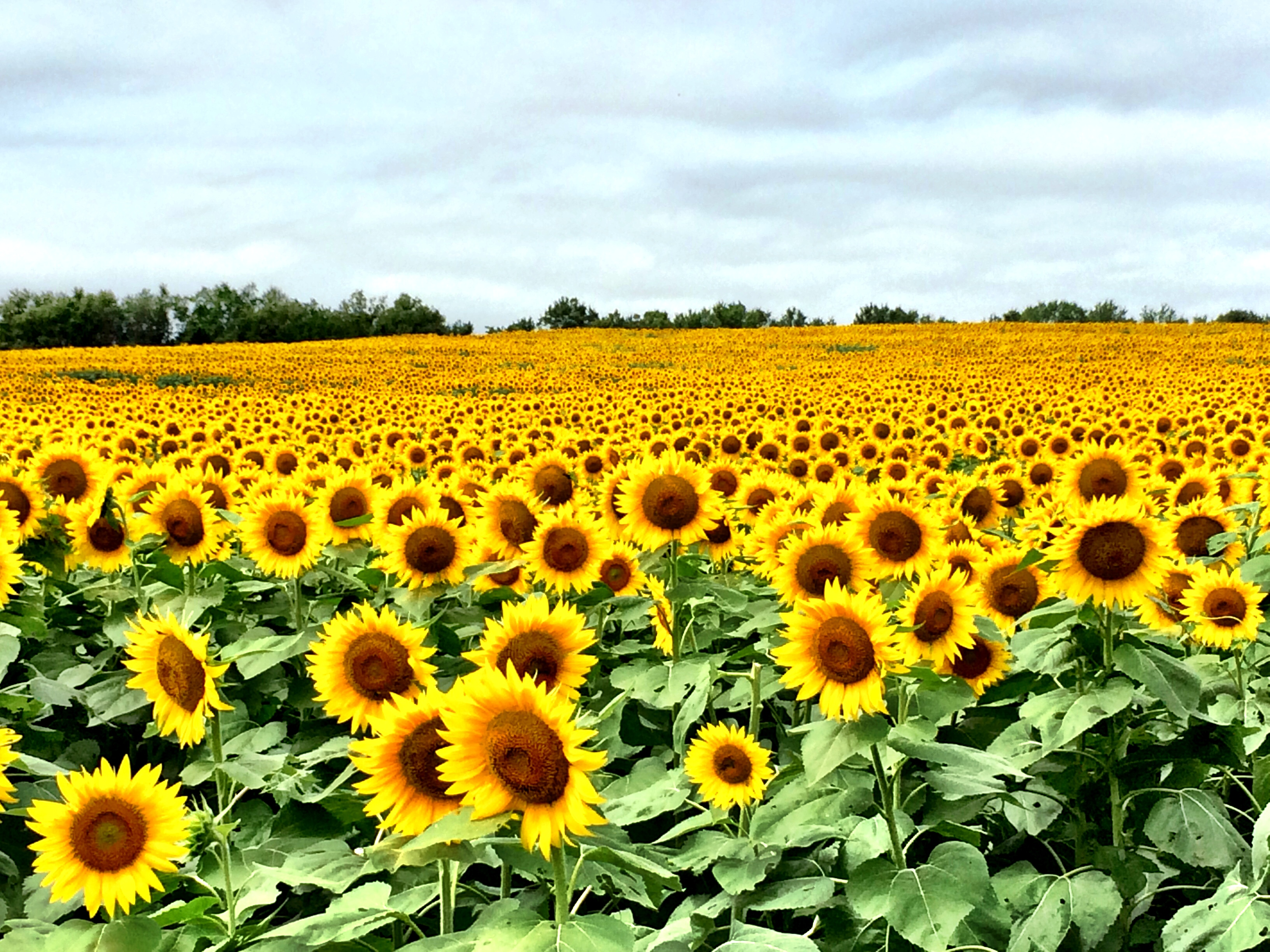
Flowers in Kansas reflecting the state's nickname.

The sunflower signifies Topeka as the capital city of Kansas nicknamed the "Sunflower State". Its nine petals symbolize the nine founders of the city. The star in the right corner represents where Topeka is geographically located and its status as capital of Kansas (stars often represent capital cities on maps). The green arrow on the sunflower pointing to the star also evokes the statue at the top of the Kansas State Capitol pointing to a star. It also gives a nod to Kansas' motto, “to the stars through difficulties."

== History ==
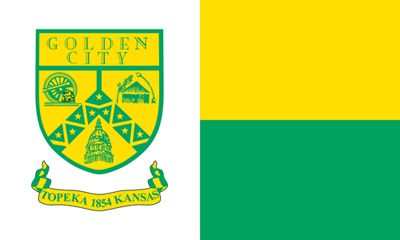
1977–2019

=== Proposed flags 1895 ===
In 1895, The Topeka state journal ran an article proposing flags for the city. Editors from the Newspaper sent in 3 suggestions but none were every adopted.

=== 1977 flag ===
The previous flag design comprised the Topeka city seal on the left and a horizontal bicolour of yellow and green and was designed in 1977 by a local boy scout group. At the request of the U.S. Navy, Topeka city officials in the early 1960s arranged for the creation of what was intended to be an official city flag. The flag was then displayed on a naval light cruiser, the USS Topeka. In 1975, members of the boy Scout Troop 43 were looking for a bicentennial community project when then Mayor Bill McCormick encouraged them to work on a city flag. The council approved their design in 1977, which had the city crest. In the 2004 North American Vexillological Association survey, it was rated 46 out of the 150 flags and received a 4.76 score.

=== Current flag ===
In July 2018, the Topeka young professionals organization, Forge, started the Topeka flag redesign initiative, aiming to improve on the former flag. Three finalists were selected for a final ballot which attracted nearly 4,000 votes. The sunflower flag design gained 70 percent of the vote, according to the Greater Topeka Partnership, and it became the official flag of Topeka on November 12th, 2019. Since then, the flag received an A grade and was rated in the top 25 of over 300 flags in the 2022 North American Vexillological Association survey.

== Use ==
The flag is present in front of the city hall since 2019, replacing the old banner. The flag is also visible on the newly unveiled Topeka license plates designed by Forge, the same organization who created the city banner. The license plate, however, has not yet been produced by the state of Kansas.
