= Kansas Children's Discovery Center =

Children's museum in Topeka, Kansas, USA

Coordinates: 39.05211°N 95.73352°W

The Kansas Children's Discovery Center is a nonprofit children's museum for children and families to explore and discover science, art, engineering, and nature together. The Discovery Center is located in Topeka's treasured Gage Park at 4400 SW 10th Ave Topeka, Kansas.
