= Gage Park, Topeka =

Park in Kansas, United States

Gage Park
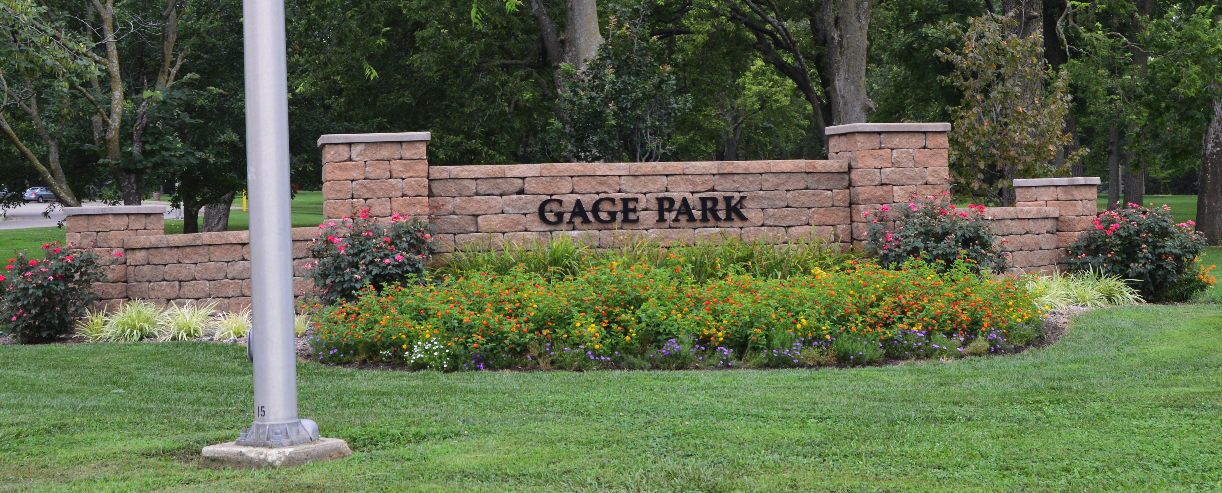

- Location within Kansas
- Location: Shawnee, Kansas, United States
- Coordinates: 39°3′16.84″N 95°43′47.28″W

Gage Park is a city park of 164 acres (0.66 km^{2}) in Topeka, Kansas, United States. It was established in 1899 and is one of the largest parks in Topeka. It features the Topeka Zoo, the Kansas Children's Discovery Center, a miniature train of 15 in (381 mm) gauge, the Helen Hocker Theater, the Blaisdell family aquatic center, and the Reinisch Rose Garden. The 70-year-old rose garden is a popular place for weddings and events, and also a place where serious horticultural work is done.

== History ==
Gage Park was established in 1899 when the heirs of Guilford Gage donated their farm to the city of Topeka as a recreational center. George Kessler prepared the first plan between 1899 and 1901, city horticulturist Anton Reinisch continuing the work. The zoo and Doran Rock Garden were both constructed in the 1930s. Animaland followed in 1960 – a playground with concrete animals for climbing.

Fred Phelps and the Westboro Baptist Church began their anti-gay crusade in 1991 with what they called "The Great Gage Park Decency Drive", seeking a crack down on homosexuals cruising for sex in the park. At the time, the church circulated a flyer, "Gage Park Sodomite Rats Nest".

== In popular culture ==
Gage Park was featured in the beginning of the 1997 Stephen King novel The Dark Tower IV: Wizard and Glass, with Reinisch garden, the zoo, and the train being mentioned. In the book, the city of Topeka is deserted due to the influenza of King's novel The Stand.
