= Topeka, Kansas =

State capital city of Kansas, United States

- State capital city
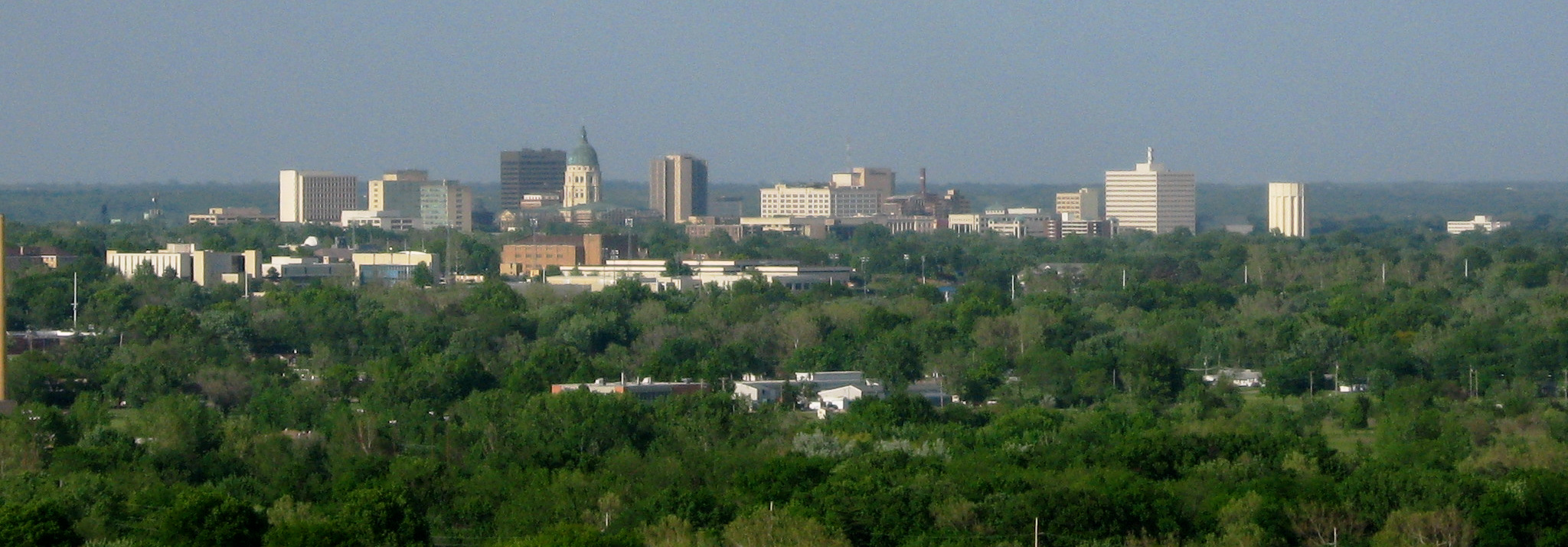
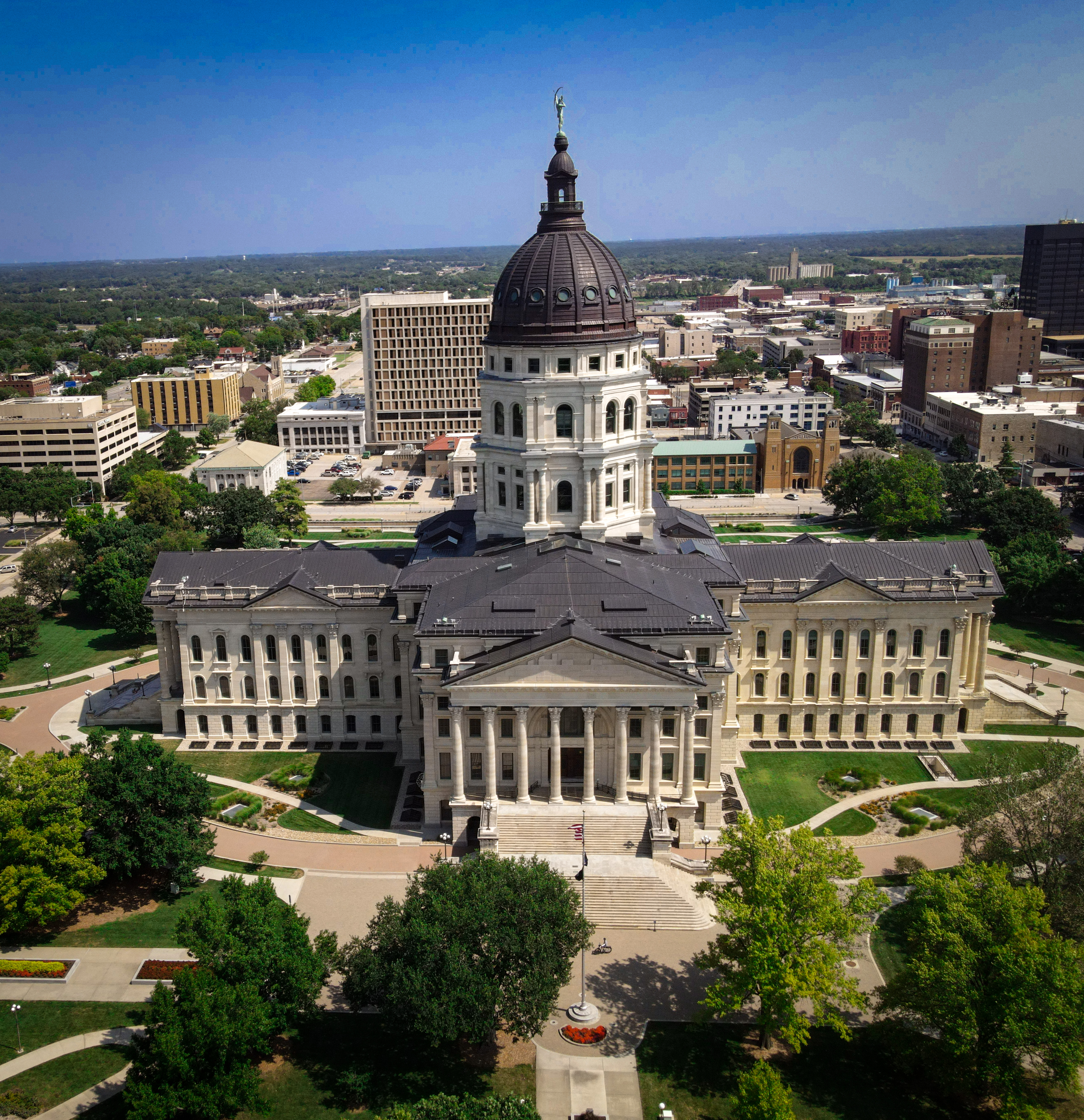
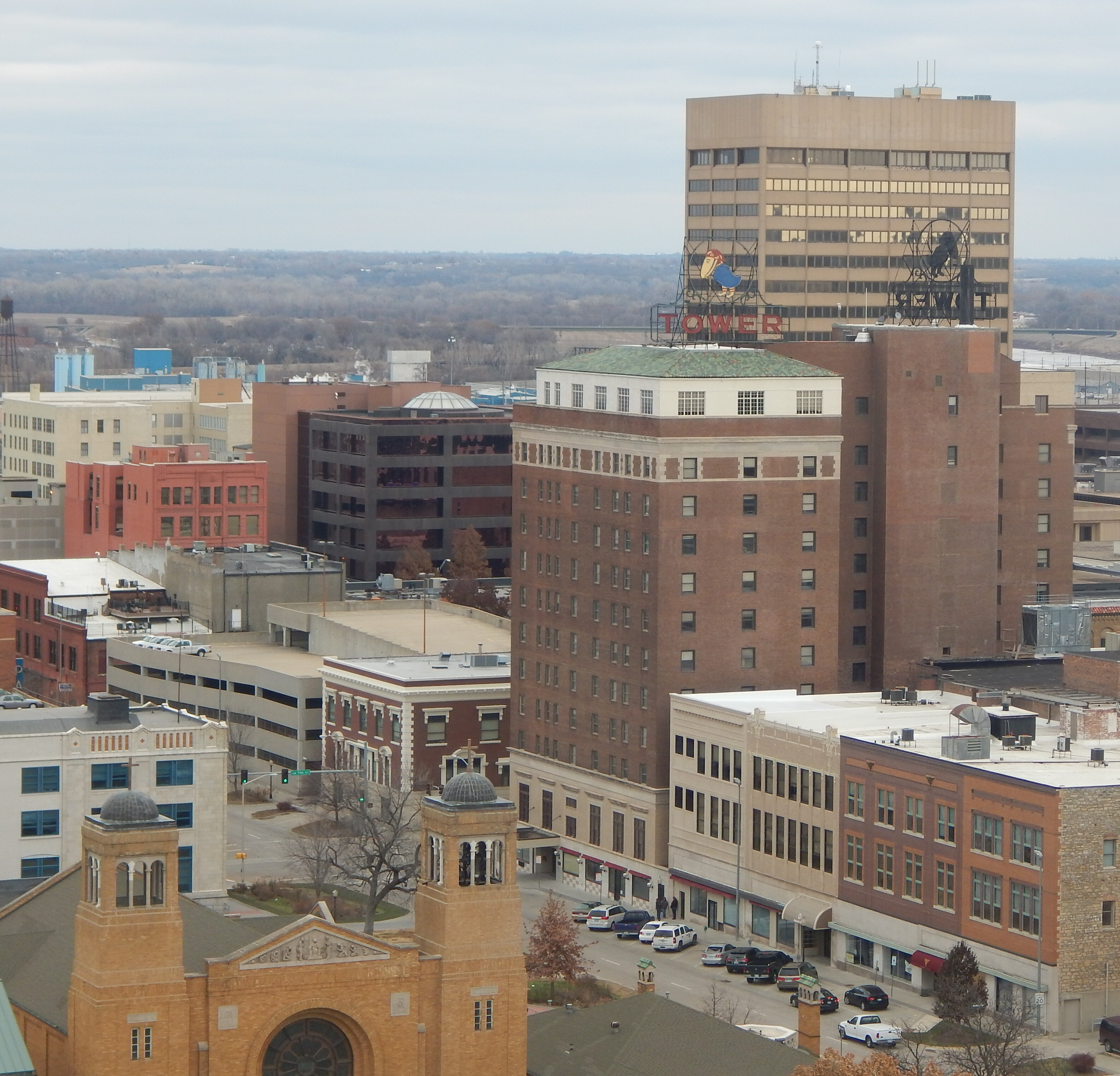
- Downtown skyline from Burnett's Mound Kansas State Capitol Downtown Topeka

- Flag Seal

- Location within Shawnee County and Kansas
- Interactive map of Topeka, Kansas
- Coordinates: 39°02′05″N 95°41′44″W
- Country: United States
- State: Kansas
- County: Shawnee
- Founded: 1854
- Incorporated: 1857

Government
  - Type: Council–manager
  - Mayor: Spencer Duncan
  - City Manager: Robert Perez

Area
  - State capital city: 62.75 sq mi (162.53 km^{2})
  - Land: 61.44 sq mi (159.14 km^{2})
  - Water: 1.31 sq mi (3.39 km^{2})
- Elevation: 938 ft (286 m)

Population (2020)
  - State capital city: 126,587
  - Estimate (2024): 125,467
  - Rank: US: 222nd KS: 5th
  - Density: 2,060.2/sq mi (795.44/km^{2})
  - Urban: 150,003 (US: 217th)
  - Metro: 232,670 (US: 200th)
- Demonym: Topekan
- Time zone: UTC−6 (CST)
  - Summer (DST): UTC−5 (CDT)
- ZIP Codes: 66601–66612, 66614–66622, 66624–66626, 66628–66629, 66636–66637, 66642, 66647, 66652–66653, 66667, 66675, 66683, 66692, 66699
- Area code: 785
- FIPS code: 20-71000
- GNIS ID: 485655
- Website: topeka.gov

Topeka (/tə.ˈpiː.kə/, tə-PEE-kə) is the capital city of the U.S. state of Kansas and the county seat of Shawnee County. It is along the Kansas River in the central part of Shawnee County, within northeastern Kansas and the Central United States. The population of the city was 126,587 as of the 2020 census. The five-county Topeka metropolitan area has approximately 233,000 residents.

The city, laid out in 1854, was one of the Free-State towns founded by Eastern antislavery men immediately after the passage of the Kansas–Nebraska Bill. Topeka was chartered as a city in 1857. It is well known for the landmark U.S. Supreme Court case Brown v. Board of Education of Topeka, which overturned Plessy v. Ferguson and declared racial segregation in public schools to be unconstitutional.

== History ==
=== Name ===
The name "Topeka" is a Kansa-Osage word that means "place where we dig potatoes", or "a good place to dig potatoes". As a placename, Topeka was first recorded in 1826 as the Kansa name for the Kansas River. Topeka's founders chose the name in 1855 because it "was novel, of Indian origin, and euphonious of sound". Mixed-heritage Kansa Native American Joseph James, called Jojim, is credited with suggesting Topeka's name.

=== Early history ===
For many millennia, Native Americans inhabited the Great Plains of North America. From the 16th to the mid-18th centuries, the Kingdom of France laid claim to large parts of North America. In 1762, late in the French and Indian War, France secretly ceded Louisiana west of the Mississippi River to Spain in the Treaty of Fontainebleau. In 1800, Spain returned Louisiana to France. In 1803, the United States purchased the territory, which included most of the land of modern Kansas, from France for $15 million (~$391 million in 2025).

=== 19th century ===
In the 1840s, wagon trains made their way west from Independence, Missouri, on a journey of 2,000 miles (3,000 km), following what came to be known as the Oregon Trail. About 60 miles (97 km) west of Kansas City, Missouri, three half-Kansas Indian sisters married to the French-Canadian Pappan brothers established a ferry service allowing travelers to cross the Kansas River at what became Topeka. During the 1840s and into the 1850s, travelers could reliably find a way across the river, but little else was in the area.

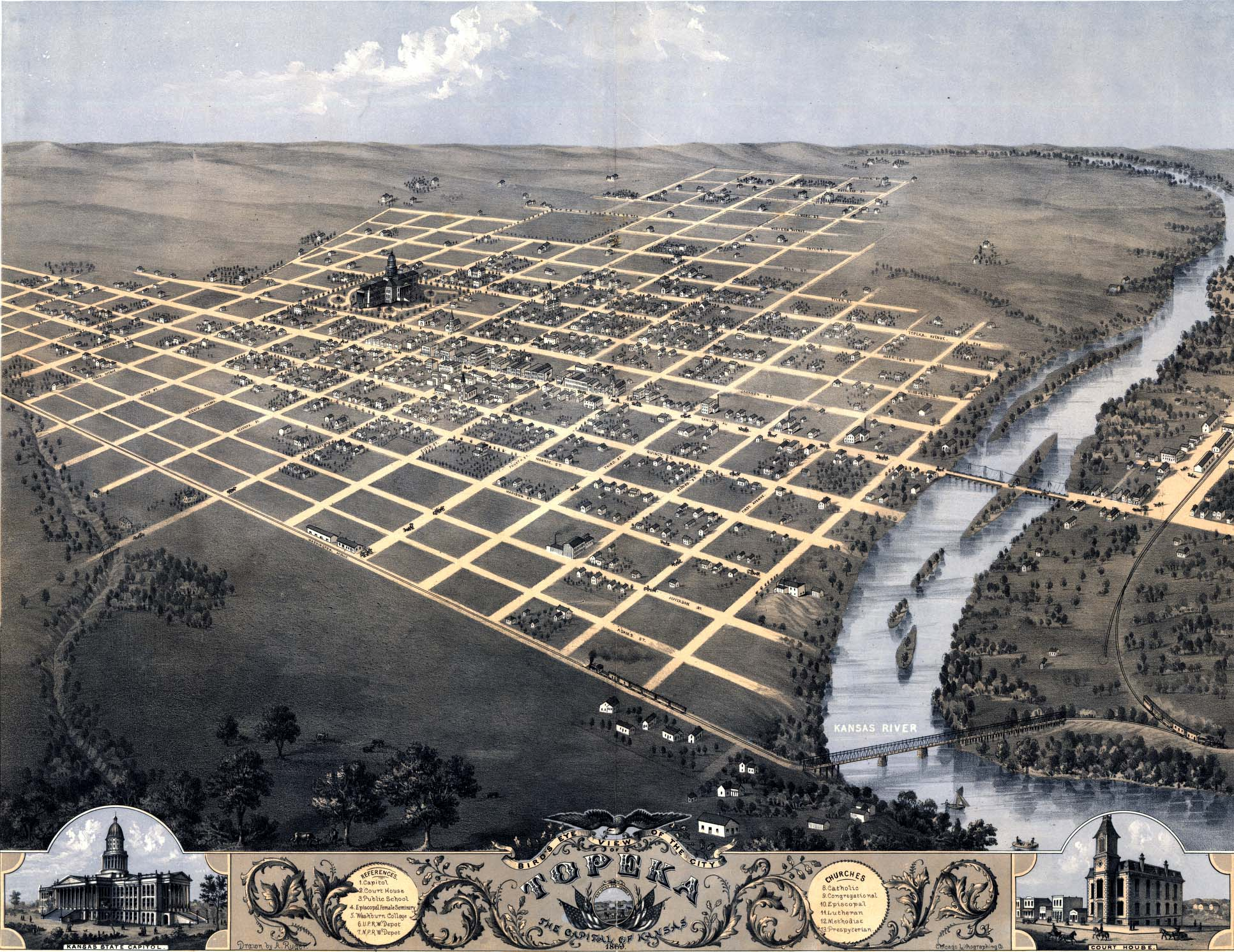
An 1869 bird's-eye illustration of Topeka

In the early 1850s, traffic along the Oregon Trail was joined by trade on a new military road stretching from Fort Leavenworth through Topeka to the newly established Fort Riley. In 1854, after completion of the first cabin, nine men established the Topeka Town Association. The group included Cyrus K. Holliday, an "idea man", who became mayor of Topeka and founder of the Atchison, Topeka & Santa Fe Railroad. Soon, steamboats were regularly docking at the Topeka landing, depositing meat, lumber, and flour and returning eastward with potatoes, corn, and wheat. By the late 1860s, Topeka had become a commercial hub that offered many Victorian era comforts.

Topeka was a bastion for the free-state movement during the problems in Kansas Territory between abolitionist and pro-slavery settlers (the latter of whom controlled the legal government based out of Lecompton). After southern forces barricaded Topeka in 1856, Topeka's leaders took actions to defend the free-state town from invasion. A militia was organized and stone fortifications were built on Quincy Street. The fortifications seemed to consist of low-lying earthwork levies strengthened by the presence of at least one cannon. The militia manned the fortifications until at least September 1856, when the siege around the town was lifted.

After a decade of abolitionist and pro-slavery conflict that gave the territory the nickname Bleeding Kansas, it was admitted to the Union in 1861 as the 34th state. Topeka was chosen as the capital, with Charles Robinson as the first governor. In 1862, Cyrus K. Holliday donated a tract of land to the state for the construction of a state capitol. Construction of the Kansas State Capitol began in 1866. About 37 years were needed to build the capitol, first the east wing, and then the west wing, and finally the central building, using Kansas limestone. In fall 1864, a stockade fort, later named Fort Simple, was built in the intersection of 6th and Kansas Avenues to protect Topeka, should Confederate forces then in Missouri decide to attack the city. It was abandoned by April 1865 and demolished in April 1867.

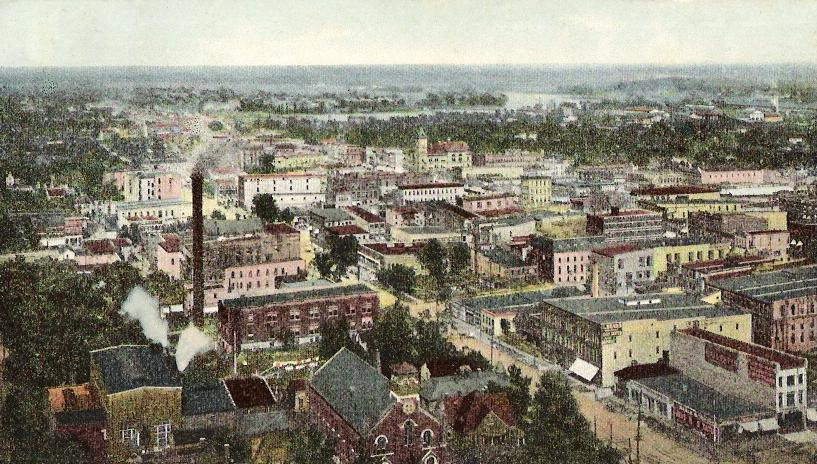
Bird's-eye view in 1909

State officers first used the state capitol in 1869, moving from Constitution Hall, at 427-429 S. Kansas Avenue. Besides being used as the Kansas statehouse from 1863 to 1869, Constitution Hall is the site where antislavery settlers convened in 1855 to write the first of four state constitutions, making it the "Free State Capitol". The National Park Service recognizes Constitution Hall in Topeka as headquarters in the operation of the Lane Trail to Freedom on the Underground Railroad, the chief slave escape passage and free-trade road.

Although the drought of 1860 and the ensuing period of the Civil War slowed the growth of Topeka and the state, Topeka kept pace with the revival and period of growth Kansas enjoyed from the close of the war in 1865 until 1870. In the 1870s, many former slaves, known as Exodusters, settled on the east side of Lincoln Street between Munson and 12th Streets. The area was known as Tennessee Town because so many of them were from the Volunteer State. Charles Sheldon, pastor of the Central Congregational Church, organized the first African American kindergarten west of the Mississippi in 1893.

Lincoln College (later Washburn University), was established in 1865 in Topeka by a charter issued by the State of Kansas and the General Association of Congregational Ministers and Churches of Kansas. In 1869, the railway started moving westward from Topeka, where general offices and machine shops of the Atchison, Topeka & Santa Fe Railroad system were established in 1878.

During the late 1880s, Topeka passed through a boom period that ended in disaster. Vast speculation on town lots occurred. The 1889 bubble burst, and many investors were ruined. Topeka, however, doubled in population during the period, and was able to weather the depressions of the 1890s.

Early in the 20th century, another kind of boom, this time the automobile industry, took off, and numerous pioneering companies appeared and disappeared. Topeka was not left out. The Smith Automobile Company was founded there in 1902, lasting until 1912.

=== 20th century ===
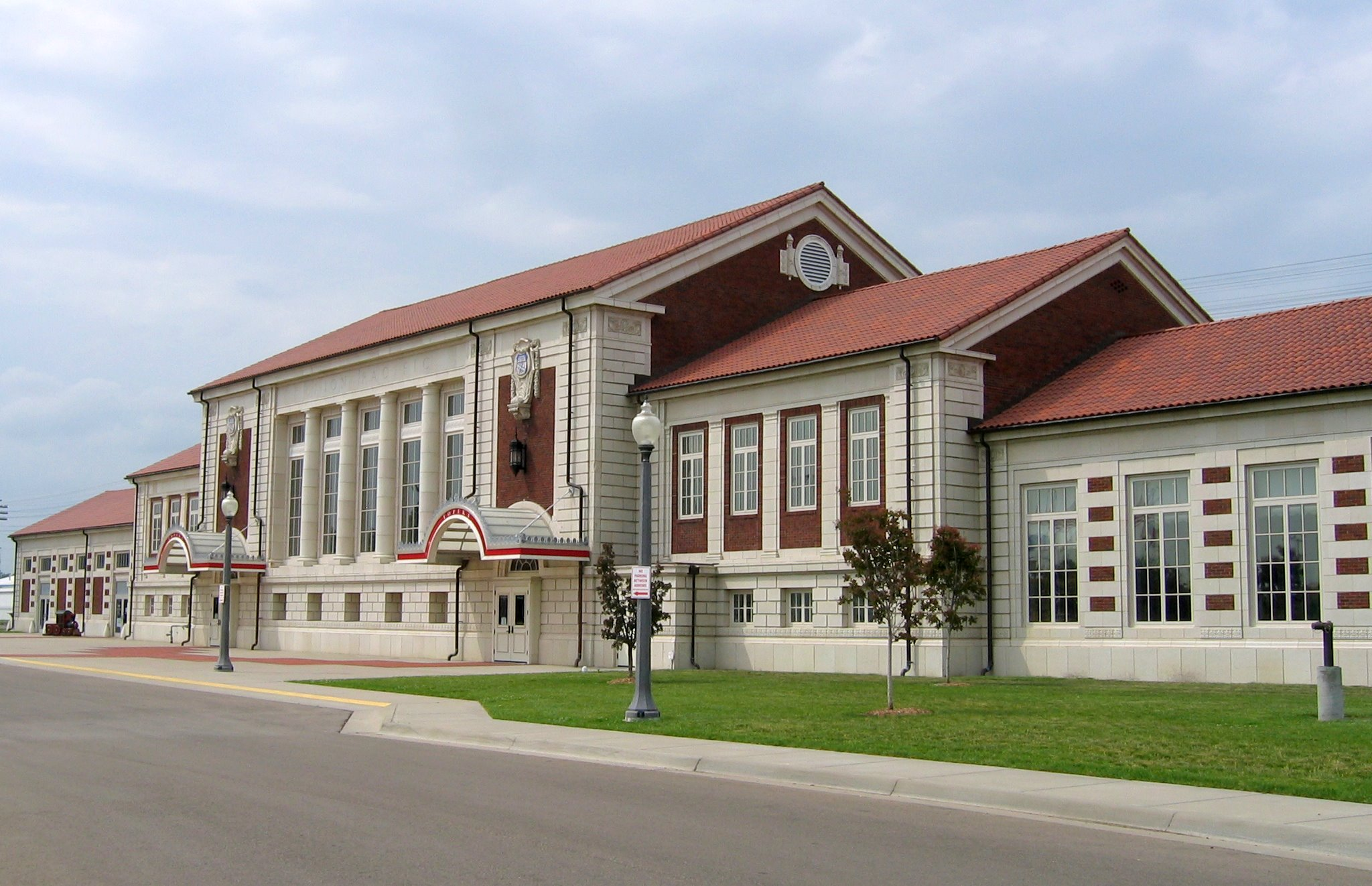
Great Overland Station, a former rail station, opened in 1927

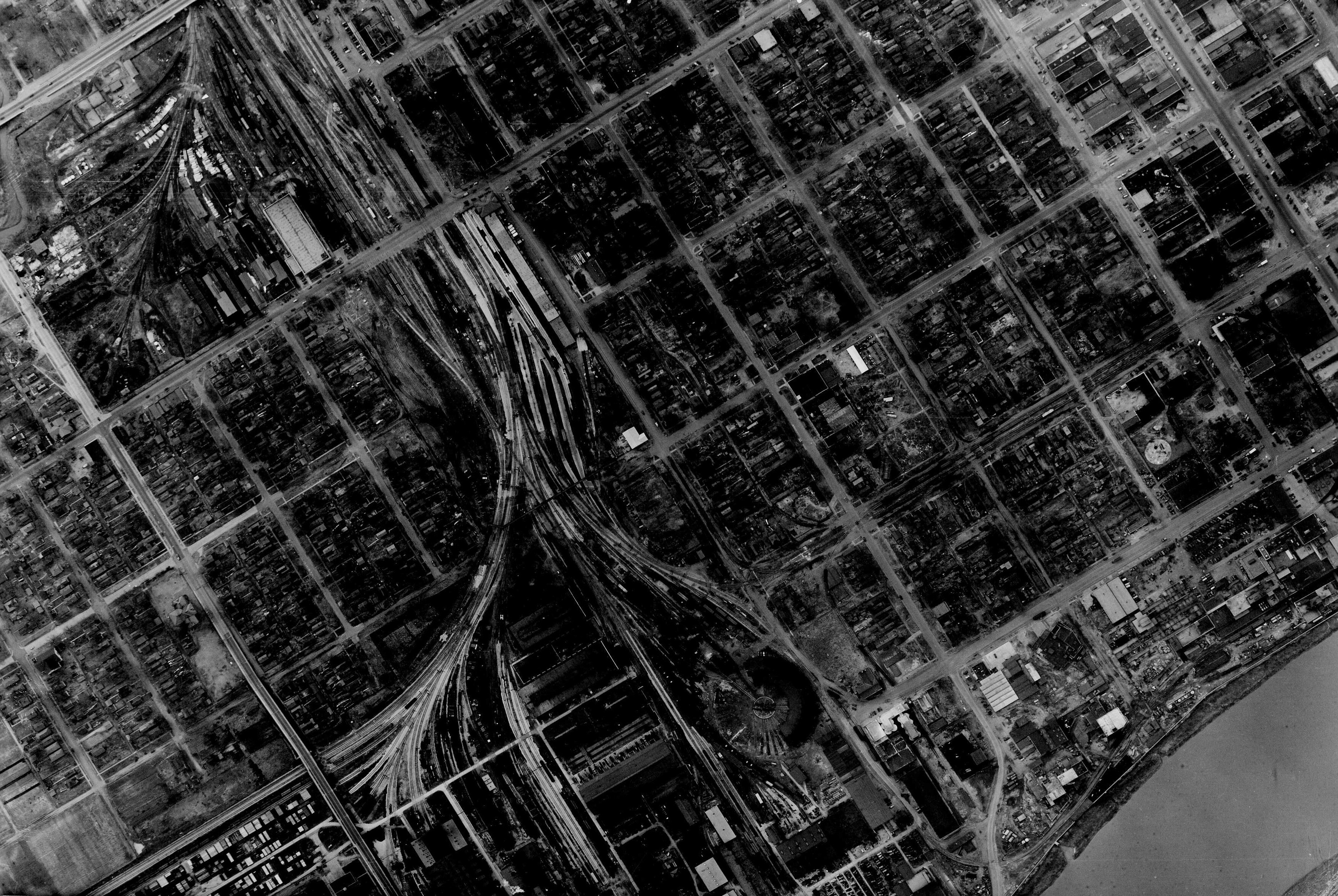
Rail yards in 1944

Home to the first African-American kindergarten west of the Mississippi River, Topeka was the home of Oliver Brown, the named plaintiff in Brown v. Board of Education, which was the case responsible for eliminating the standard of "separate but equal", and requiring racial integration in American public schools. In 1960, the Census Bureau reported Topeka's population as 91.8% White and 7.7% Black.

At the time the suit was filed, only the elementary schools were segregated in Topeka. Topeka High School had been fully integrated since its inception in 1871. Furthermore, Topeka High School was the only public high school in the city of Topeka. Other rural high schools existed, such as Washburn Rural High School—created in 1918—and Seaman High School—created in 1920. Highland Park High School became part of the Topeka school system in 1959 along with the opening of Topeka West High School in 1961. A Catholic high school —Assumption High School, later renamed Capitol Catholic High School, then in 1939 again renamed, to Hayden High School after its founder, Father Francis Hayden — also served the city beginning in 1911.

Monroe Elementary, a segregated school that figured in the historic Brown v. Board of Education decision, through the efforts of the Brown Foundation working with the Kansas Congressional delegation place in the early 1990s, is now Brown v. Board of Education National Historic Site. The Brown Foundation is largely responsible for the content of the interpretive exhibits at the historic site. The National Historic Site was opened by President George W. Bush on May 17, 2004.

Topeka struggled with the burden of racial discrimination even after Brown. New lawsuits attempted unsuccessfully to force suburban school districts surrounding the city to participate in racial integration with the inner-city district. In the late 1980s, a group of citizens calling themselves the Task Force to Overcome Racism in Topeka formed to address the problem in a more organized way.

On June 8, 1966, Topeka was struck by a tornado rated F5 on the Fujita scale. It started on the southwest side of town, moving northeast, passing over a local landmark named Burnett's Mound. According to a local Indian legend, this mound was thought to protect the city from tornadoes if left undisturbed. A few years prior to the tornado strike, development began near the mound, including a water tank constructed near the top of the mound against the warnings of local Native Americans. The tornado went on to rip through the city, hitting the downtown area and Washburn University. Total repair cost was put at $100 million, making it, at the time, one of the most costly tornadoes in American history. Even to this day, with inflation factored in, the Topeka tornado stands as one of the most costly on record. It also helped bring to prominence future CBS and A&E broadcaster Bill Kurtis, who became well known for his televised admonition to "...take cover, for God's sake, take cover!" on WIBW-TV during the tornado. (The city is home of a National Weather Service Forecast Office that serves 23 counties in north-central, northeast, and east-central Kansas).

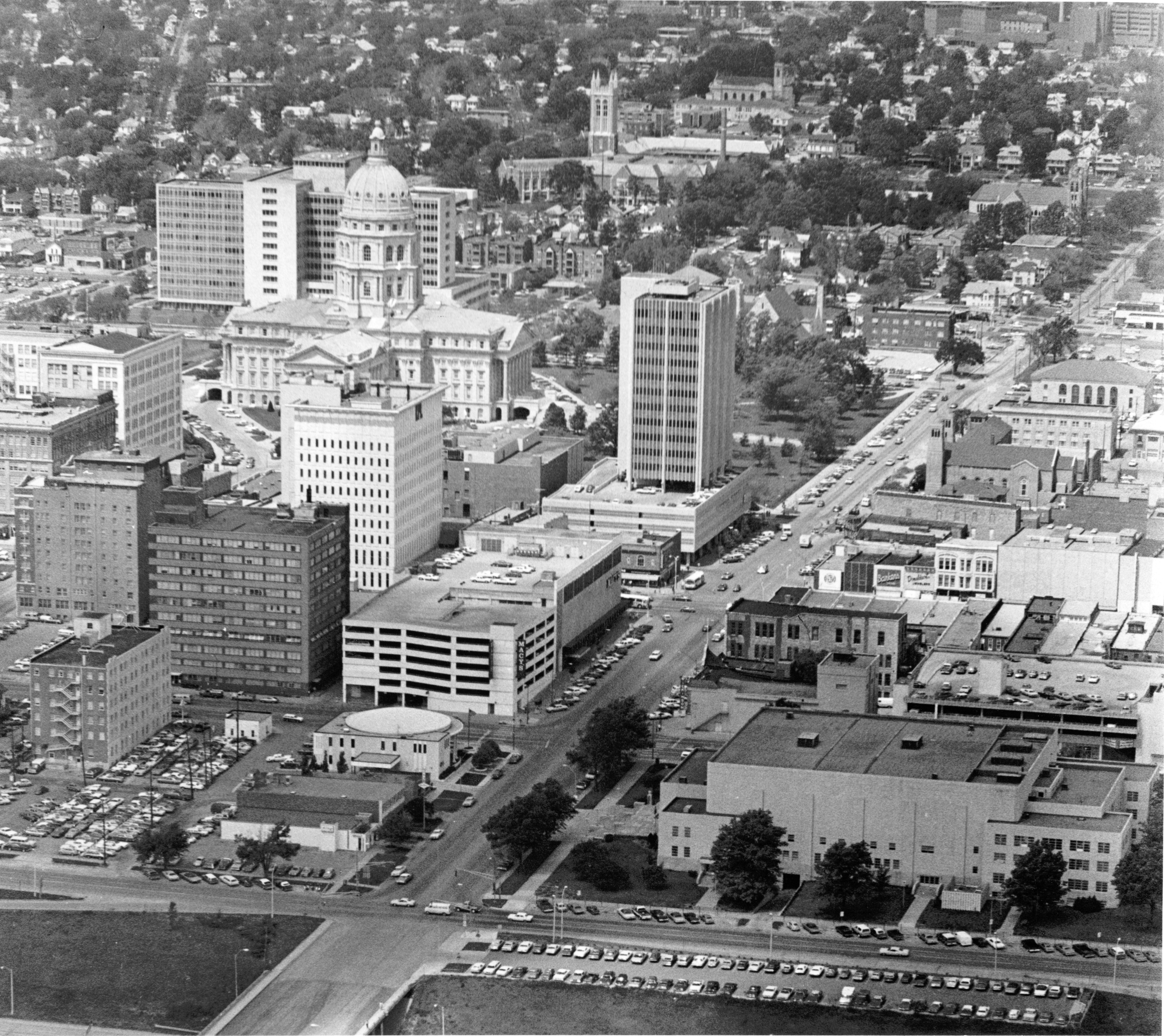
Topeka in 1980

Topeka recovered from the 1966 tornado and has sustained steady economic growth. Washburn University, which lost several historic buildings, received financial support from the community and alumni to rebuild many school facilities. Today, university facilities offer more than one million square feet of modern academic and support space.

In 1974, Forbes Air Force Base closed and more than 10,000 people left Topeka, influencing the city's growth patterns for years to come. During the 1980s, Topeka citizens voted to build a new airport and convention center and to change the form of city government. West Ridge Mall opened in 1988, replacing the White Lakes Mall, which opened in 1964, closed in 2004, and was demolished in 2022.

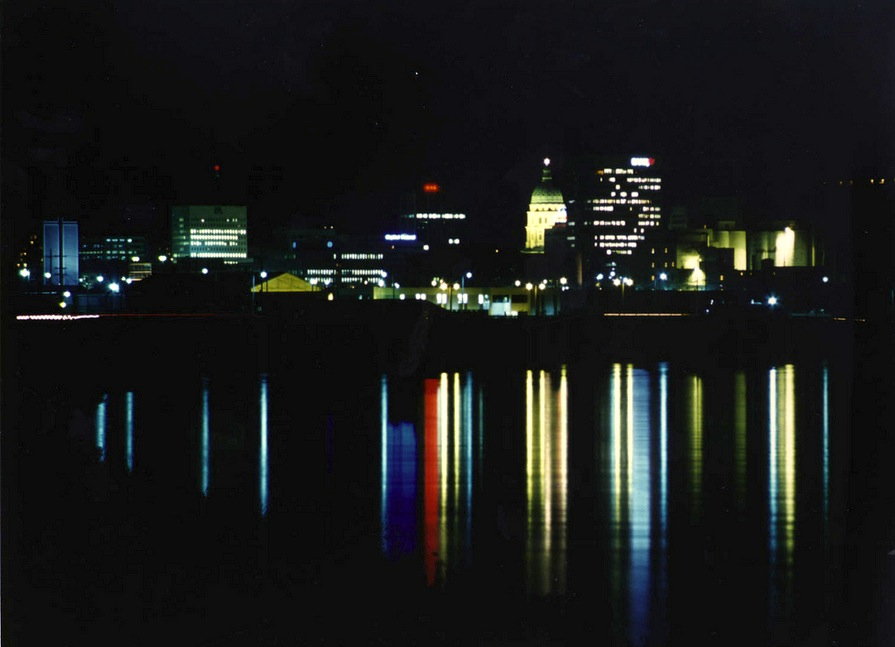
Downtown Topeka skyline at night, seen from the Kansas River (2005)

In 1989, Topeka became a motorsports mecca with the opening of Heartland Park Topeka. The Topeka Performing Arts Center opened in 1991. In the early 1990s, the city experienced business growth with Reser's Fine Foods locating in Topeka and expansions for Santa Fe and Hill's Pet Nutrition.

During the 1990s, voters approved bond issues for public school improvements, including magnet schools, technology, air conditioning, classrooms, and a sports complex. Voters also approved a quarter-cent sales tax for a new law-enforcement center, and in 1996, approved an extension of the sales tax for the East Topeka Interchange connecting the Oakland Expressway, K-4, I-70, and the Kansas Turnpike. During the 1990s, Shawnee County voters approved tax measures to expand the Topeka and Shawnee County Public Library. The Kansas Legislature and governor also approved legislation to replace the majority of the property tax supporting Washburn University with a countywide sales tax.

=== 21st century ===
In 2000, the citizens again voted to extend the quarter-cent sales tax, this time for the economic development of Topeka and Shawnee County. In August, 2004, Shawnee County citizens voted to repeal the 2000 quarter-cent sales tax and replace it with a 12-year, half-cent sales tax designated for economic development, roads, and bridges. Each year, the sales tax provides $5 million designated for business development and job creation incentives, and $9 million for roads and bridges. Planning is under way to continue to redevelop areas along the Kansas River, which runs west to east through Topeka. In the Kansas River Corridor through the center of town, downtown Topeka has experienced apartment and condominium loft development, and façade and streetscape improvements.

==== Google, Kansas ====
On March 1, 2010, Topeka Mayor Bill Bunten issued a proclamation calling for Topeka to be known for the month of March as "Google, Kansas, the capital city of fiber optics". The temporary change came from Ryan Gigous, who wanted to "re-brand" the city with a simple gesture. This was to help "support continuing efforts to bring Google's fiber experiment" to Topeka, though it was not a legal name change. Lawyers advised the city council and mayor against an official name change. Google jokingly announced it would change its name to Topeka to "honor that moving gesture" on April 1, 2010 (April Fools' Day) and changed its home page to say Topeka. In its official blog, Google announced this change affected all of its services as well as its culture, e.g. "Googlers" to "Topekans", "Project Virgle" to "Project Vireka", and proper usage of "Topeka" as an adjective and not a verb, to avoid the trademark becoming genericized.

== Geography ==
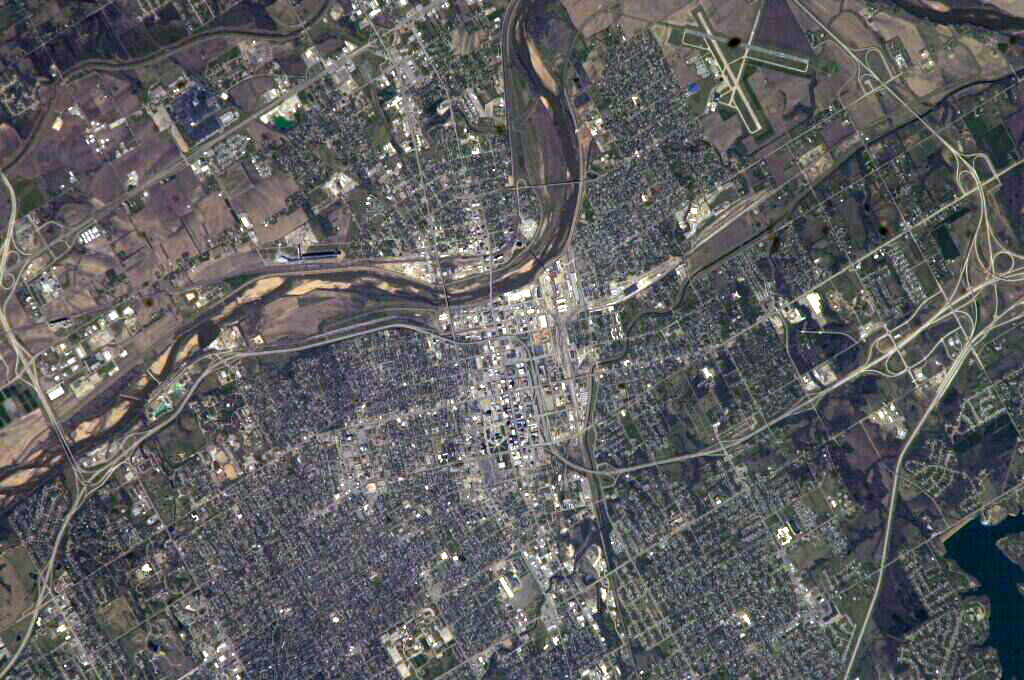
Aerial image of Topeka (2003)

Topeka is in north east Kansas at the intersection of I-70 and U.S. Highway 75. It is the origin of I-335 which is a portion of the Kansas Turnpike running from Topeka to Emporia, Kansas. Topeka is also on U.S. Highway 24 (about 50 miles [80 km] east of Manhattan, Kansas) and U.S. Highway 40 (about 30 miles [48 km] west of Lawrence, Kansas). US 40 is coincident with I-70 west from Topeka. According to the United States Census Bureau, the city has a total area of 61.47 sq mi (159.21 km^{2}), of which 1.30 sq mi (3.37 km^{2}) are covered by water.

=== Climate ===
Topeka has a humid continental climate (Köppen climate classification Dfa, Trewartha climate classification Dcao) or a humid subtropical climate (Köppen Cfa) using the 27 °F (−3 °C) isotherm, with hot, somewhat humid summers and cool to cold, fairly dry winters, and is in USDA plant hardiness zone 6a. Over the course of a year, the monthly daily average temperature ranges from 30.2 °F (−1.0 °C) in January to 79.8 °F (26.6 °C) in July. The maximum temperature reaches 90 °F (32 °C) an average of 49.6 afternoons per year and reaches 100 °F (38 °C) an average of 6.0 afternoons per year. The minimum temperature falls below 0 °F (−18 °C) an average of 2.7 mornings per year, and 21.7 afternoons per year stay below freezing. The average window for freezing temperatures is October 15 through April 17.

The area receives about 36.53 inches (928 mm) of precipitation during a typical year, with the largest share being received in May and June—the April through June period averages 32.8 days of measurable precipitation. Generally, the spring and summer have the most rainfall, with autumn and winter being fairly dry. During a typical year, the total amount of precipitation may vary from 25 to 47 inches (640 to 1,190 mm). Much of the rainfall is delivered by thunderstorms. These can be severe, producing frequent lightning, large hail, and sometimes tornadoes. An average of 100 days of measurable precipitation occur per year. Winter snowfall is light, as is the case in most of the state, as a result of the dry, sunny weather patterns that dominate Kansas winters, which do not allow for sufficient moisture for significant snowfall. Winter snowfall averages 17.1 in (43 cm). Measurable (≥0.1 in or 0.25 cm) snowfall occurs an average of 12 days per year, with at least 1.0 in (2.5 cm) of snow being received on five of those days. Snow depth of at least an inch occurs an average of 17.7 days per year.

Climate data for Topeka, Kansas (Philip Billard Municipal Airport), 1991–2020 normals, extremes 1887–present
| Month | Jan | Feb | Mar | Apr | May | Jun | Jul | Aug | Sep | Oct | Nov | Dec | Year |
|---|---|---|---|---|---|---|---|---|---|---|---|---|---|
| Record high °F (°C) | 78 (26) | 84 (29) | 96 (36) | 97 (36) | 103 (39) | 109 (43) | 114 (46) | 113 (45) | 110 (43) | 97 (36) | 85 (29) | 77 (25) | 114 (46) |
| Mean maximum °F (°C) | 64.3 (17.9) | 70.0 (21.1) | 79.9 (26.6) | 86.2 (30.1) | 90.8 (32.7) | 95.8 (35.4) | 100.7 (38.2) | 100.2 (37.9) | 94.7 (34.8) | 88.1 (31.2) | 75.1 (23.9) | 65.9 (18.8) | 102.3 (39.1) |
| Mean daily maximum °F (°C) | 40.4 (4.7) | 45.7 (7.6) | 57.1 (13.9) | 67.0 (19.4) | 76.4 (24.7) | 85.8 (29.9) | 90.2 (32.3) | 88.9 (31.6) | 81.0 (27.2) | 68.9 (20.5) | 55.2 (12.9) | 43.8 (6.6) | 66.7 (19.3) |
| Daily mean °F (°C) | 30.2 (−1.0) | 34.9 (1.6) | 45.6 (7.6) | 55.5 (13.1) | 65.7 (18.7) | 75.5 (24.2) | 79.8 (26.6) | 77.9 (25.5) | 69.2 (20.7) | 57.0 (13.9) | 44.2 (6.8) | 33.9 (1.1) | 55.8 (13.2) |
| Mean daily minimum °F (°C) | 20.0 (−6.7) | 24.2 (−4.3) | 34.1 (1.2) | 43.9 (6.6) | 55.0 (12.8) | 65.2 (18.4) | 69.3 (20.7) | 66.8 (19.3) | 57.5 (14.2) | 45.1 (7.3) | 33.1 (0.6) | 24.0 (−4.4) | 44.9 (7.1) |
| Mean minimum °F (°C) | −0.1 (−17.8) | 5.2 (−14.9) | 15.1 (−9.4) | 27.5 (−2.5) | 38.8 (3.8) | 52.2 (11.2) | 57.9 (14.4) | 54.8 (12.7) | 41.4 (5.2) | 27.7 (−2.4) | 16.8 (−8.4) | 6.0 (−14.4) | −4.0 (−20.0) |
| Record low °F (°C) | −23 (−31) | −25 (−32) | −7 (−22) | 10 (−12) | 26 (−3) | 36 (2) | 43 (6) | 40 (4) | 29 (−2) | 16 (−9) | −5 (−21) | −26 (−32) | −26 (−32) |
| Average precipitation inches (mm) | 0.89 (23) | 1.31 (33) | 2.25 (57) | 3.81 (97) | 5.17 (131) | 4.92 (125) | 3.99 (101) | 4.55 (116) | 3.52 (89) | 2.85 (72) | 1.78 (45) | 1.49 (38) | 36.53 (927) |
| Average snowfall inches (cm) | 4.6 (12) | 5.2 (13) | 1.7 (4.3) | 0.1 (0.25) | 0.0 (0.0) | 0.0 (0.0) | 0.0 (0.0) | 0.0 (0.0) | 0.0 (0.0) | 0.4 (1.0) | 1.0 (2.5) | 4.1 (10) | 17.1 (43.05) |
| Average precipitation days (≥ 0.01 in) | 5.9 | 6.0 | 8.4 | 10.0 | 11.9 | 10.9 | 8.8 | 8.8 | 7.5 | 7.9 | 6.2 | 5.8 | 98.1 |
| Average snowy days (≥ 0.1 in) | 3.7 | 2.8 | 1.3 | 0.2 | 0.0 | 0.0 | 0.0 | 0.0 | 0.0 | 0.2 | 1.0 | 2.8 | 12.0 |
Source 1: NOAA
Source 2: National Weather Service

== Demographics ==
Historical population
| Census | Pop. | Note | %± |
|---|---|---|---|
| 1860 | 759 | | — |
| 1870 | 5,790 | | 662.8% |
| 1880 | 15,452 | | 166.9% |
| 1890 | 31,007 | | 100.7% |
| 1900 | 33,608 | | 8.4% |
| 1910 | 43,684 | | 30.0% |
| 1920 | 50,022 | | 14.5% |
| 1930 | 64,120 | | 28.2% |
| 1940 | 67,833 | | 5.8% |
| 1950 | 78,791 | | 16.2% |
| 1960 | 119,484 | | 51.6% |
| 1970 | 125,011 | | 4.6% |
| 1980 | 115,266 | | −7.8% |
| 1990 | 119,883 | | 4.0% |
| 2000 | 122,377 | | 2.1% |
| 2010 | 127,473 | | 4.2% |
| 2020 | 126,587 | | −0.7% |
| 2024 (est.) | 125,467 | | −0.9% |
U.S. Decennial Census; 2010-2020

The city is part of the Topeka metropolitan area, which includes Shawnee, Jackson, Jefferson, Osage, and Wabaunsee Counties.

=== 2020 census ===
Topeka, Kansas – racial and ethnic composition Note: the US Census treats Hispanic/Latino as an ethnic category. This table excludes Latinos from the racial categories and assigns them to a separate category. Hispanics/Latinos may be of any race.
| Race / ethnicity (NH = Non-Hispanic) | Pop. 2000 | Pop. 2010 | Pop. 2020 | % 2000 | % 2010 | % 2020 |
|---|---|---|---|---|---|---|
| White alone (NH) | 91,869 | 88,839 | 81,243 | 75.07% | 69.69% | 64.18% |
| Black or African American alone (NH) | 13,941 | 13,775 | 12,574 | 11.39% | 10.81% | 9.93% |
| Native American or Alaska Native alone (NH) | 1,413 | 1,374 | 1,169 | 1.15% | 1.08% | 0.92% |
| Asian alone (NH) | 1,300 | 1,687 | 2,043 | 1.06% | 1.32% | 1.61% |
| Pacific Islander alone (NH) | 43 | 86 | 135 | 0.04% | 0.07% | 0.11% |
| Other race alone (NH) | 160 | 132 | 458 | 0.13% | 0.10% | 0.36% |
| Mixed race or multiracial (NH) | 2,804 | 4,554 | 8,216 | 2.29% | 3.57% | 6.49% |
| Hispanic or Latino (any race) | 10,847 | 17,026 | 20,749 | 8.86% | 13.36% | 16.39% |
| Total | 122,377 | 127,473 | 126,587 | 100.00% | 100.00% | 100.00% |

The 2020 United States census counted 126,587 people, 54,092 households, and 30,361 families in Topeka. The population density was 2,060.3 per square mile (795.4/km^{2}). There were 60,489 housing units at an average density of 984.5 per square mile (380.1/km^{2}).

The U.S. Census accounts for race by two methodologies. "Race alone" and "Race alone less Hispanics" where Hispanics are delineated separately as if a separate race.

The racial makeup (including Hispanics in the racial counts) was 68.44% (86,642) white, 10.44% (13,218) black or African-American, 1.36% (1,723) Native American, 1.64% (2,073) Asian, 0.12% (153) Pacific Islander, 6.09% (7,707) from other races, and 11.91% (15,071) from two or more races.

The racial and ethnic makeup (where Hispanics are excluded from the racial counts and placed in their own category) was 64.18% (81,243) White (non-Hispanic), 9.93% (12,574) Black (non-Hispanic), 0.92% (1,169) Native American (non-Hispanic) or Alaskan Native (non-Hispanic), 1.61% (2,043) Asian (non-Hispanic), 0.11% (135) Pacific Islander (non-Hispanic), 0.36% (458) from other race (non-Hispanic), 6.49% (8,216) Multiracial, and 16.39% (20,749) Hispanic or Latino.

Of the 54,092 households, 24.1% had children under the age of 18; 38.4% were married couples living together; 34.9% had a female householder with no husband present. 37.3% of households consisted of individuals and 15.3% had someone living alone who was 65 years of age or older. The average household size was 2.2 and the average family size was 3.0.

22.7% of the population was under the age of 18, 9.3% from 18 to 24, 25.3% from 25 to 44, 24.0% from 45 to 64, and 18.0% who were 65 years of age or older. The median age was 38.1 years. For every 100 females, the population had 91.0 males. For every 100 females ages 18 and older, there were 87.3 males.

The 2016–2020 5-year American Community Survey estimates show that the median household income was $49,647 (with a margin of error of +/- $1,860) and the median family income $64,454 (+/- $1,541). Males had a median income of $36,601 (+/- $1,727) versus $29,303 (+/- $1,097) for females. The median income for those above 16 years old was $32,634 (+/- $944). Approximately, 9.5% of families and 13.9% of the population were below the poverty line, including 16.7% of those under the age of 18 and 7.8% of those ages 65 or over.

=== 2010 census ===
As of the census of 2010, the city had 127,473 people, 53,943 households, and 30,707 families. The population density was 2,118.5 inhabitants per square mile (818.0/km^{2}). The 59,582 housing units averaged 990.2/sq mi (382.3/km^{2}). The city's racial makeup was 76.2% White, 11.3% African American, 1.4% Native American, 1.3% Asian, 4.8% from other races, and 4.9% from two or more races. Hispanics or Latinos of any race were 13.4% of the population. Non-Hispanic Whites were 69.7% of the population in 2010, down from 86.3% in 1970.

Of the 53,943 households, 29.5% had children under 18 living with them, 37.9% were married couples living together, 14.2% had a female householder with no husband present, 4.8% had a male householder with no wife present, and 43.1% were not families. About 35.9% of all households were made up of individuals, and 12% had someone living alone who was 65 or older. The average household size was 2.29, and the average family size was 2.99.

The city's age distribution was 24.4% under age 18, 9.8% from 18 to 24; 26.1% from 25 to 44, 25.4% from 45 to 64, and 14.3% were 65 or older. The median age in the city was 36 years. The city's gender makeup was 47.8% male and 52.2% female.

=== Crime ===
Topeka
- Crime rates* (2018)

Violent crimes
- Homicide: 24
- Rape: 47
- Robbery: 202
- Aggravated assault: 345
- Total violent crime: 560

Property crimes
- Burglary: 910
- Larceny-theft: 4,308
- Motor vehicle theft: 657
- Arson: 11
- Total property crime: 6,494
- Note: Reported crimes per 100,000 population Source

Although Topeka experienced problems with crime in the 1990s, the city's crime rates have improved since. Overall, crime in Topeka was down nearly 18% in the first half of 2008, compared with the same period of 2007. Topeka police reported a 6.4% drop in crime from 2007 to 2008, including significant reductions in business robberies and aggravated assaults and batteries, as well as thefts.

On October 11, 2011, the Topeka city council agreed to repeal the ordinance banning domestic violence in an effort to force the Shawnee County District Attorney to prosecute the cases. Shawnee County District Attorney Chad Taylor said the DA "would no longer prosecute misdemeanors committed in Topeka, including domestic battery, because his office could no longer do so after county commissioners cut his budget by 10%". The next day, Taylor said his office would "commence the review and filing of misdemeanors decriminalized by the City of Topeka". The same day, 17% of the employees in the district attorney's office were announced to be laid off.

=== Religion ===
Topeka is sometimes cited as the home of Pentecostalism, as it was the site of Charles Fox Parham's Bethel Bible College, where glossolalia was first claimed as the evidence of a spiritual experience referred to as the baptism of the Holy Spirit in 1901. It is also the home of Reverend Charles Sheldon, author of In His Steps, and was the site where the famous question "What would Jesus do?" originated in a sermon of Sheldon's at Central Congregational Church.

The First Presbyterian Church in Topeka is one of the few churches in the U.S. to have its sanctuary completely decorated with Tiffany stained glass (another is St. Luke's United Methodist in Dubuque, Iowa; another is the Emmanuel Episcopal Church in Cumberland, Maryland).

The Roman Catholic population is large, and the city is home to nine Roman Catholic parishes, five of which feature elementary schools. Grace Cathedral of the Episcopal Diocese of Kansas is a large Gothic Revival structure in the city.

Topeka also has a claim in the history of the Baháʼí Faith in Kansas. Not only does the city have the oldest continuous Baháʼí community in Kansas (beginning in 1906), but the community also has roots to the first Baháʼí community in Kansas, in Enterprise, in 1897. This was the second Baháʼí community in the Western Hemisphere.

Topeka is home of the Westboro Baptist Church, a hate group according to the Southern Poverty Law Center. The homophobic church has garnered worldwide media attention for picketing the funerals of U.S. servicemen and women for what church members claim as "necessary to combat the fight for equality for gays and lesbians". They have sometimes successfully brought lawsuits against the city of Topeka. Directly across the street from them is the Equality House, a pro-LGBT home where volunteers of Planting Peace can stay. It is painted in rainbow colors and serves as a home for social workers caring for the LGBT+ community.

== Economy ==
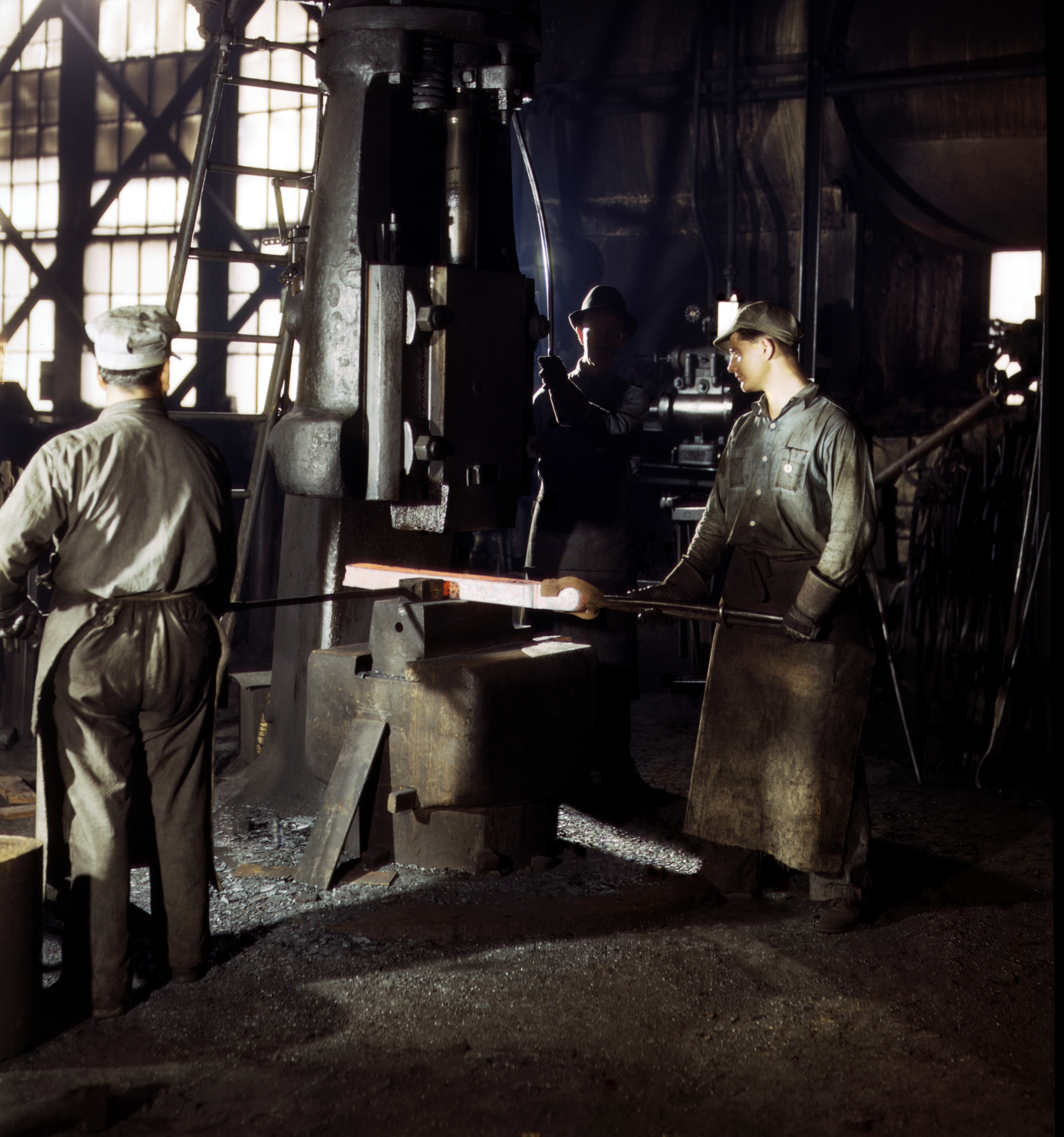
Blacksmiths at the Atchison, Topeka & Santa Fe Railway shops in Topeka, 1943

Being the state's capital city, Topeka's largest employer is the State of Kansas—employing about 8,400 people, or 69% of the city's government workers. Altogether, government workers make up one out of every five employed persons in the city.

The educational, health, and social services industry makes up the largest proportion of the working population (22.4%). The four school districts employ nearly 4,700 people, and Washburn University employs about 1,650. Three of the largest employers are Stormont-Vail HealthCare (with about 3,100 employees), St. Francis Health Center (1,800), and Colmery-O'Neil Veterans Administration Hospital (900).

The retail trade employs more than a tenth of the working population (11.5%) with Wal-Mart and Dillons having the greater share. Nearly another tenth is employed in manufacturing (9.0%). Top manufacturers include Goodyear Tire and Rubber Company, Hill's Pet Nutrition, Frito-Lay, and Jostens Printing and Publishing. Jostens announced plans in May 2012 to move production from its Topeka facility to Clarksville, Tennessee, affecting about 372 employee positions. Southwest Publishing & Mailing Corporation, a smaller employer, has its headquarters in Topeka.

Other industries are finance, insurance, real estate, and rental and leasing (7.8%); professional, scientific, management, administrative, and waste management services (7.6%); arts, entertainment, recreation, accommodation and food services (7.2%); construction (6.0%); transportation and warehousing, and utilities (5.8%); and wholesale trade (3.2%). Blue Cross and Blue Shield of Kansas is the largest insurance employer, with about 1,800 employees. BNSF is the largest transportation employer, with about 1,100. Evergy employs nearly 800. About a tenth of the working population is employed in public administration (9.9%).

=== Top Employers ===
As of the city's 2023 Annual Comprehensive Financial Report, Topeka's top employers are:

| # | Employer | Number of employees |
|---|---|---|
| 1 | State of Kansas | 9,919 |
| 2 | Stormont-Vail Health Care | 4,400 |
| 3 | Hill's Pet Nutrition | 3,439 |
| 4 | Topeka Unified School District 501 | 2,500 |
| 5 | Blue Cross Blue Shield of Kansas | 2,026 |
| 6 | BNSF Railway Company | 1,931 |
| 7 | Washburn University | 1,596 |
| 8 | Colmery-O'Neil VA Medical Center | 1,544 |
| 9 | University of Kansas Health System St. Francis Campus | 1,334 |
| 10 | Security Benefit Group of Companies | 1,000 |

== Arts and culture ==
=== Arts ===
The Topeka Symphony Orchestra was founded in 1945 and currently performs on the campus of Washburn University.

Topeka is home to broad areas of fine art, including in the Northern Topeka (NOTO) Arts & Entertainment District. Since 2007 the city has worked on the Great Mural Wall of Topeka, a community-driven initiative featuring murals telling the story of the city.

=== Points of interest ===
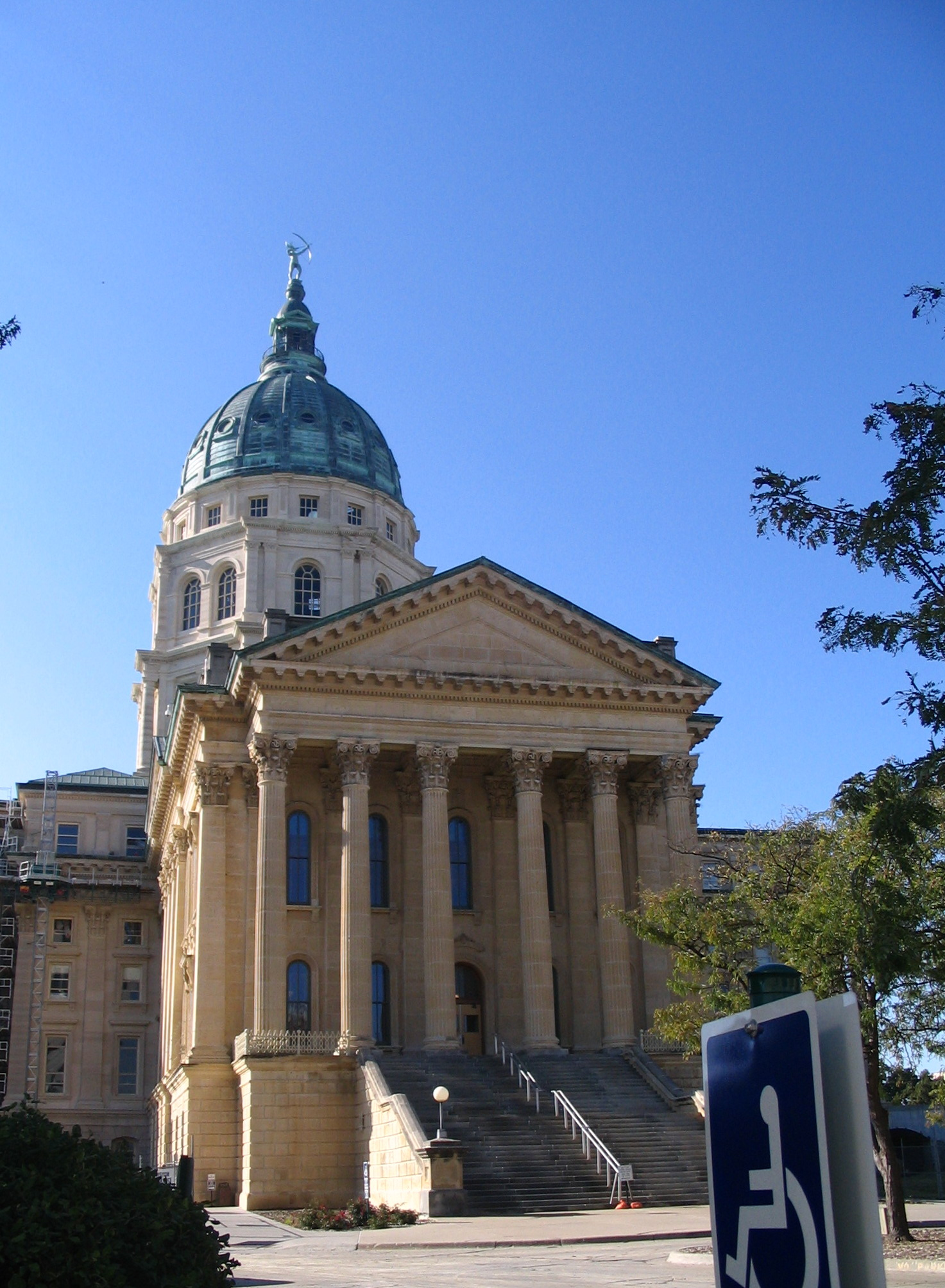
The capitol building, built 1866–1903

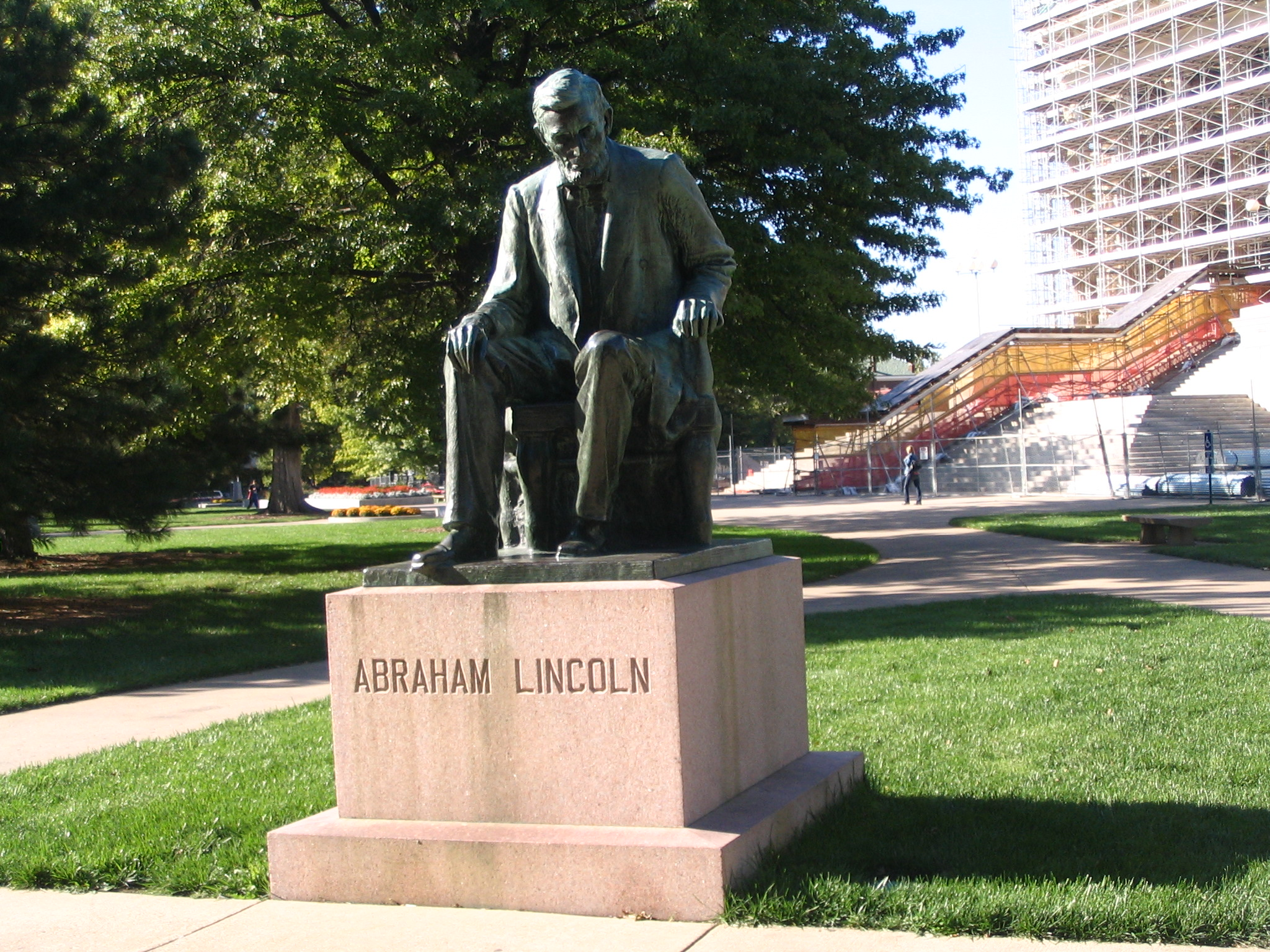
Abraham Lincoln statue in Topeka park

- Brown v. Board of Education National Historic Site
- Kansas Children's Discovery Center in Gage Park
- Kansas State Capitol, with murals by John Steuart Curry, including the portrait of John Brown towering over "Bleeding Kansas" and the Kansas prairie, and topped with the sculpture of a native warrior named Ad Astra (from the state motto Ad Astra per Aspera, meaning "To the Stars Through Difficulty".)
- Kansas Expocentre and Landon Arena
- Combat Air Museum at Forbes Field
- Heartland Park Topeka, a major drag racing and road racing course just south of the city.
- Kansas Museum of History
- Reinisch Rose Garden and Doran Rock Garden, both parts of Gage Park.
- Topeka High School
- Topeka & Shawnee County Public Library
- Topeka Zoo, famous as the birthplace of the first golden eagle chick hatched in captivity and as the first zoo in the nation to have an indoor rain forest.
- Old Prairie Town at Ward-Meade Historic Site
- Washburn University, the last city-chartered university in the United States.
- Oakland Neighborhood
- Potwin Place Historic District, originally its own town, Potwin has now been surrounded by the City of Topeka, though it maintains its own traditions, including the Easter brunch and Fourth of July Parade.
- Kansas Judicial Center, where both the Supreme Court and Court of Appeals for the state sit.
- Cedar Crest, the Kansas Governor's Mansion on a hilltop overlooking the massive MacLennan Park.
- Great Overland Station, home of the Kansas Hall of Fame.
- The Upstage Gallery
- Museum of the Kansas National Guard

=== Sports ===
Topeka is home to the Topeka Warhawks, a collegiate summer baseball team in the Mid-Plains league, which comprises teams from Kansas and neighboring Missouri.

The city hosted three now defunct indoor football teams, the Topeka Knights/Kings (1999–2000), the Kansas Koyotes (2003–2014), and the Topeka Tropics (2022–2023).

Topeka is home to a professional hockey team, the Topeka Scarecrows of the Federal Prospects Hockey League. They are the first professional hockey team to call Topeka home since the Tarantulas left the city in 2005. The Scarecrows played their inaugural 2025–2026 season at the Stormont Vail Events Center in Topeka.

== Government ==
=== City ===
The current mayor of Topeka is Spencer Duncan. The city manager is Robert Perez. The city manager is responsible to the Topeka's City Council, which consists of the mayor and nine members elected from separate districts within the city. The city council members select the deputy mayor from among themselves. The deputy mayor chairs the Committee of the Whole and represents the City of Topeka at official functions whenever the mayor is unavailable. The city manager also guides the council through the meetings but cannot vote.

=== State ===
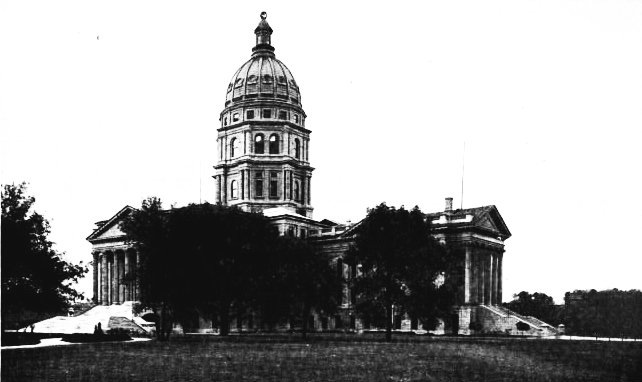
Kansas State Capitol in 1912

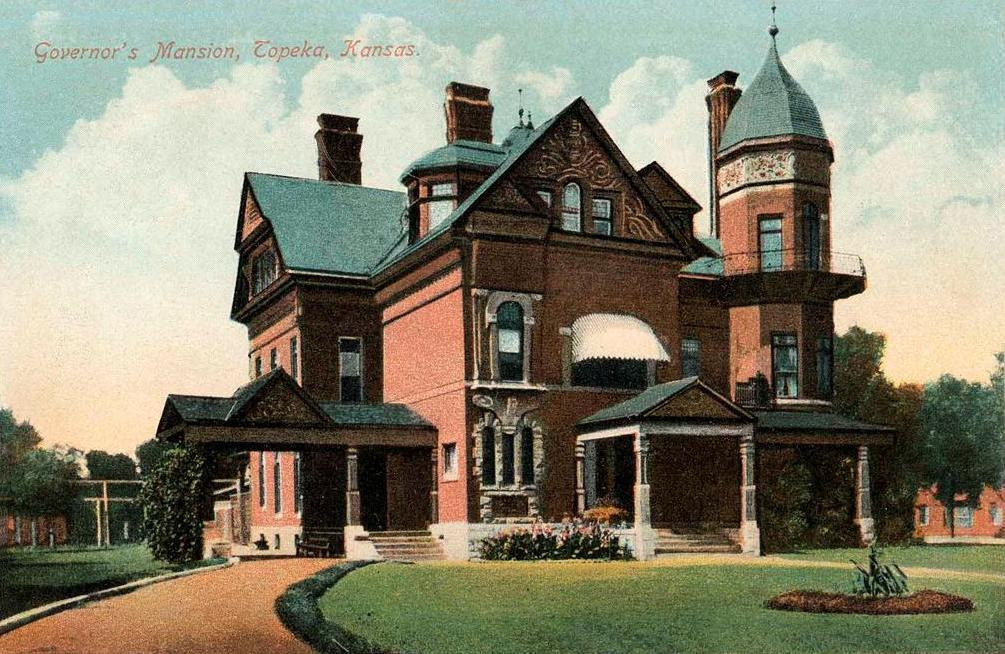
Old Governor's Mansion (1887), replaced by Cedar Crest in 1963 and demolished the following year

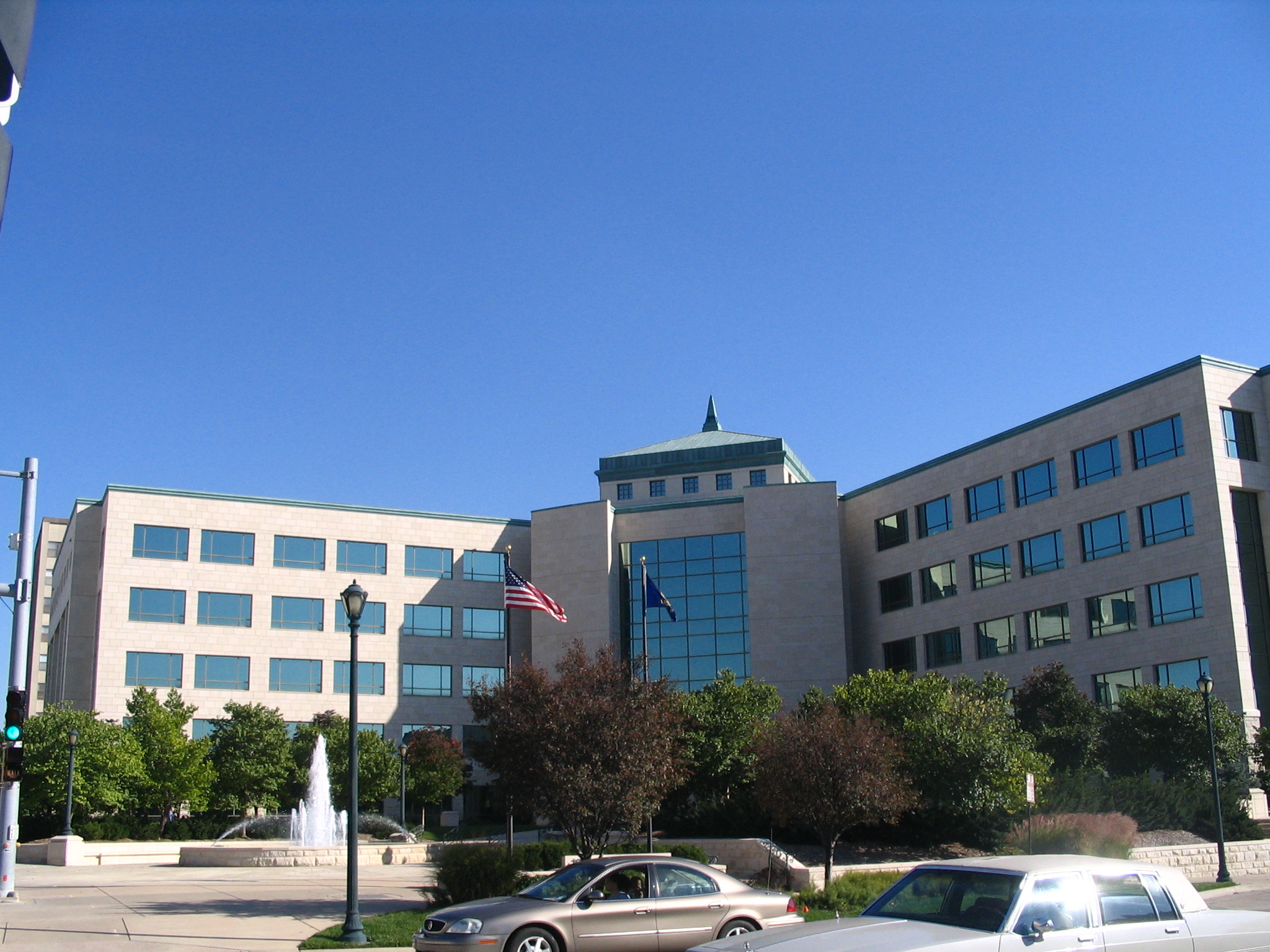
The Charles Curtis State Office Building (2001), facing the capitol

== Education ==
=== Elementary and secondary education ===
Topeka is served by four public school districts, including:

- Topeka USD 501 (serving inner Topeka)
- Shawnee Heights USD 450 (serving east and southeast Topeka)
- Auburn–Washburn USD 437 (serving west and southwest Topeka)
- Seaman USD 345 (serving North Topeka)

=== Post-secondary education ===
Topeka has several colleges, universities, technical schools and branch campuses of other universities around the state. These include the following:

- Washburn University
- Friends University (Topeka Campus)
- Washburn Institute of Technology
- Baker University School of Nursing (Topeka Campus)
- University of Kansas Health Center (St. Francis Campus)
- Rasmussen College (Topeka Campus)

== Media ==
=== Print ===
Topeka is the home of a daily newspaper, the Topeka Capital-Journal; a bi-weekly newspaper, The Topeka Metro News; Topeka Metro Voice; and Kaw Valley Senior Monthly. From 1911 to 1913, the city published the Kansas Baptist Herald.

=== Radio ===
The following radio stations are licensed to Topeka:

AM

| Frequency | Callsign | Format | Notes |
|---|---|---|---|
| 580 | WIBW | News/Talk | |
| 1440 | KMAJ | News/Talk | |
| 1490 | KTOP | Sports | |

FM

| Frequency | Callsign | Format | Notes |
|---|---|---|---|
| 88.1 | KJTY | Contemporary Christian | |
| 89.5 | K208FE | Christian | Translator of KAWZ, Twin Falls, Idaho |
| 90.3 | KBUZ | Christian | AFR |
| 94.5 | WIBW-FM | Country | |
| 96.9 | KOZA | Hot Adult Contemporary | |
| 98.5 | KSAJ-FM | Adult hits | |
| 99.3 | KWIC | Classic hits | |
| 100.3 | KDVV | AOR | |
| 102.9 | KTOP-FM | Country | |
| 106.9 | KTPK | Classic country | |
| 107.7 | KMAJ | Adult contemporary | |

Additionally, most of the Kansas City stations provide at least grade B coverage of Topeka. KANU-FM in Lawrence (in the Kansas City market) serves as Topeka's NPR member station.

=== Television ===
The following television stations are licensed to Topeka:

| Digital Channel | Analog Channel | Callsign | Network | Notes |
|---|---|---|---|---|
| 11 | 11 | KTWU | PBS | |
| 13 | 13 | WIBW-TV | CBS | |
| 25 | 26 | WROB-LD | Buzzr | |
| 27 | 27 | KSNT | NBC | |
| | 33 | K33IC | TBN | |
| 43 | 20 | KTMJ-CD | FOX | |
| 48; 49 ^{(Virtual)} | 49 | KTKA-TV | ABC | |

== Infrastructure ==
=== Transportation ===
I-70, I-470, and I-335 all go through the City of Topeka. I-335 is part of the Kansas Turnpike where it passes through Topeka. Other major highways include: US-24, US-40, US-75, and K-4. Major roads within the city include NW/SW Topeka Blvd. SW Wanamaker Road. N/S Kansas Ave. SW/SE 29th St. SE/SW 21st St. SE California Ave. SW Gage Blvd. and SW Fairlawn Rd.

Topeka Regional Airport (FOE), formerly known as Forbes Field, is in south Topeka in Pauline, Kansas. Forbes Field also serves as an Air National Guard base, home of the highly decorated 190th Air Refueling Wing. Manhattan Regional Airport (MHK) in Manhattan, Kansas is the next closest commercial airport; Kansas City International Airport (MCI) in Kansas City is the closest major airport. Philip Billard Municipal Airport (TOP) is located in Topeka's Oakland area.

Passenger rail service provided by Amtrak stops at the Topeka Station. Service is via the Chicago-to-Los Angeles Southwest Chief during the early morning and makes intermediate stops at Lawrence and Kansas City. The Kansas Department of Transportation has asked Amtrak to study additional service, including daytime service to Oklahoma City. The Burlington Northern Santa Fe railroad and Union Pacific Railroad provide freight service as well as several short line railroads throughout the state.

Greyhound Lines provides bus service westward towards Denver, Colorado, eastward to Kansas City, Missouri, southwest to Wichita, Kansas.

The Topeka Metropolitan Transit Authority provides local transit service. The agency offers bus service from 6 am to 6:30 pm Monday through Friday, and 7 am to 5 pm on Saturday. It also provides demand response general public taxi service which operates evenings from 8 pm until 11:30 pm and on Sundays.

=== Utilities ===
- Electricity: Evergy
- Home telephone: AT&T and Cox
- Cable: Cox Communications and AT&T
- Satellite TV: Dish and DirecTV
- Gas: Kansas Gas Service
- Water and sewer: City of Topeka
- Sanitation: Shawnee County Waste Management
- Internet: Cox (cable), AT&T (fiber, DSL, and fixed wireless), and other providers.

=== Health care ===
Topeka has two major hospitals, Stormont-Vail and The University of Kansas Hospital - St. Francis Campus. Both are in central Topeka. Topeka is also home to the Colmery-O'Neil VA Medical Clinic and Topeka ER & Hospital.

== See also ==
- Great Flood of 1951
- 1966 F5 tornado
- USS Topeka, 3 ships
