= Topeka Metro =

Public transit agency in Topeka, Kansas

Topeka Metropolitan Transit Authority

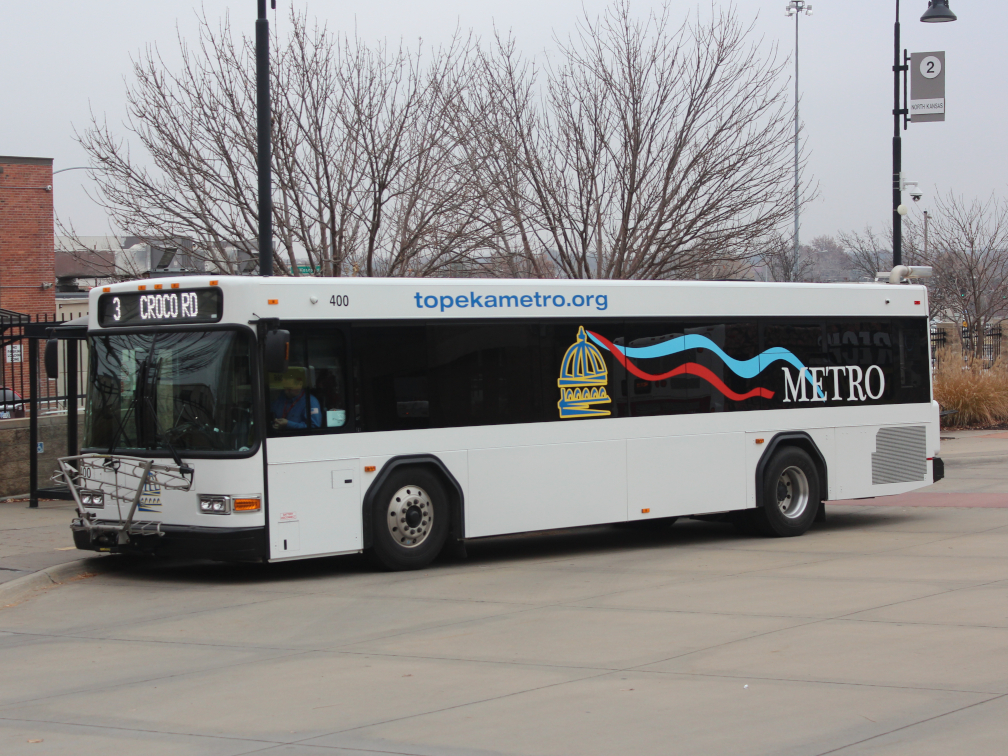
- Founded: 1973
- Headquarters: Quincy Street Station, 820 SE Quincy St, Topeka KS 66612
- Service type: bus service, paratransit
- Routes: 12
- Daily ridership: 5,732
- Operator: Topeka Metropolitan; Transit Authority
- Chief executive: Robert Nugent
- Website: topekametro.org

Topeka Metro is the fixed-route and paratransit public transportation operator in the city of Topeka, Kansas. It carries passengers Monday through Saturday on 12 routes. Topeka Metro also runs a paratransit service during its service hours.

== History ==
Officially the Topeka Metropolitan Transit Authority, it was founded in 1973. It is governed by a board of seven directors that serve four-year terms. The system recorded its highest ridership in 2008 with 1.8 million rides. In April 2015, Topeka Metro launched the state's first bikeshare system. Topeka Metro Bikes (TMB) the bikeshare program ended on July 30, 2020.

Topeka Metro was named Transit of the Year 2018 by the Kansas Public Transit Association. Topeka is recognized by the League of American Bicyclists as a bicycle-friendly community, and Topeka Metro is recognized as a bicycle-friendly business.

== Routes ==
Topeka Metro Bus Routes and Detours
No.	Description	Notes
1	Oakland	Oakland Line & Schedule
2	North Kansas	North Kansas Line & Schedule
3	East 6th	East 6th Line & Schedule
4	California	California Line & Schedule
5	Indiana	Indiana Line & Schedule
6	West 6th	West 6th Line & Schedule
7	Washburn	Washburn Line & Schedule
10	West 10th	West 10th Line & Schedule
12	Huntoon	Huntoon Line & Schedule
17	West 17th	West 17th Line & Schedule
21	West 21st	West 21st Line & Schedule
29	West 29th	West 29th Line & Schedule

== Fixed route ridership ==
The ridership statistics shown here are of fixed route services only and do not include demand response services.

== See also ==
- List of bus transit systems in the United States
