= Manhattan Township, Kansas =

Township in Riley County, Kansas, U.S.

Manhattan Township
- Township
- Sunset over the Konza Prairie Biological Station in Manhattan Township.

- Location within Riley County
- Coordinates: 39.139945°N 96.528718°W
- Country: United States
- State: Kansas
- County: Riley

Government
  - Districts 1, 2, and 3 County Commissioners: John Ford (R); Greg McKinley (R); Kathryn Focke (D)

Area
  - Total: 32.852 sq mi (85.09 km^{2})
  - Land: 31.66 sq mi (82.0 km^{2})
  - Water: 1.192 sq mi (3.09 km^{2}) 3.62%

Population (2020)
  - Total: 2,190
  - Density: 69.2/sq mi (26.7/km^{2})
- Time zone: UTC-6 (CST)
  - Summer (DST): UTC-5 (CDT)
- Area code: 785
- GNIS feature ID: 476220

Manhattan Township is a township in Riley County, Kansas, United States. As of the 2020 census, its population was 2,190.

== Geography ==
Manhattan Township covers an area of 32.852 square miles (85.09 square kilometers). The Kansas River and the Big Blue River flow through it, and part of Tuttle Creek Lake lies within the township.

=== Adjacent townships ===
Grant Township, Riley County
		north	northeast	Blue Township, Pottawatomie County
Wildcat Township, Riley County	west	self	east	Zeandale Township, Riley County
Ogden Township, Riley County	southwest	south
Ashland Township, Riley County

== Transportation ==
=== Major highways ===
- US-24
- K-13
- K-18
- K-113
- K-177
