= Fancy Creek Township, Kansas =

Township in Riley County, Kansas, U.S.

Fancy Creek Township
- Township
- Location within Riley County
- Coordinates: 39.415577°N 96.88723°W
- Country: United States
- State: Kansas
- County: Riley

Government
  - District 2 County Commissioner: Greg McKinley (R)

Area
  - Total: 32.054 sq mi (83.02 km^{2})
  - Land: 32.041 sq mi (82.99 km^{2})
  - Water: 0.013 sq mi (0.034 km^{2}) 0.04%

Population (2020)
  - Total: 76
  - Density: 2.4/sq mi (0.92/km^{2})
- Time zone: UTC-6 (CST)
  - Summer (DST): UTC-5 (CDT)
- Area code: 785
- GNIS feature ID: 476054

Fancy Creek Township is a township in Riley County, Kansas, United States. As of the 2020 census, its population was 76.

== Geography ==
Fancy Creek Township covers an area of 32.054 square miles (83.02 square kilometers).

=== Adjacent townships ===
Center Township, Riley County
		north
Highland Township, Clay County	west	self	east	Jackson Township, Riley County
		south	southeast	Sherman Township, Riley County
Bala Township, Riley County
