= Madison Township, Riley County, Kansas =

Township in Riley County, Kansas, U.S.

Madison Township
- Township
- Location within Riley County
- Coordinates: 39.211099°N 96.808604°W
- Country: United States
- State: Kansas
- County: Riley

Government
  - District 2 County Commissioner: Greg McKinley (R)

Area
  - Total: 141.371 sq mi (366.15 km^{2})
  - Land: 141.249 sq mi (365.83 km^{2})
  - Water: 0.122 sq mi (0.32 km^{2}) 0.09%

Population (2020)
  - Total: 9,432
  - Density: 66.78/sq mi (25.78/km^{2})
- Time zone: UTC-6 (CST)
  - Summer (DST): UTC-5 (CDT)
- Area code: 785
- GNIS feature ID: 476200

Madison Township is a township in Riley County, Kansas, United States. As of the 2020 census, its population was 9,432.

== History ==
Seven Mile Township, which was created in the 1910s from Ogden Township, was consolidated into Madison Township in the 1960s.

== Geography ==
Madison Township covers an area of 141.371 square miles (366.15 square kilometers). The Kansas River flows through it. The township is dominated by the Fort Riley installation, which makes up most of the township's land area.

=== Communities ===
- Riley
- part of Fort Riley

=== Adjacent townships ===
Bala Township, Riley County
Grant Township, Clay County	northwest	north	northeast	Sherman Township, Riley County; Grant Township, Riley County
Milford Township, Geary County	west	self	east	Wildcat Township, Riley County
Smoky Hill Township, Geary County	southwest	south	southeast	Ogden Township, Riley County
Jefferson Township, Geary County

== Transportation ==
=== Major highways ===
- US-24
- US-77
- K-18
- K-82
