= May Day Township, Kansas =

Township in Riley County, Kansas, U.S.

May Day Township
- Township
- Location within Riley County
- Coordinates: 39.530751°N 96.870826°W
- Country: United States
- State: Kansas
- County: Riley

Government
  - District 2 County Commissioner: Greg McKinley (R)

Area
  - Total: 31.293 sq mi (81.05 km^{2})
  - Land: 31.283 sq mi (81.02 km^{2})
  - Water: 0.01 sq mi (0.026 km^{2}) 0.03%

Population (2020)
  - Total: 86
  - Density: 2.7/sq mi (1.1/km^{2})
- Time zone: UTC-6 (CST)
  - Summer (DST): UTC-5 (CDT)
- Area code: 785
- GNIS feature ID: 473376

May Day Township is a township in Riley County, Kansas, United States. As of the 2020 census, its population was 86.

== Geography ==
May Day Township covers an area of 31.293 square miles (81.05 square kilometers).

=== Adjacent townships ===
Lincoln Township, Washington County
Kimeo Township, Washington County	northwest	north
Goshen Township, Clay County	west	self	east	Swede Creek Township, Riley County
		south	southeast	Jackson Township, Riley County
Center Township, Riley County
