= Ogden Township, Kansas =

Township in Riley County, Kansas, U.S.

Ogden Township
- Township
- Location within Riley County
- Coordinates: 39.123883°N 96.684367°W
- Country: United States
- State: Kansas
- County: Riley

Government
  - District 2 County Commissioner: John Ford (R)

Area
  - Total: 12.652 sq mi (32.77 km^{2})
  - Land: 12.26 sq mi (31.8 km^{2})
  - Water: 0.392 sq mi (1.02 km^{2}) 3.10%

Population (2020)
  - Total: 2,029
  - Density: 165.5/sq mi (63.90/km^{2})
- Time zone: UTC-6 (CST)
  - Summer (DST): UTC-5 (CDT)
- Area code: 785
- GNIS feature ID: 476348

Ogden Township is a township in Riley County, Kansas, United States. As of the 2020 census, its population was 2,029.

== History ==
Two times in Ogden Township's history townships were created from it. The first was Seven Mile Township, created in the 1910s, and later given over to Madison Township in the 1960s. The second was Fort Riley Township, created in the 1970s. Fort Riley Township did not last very long and was reabsorbed into Ogden Township. Ogden Township was home to the first settlers and voting in Riley County, both of which took place in 1854.

== Geography ==
Ogden Township covers an area of 12.652 square miles (32.77 square kilometers). The Kansas River flows through it.

=== Communities ===
- Ogden

=== Adjacent townships ===
Wildcat Township, Riley County
		north	northeast	Manhattan Township, Riley County
Madison Township, Riley County	west	self	east	Ashland Township, Riley County
Jefferson Township, Geary County	southwest	south	southeast	Jackson Township, Riley County
Wingfield Township, Geary County

== Transportation ==
=== Major highways ===
- K-18
- K-114
