= Jackson Township, Kansas =

Jackson Township is the name of nine townships in Kansas:

- Jackson Township, Anderson County, Kansas
- Jackson Township, Edwards County, Kansas
- Jackson Township, Geary County, Kansas
- Jackson Township, Jewell County, Kansas
- Jackson Township, Lyon County, Kansas
- Jackson Township, McPherson County, Kansas
- Jackson Township, Osborne County, Kansas
- Jackson Township, Riley County, Kansas
- Jackson Township, Sumner County, Kansas

== See also ==
- Jackson Township (disambiguation)
