= Blue Valley Township, Kansas =

Township in Pottawatomie County, Kansas, U.S.

Blue Valley Township
- Township
- Location within Pottawatomie County
- Coordinates: 39.455892°N 96.642886°W
- Country: United States
- State: Kansas
- County: Pottawatomie
- Established: 1882

Government
  - County Commissioner District 5: Terry Force

Area
  - Total: 49.199 sq mi (127.42 km^{2})
  - Land: 44.182 sq mi (114.43 km^{2})
  - Water: 5.017 sq mi (12.99 km^{2}) 10.20%

Population (2020)
  - Total: 380
  - Density: 8.6/sq mi (3.3/km^{2})
- Time zone: UTC-6 (CST)
  - Summer (DST): UTC-5 (CDT)
- Area code: 785
- GNIS feature ID: 473398

Blue Valley Township is a township in Pottawatomie County, Kansas, United States. As of the 2020 census, its population was 380.

== History ==
Blue Valley Township was established in 1882.

== Geography ==
Blue Valley Township covers an area of 49.199 square miles (127.42 square kilometers). The Big Blue River flows through it. Tuttle Creek Lake and its state park are also located within the township.

=== Communities ===
- Olsburg

=== Adjacent townships ===
| Swede Creek Township, Riley County | northwest | | northeast | Spring Creek Township, Pottawatomie County |
| Jackson Township, Riley County | west | self | east | Shannon Township, Pottawatomie County |
| Sherman Township, Riley County | southwest | south |
Green Township, Pottawatomie County

== Transportation ==
=== Major highways ===
- K-16
