= K-113 (Kansas highway) =

State highway in Kansas, U.S.

K-113
- Seth Child Road
- K-113 highlighted in red

Route information
- Maintained by KDOT
- Length: 5.631 mi (9.062 km)
- Existed: July 7, 1965–present

Major junctions
- South end: K-18 in Manhattan
- North end: US-24 north of Manhattan

Location
- Country: United States
- State: Kansas
- Counties: Riley

Highway system
- Kansas State Highway System; Interstate; US; State; Spurs
← K-112	→ K-114

K-113 is a 5.631-mile-long (9.062 km) north–south state highway entirely within Riley County in the northeastern part of the U.S. state of Kansas. It runs from K-18 in southern Manhattan to U.S. Route 24 (US-24), through the city's western areas. In Manhattan, it is named after Seth Child, an early Manhattan pioneer. Most of the highway is four-laned with mixed-access, and serves as a major arterial highway for the city's western portions, as well as traffic accessing Kansas State University's athletic facilities. It is almost wholly inside the Manhattan city limits, and ends near the Riley County shops along US-24 north of Manhattan.

The original K-113 was designated by 1936, and traveled from K-13 west of Bigelow north to K-9 in Blue Rapids. This alignment was decommissioned in late 1958. The current K-113 was first designated in 1957, as US-24 Spur in Manhattan. Then on July 7, 1965, US-24 Spur was renumbered to K-113, and was completed by 1967.

== Route description ==
The road begins at K-18 in the western part of Manhattan with a diverging diamond interchange. The route moves northward through suburbs surrounded by deciduous forests before reaching a diamond interchange with Anderson Avenue and then another with Kimball Avenue, travelling through a more condensed part of town. Passing Washington Marlatt Memorial Park, the road exits town and enters a semi-rural grassland area, ending at a partial interchange with US-24.

The Kansas Department of Transportation (KDOT) tracks the traffic levels on its highways, and in 2018, they determined that on average the traffic varied from 5300 vehicles per day near the northern terminus to 24700 vehicles per day between the southern terminus and Anderson Avenue interchange. The entire length of K-113 is included in the National Highway System, a system of highways important to the nation's defense, economy, and mobility. K-113 also connects to the National Highway System at each terminus.

== History ==
=== Early roads ===
Before state highways were numbered in Kansas there were auto trails, which were an informal network of marked routes that existed in the United States and Canada in the early part of the 20th century. The northern terminus of K-113 connected to the Roosevelt National Highway and Kansas White Way, and the southern terminus connected to the Golden Belt Highway.

=== Original alignment ===
K-113
- Location: near Bigelow–Blue Rapids
- Existed: c. 1936–November 19, 1958

By 1936, the original K-113 was established from K-13 west of Bigelow north to K-9 in Blue Rapids. Then in a November 19, 1958 resolution, K-13 was rerouted to cross the Tuttle Creek Dam and continue northward to K-16 east of Olsburg, and at this time K-113 was decommissioned.

=== Current alignment ===
In a September 10, 1957 resolution, the roadway was designated as US-24 Spur from K-18 north, across US-24, to the proposed relocation of US-24. In a November 10, 1960 resolution, this US-24 Spur was extended 3.6 miles (5.8 km) north to a proposed K-213. Between 1963 and 1965, US-24 had been relocated north onto the proposed K-213. Then in a July 7, 1965 resolution, US-24 Spur was renumbered to K-113, and was completed by 1967. The northern terminus, US-24, originally overlapped K-177 until 1991. In a January 1, 1991 resolution, K-177 was truncated to the southeast side of Manhattan.

On April 5, 2017, work began to convert the interchange with K-18 into a diverging diamond interchange. The $2.587 million project (equivalent to $3.25 million in 2024) was completed and open to traffic in December 2017.

== Major intersections ==
The entire route is in Riley County.

Location	mi	km	Destinations	Notes
Manhattan	0.000	0.000	K-18 (Fort Riley Boulevard)	Southern terminus; diverging diamond interchange; road continues as Canyon Drive
Manhattan	1.553	2.499	Anderson Avenue	Diamond interchange
Manhattan	2.774	4.464	Kimball Avenue	Diamond interchange; access to Bill Snyder Family Football Stadium and Bramlage Coliseum
Manhattan Township	5.631	9.062	US-24 (Tuttle Creek Boulevard)	Northern terminus
1.000 mi = 1.609 km; 1.000 km = 0.621 mi
