= Green Township, Kansas =

Township in Pottawatomie County, Kansas, U.S.

Green Township
- Township
- Location within Pottawatomie County
- Coordinates: 39.363972°N 96.593166°W
- Country: United States
- State: Kansas
- County: Pottawatomie
- Established: 1882

Government
  - County Commissioner District 5: Terry Force

Area
  - Total: 53.514 sq mi (138.60 km^{2})
  - Land: 48.185 sq mi (124.80 km^{2})
  - Water: 5.329 sq mi (13.80 km^{2}) 9.96%

Population (2020)
  - Total: 213
  - Density: 4.42/sq mi (1.71/km^{2})
- Time zone: UTC-6 (CST)
  - Summer (DST): UTC-5 (CDT)
- Area code: 785
- GNIS feature ID: 476074

Green Township is a township in Pottawatomie County, Kansas, United States. As of the 2020 census, its population was 213.

== History ==
Green Township was established in 1882.

== Geography ==
Green Township covers an area of 53.514 square miles (138.60 square kilometers). Part of Tuttle Creek Lake lies within the township.

=== Adjacent townships ===
Blue Valley Township, Pottawatomie County
		north	northeast	Shannon Township, Pottawatomie County
Sherman Township, Riley County	west	self	east	Pottawatomie Township, Pottawatomie County
Grant Township, Riley County	southwest	south
Blue Township, Pottawatomie County

== Transportation ==
=== Major highways ===
- K-13
