= Grant Township, Riley County, Kansas =

Township in Riley County, Kansas, U.S.

Grant Township
- Township
- Location within Riley County
- Coordinates: 39.29121°N 96.727488°W
- Country: United States
- State: Kansas
- County: Riley

Government
  - District 2 County Commissioner: Greg McKinley (R)

Area
  - Total: 38.194 sq mi (98.92 km^{2})
  - Land: 35.605 sq mi (92.22 km^{2})
  - Water: 2.589 sq mi (6.71 km^{2}) 6.78%

Population (2020)
  - Total: 870
  - Density: 24/sq mi (9.4/km^{2})
- Time zone: UTC-6 (CST)
  - Summer (DST): UTC-5 (CDT)
- Area code: 785
- GNIS feature ID: 476211

Grant Township is a township in Riley County, Kansas, United States. As of the 2020 census, its population was 870.

== Geography ==
Grant Township covers an area of 38.194 square miles (98.92 square kilometers). Part of Tuttle Creek Lake lies within the township, and thus the Big Blue River flows through it as well.

=== Adjacent townships ===
Sherman Township, Riley County
		north	northeast	Green Township, Pottawatomie County
Madison Township, Riley County	west	self
Wildcat Township, Riley County	southwest	south	southeast	Blue Township, Pottawatomie County
Manhattan Township, Riley County

== Transportation ==
=== Major highways ===
- US-24
- US-77
