= Sherman Township, Riley County, Kansas =

Township in Riley County, Kansas, U.S.

Sherman Township
- Township
- Location within Riley County
- Coordinates: 39.372703°N 96.748637°W
- Country: United States
- State: Kansas
- County: Riley

Government
  - District 2 County Commissioner: John Ford (R)

Area
  - Total: 31.444 sq mi (81.44 km^{2})
  - Land: 29.4 sq mi (76 km^{2})
  - Water: 2.044 sq mi (5.29 km^{2}) 6.50%

Population (2020)
  - Total: 585
  - Density: 19.9/sq mi (7.68/km^{2})
- Time zone: UTC-6 (CST)
  - Summer (DST): UTC-5 (CDT)
- Area code: 785
- GNIS feature ID: 476066

Sherman Township is a township in Riley County, Kansas, United States. As of the 2020 census, its population was 585.

== Geography ==
Sherman Township covers an area of 31.444 square miles (81.44 square kilometers). Part of Tuttle Creek Lake lies within the township, and thus the Big Blue River flows through it as well.

=== Adjacent townships ===
Jackson Township, Riley County
Fancy Creek Township, Riley County	northwest	north	northeast	Blue Valley Township, Pottawatomie County
Bala Township, Riley County	west	self	east	Green Township, Pottawatomie County
Madison Township, Riley County	southwest	south
Grant Township, Riley County

== Transportation ==
=== Major highways ===
- US-77
