= Bala Township, Kansas =

Township in Riley County, Kansas, U.S.

Bala Township
- Township
- Location within Riley County
- Coordinates: 39.354127°N 96.897954°W
- Country: United States
- State: Kansas
- County: Riley
- Established: 1871

Government
  - District 2 County Commissioner: Greg McKinley (R)

Area
  - Total: 41.955 sq mi (108.66 km^{2})
  - Land: 41.917 sq mi (108.56 km^{2})
  - Water: 0.038 sq mi (0.098 km^{2}) 0.09%

Population (2020)
  - Total: 740
  - Density: 18/sq mi (6.8/km^{2})
- Time zone: UTC-6 (CST)
  - Summer (DST): UTC-5 (CDT)
- Area code: 785
- GNIS feature ID: 476057

Bala Township is a township in Riley County, Kansas, United States. As of the 2020 census, its population was 740.

== History ==
Bala Township was organized on July 30, 1871.

== Geography ==
Bala Township covers an area of 41.955 square miles (108.66 square kilometers).

=== Communities ===
- Leonardville
- Bala

=== Adjacent townships ===
Fancy Creek Township, Riley County
Highland Township, Clay County	northwest	north
		self	east	Sherman Township, Riley County
Grant Township, Clay County	southwest	south
Madison Township, Riley County

== Transportation ==
=== Major highways ===
- US-24
- US-77
- K-82
