= Manhattan Township =

Manhattan Township may refer:

- Manhattan Township, Illinois
- Manhattan Township, Kansas
