= Ashland Township, Kansas =

Township in Riley County, Kansas, U.S.

Ashland Township
- Township
- Location within Riley County
- Coordinates: 39.101476°N 96.56798°W
- Country: United States
- State: Kansas
- County: Riley

Government
  - District 1 County Commissioner: John Ford (R)

Area
  - Total: 34.646 sq mi (89.73 km^{2})
  - Land: 34.343 sq mi (88.95 km^{2})
  - Water: 0.303 sq mi (0.78 km^{2}) 0.87%

Population (2020)
  - Total: 147
  - Density: 4.28/sq mi (1.65/km^{2})
- Time zone: UTC-6 (CST)
  - Summer (DST): UTC-5 (CDT)
- Area code: 785
- GNIS feature ID: 476362

Ashland Township is a township in Riley County, Kansas, United States. As of the 2020 census, its population was 147.

== Geography ==
Ashland Township covers an area of 34.646 square miles (89.73 square kilometers). The Kansas River flows through it, and the township is home to most of Konza Prairie Biological Station.

=== Adjacent townships ===
Manhattan Township, Riley County
		north
Ogden Township, Riley County	west	self	east	Zeandale Township, Riley County
Wingfield Township, Geary County	southwest		southeast	Jackson Township, Geary County

== Transportation ==
=== Major highways ===
- K-177
