= Keats, Kansas =

Unincorporated community in Riley County, Kansas

- CDP
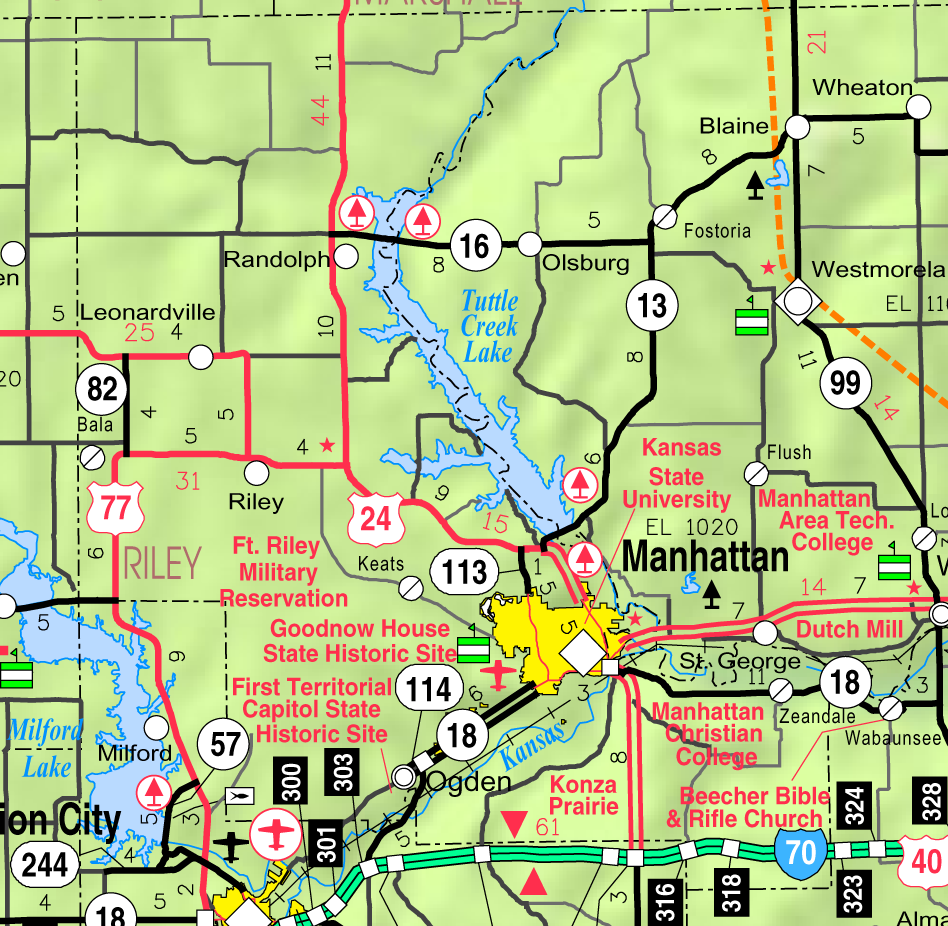
- KDOT map of Riley County (legend)

- Location within Kansas Location within the United States
- Coordinates: 39°13′10″N 96°42′27″W
- Country: United States
- State: Kansas
- Counties: Riley
- Founded: 1860, 1887
- Named for: John Keats
- Elevation: 1,122 ft (342 m)

Population (2020)
  - Total: 96
- Time zone: UTC-6 (CST)
  - Summer (DST): UTC-5 (CDT)
- Area code: 785
- FIPS code: 20-36200
- GNIS ID: 2804656

Keats is a census-designated place (CDP) in Wildcat Township, Riley County, Kansas, United States. As of the 2020 census, the population was 96. It is located five miles west of Manhattan.

== History ==
Keats was founded in 1887, its name suggested by a railroad official who regarded the poet John Keats as a favorite. Keats grew from a smaller town named Wildcat with origins dating to 1860.

== Demographics ==
Historical population
Census	Pop.	Note	%±
2020	96		—
U.S. Decennial Census

The 2020 United States census counted 96 people, 45 households, and 25 families in Keats. The population density was 208.2 per square mile (80.4/km^{2}). There were 45 housing units at an average density of 97.6 per square mile (37.7/km^{2}). The racial makeup was 88.54% (85) white or European American (81.25% non-Hispanic white), 1.04% (1) black or African-American, 3.12% (3) Native American or Alaska Native, 0.0% (0) Asian, 0.0% (0) Pacific Islander or Native Hawaiian, 3.12% (3) from other races, and 4.17% (4) from two or more races. Hispanic or Latino of any race was 13.54% (13) of the population.

Of the 45 households, 35.6% had children under the age of 18; 42.2% were married couples living together; 42.2% had a female householder with no spouse or partner present. 33.3% of households consisted of individuals and 4.4% had someone living alone who was 65 years of age or older. The average household size was 3.6 and the average family size was 4.4. The percent of those with a bachelor's degree or higher was estimated to be 88.5% of the population.

19.8% of the population was under the age of 18, 11.5% from 18 to 24, 34.4% from 25 to 44, 20.8% from 45 to 64, and 13.5% who were 65 years of age or older. The median age was 33.3 years. For every 100 females, there were 140.0 males. For every 100 females ages 18 and older, there were 133.3 males.

== Education ==
The community is served by Riley County USD 378 public school district.
