= K-82 (Kansas highway) =

State highway in Kansas, U.S.

K-82
- K-82 highlighted in red

Route information
- Maintained by KDOT
- Length: 21.076 mi (33.919 km)
- Existed: 1936–present

Major junctions
- West end: K-15 west of Wakefield
- US-77 near Bala
- North end: US-24 west of Leonardville

Location
- Country: United States
- State: Kansas
- Counties: Clay, Riley

Highway system
- Kansas State Highway System; Interstate; US; State; Spurs
← US-81	→ US-83

K-82 is an east–west state highway in the U.S. state of Kansas. The highway runs 21.076 miles (33.919 km) from K-15 west of Wakefield to U.S. Route 24 (US-24) west of Leonardville. K-82 is an L-shaped route in Clay and Riley counties. The route's east–west and north–south segments are separated by a concurrency with US-77. K-82's east–west segment serves Wakefield and Milford Lake, an impoundment of the Republican River.

The section from K-15 east to Wakefield, first appears as an unnumbered state highway on the 1932 state map. Then by April 1936, the section had been numbered K-82. Between 1961 and 1963, K-82 was extended east, from Wakefield to US-77. In 1965, US-77 was realigned and at this time, K-82 was extended northward to US-24.

== Route description ==
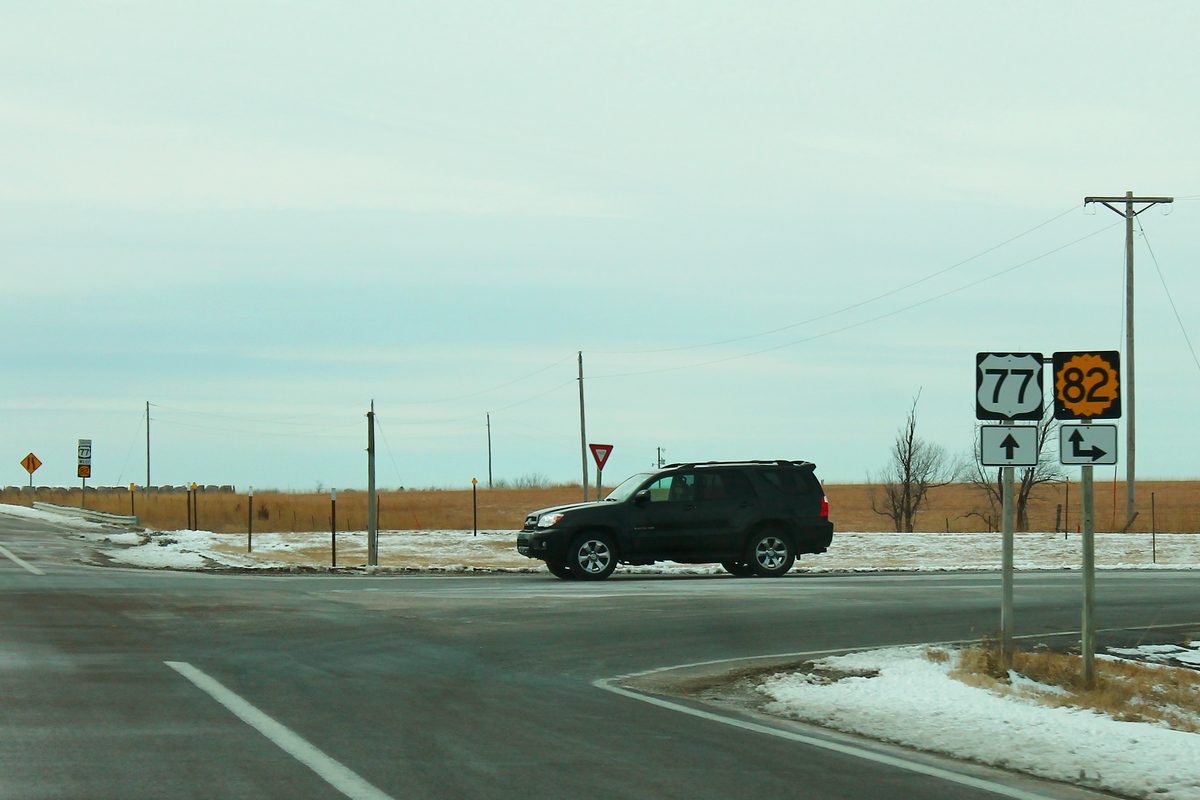
K-82 and US 77

K-82 begins at K-15 south of Clay Center and west of Wakefield in southern Clay County. The highway heads east and crosses Cane Creek on its way to the city of Wakefield, south of which lie the Auld Stone Bard and the Kansas Landscape Arboretum. K-82 enters the city on 10th Street, curves south on Elm Street, and leaves the city along 6th Street. The highway crosses Milford Lake on a bridge and causeway near the lake's north end. K-82 passes a U.S. Army Corps of Engineers park area, one of several along the lake, before the highway leaves Clay County and enters the Fort Riley reservation. The highway follows the Riley–Geary county line—Geary County to the south and Riley County to the north—east 1.5 miles (2.4 km) to US-77, which the highway joins heading north. After the two highways curve east on the northern edge of the military base reservation near the unincorporated community of Bala, K-82 turns north while US-77 continues east toward Riley. K-82 crosses Timber Creek before reaching its northern terminus at US-24 west of Leonardville.

The Kansas Department of Transportation (KDOT) tracks the traffic levels on its highways, and in 2018, they determined that on average the traffic varied from 625 vehicles near the western terminus to 1480 vehicles along the overlap with US-77. The section of K-82 between the western end of the overlap with US-77 and US-24 is included in the National Highway System, a system of highways important to the nation's defense, economy, and mobility.

== History ==
The road from K-15 east to Wakefield first appears of the 1932 state map, as a state highway but wasn't numbered. Then by April 1936, the section had been numbered K-82. In a June 12, 1964 resolution, K-82 was realigned one mile (1.6 km) to the north, from its western terminus to Wakefield. Between 1961 and 1963, K-82 was extended east, from Wakefield to US-77. Then in a March 17, 1965 resolution, due to expansion of Fort Riley, US-77 was realigned about 5.5 miles (8.9 km) to the west. At this time, K-82 was realigned along the new US-77, and extended northward to US-24 northwest of Leonardsville. In a September 14, 1966 resolution, a new alignment of K-82 was built from Wakefield, eastward across the reservoir to US-77 northwest of Milford.

== Major intersections ==
County	Location	mi	km	Destinations	Notes
Clay		0.000	0.000	K-15 – Abilene, Clay Center	Western terminus
Riley–Geary county line		10.718	17.249	US-77 south – Junction City	West end of concurrency with US-77
Riley		17.095	27.512	US-77 north – Manhattan, Marysville	East end of concurrency with US-77
Riley		21.076	33.919	US-24 – Clay Center, Leonardville	Eastern terminus
1.000 mi = 1.609 km; 1.000 km = 0.621 mi: Concurrency terminus
