= Blue Township, Kansas =

Township in Pottawatomie County, Kansas, U.S.

Blue Township
- Township
- Location within Pottawatomie County
- Coordinates: 39.278413°N 96.527884°W
- Country: United States
- State: Kansas
- County: Pottawatomie

Government
  - District 1 Commissioner: Deloyce McKee

Area
  - Total: 48.789 sq mi (126.36 km^{2})
  - Land: 43.341 sq mi (112.25 km^{2})
  - Water: 5.448 sq mi (14.11 km^{2}) 11.17%
- Elevation: 1,253 ft (382 m)

Population (2020)
  - Total: 4,926
  - Density: 113.7/sq mi (43.88/km^{2})
- Time zone: UTC-6 (CST)
  - Summer (DST): UTC-5 (CDT)
- Area code: 785
- GNIS feature ID: 476219

Blue Township is a township in Pottawatomie County, Kansas, United States. As of the 2020 census, its population was 4,926.

== Geography ==
Blue Township covers an area of 48.789 square miles (126.36 square kilometers). The Kansas River flows through it. Tuttle Creek Lake and its state park are also located within the township.

=== Adjacent townships ===
Green Township, Pottawatomie County
Grant Township, Riley County	northwest	north	northeast	Pottawatomie Township, Pottawatomie County
		self	east	St. George Township, Pottawatomie County
Manhattan Township, Riley County	southwest	south
Zeandale Township, Riley County

== Transportation ==
=== Major highways ===
- US-24
- K-13
