= Country Stampede =

Country music and camping festival in Kansas

Coordinates: 39°15′26″N 96°35′01″W

- Genre: Country music Classic rock
- Dates: June 26–28, 2025
- Locations: Manhattan, KS (1996–2018); Sparta, KY (2003–2004); Topeka, KS (2019–2023); Bonner Springs, KS (2024–)
- Years active: 1996–present
- Founders: Wayne Rouse
- Website: countrystampede.com

The Country Stampede Music Festival in Kansas is an outdoor country music and camping festival held at Azura Amphitheater in Bonner Springs, Kansas. The festival has been held annually in Kansas since 1996, usually on the last weekend in June (except in 2020 when it was cancelled due to the COVID pandemic).

The festival was held at Tuttle Creek State Park outside Manhattan, Kansas, from its founding in 1996 to 2018. The 2019 festival was moved to Topeka, initially due to potential flood conditions at Tuttle Creek Lake. Organizers announced the move would be permanent on June 20, 2019. Like many large -scale events, the festival was cancelled in 2020 due to the COVID-19 pandemic. In 2021, the festival had a successful three-day event despite poor weather. Organizers announced on October 19, 2021, that the 2022 festival would be moved to the month of July to attempt to avoid the history of severe weather during the event.

== Tuttle Creek State Park (1996–2018) ==
Festival logo 2012–2019

Festival logo until 2012

The Country Stampede festival was the largest annual music festival in Kansas while in Manhattan. Total combined attendance for all days exceeded 170,000 – in 2012 it was approximately 175,000. The record for largest single-day attendance was set on June 23, 2012, when an estimated 55,000 fans watched Toby Keith perform.

The festival began as a three-day weekend event, and then for several years was expanded to a four-day format, lasting from Thursday through Sunday. Camping was common for attendees, and 2,400 camp sites were available on the grounds. Vendors, and many activities were also present at the festival. Starting in 2016, the festival reverted to a three-day format. The Thursday night kickoff party was expanded into a full-day format, while Sunday was dropped from the weekend. Festival President Wayne Rouse said the decision would allow attendees a day off to recover and travel. The new format was well-received, and Rouse indicated the change would be permanent.

During this time, a sister festival was held at the Kentucky Speedway in Sparta, Kentucky, in 2003 and 2004.

After the festival moved to Topeka, it was not immediately replaced; however, a two-day red dirt music festival, Rock the Plains, was planned to be held at Tuttle Creek State Park in August 2025.

=== Past performers ===
Notable musical artists performing at the festival in Manhattan include:

- Jason Aldean
- Gary Allan
- Dierks Bentley
- Big & Rich
- Clint Black
- Brooks and Dunn
- Brothers Osborne
- Kane Brown
- Luke Bryan
- Chris Cagle
- Deana Carter
- Charlie Daniels Band
- Kenny Chesney
- Cross Canadian Ragweed
- Sara Evans
- Florida Georgia Line
- Pat Green
- Faith Hill
- Julianne Hough
- Alan Jackson
- Kansas
- Toby Keith
- Miranda Lambert
- Chris LeDoux
- Little Big Town
- Lynyrd Skynyrd
- Maddie & Tae
- Martina McBride
- Delbert McClinton
- Reba McEntire
- Tim McGraw
- Montgomery Gentry
- Nitty Gritty Dirt Band
- Old Dominion
- Brad Paisley
- Rascal Flatts
- Thomas Rhett
- LeAnn Rimes
- Darius Rucker
- Sawyer Brown
- Mark Selby (musician)
- Chris Stapleton
- Steve Miller Band
- Styx
- Sugarland
- Taylor Swift
- Keith Urban
- Phil Vassar
- Clay Walker
- Hank Williams, Jr.
- Mark Wills
- Gretchen Wilson
- Trisha Yearwood
- Dwight Yoakam
- Brett Young
- Zac Brown Band
- ZZ Top

== Topeka (2019–2023) ==
In May 2019, after severe rains caused increased water levels at Tuttle Creek Lake Dam, the organizers of Country Stampede announced on their Facebook page that the festival would move to Heartland Motorsports Park in Topeka for the 2019 event as a measure to "ensure all of [the] concert goers will be out of harm's way".

Despite reassurances from the festival organizers on their FAQ page that the event would not permanently move from Manhattan, on June 20, hours before the festival began, Country Stampede officials and leaders from the City of Topeka announced that the festival would permanently move to Heartland Motorsports Park for three additional years, renaming the festival to "Heartland Stampede", and terminating their contract with the Kansas Department of Wildlife, Parks, and Tourism to host the event at Tuttle Creek Lake State Park.

2019 headline performer Jason Aldean was forced to cancel his show due to severe weather.

=== 2020 cancellation ===
In September 2019, officials from the festival announced that Toby Keith, Luke Combs, and Cody Johnson would be the headlining performers for the 2020 festival, which was scheduled to take place from June 25 through the 27th.

In March 2020, Heartland Stampede announced through their Facebook page that a local credit union, Azura, had become the new title sponsor for the 2020 festival.

In April, organizers stated that the event would still go on, but later backpedaled and cancelled the event entirely due to the COVID-19 pandemic in Kansas, even after attempting to reschedule the event. An FAQ from the event stated that tickets purchased for the 2020 event would be automatically transferred to the 2021 event, unless purchasers accessed a form and requested a refund between the cancellation date of April 30 and May 31.

=== 2021 and beyond ===
In September 2020, the event, now renamed to "Heartland Country Stampede", announced that it would be partnering with a local company, VAERUS Aviation, to bring an airshow called "Thunder Over the Heartland" to the event on the final day of the 2021 festival, June 26, as well as an additional day on Sunday the 27th, with attendees to Country Stampede receiving free shuttle transport between Heartland Motorsports Park and Topeka Regional Airport for the airshow, the 190th Air Refueling Wing based at Topeka Regional would be participating, as well as that individual tickets would go on sale immediately for people wishing to see the airshow, but are not attending the festival. The announcement also included an announcement that headlining artists at the 2021 event would be Luke Combs, Morgan Wallen, and Riley Green.

=== Past performers ===
Notable musical artists performing at the festival in Topeka include:

- Clint Black
- Luke Combs
- Sam Hunt
- Old Dominion
- Jake Owen
- Morgan Wallen

== Bonner Springs (2024-present) ==
In December 2023, it was announced that Country Stampede would be moving to the Kansas City area for 2024, due to the closing of the Heartland Motorsports Park. It would be held at the Azura Amphitheater in Bonner Springs, Kansas.

== Naming ==
At its inception, it was named Country Stampede. In 2011, it was renamed 94.5 Country Stampede, and was sponsored by 94.5 Country Radio. In 2013, it was renamed Kicker Country Stampede, and was sponsored by Kicker Performance Audio Products. In 2020, it was renamed Heartland Country Stampede, due to the move to the Heartland Motorsports Park. In 2021, while still held at Heartland, its name was changed back to Country Stampede. In years since, Kicker has not consistently been included in the name of the event, though they have continued to sponsor it at some level. In 2022 Kicker returned as a sponsor, but has not been included in the name of the event since. It is currently named simply Country Stampede, with a subtitle of "Party in the Heartland".

Attendance

In its first year, 1996, Country Stampede saw around 35,000 attendees. By 2005 it had grown to nearly 150,000 attendees.

== History ==
=== Summary ===
Year	Dates	Venue	City	Name	Headlining performers
1996	June 21–23	Tuttle Creek State Park	Manhattan	Country Stampede	Friday: Tracy Lawrence; Saturday: Tim McGraw; Sunday:
1997	June 27–29	Tuttle Creek State Park	Manhattan	Country Stampede	Friday: Chris LeDoux; The Doobie Brothers; Alabama; Saturday: Delbert McClinton; Mark Chestnutt; Brooks & Dunn; Sunday: Toby Keith; John Michael Montgomery
1998	June 26–28	Tuttle Creek State Park	Manhattan	Country Stampede	Friday: Tim McGraw; Saturday: LeAnn Rimes; Sunday: Clint Black
1999	June 25–27	Tuttle Creek State Park	Manhattan	Country Stampede	Friday: John Michael Montgomery; Saturday: Sawyer Brown; Sunday: Reba McEntire
2000	June 22–25	Tuttle Creek State Park	Manhattan	Country Stampede	Friday: Styx; Saturday: Dwight Yoakam; Sunday: Brooks & Dunn
2001	June 21–24	Tuttle Creek State Park	Manhattan	Country Stampede	Thursday: Clay Walker; Friday: Chris LeDoux; Saturday: Sawyer Brown; Sunday: Neal McCoy
2002	June 27–30	Tuttle Creek State Park	Manhattan	Country Stampede	Thursday: Montgomery Gentry; Friday: Alan Jackson; Saturday: Kenny Chesney; Sunday: Toby Keith
2003	June 6–8	Kentucky Speedway	Sparta, KY	Meijer Country Stampede	Friday: Travis Tritt; Saturday: Lonestar; Sunday: Sawyer Brown
2003	June 26–29	Tuttle Creek State Park	Manhattan	Country Stampede	Thursday: Phil Vassar; Friday: Kenny Chesney; Saturday: Hank Williams Jr.; Sunday: Sawyer Brown
2004	June 3–6	Kentucky Speedway	Sparta, KY	Meijer Country Stampede	Thursday: Mark Chestnutt; Friday: Chris LeDoux; Saturday: Martina McBride; Sunday: Reba McEntire
2004	June 24–27	Tuttle Creek State Park	Manhattan	Country Stampede	Thursday: Mark Wills; Friday: Rascal Flatts; Saturday: Brooks & Dunn; Sunday: Steve Miller Band
2005	June 23–26	Tuttle Creek State Park	Manhattan	Country Stampede	Thursday: Phil Vassar Friday: Keith Urban Saturday: Big & Rich Sunday: ZZ Top
2006	June 22–25	Tuttle Creek State Park	Manhattan	Country Stampede	Thursday: Gretchen Wilson Friday: Toby Keith Saturday: Brad Paisley Sunday: Terri Clark
2007		Tuttle Creek State Park	Manhattan	Country Stampede	
2008		Tuttle Creek State Park	Manhattan	Country Stampede	
2009		Tuttle Creek State Park	Manhattan	Country Stampede	
2010	June 24–27	Tuttle Creek State Park	Manhattan	Country Stampede	Thursday: Miranda Lambert; Friday: Saturday: Sunday:
2011	June 23–26	Tuttle Creek State Park	Manhattan	94.5 Country Stampede	Thursday: Eric Church; Friday: Lady Antebellum; Saturday: Brad Paisley; Sunday: Sawyer Brown
2012	June 21–24	Tuttle Creek State Park	Manhattan	94.5 Country Stampede	Thursday: Luke Bryan; Friday: Zac Brown Band; Saturday: Toby Keith; Sunday: The Band Perry
2013	June 27–30	Tuttle Creek State Park	Manhattan	Kicker Country Stampede	Thursday: Little Big Town; Friday: Jason Aldean; Saturday: Trace Adkins; Sunday: Miranda Lambert
2014	June 26–29	Tuttle Creek State Park	Manhattan	Kicker Country Stampede	Thursday: Easton Corbin; Friday: Luke Bryan; Saturday: Eric Church; Sunday: Chris Young
2015	June 25–28	Tuttle Creek State Park	Manhattan	Kicker Country Stampede	Thursday: Thomas Rhett; Friday: Florida Georgia Line; Saturday: Blake Shelton; Sunday: Travis Tritt
2016	June 23–25	Tuttle Creek State Park	Manhattan	Kicker Country Stampede	Thursday: Friday: Saturday:
2017	June 22–24	Tuttle Creek State Park	Manhattan	Kicker Country Stampede	Thursday: Thomas Rhett; Friday: Chris Stapleton; Saturday: Alan Jackson
2018	June 21–23	Tuttle Creek State Park	Manhattan	Kicker Country Stampede	Thursday: Cole Swindell; Friday: Alabama; Saturday: Florida Georgia Line
2019	June 20–22	Heartland Motorsports Park	Topeka	Kicker Country Stampede	Jake Owen; Old Dominion; Clint Black; Jason Aldean (canceled - weather)
2020	June 25–27 (Canceled)	Heartland Motorsports Park	Topeka	Heartland Country Stampede	Originally scheduled: Thursday: Cody Johnson; Friday: Toby Keith; Saturday: Luke Combs
2021	June 24–26	Heartland Motorsports Park	Topeka	Country Stampede	Thursday: Friday: Sam Hunt; Saturday:
2022	July 14–16	Heartland Motorsports Park	Topeka	Country Stampede	Thursday: Walker Hayes; Friday: Jake Owen; Saturday: Kid Rock
2023	July 13–15	Heartland Motorsports Park	Topeka	Country Stampede	Thursday: Friday: Saturday:
2024	June 27–29	Azura Amphitheater	Bonner Springs	Country Stampede	Thursday: Chris Janson; Friday: Riley Green; Saturday: Jon Pardi
2025	June 26–28	Azura Amphitheater	Bonner Springs	Country Stampede	Thursday: Luke Bryan; Friday: Miranda Lambert; Saturday: Cole Swindell

=== Full performance list ===
==== 1996 ====
===== Friday =====
- Pott County Pork and Bean Band
- Jed Lance
- Rick Trevino
- Ty Herndon
- Chris LeDoux
- Little Texas

Saturday

- Jo Dee Messina
- Smokin' Armadillos
- Bryan White
- Blackhawk
- Faith Hill

Sunday

==== 1997 ====
Friday

- Dustin Evans, Kevin Sharp

Saturday

- Pott County Pork and Bean Band

Sunday

- Jill Marie
- Sons of the Desert
- Bill Engvall (comedian)
- LeAnn Rimes

==== 1998 ====
Friday

- The Ranch
- David Kersh
- Ricochet
- Sawyer Brown

Saturday

- Dustin Evans & Good Times
- Montgomery Gentry
- The Charlie Daniels Band
- Kenny Chesney
- Tracy Byrd
- Bryan White

Sunday

- Clark Family Experience
- Chely Wright
- Michael Peterson
- REO Speedwagon
- Blackhawk

==== 1999 ====
Friday

- Dustin Evans
- Great Divide
- Mark Wills
- Diamond Rio
- Dixie Chicks

Saturday

- Montgomery Gentry
- John Berry
- Toby Keith
- Faith Hill

Sunday

- Clark Family Experience
- Warren Brothers
- Foreigner
- The Wilkinsons
- Joe Diffie

==== 2000 ====
Friday

- Shannon Smith
- Chely Wright
- Oak Ridge Boys
- Montgomery Gentry
- Sawyer Brown

Saturday

- Travis Tritt
- Rhett Akins
- Lee Ann Womack
- Dustin Evans
- Kenny Chesney

Sunday

- Jill Marie
- Brad Paisley
- Sammy Kershaw
- Lonestar

==== 2003 (Kentucky) ====
===== Main stage =====
Friday

- Jolie Edwards
- Shevy Smith
- Trace Adkins
- Jeff Foxworthy (comedian)

Saturday

- Cledus T. Judd
- Carolyn Dawn Johnson
- Phil Vassar
- Brad Paisley

Sunday

- Kellie Coffey
- Blake Shelton
- Gary Allan
- Diamond Rio

===== Second stage =====
Friday

- Robinella & the CC String Band
- Mountain Heart
- Del McCoury Band
- Ricky Skaggs

Saturday

- Dusty Drake
- Shannon Lawson
- Jeff Bates
- Honkey Tonk Tailgate Party:
  - Chad Brock
  - Daryle Singletary
  - Wade Hayes
  - Rhett Akins

Sunday

- Dustin Evans
- Rodney Atkins
- Aaron Lines
- Emerson Drive

==== 2003 (Manhattan) ====
Thursday

- Mark Selby
- Joe Nichols

Friday

- Harry Luge Band
- Rodney Atkins
- Aaron Lines
- Deana Carter
- Shevy Smith
- Chris LeDoux

Saturday

- Jolie Edwards
- Anthony Smith
- Cledus T. Judd
- Gary Allan
- Martina McBride

Sunday

- Shevy Smith
- Carolyn Dawn Johnson
- Chris Cagle
- Keith Urban

==== 2004 (Kentucky) ====
Thursday

- Joe Diffie

Friday

- Harry Luge
- Lane Turner
- Chris Cagle
- Neal McCoy

Saturday

- Shevy Smith
- Dierks Bentley
- Darryl Worley
- Terri Clark

Sunday

- Cowboy Crush
- Craig Morgan
- Rushlow
- Clay Walker

==== 2004 (Manhattan) ====
Thursday

- Shevy Smith
- Rushlow
- Mark Wills

Friday

- Harry Luge
- Cowboy Crush
- Josh Turner
- Pat Green
- Clay Walker
- Rascal Flatts

Saturday

- Drew Davis Band
- Dustin Evans
- Nitty Gritty Dirt Band
- Joe Nichols
- Darryl Worley
- Brooks & Dunn

Sunday

- Blue County
- Craig Morgan
- Terri Clark
- Charlie Daniels Band
- Steve Miller Band

==== 2005 ====
Thursday

- Drew Davis Band
- Sugarland
- Phil Vassar

Friday

- Shevy Smith
- Keni Thomas
- Cross Canadian Ragweed
- Billy Currington
- Montgomery Gentry
- Keith Urban

Saturday

- Heather Shelley
- Shelly Fairchild
- SHeDAISY
- Dierks Bentley
- Sawyer Brown
- Big & Rich featuring Cowboy Troy

Sunday

- Lane Turner
- George Canyon
- Chely Wright
- Lonestar
- ZZ Top

==== 2006 ====
Thursday

- Jason Boland & The Stragglers
- Keith Anderson
- Gretchen Wilson

Friday

- The Blaine Younger Band
- Angela Peterson
- The Red Dogs
- Trent Tomlinson
- Joe Nichols
- Toby Keith

Saturday

- Jerrod Niemann
- Shevy Smith
- Eric Church
- Jason Aldean
- Sara Evans
- Brad Paisley

Sunday

- CrossCountry the Band
- Western Underground
- Miranda Lambert
- Chris Cagle
- Terri Clark

== See also ==
- List of country music festivals
- Country music
