= Zeandale Township, Kansas =

Township in Riley County, Kansas, U.S.

Zeandale Township
- Township
- Location within Riley County
- Coordinates: 39.093721°N 96.469854°W
- Country: United States
- State: Kansas
- County: Riley

Government
  - District 3 County Commissioner: John Ford (R)

Area
  - Total: 60.106 sq mi (155.67 km^{2})
  - Land: 59.58 sq mi (154.3 km^{2})
  - Water: 0.526 sq mi (1.36 km^{2}) 0.88%

Population (2020)
  - Total: 360
  - Density: 6.0/sq mi (2.3/km^{2})
- Time zone: UTC-6 (CST)
  - Summer (DST): UTC-5 (CDT)
- Area code: 785
- GNIS feature ID: 476384

Zeandale Township is a township in Riley County, Kansas, United States. As of the 2020 census, its population was 360.

== History ==
Originally, Zeandale Township was part of Wabaunsee County, but was transferred to Riley County in 1871. The first settlement in what would become the township was in fall of 1854.

== Geography ==
Zeandale Township covers an area of 60.106 square miles (155.67 square kilometers). The Kansas River flows through it.

=== Communities ===
- Zeandale

=== Adjacent townships ===
St. George Township, Pottawatomie County
Blue Township, Pottawatomie County	northwest	north
Ashland Township, Riley County; Manhattan Township, Riley County	west	self	east	Wabaunsee Township, Wabaunsee County
Jackson Township, Geary County	southwest	south	southeast	Alma Township, Wabaunsee County
Washington Township, Wabaunsee County

== Transportation ==
=== Major highways ===
- I-70
- US-40
- K-18
