= Ogden, Kansas =

City in Riley County, Kansas

- City
- Location of Ogden, Kansas

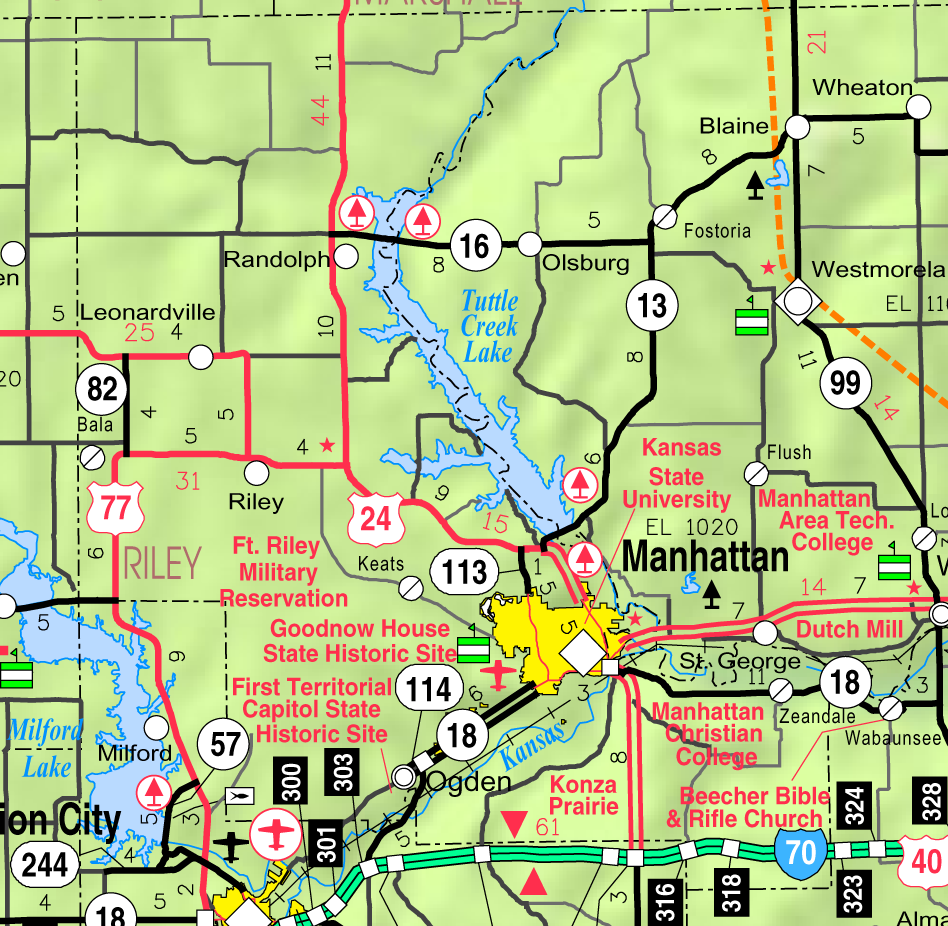
- KDOT map of Riley County (legend)
- Coordinates: 39°06′47″N 96°42′34″W
- Country: United States
- State: Kansas
- County: Riley

Area
  - Total: 1.73 sq mi (4.48 km^{2})
  - Land: 1.67 sq mi (4.33 km^{2})
  - Water: 0.058 sq mi (0.15 km^{2})
- Elevation: 1,047 ft (319 m)

Population (2020)
  - Total: 1,661
  - Density: 994/sq mi (384/km^{2})
- Time zone: UTC-6 (CST)
  - Summer (DST): UTC-5 (CDT)
- ZIP Code: 66517
- Area code: 785
- FIPS code: 20-52275
- GNIS ID: 2395307
- Website: ogden-ks.gov

Ogden is a city in Riley County, Kansas, United States. As of the 2020 census, the population of the city was 1,661. It is located near Fort Riley between Manhattan and Junction City.

== History ==
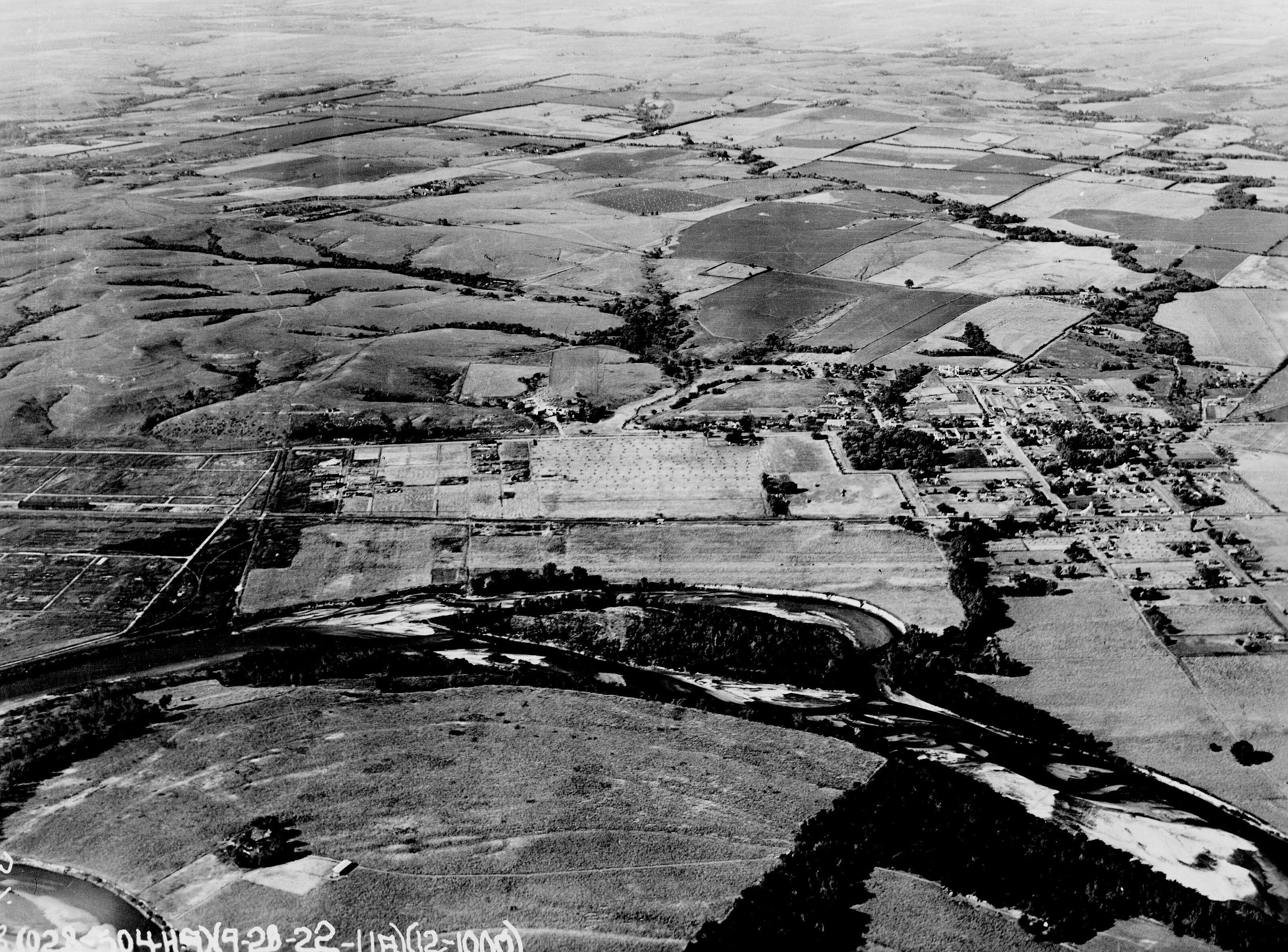
View of Ogden, 1920s

Ogden was founded about 1857. It was named for Major E. A. Ogden of the Army Corps of Engineers, a leader in building Fort Riley nearby. Ogden was incorporated as a city in 1870.

== Geography ==
According to the United States Census Bureau, the city has a total area of 1.66 square miles (4.30 km^{2}), of which 1.61 square miles (4.17 km^{2}) is land and 0.05 square miles (0.13 km^{2}) is water.

=== Climate ===
The climate in this area is characterized by hot, humid summers and generally mild to cool winters. According to the Köppen Climate Classification system, Ogden has a humid subtropical climate, abbreviated "Cfa" on climate maps.

== Demographics ==
Historical population
Census	Pop.	Note	%±
1890	173		—
1900	232		34.1%
1910	230		−0.9%
1920	596		159.1%
1930	418		−29.9%
1940	494		18.2%
1950	845		71.1%
1960	1,780		110.7%
1970	1,491		−16.2%
1980	1,804		21.0%
1990	1,494		−17.2%
2000	1,762		17.9%
2010	2,087		18.4%
2020	1,661		−20.4%
U.S. Decennial Census

Ogden is part of the Manhattan, Kansas Metropolitan Statistical Area.

=== 2020 census ===
As of the 2020 census, Ogden had a population of 1,661, including 699 households and 430 families. The median age was 30.1 years, and the age distribution was 25.2% under 18, 10.8% from 18 to 24, 36.1% from 25 to 44, 20.1% from 45 to 64, and 7.9% age 65 or older. For every 100 females there were 106.3 males, and for every 100 females age 18 and over there were 105.1 males age 18 and over.

98.6% of residents lived in urban areas, while 1.4% lived in rural areas.

Of the 699 households, 34.6% had children under the age of 18 living in them. Of all households, 45.1% were married-couple households, 25.9% were households with a male householder and no spouse or partner present, and 22.0% were households with a female householder and no spouse or partner present. About 30.3% of all households were made up of individuals and 7.5% had someone living alone who was 65 years of age or older. The average household size was 2.3 and the average family size was 2.8.

There were 923 housing units, of which 24.3% were vacant. The homeowner vacancy rate was 11.0% and the rental vacancy rate was 20.1%. The population density was 992.8 inhabitants per square mile (383.3/km^{2}), and there were 551.7 housing units per square mile (213.0/km^{2}).

The non-Hispanic white share of the population was 68.93%.

Racial composition as of the 2020 census
Race	Number	Percent
White	1,211	72.9%
Black or African American	125	7.5%
American Indian and Alaska Native	20	1.2%
Asian	46	2.8%
Native Hawaiian and Other Pacific Islander	1	0.1%
Some other race	60	3.6%
Two or more races	198	11.9%
Hispanic or Latino (of any race)	210	12.6%

=== Demographic estimates ===
The percent of those with a bachelor's degree or higher was estimated to be 13.3% of the population.

The 2016–2020 5-year American Community Survey estimates show that the median household income was $41,190 (with a margin of error of +/- $9,514) and the median family income was $48,864 (+/- $9,241). Males had a median income of $40,192 (+/- $7,212) versus $20,052 (+/- $8,316) for females. The median income for those above 16 years old was $32,594 (+/- $6,460). Approximately, 15.1% of families and 14.5% of the population were below the poverty line, including 24.9% of those under the age of 18 and 2.7% of those ages 65 or over.

=== 2010 census ===
As of the census of 2010, there were 2,087 people, 823 households, and 551 families living in the city. The population density was 1,296.3 inhabitants per square mile (500.5/km^{2}). There were 992 housing units at an average density of 616.1 per square mile (237.9/km^{2}). The racial makeup of the city was 76.8% White, 11.2% African American, 1.2% Native American, 1.7% Asian, 0.2% Pacific Islander, 2.6% from other races, and 6.2% from two or more races. Hispanic or Latino of any race were 9.4% of the population.

There were 823 households, of which 43.3% had children under the age of 18 living with them, 48.4% were married couples living together, 13.4% had a female householder with no husband present, 5.2% had a male householder with no wife present, and 33.0% were non-families. 27.0% of all households were made up of individuals, and 3.6% had someone living alone who was 65 years of age or older. The average household size was 2.54 and the average family size was 3.08.

The median age in the city was 26.5 years. 30.6% of residents were under the age of 18; 14.2% were between the ages of 18 and 24; 35.1% were from 25 to 44; 15.7% were from 45 to 64; and 4.3% were 65 years of age or older. The gender makeup of the city was 50.7% male and 49.3% female.

=== 2000 census ===
As of the census of 2000, there were 1,762 people, 690 households, and 462 families living in the city. The population density was 2,337.8 inhabitants per square mile (902.6/km^{2}). There were 851 housing units at an average density of 1,129.1 per square mile (435.9/km^{2}). The racial makeup of the city was 76.16% White, 12.26% African American, 0.68% Native American, 2.10% Asian, 0.17% Pacific Islander, 3.01% from other races, and 5.62% from two or more races. Hispanic or Latino of any race were 7.89% of the population.

There were 690 households, out of which 41.3% had children under the age of 18 living with them, 52.3% were married couples living together, 12.0% had a female householder with no husband present, and 32.9% were non-families. 27.0% of all households were made up of individuals, and 5.1% had someone living alone who was 65 years of age or older. The average household size was 2.55 and the average family size was 3.12.

In the city, the population was spread out, with 32.0% under the age of 18, 14.4% from 18 to 24, 34.7% from 25 to 44, 13.1% from 45 to 64, and 5.9% who were 65 years of age or older. The median age was 27 years. For every 100 females, there were 102.8 males. For every 100 females age 18 and over, there were 95.6 males.

The median income for a household in the city was $26,750, and the median income for a family was $31,375. Males had a median income of $25,463 versus $19,471 for females. The per capita income for the city was $12,287. About 17.5% of families and 17.6% of the population were below the poverty line, including 17.1% of those under age 18 and 9.2% of those age 65 or over.

== Education ==
The community is served by Manhattan-Ogden USD 383 public school district.

== See also ==
- Fort Riley
