= Wildcat Township, Riley County, Kansas =

Township in Riley County, Kansas, U.S.

Wildcat Township
- Township
- Location within Riley County
- Coordinates: 39.244441°N 96.698048°W
- Country: United States
- State: Kansas
- County: Riley

Government
  - District 3 County Commissioner: Kathryn Focke (D)

Area
  - Total: 29.038 sq mi (75.21 km^{2})
  - Land: 29.007 sq mi (75.13 km^{2})
  - Water: 0.031 sq mi (0.080 km^{2}) 0.11%

Population (2020)
  - Total: 786
  - Density: 27.1/sq mi (10.5/km^{2})
- Time zone: UTC-6 (CST)
  - Summer (DST): UTC-5 (CDT)
- Area code: 785
- GNIS feature ID: 476212

Wildcat Township is a township in Riley County, Kansas, United States. As of the 2020 census, its population was 786.

== Geography ==
Wildcat Township covers an area of 29.038 square miles (75.21 square kilometers).

=== Communities ===
- Keats

=== Adjacent townships ===
Grant Township, Riley County
		north
Madison Township, Riley County	west	self	east	Manhattan Township, Riley County
		south
Ogden Township, Riley County

== Transportation ==
=== Major highways ===
- US-24
