= Bala, Kansas =

Unincorporated community in Riley County, Kansas

- CDP
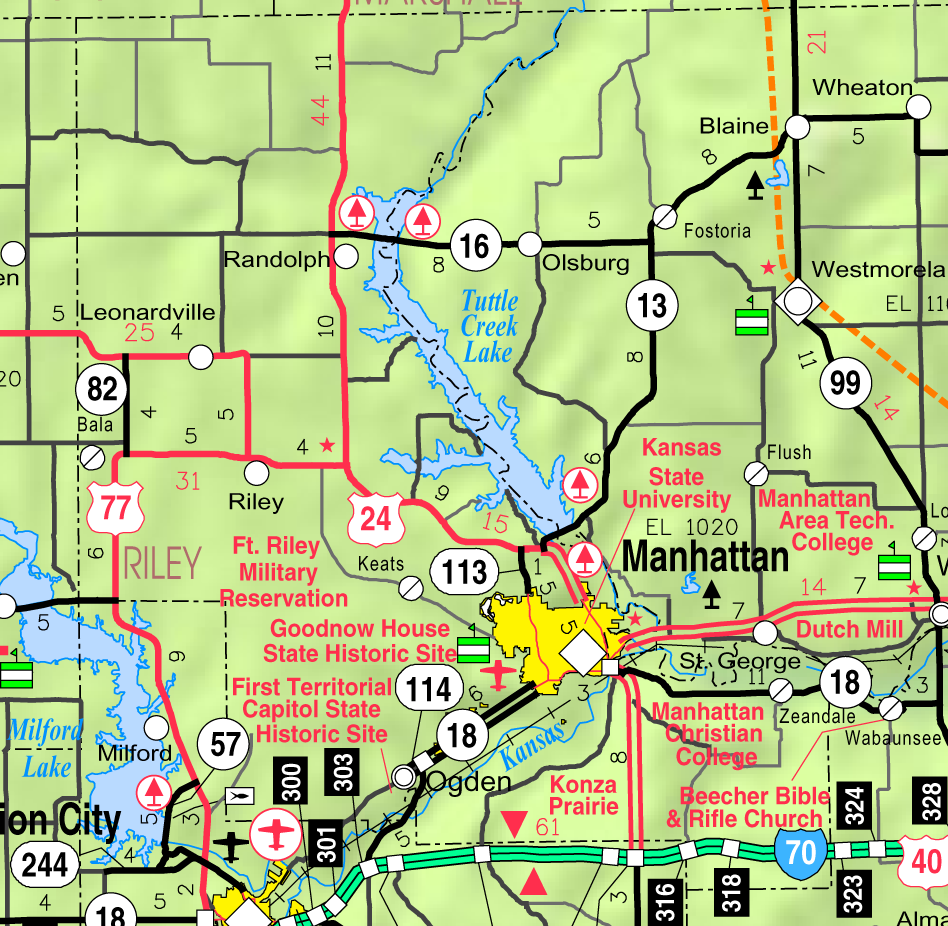
- KDOT map of Riley County (legend)

- Location within Kansas Location within the United States
- Coordinates: 39°18′39″N 96°57′01″W
- Country: United States
- State: Kansas
- Counties: Riley
- Founded: 1862
- Named for: Bala
- Elevation: 1,293 ft (394 m)

Population (2020)
  - Total: 29
- Time zone: UTC-6 (CST)
  - Summer (DST): UTC-5 (CDT)
- Area code: 785
- FIPS code: 20-03800
- GNIS ID: 2804655

Bala is a census-designated place (CDP) in Bala Township, Riley County, Kansas, United States. As of the 2020 census, the population was 29.

== History ==
Bala was settled circa 1862. It was a shipping point on the Chicago, Rock Island and Pacific Railroad. The community is named after Bala, in Wales.

A post office was opened in Bala in 1871, and remained in operation until it was discontinued in 1966.

== Demographics ==
Historical population
Census	Pop.	Note	%±
2020	29		—
U.S. Decennial Census

== Education ==
The community is served by Riley County USD 378 public school district.
