= Center Township, Riley County, Kansas =

Township in Riley County, Kansas, U.S.

Center Township
- Township
- Location within Riley County
- Coordinates: 39.474364°N 96.876415°W
- Country: United States
- State: Kansas
- County: Riley

Government
  - District 2 County Commissioner: Greg McKinley (R)

Area
  - Total: 31.6 sq mi (82 km^{2})
  - Land: 31.593 sq mi (81.83 km^{2})
  - Water: 0.007 sq mi (0.018 km^{2}) 0.02%

Population (2020)
  - Total: 81
  - Density: 2.6/sq mi (0.99/km^{2})
- Time zone: UTC-6 (CST)
  - Summer (DST): UTC-5 (CDT)
- Area code: 785
- GNIS feature ID: 473377

Center Township is a township in Riley County, Kansas, United States. As of the 2020 census, its population was 81.

== Geography ==
Center Township covers an area of 31.6 square miles (82 square kilometers).

=== Communities ===
- May Day
- Winkler

=== Adjacent townships ===
May Day Township, Riley County
Goshen Township, Clay County	northwest	north	northeast	Swede Creek Township, Riley County
		self	east	Jackson Township, Riley County
Highland Township, Clay County	southwest	south
Fancy Creek Township, Riley County
