= Grant Township, Clay County, Kansas =

Grant Township
- Township
- Location in Clay County
- Coordinates: 39°16′30″N 096°59′51″W
- Country: United States
- State: Kansas
- County: Clay

Area
  - Total: 33.70 sq mi (87.28 km^{2})
  - Land: 28.70 sq mi (74.34 km^{2})
  - Water: 5.00 sq mi (12.94 km^{2}) 14.83%
- Elevation: 1,152 ft (351 m)

Population (2020)
  - Total: 171
  - Density: 5.96/sq mi (2.30/km^{2})
- GNIS feature ID: 0476192

Grant Township is a township in Clay County, Kansas, United States. As of the 2020 census, its population was 171.

== Geography ==
Grant Township covers an area of 33.7 square miles (87 km^{2}) and contains no incorporated settlements. According to the USGS, it contains one cemetery, Timber Creek.

The streams of Mall Creek, Timber Creek and West Branch Mall Creek run through this township.
