= Jackson Township, Riley County, Kansas =

Township in Riley County, Kansas, U.S.

Jackson Township
- Township
- Location within Riley County
- Coordinates: 39.454527°N 96.755648°W
- Country: United States
- State: Kansas
- County: Riley
- Established: 1859

Government
  - District 2 County Commissioner: Greg McKinley (R)

Area
  - Total: 35.958 sq mi (93.13 km^{2})
  - Land: 32.006 sq mi (82.90 km^{2})
  - Water: 3.952 sq mi (10.24 km^{2}) 10.99%

Population (2020)
  - Total: 273
  - Density: 8.53/sq mi (3.29/km^{2})
- Time zone: UTC-6 (CST)
  - Summer (DST): UTC-5 (CDT)
- Area code: 785
- GNIS feature ID: 473384

Jackson Township is a township in Riley County, Kansas, United States. As of the 2020 census, its population was 273.

== History ==
The first settlements in the area were made in early 1855 by Gardiner Randolph and his sons near the mouth of Fancy Creek. Jackson Township was first organized in 1859.

== Geography ==
Jackson Township covers an area of 35.958 square miles (93.13 square kilometers). Part of Tuttle Creek Lake and its state park lies within the township, and thus the Big Blue River flows through it as well.

=== Communities ===
- Randolph

=== Adjacent townships ===
Swede Creek Township, Riley County
May Day Township, Riley County	northwest	north
Center Township, Riley County	west	self	east	Blue Valley Township, Pottawatomie County
Fancy Creek Township, Riley County	southwest	south
Sherman Township, Riley County

== Transportation ==
=== Major highways ===
- US-77
- K-16
