= Jefferson Township, Geary County, Kansas =

Jefferson Township
- Township
- Location in Geary County
- Coordinates: 39°00′02″N 096°45′41″W
- Country: United States
- State: Kansas
- County: Geary

Area
  - Total: 48.44 sq mi (125.46 km^{2})
  - Land: 47.69 sq mi (123.51 km^{2})
  - Water: 0.75 sq mi (1.95 km^{2}) 1.55%
- Elevation: 1,289 ft (393 m)

Population (2020)
  - Total: 2,159
  - Density: 45.27/sq mi (17.48/km^{2})
- GNIS feature ID: 0476710

Jefferson Township is a township in Geary County, Kansas, United States. As of the 2020 census, its population was 2,159.

== History ==
Jefferson Township was established in 1878. It was named for Thomas Jefferson.

== Geography ==
Jefferson Township covers an area of 48.44 square miles (125.5 km^{2}) and contains one incorporated settlement, Grandview Plaza. According to the USGS, it contains two cemeteries: Fairview and Rosey.

Whiskey Lake is within this township. The streams of Clarks Creek, Davis Creek, Dry Creek, Franks Creek and Humboldt Creek run through this township.

== Transportation ==
Jefferson Township contains one airport or landing strip, Marshall Airfield.
