= Wingfield Township, Kansas =

Wingfield Township
- Township
- Location in Geary County
- Coordinates: 39°00′55″N 096°39′01″W
- Country: United States
- State: Kansas
- County: Geary

Area
  - Total: 47.61 sq mi (123.32 km^{2})
  - Land: 47.61 sq mi (123.32 km^{2})
  - Water: 0 sq mi (0 km^{2}) 0%
- Elevation: 1,368 ft (417 m)

Population (2000)
  - Total: 163
  - Density: 3.42/sq mi (1.32/km^{2})
- GNIS feature ID: 0476722

Wingfield Township is a township in Geary County, Kansas, United States. As of the 2020 census, its population was 163.

== Geography ==
Wingfield Township covers an area of 47.61 square miles (123.3 km^{2}) and contains no incorporated settlements. According to the USGS, it contains two cemeteries: Humboldt and Saint Joseph's.

The streams of East McDowell Creek, MacArthur Branch, Pressee Branch, Swede Creek, Thierer Branch and West McDowell Creek run through this township.
