= Jackson Township, Geary County, Kansas =

Jackson Township
- Township
- Location in Geary County
- Coordinates: 39°00′55″N 096°32′46″W
- Country: United States
- State: Kansas
- County: Geary

Area
  - Total: 40.34 sq mi (104.48 km^{2})
  - Land: 40.34 sq mi (104.48 km^{2})
  - Water: 0 sq mi (0 km^{2}) 0%
- Elevation: 1,250 ft (381 m)

Population (2020)
  - Total: 96
  - Density: 2.4/sq mi (0.92/km^{2})
- GNIS feature ID: 0476721

Jackson Township is a township in Geary County, Kansas, United States. As of the 2020 census, its population was 96.

== History ==
Jackson Township was organized in 1872. It was named for President Andrew Jackson.

== Geography ==
Jackson Township covers an area of 40.34 square miles (104.5 km^{2}) and contains no incorporated settlements. According to the USGS, it contains one cemetery, Briggs.

The streams of Briggs Branch, Deadman Creek, Horne Branch and Poole Branch run through this township.
