= Riley County, Kansas =

County in Kansas, United States

- County
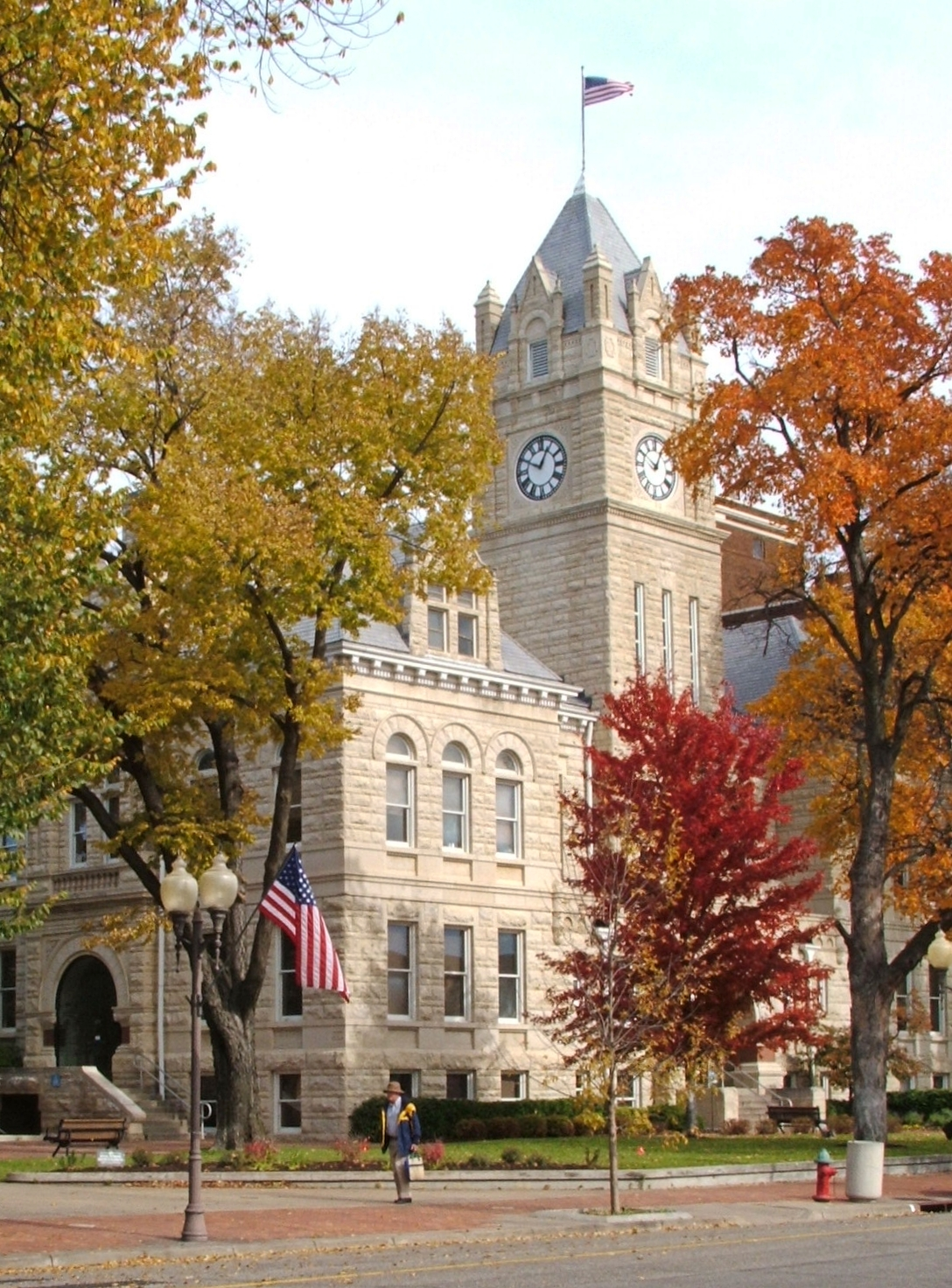
- Riley County Courthouse in Manhattan (2005)

- Flag

- Location within the U.S. state of Kansas
- Coordinates: 39°06′47″N 96°37′41″W
- Country: United States
- State: Kansas
- Founded: August 25, 1855
- Named for: Bennet C. Riley
- Seat: Manhattan
- Largest city: Manhattan

Area
  - Total: 622 sq mi (1,610 km^{2})
  - Land: 610 sq mi (1,600 km^{2})
  - Water: 12 sq mi (31 km^{2}) 2.0%

Population (2020)
  - Total: 71,959
  - Estimate (2025): 72,598 ▲
  - Density: 118/sq mi (46/km^{2})
- Time zone: UTC−6 (Central)
  - Summer (DST): UTC−5 (CDT)
- Congressional district: 1st
- Website: rileycountyks.gov

Riley County is a county located in the U.S. state of Kansas. Its county seat and largest city is Manhattan. As of the 2020 census, the population was 71,959. The county was named after Bennet Riley, the 7th governor of California, and a Mexican–American War hero. Riley County is home to Fort Riley and Kansas State University.

== History ==
Riley County, named for Mexican–American War general Bennet Riley, was on the western edge of the 33 original counties established by the Kansas Territorial Legislature in August 1855. For organizational purposes, Riley County initially had attached to it Geary County and all land west of Riley County, across Kansas Territory into present-day Colorado.

The first Territorial Capital of Kansas Territory was located in the boundaries of Riley County, in the former town of Pawnee. The site now falls within the boundaries of Fort Riley, a U.S. Army post.

Manhattan was selected as county seat in contentious fashion. In late 1857, an election was held to select the county seat, with Ogden prevailing. However, Manhattanites suspected election fraud, and were eventually able to prove that a number of votes were illegally cast. Sheriff David A. Butterfield was forced to secure the county's books and records for Manhattan, and Manhattan was finally officially declared the county seat in 1858.

On May 30, 1879, the "Irving, Kansas Tornado" began in Riley County. This tornado is estimated to have been an F4 on the Fujita scale, with a damage path 800 yards (700 m) wide and 100 miles (200 km) long. Eighteen people were killed and sixty were injured.

== Geography ==
According to the United States Census Bureau, the county has a total area of 622 square miles (1,610 km^{2}), of which 610 square miles (1,600 km^{2}) is land and 12 square miles (31 km^{2}) (2.0%) is water.

The eastern border of the county follows the former course of the Big Blue River. The river was dammed in the 1960s and Tuttle Creek Lake was created as a result. The county falls within the Flint Hills region of the state.

=== Adjacent counties ===
- Marshall County (northeast)
- Pottawatomie County (east)
- Wabaunsee County (southeast)
- Geary County (south)
- Clay County (west)
- Washington County (northwest)

== Demographics ==
Historical population
Census	Pop.	Note	%±
1860	1,224		—
1870	5,105		317.1%
1880	10,430		104.3%
1890	13,183		26.4%
1900	13,828		4.9%
1910	15,783		14.1%
1920	20,650		30.8%
1930	19,882		−3.7%
1940	20,617		3.7%
1950	33,405		62.0%
1960	41,914		25.5%
1970	56,788		35.5%
1980	63,505		11.8%
1990	67,139		5.7%
2000	62,843		−6.4%
2010	71,115		13.2%
2020	71,959		1.2%
2025 (est.)	72,598	▲	0.9%
U.S. Decennial Census; 1790-1960 1900-1990; 1990-2000 2010-2020

Riley County is part of the Manhattan, Kansas Metropolitan Statistical Area. People aged 15 to 34 years old make up 53.6% of the population of Riley County, one of the highest rates in the United States.

=== Racial and ethnic composition ===
Riley County, Kansas – Racial and ethnic composition Note: the U.S. Census treats Hispanic/Latino as an ethnic category. This table excludes Latinos from the racial categories and assigns them to a separate category. Hispanics/Latinos may be of any race.
Race / Ethnicity (NH = Non-Hispanic)	Pop 1980	Pop 1990	Pop 2000	Pop 2010	Pop 2020	% 1980	% 1990	% 2000	% 2010	% 2020
White alone (NH)	51,849	54,787	51,954	56,571	51,807	81.65%	81.60%	82.67%	79.55%	72.00%
Black or African American alone (NH)	6,667	6,682	4,221	4,344	4,759	10.50%	9.95%	6.72%	6.11%	6.61%
Native American or Alaska Native alone (NH)	373	444	361	364	305	0.59%	0.66%	0.57%	0.51%	0.42%
Asian alone (NH)	1,394	2,343	2,001	2,960	3,325	2.20%	3.49%	3.18%	4.16%	4.62%
Native Hawaiian or Pacific Islander alone (NH)	x	x	96	129	224	x	x	0.15%	0.18%	0.31%
Other race alone (NH)	723	84	93	115	413	1.14%	0.13%	0.15%	0.16%	0.57%
Mixed race or Multiracial (NH)	x	x	1,245	2,022	3,656	x	x	1.98%	2.84%	5.08%
Hispanic or Latino (any race)	2,499	2,799	2,872	4,610	7,470	3.94%	4.17%	4.57%	6.48%	10.38%
Total	63,505	67,139	62,843	71,115	71,959	100.00%	100.00%	100.00%	100.00%	100.00%

=== 2020 census ===
As of the 2020 census, the county had a population of 71,959. The median age was 25.3 years. 17.1% of residents were under the age of 18 and 10.2% of residents were 65 years of age or older. For every 100 females there were 112.6 males, and for every 100 females age 18 and over there were 113.4 males age 18 and over.

The racial makeup of the county was 75.8% White, 7.0% Black or African American, 0.6% American Indian and Alaska Native, 4.7% Asian, 0.3% Native Hawaiian and Pacific Islander, 3.2% from some other race, and 8.4% from two or more races. Hispanic or Latino residents of any race comprised 10.4% of the population.

90.2% of residents lived in urban areas, while 9.8% lived in rural areas.

There were 26,711 households in the county, of which 24.6% had children under the age of 18 living with them and 27.1% had a female householder with no spouse or partner present. About 32.7% of all households were made up of individuals and 7.2% had someone living alone who was 65 years of age or older.

There were 30,477 housing units, of which 12.4% were vacant. Among occupied housing units, 42.5% were owner-occupied and 57.5% were renter-occupied. The homeowner vacancy rate was 3.0% and the rental vacancy rate was 11.4%.

=== 2000 census ===
As of the census of 2000, there were 62,843 people, 22,137 households, and 12,263 families residing in the county. The population density was 103 inhabitants per square mile (40/km^{2}). There were 23,397 housing units at an average density of 38 per square mile (15/km^{2}). The racial makeup of the county was 84.78% White, 6.88% Black or African American, 0.63% Native American, 3.22% Asian, 0.17% Pacific Islander, 1.89% from other races, and 2.43% from two or more races. 4.57% of the population were Hispanic or Latino of any race.

There were 22,137 households, out of which 27.80% had children under the age of 18 living with them, 46.20% were married couples living together, 6.80% had a female householder with no husband present, and 44.60% were non-families. 27.50% of all households were made up of individuals, and 6.10% had someone living alone who was 65 years of age or older. The average household size was 2.42 and the average family size was 2.99.

In the county, the population was spread out, with 18.80% under the age of 18, 34.50% from 18 to 24, 25.90% from 25 to 44, 13.30% from 45 to 64, and 7.50% who were 65 years of age or older. The median age was 24 years. For every 100 females, there were 114.30 males. For every 100 females age 18 and over, there were 115.40 males.

The median income for a household in the county was $32,042, and the median income for a family was $46,489. Males had a median income of $26,856 versus $23,835 for females. The per capita income for the county was $16,349. About 8.50% of families and 20.60% of the population were below the poverty line, including 11.20% of those under age 18 and 6.70% of those age 65 or over.

== Government ==
Riley County is governed by three county commissioners, John Ford, Marvin Rodriguez, and Ron Wells.

=== Presidential elections ===
Presidential election results

United States presidential election results for Riley County, Kansas
Year	Republican		Democratic		Third party(ies)	
Year	No.	%	No.	%	No.	%
1880	1,484	67.21%	377	17.07%	347	15.72%
1884	1,686	64.33%	644	24.57%	291	11.10%
1888	1,856	62.49%	772	25.99%	342	11.52%
1892	1,574	51.67%	0	0.00%	1,472	48.33%
1896	1,890	55.87%	1,443	42.65%	50	1.48%
1900	2,119	61.69%	1,279	37.23%	37	1.08%
1904	2,251	75.26%	523	17.49%	217	7.26%
1908	2,276	61.71%	1,289	34.95%	123	3.34%
1912	425	11.14%	1,170	30.67%	2,220	58.19%
1916	3,320	52.34%	2,637	41.57%	386	6.09%
1920	4,875	73.57%	1,610	24.30%	141	2.13%
1924	5,455	70.03%	1,646	21.13%	689	8.84%
1928	6,592	77.91%	1,791	21.17%	78	0.92%
1932	5,337	54.65%	4,101	42.00%	327	3.35%
1936	6,077	59.11%	4,104	39.92%	99	0.96%
1940	7,420	68.59%	3,293	30.44%	105	0.97%
1944	6,511	70.43%	2,659	28.76%	74	0.80%
1948	9,227	68.01%	4,052	29.87%	288	2.12%
1952	9,799	80.31%	2,352	19.28%	50	0.41%
1956	9,385	76.84%	2,784	22.80%	44	0.36%
1960	9,068	71.97%	3,482	27.63%	50	0.40%
1964	6,396	52.70%	5,597	46.12%	144	1.19%
1968	8,296	62.17%	4,258	31.91%	791	5.93%
1972	11,120	66.16%	5,333	31.73%	356	2.12%
1976	9,518	57.45%	6,540	39.47%	510	3.08%
1980	8,904	52.94%	5,224	31.06%	2,690	15.99%
1984	11,308	64.77%	5,975	34.22%	175	1.00%
1988	9,507	55.90%	7,283	42.82%	217	1.28%
1992	8,394	38.51%	7,933	36.39%	5,470	25.10%
1996	11,113	56.68%	6,746	34.41%	1,748	8.92%
2000	10,672	58.47%	6,188	33.90%	1,393	7.63%
2004	12,672	60.60%	7,908	37.82%	331	1.58%
2008	12,111	52.43%	10,495	45.43%	494	2.14%
2012	11,507	54.53%	8,977	42.54%	617	2.92%
2016	10,107	46.94%	9,341	43.38%	2,084	9.68%
2020	11,610	46.12%	12,765	50.71%	796	3.16%
2024	11,630	47.83%	12,063	49.62%	620	2.55%

Owing to its history of Yankee anti-slavery settlement in “Bleeding Kansas” days, Riley County became strongly Republican following Kansas statehood, except when over half of its voters supported Progressive Theodore Roosevelt in 1912 who himself was a Republican who had broken away from the party in that election cycle. Being relatively resistant to the Democratic populism of William Jennings Bryan, Woodrow Wilson and Franklin D. Roosevelt, Riley County stood as the westernmost of thirty-eight U.S. counties to have never voted Democratic for President since the Civil War. However, it was the only one whose status as “never Democratic” stood significantly threatened in 2016: Hillary Clinton's losing margin of only 3.5 percent was the second-closest any Democrat has come to claiming the county behind her husband in the divided 1992 election.

In the 2018 Kansas gubernatorial election, Democratic candidate Laura Kelly won Riley County by a 24-point margin, and in the 2018 U.S. House Election in KS-01, Republican candidate Roger Marshall lost Riley County by a 2-point margin.

Even though he lost Kansas in 2020, Joe Biden won Riley County 50.7% to 46.1%, becoming the first Democratic presidential win in Riley County's history. In 2024, Donald Trump became the first Republican to win a presidential election without carrying Riley, as the county narrowly voted for Democratic nominee Kamala Harris.

=== Laws ===
Riley County is the only county in Kansas without an elected sheriff; the county police department handles all the sheriff's functions.

Riley County was a prohibition, or "dry", county until the Kansas Constitution was amended in 1986 and voters approved the sale of alcoholic liquor by the individual drink with a 30 percent food sales requirement. The food sales requirement was removed with voter approval in 2004.

The county voted "No" on the 2022 Kansas abortion referendum, an anti-abortion ballot measure, by 68% to 32%, outpacing its support of Joe Biden during the 2020 presidential election.

== Education ==
=== Colleges and universities ===
- Kansas State University
- Manhattan Christian College
- Manhattan Area Technical College

=== Unified school districts ===
School districts with offices in the county include:

- Riley County USD 378
- Manhattan-Ogden USD 383
- Blue Valley USD 384

Others:

- Clay Center USD 379
- Geary County Schools USD 475
- Mill Creek Valley USD 329
- Rock Creek USD 323
- Valley Heights USD 498
- Wamego USD 320

== Communities ==
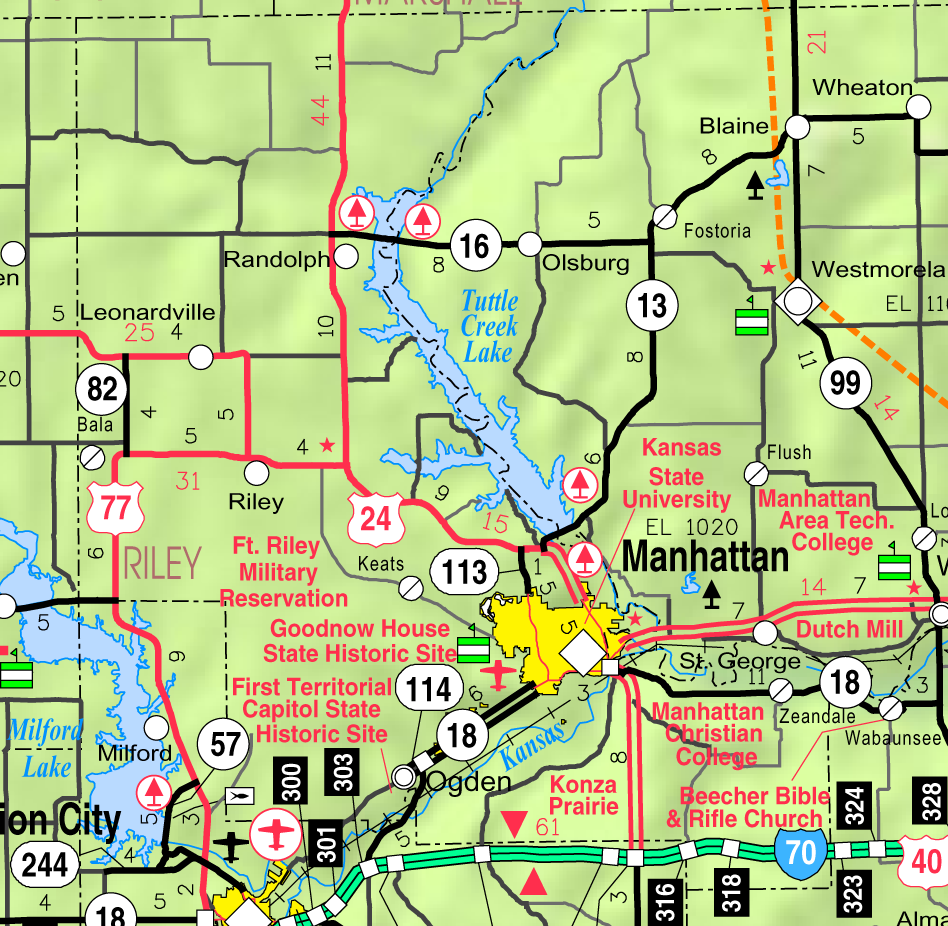
2005 map of Riley County (map legend)

List of townships / incorporated cities / unincorporated communities / extinct former communities within Riley County.

=== Cities ===
‡ means a community has portions in an adjacent county.

- Leonardville
- Manhattan‡ (county seat)
- Ogden
- Randolph
- Riley

=== Unincorporated communities ===
† means a community is designated a Census-Designated Place (CDP) by the United States Census Bureau.

- Bala†
- Fort Riley†‡ (formerly "Fort Riley North")
- Keats†
- Lasita
- May Day
- Walsburg
- Winkler
- Zeandale†

=== Former communities ===
These former places were flooded when Tuttle Creek Lake was created in the 1950s to 1960s. Randolph (above) was also flooded, but moved a mile west of its original location.

- Cleburne
- Garrison Cross
- Stockdale
- Winkler

=== Fort Riley ===
Located north of the junction of the Smoky Hill and Republican rivers in Geary County, Fort Riley Military Reservation covers 100,656 acres (407 km^{2}) in Geary and Riley counties. The fort has a daytime population of nearly 25,000 and includes a census-designated place.

=== Townships ===
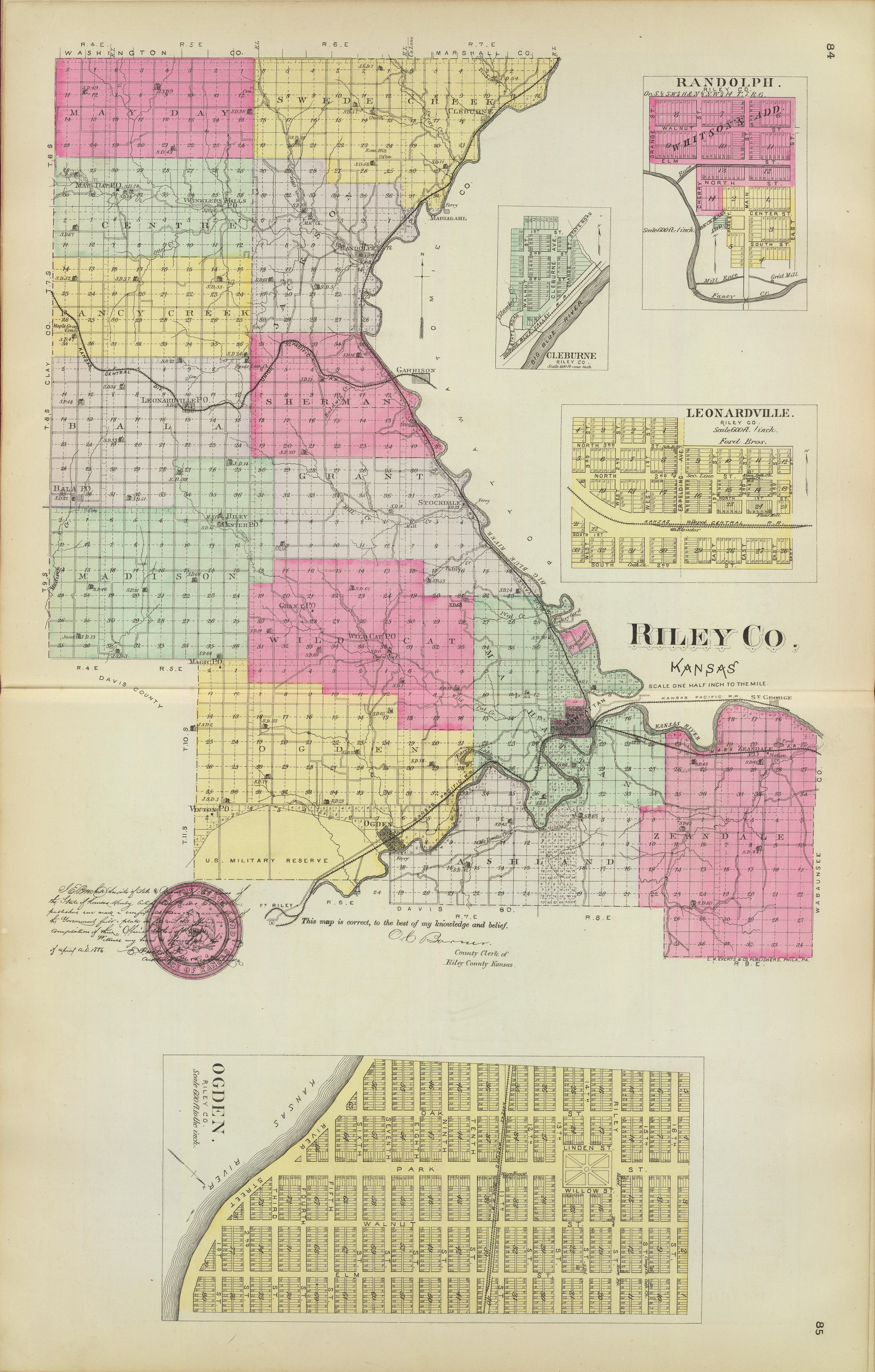
Riley County Township map (1887)

Riley County is divided into fourteen townships. The city of Manhattan which is surrounded by Manhattan Township is considered governmentally independent and is excluded from the census figures for Manhattan Township or any other townships. In the following table, the population center is the largest city (or cities) included in that township's population total, if it is of a significant size.

Sources: 2000 U.S. Gazetteer from the U.S. Census Bureau.
Township	FIPS	Population center	Population	Population density /km^{2} (/sq mi)	Land area km^{2} (sq mi)	Water area km^{2} (sq mi)	Water %	Geographic coordinates
Ashland	02725		150	2 (4)	89 (35)	1 (0)	0.75%	39°6′48″N 96°37′42″W
Bala	03825	Leonardville	762	7 (18)	108 (42)	0 (0)	0.12%	39°20′34″N 96°53′47″W
Center	12100		81	1 (3)	82 (32)	0 (0)	0.04%	39°29′22″N 96°52′54″W
Fancy Creek	22950		126	2 (4)	83 (32)	0 (0)	0.07%	39°24′55″N 96°53′14″W
Grant	28075		833	9 (23)	92 (35)	7 (3)	7.38%	39°17′52″N 96°41′31″W
Jackson	34900	Randolph	326	4 (10)	84 (32)	10 (4)	10.30%	39°26′43″N 96°45′1″W
Madison	44125	Fort Riley CDP (part)	8,173	22 (58)	366 (141)	0 (0)	0.11%	39°15′32″N 96°50′26″W
Manhattan	44275		3,275	37 (95)	89 (35)	3 (1)	3.28%	39°12′45″N 96°35′46″W
May Day	45225		78	1 (2)	81 (31)	0 (0)	0.04%	39°32′39″N 96°53′41″W
Ogden	52300	Ogden	2,423	69 (178)	35 (14)	1 (0)	2.32%	39°7′6″N 96°41′54″W
Sherman	65075		524	7 (18)	76 (29)	5 (2)	6.06%	39°22′30″N 96°43′58″W
Swede Creek	69650	Cleburne (hist.)	157	1 (3)	125 (48)	4 (1)	3.00%	39°32′24″N 96°42′9″W
Wildcat	79175		750	10 (25)	77 (30)	0 (0)	0.10%	39°13′26″N 96°42′28″W
Zeandale	80900		357	2 (6)	154 (60)	2 (1)	0.97%	39°7′39″N 96°27′19″W

== Notable people ==
Among notable current and former residents of Riley County are former Governor John W. Carlin, General Glen Edgerton, millionaire miner Horace A. W. Tabor, NFL receiver Jordy Nelson.

== See also ==
- Pillsbury Crossing
- National Register of Historic Places listings in Riley County, Kansas

Community information for Kansas

- Kansas locations by per capita income
- List of counties in Kansas
- List of townships in Kansas
- List of cities in Kansas
- List of unincorporated communities in Kansas
- List of ghost towns in Kansas
