= Big Blue River (Kansas River tributary) =

River in Nebraska and Kansas

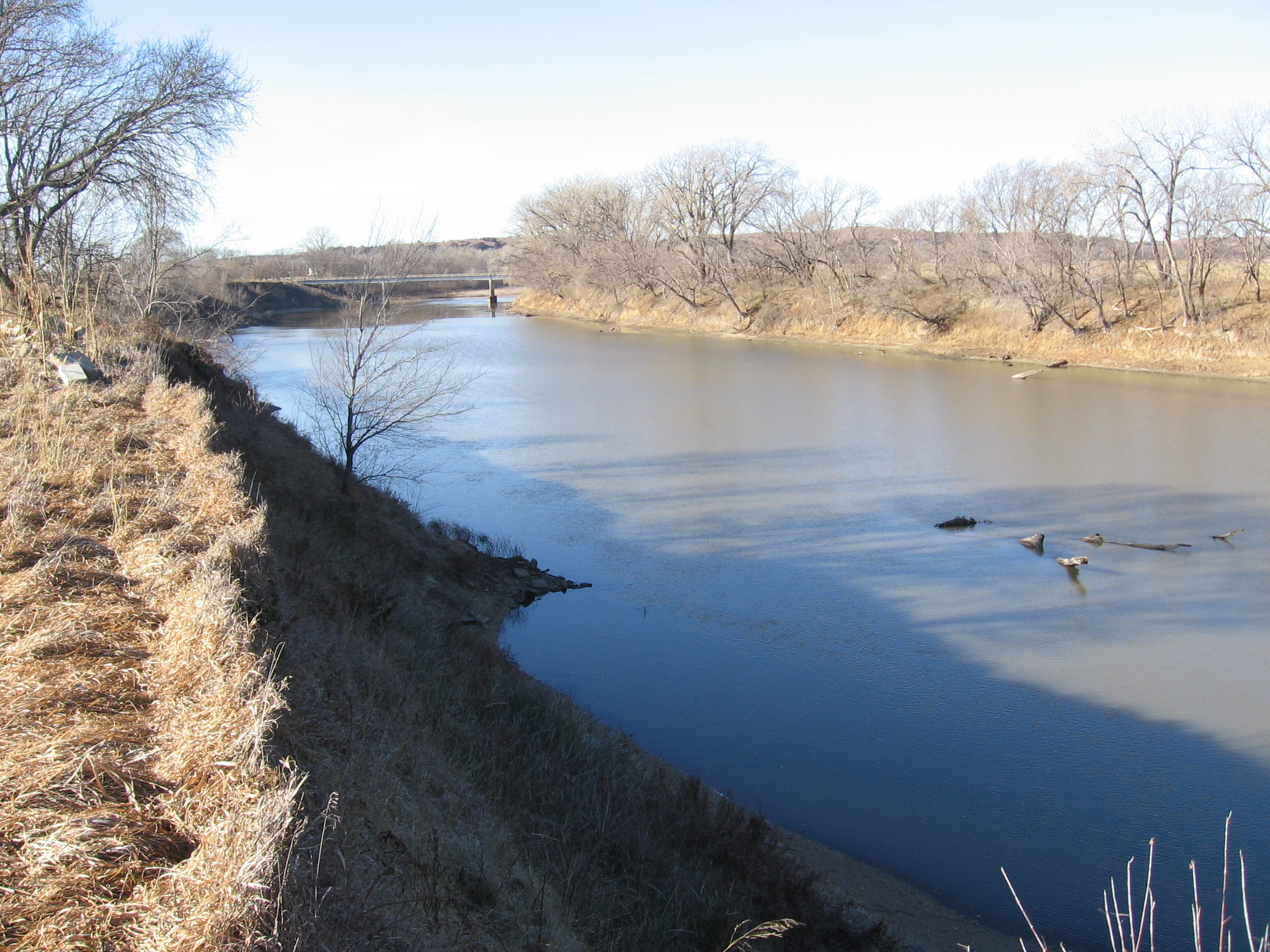
- Big Blue River above Manhattan, Kansas, December 2006

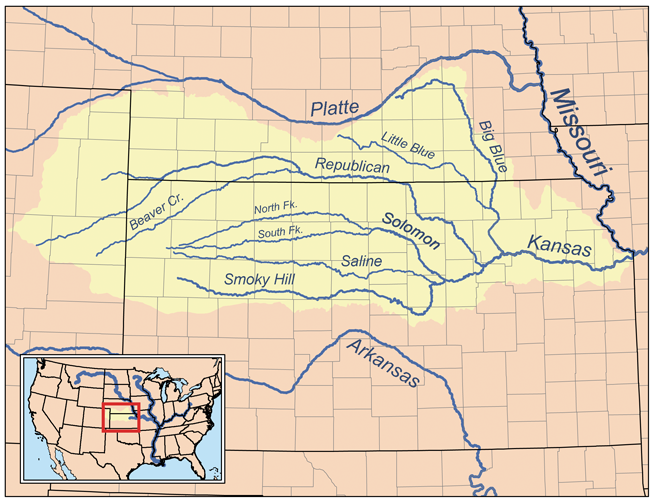
- Map of the Kansas River drainage basin showing the Big Blue and Little Blue rivers
- Native name: Great Blue Earth River (Kansa)

Location
- Country: United States
- State: Nebraska, Kansas
- Region: Great Plains
- Cities: Manhattan, KS, Beatrice, NE, Crete, NE, Seward, NE

Physical characteristics
- Source
  - location: Near Aurora, NE, Great Plains, United States
  - coordinates: 40°57′00″N 098°04′31″W
- Mouth: Kansas River
  - location: Near Manhattan, Great Plains, United States
  - coordinates: 39°11′17″N 096°31′40″W
- Length: 359 mi (578 km), South
- Basin size: 9,696 sq mi (25,110 km^{2})
- Discharge
  - location: Manhattan, KS
  - average: 982 cu ft/s (27.8 m^{3}/s)
  - minimum: 8 cu ft/s (0.23 m^{3}/s)
  - maximum: 18,000 cu ft/s (510 m^{3}/s)

Basin features
- River system: Kansas River watershed
- Tributaries
  - left: Little Blue River, West Fork of the Little Blue River

The Big Blue River is the largest tributary of the Kansas River. The river flows for approximately 359 miles (578 km) from central Nebraska into Kansas, until its confluence with the Kansas River at Manhattan.

It was given its name by the Kansa tribe of Native Americans, who lived at its mouth from 1780 to 1830, and who called it the Great Blue Earth River.

== River course ==
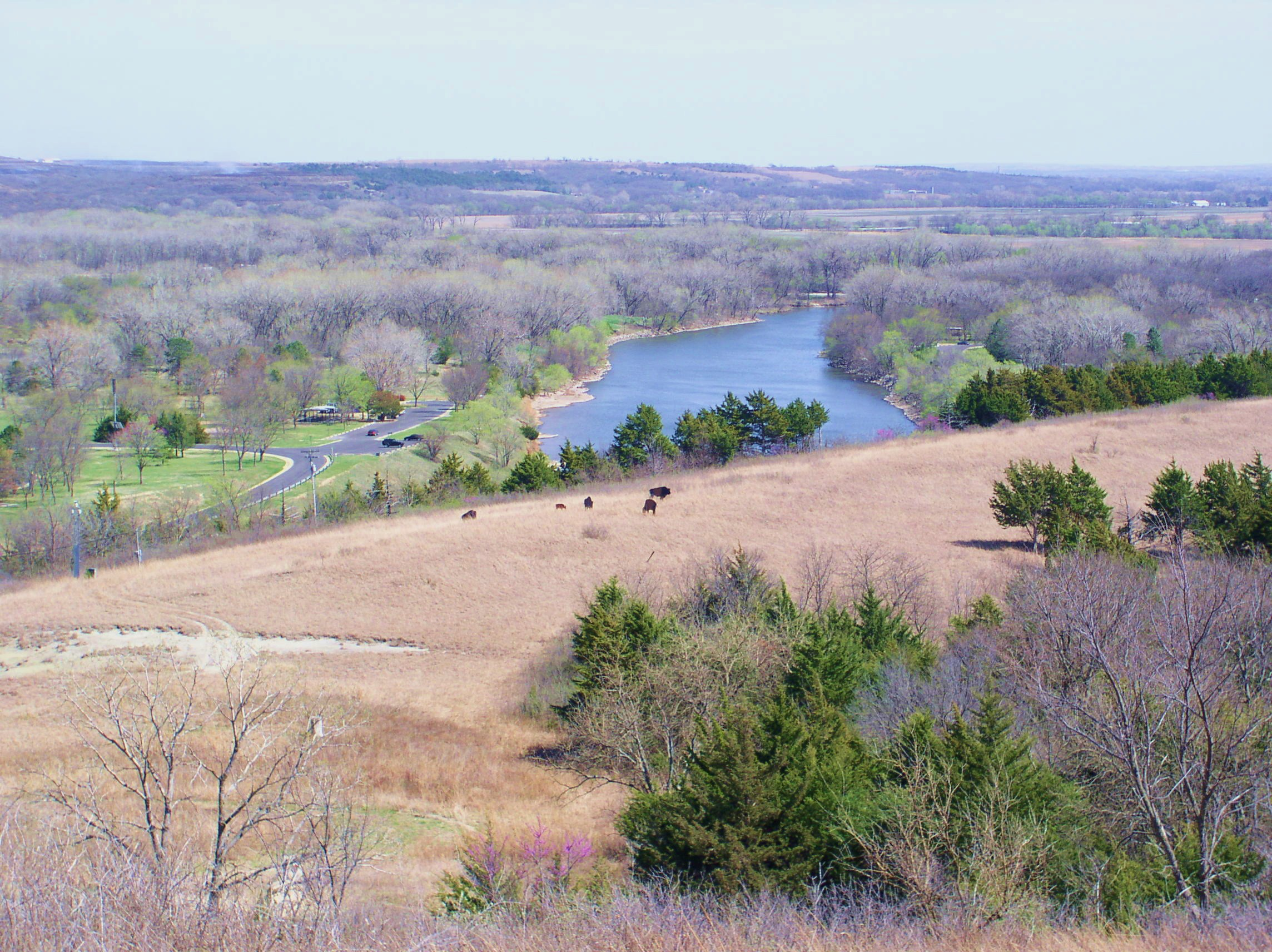
Big Blue River south of Tuttle Creek Lake, April 2011

The river passes through mostly agricultural land. Some of the larger towns along its course, in addition to Manhattan, Kansas, include Beatrice, Nebraska; Crete, Nebraska; and Seward, Nebraska.

Shortly before intersecting with the Kansas River, the Big Blue discharges its waters into a reservoir called Tuttle Creek Lake, which lies slightly northeast of Manhattan. The reservoir is a man-made flood-control measure, held back by a dam composed of the limestone, silt, and gypsum dredged out of the floodplain by bulldozers left to rust underneath the flooded area. The land surrounding the reservoir is a state park area, although the Great Flood of 1993 decimated much of the northern area.

The river continues as the outflow from Tuttle Creek Lake for approximately five miles before intersecting with the Kansas River east of Manhattan.

== Water rights ==
Nebraska and Kansas have entered into an agreement of appropriation where Nebraska has full use of the river's water, except that from May 1 to September 30 Nebraska must allow a certain variable flow to pass into Kansas. To date, there has been no shortage of water in the river.

== See also ==
- List of rivers of Kansas
- List of lakes, reservoirs, and dams in Kansas
- List of rivers of Nebraska
