= Tuttle Creek Lake =

Kansas reservoir on the Big Blue River

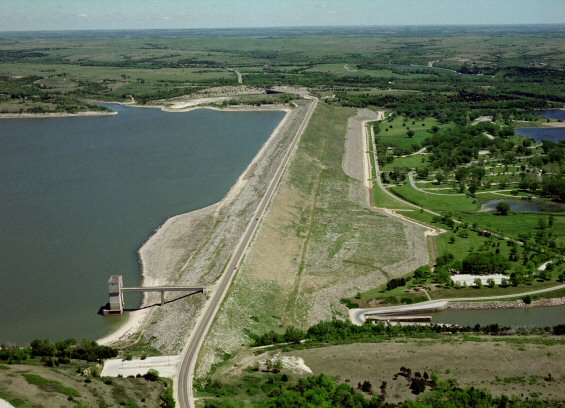
- Tuttle Creek Dam in 2005; Tuttle Creek Lake is on the left, while the River Pond Area of Tuttle Creek State Park is visible on the right.

- Location within Kansas Location within the United States

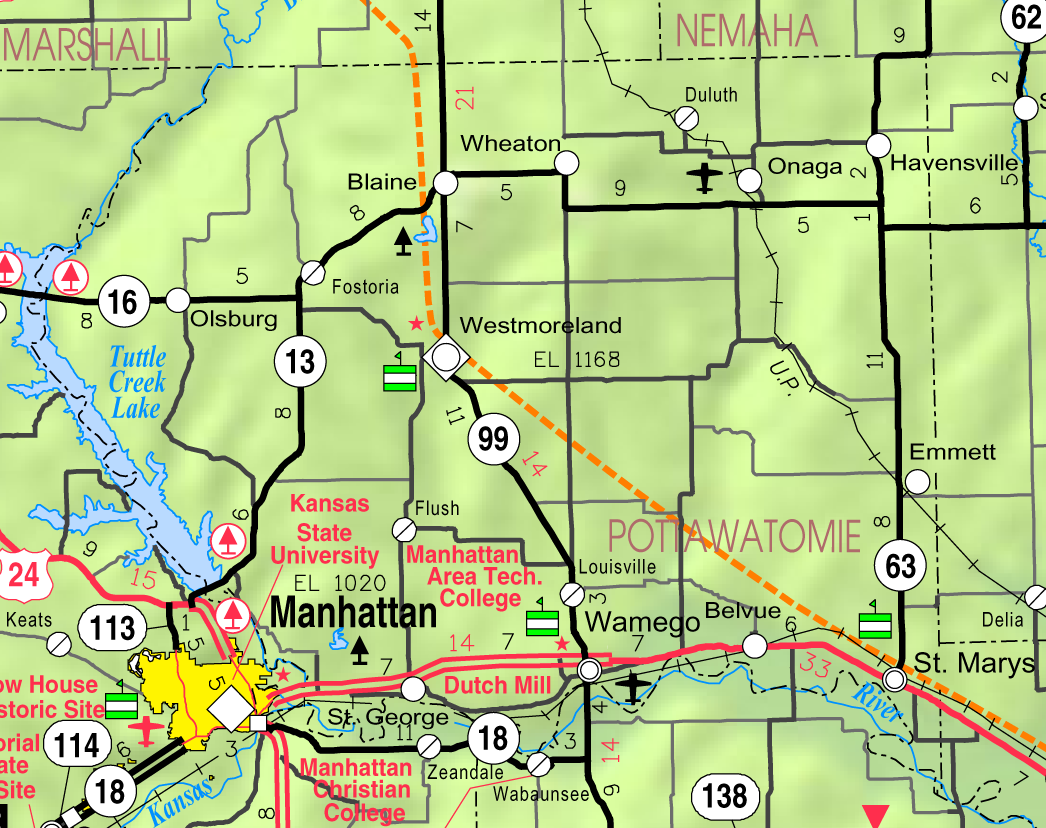
- KDOT map of Pottawatomie County (legend)
- Location: Pottawatomie / Riley / Marshall counties in Kansas
- Coordinates: 39°15′25″N 96°35′32″W
- Type: Reservoir
- Primary inflows: Big Blue River
- Primary outflows: Big Blue River to Kansas River
- Catchment area: 25,000 km^{2} (9,700 mi^{2})
- Basin countries: United States
- Managing agency: U.S. Army Corps of Engineers, Kansas Department of Wildlife & Parks (Tuttle Creek State Park)
- Max. length: 25 km (16 mi)
- Max. width: 2 km (1.2 mi)
- Surface area: 50 km^{2} (19 mi^{2})
- Max. depth: 15 m (49 ft)
- Water volume: 0.41 km^{3} (0.098 cu mi) (normal level)
- Shore length^{1}: 160 km (99 mi)
- Surface elevation: 328 m (1,076 ft)
- Settlements: Manhattan
- ^{1} Shore length is not a well-defined measure.

Tuttle Creek Lake is a reservoir on the Big Blue River 5 miles (8.0 km) north of Manhattan, in the Flint Hills region of northeast Kansas. It was built and is operated by the Army Corps of Engineers for the primary purpose of flood control. Secondary functions of the project include release of water stores to maintain barge traffic on the Mississippi River during seasons of drought, maintenance of a multi-use conservation pool for fish and wildlife enhancement and recreation (fishing, hunting, and boating), and release of sufficient water in droughts to maintain water quality for downstream communities.

The base of the dam is bordered by Tuttle Creek State Park, which features 1,200 acres (4.9 km^{2}) of recreational areas, including nature trails, camping sites, cabins, and an artificial beach. The state park also hosted the Country Stampede music festival every summer from 1996 to 2018, and the Rock The Plains music festival starting in 2025.

== Geography ==
Excluding the 8.5 miles (13.7 km) of narrow valley below the dam, the project manages the drainage of the entire watershed of the Big Blue River, an area of 9,628 square miles (24,940 km^{2}) that ranges from just north of Manhattan to the Platte River.

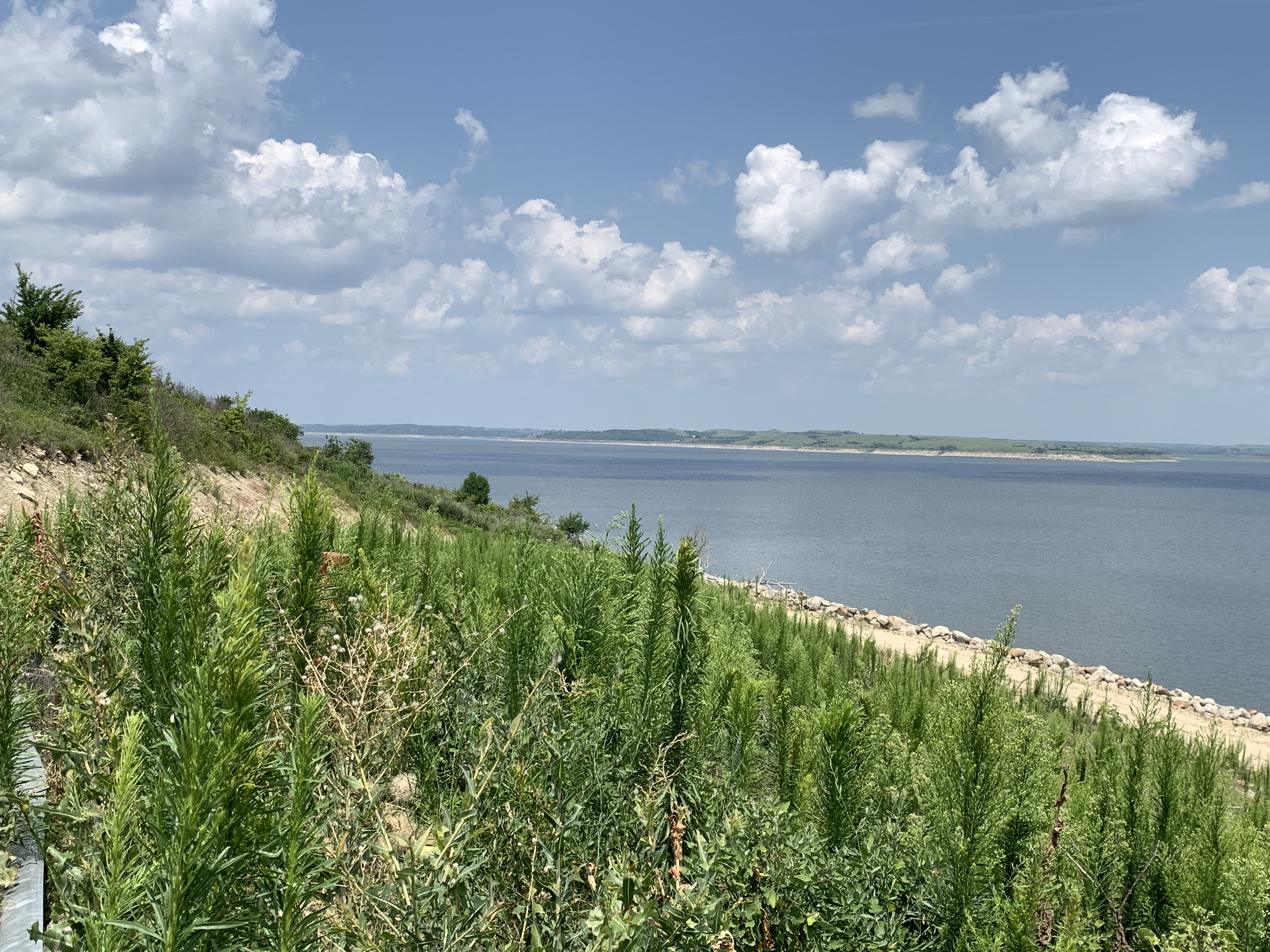
West shore of Tuttle Creek Lake, north of Manhattan, Kansas

The border between Riley County (on the west) and Pottawatomie County (on the east) is submerged underneath the lake. The dam is roughly two miles north of Manhattan, Kansas, and is crossed by Kansas Highway 13. Near the river delta at the lake's northern end, a bridge carrying Kansas Highway 16 spans the lake.

== History ==
From 1903 to 1959, 25 floods damaged the areas of the Kansas River at Topeka; but, over the same period, there were also times of critical drought. With the growth of population and industry, there was envisioned projects to both contain excessive floodwaters and conserve water for release in drought.

The Flood Control Act of 1938 authorized construction of Tuttle Creek Reservoir, and funds for initial planning were authorized in 1944. The construction of Tuttle Creek Dam as a Corps of Engineers project was given particular impetus by the Great Flood of 1951, which inundated downtown Manhattan, Topeka, and the West Bottoms of Kansas City. Total losses in the Kansas cities and farmland exceeded $725,000,000. Nevertheless, the project met with heavy opposition from landowners whose land faced flooding by the lake's construction. Residents of the Blue Valley organized opposition under the phrase "Let's quit this dam foolishness," and the campaign led to victory for Democrat Howard Shultz Miller in the U.S. House of Representatives in 1952. Although the opposition was heated, it failed to ultimately stop the dam.

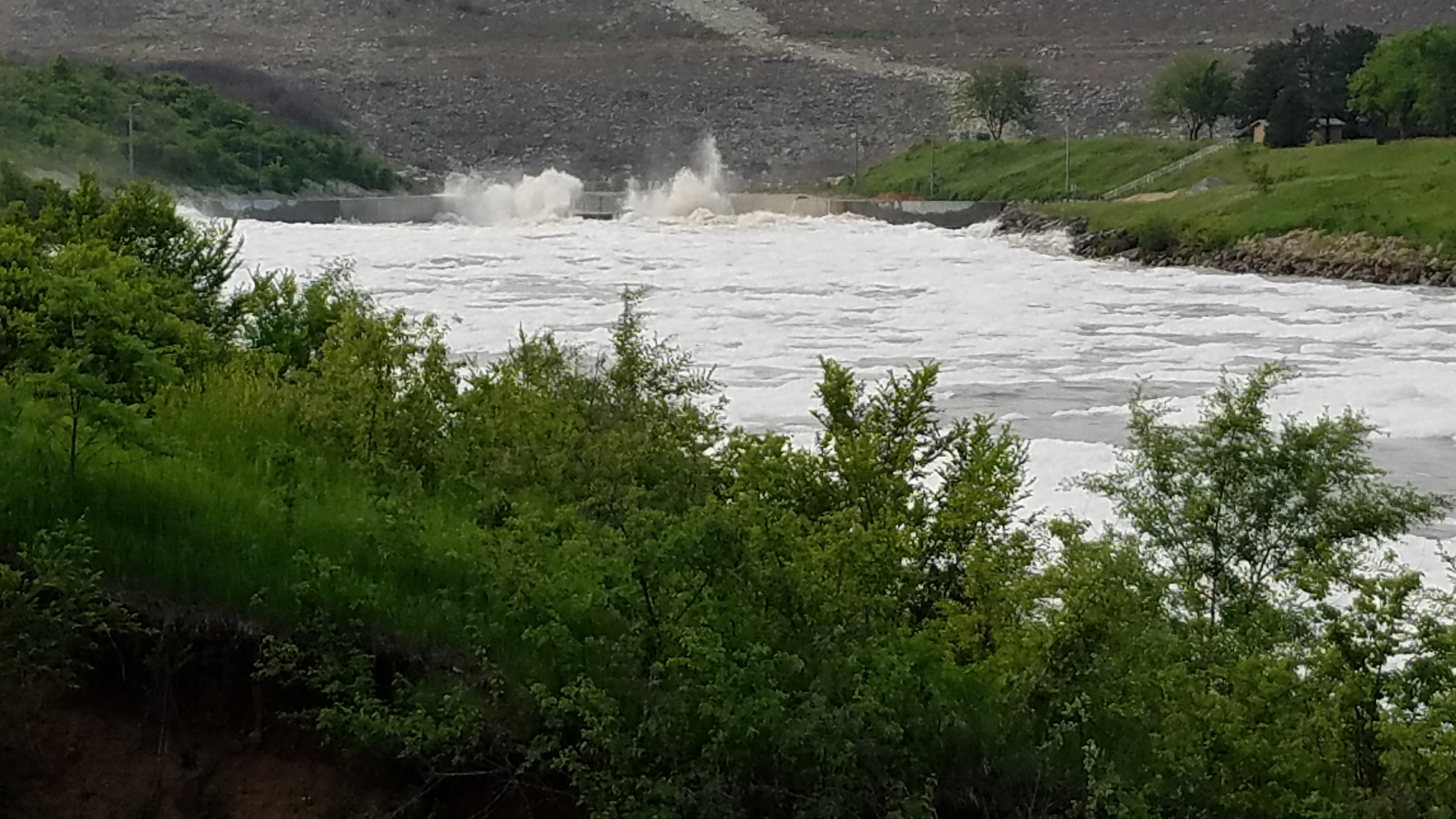
"The Tubes" releasing about 30,000 cubic feet per second (850 m^{3}/s), May 31, 2019.

Construction began in 1952. Closure of the dam (still under construction) occurred July 4, 1959 with diversion of the river though the completed intake tower ("The Tubes"). In 1960, the dam contained a record snow melt; even though not yet finished, the dam was credited at that time with preventing $15,243,000 in damages. During this event, the tubes discharged 29,000 cubic feet per second (820 m^{3}/s), a record amount for the intake tower that was not matched or exceeded until the tower's estimated 30,000 cubic feet per second (850 m^{3}/s) release on May 31, 2019.

When the dam was completed and the lake began filling up in 1962, it affected ten towns and entirely submerged four of them (from north to south): Cleburne at 39°31′49″N 96°38′6″W, Randolph, Garrison Cross and Stockdale. The only town to rebuild elsewhere was Randolph, where the streets are named after the submerged towns. The remnants of "Old Randolph", as it's known locally, can still be seen partially submerged to this day.

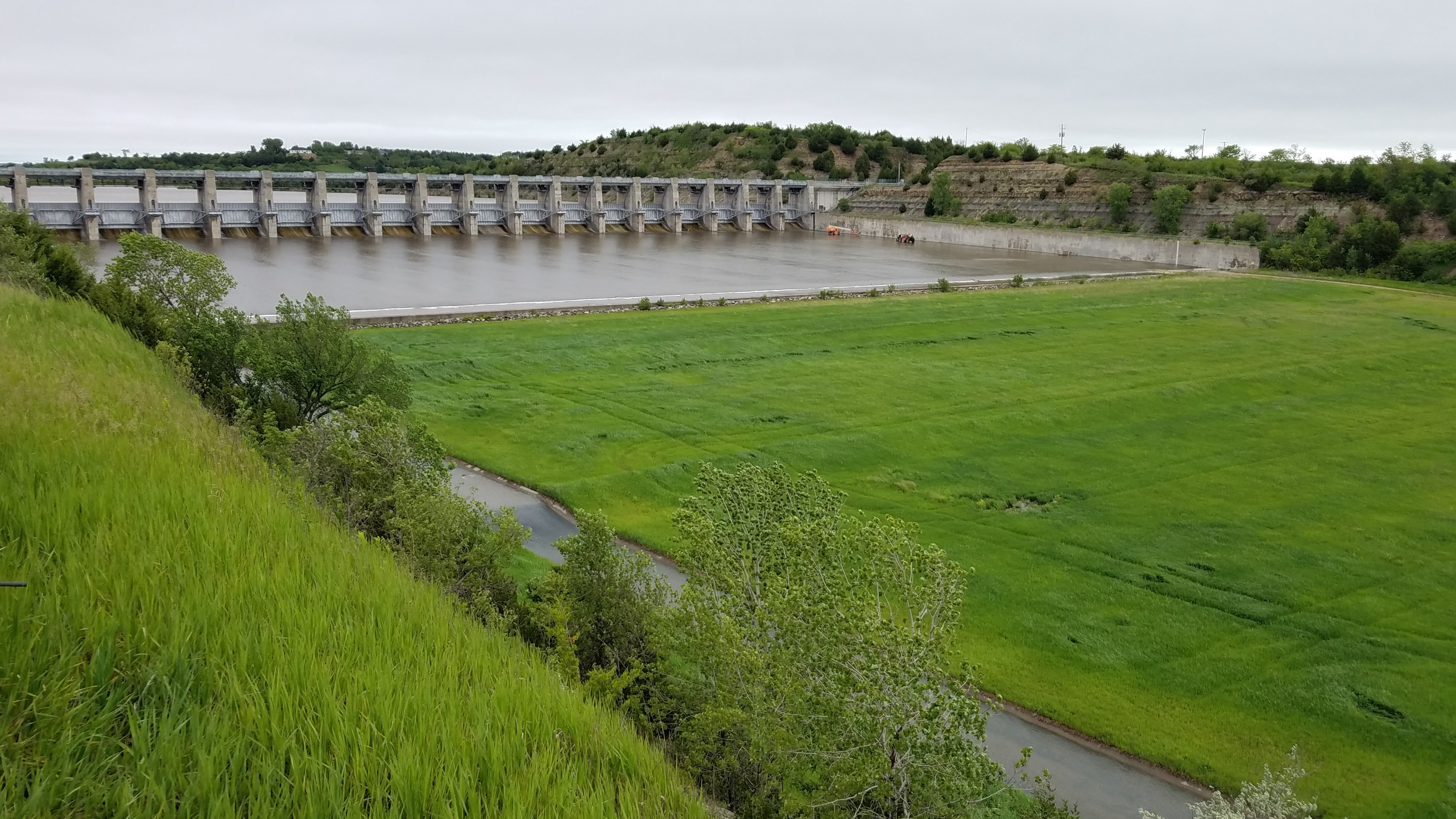
Spillway gates, May 2019.

The value of the dam was particularly proven during the Great Flood of 1993, when floodwaters reaching up to 63 feet (19 m) above normal were held back. However, when the dam reached capacity in July 1993, it necessitated the first release of the spillway since its installation. All 18 gates on the spillway were raised 4 feet (1.2 m) during the peak of the flood, producing a flow rate of 60,000 cubic feet per second (1,700 m^{3}/s) (with the tubes closed at that time). While this controlled flow rate resulted in flooding of low-lying homes and cropland, it was significantly less than the estimated peak flow of 96,000 cubic feet per second (2,700 m^{3}/s) the downstream communities would have experienced on June 30 had the dam not been in place, an amount that would have topped the Big Blue River Levee and flooded downtown Manhattan. The roar of the water was audible one-half mile (800 m) away and some people in nearby Manhattan reported hearing the noise.

=== 2019 flood ===
During 2019 there was a period consisting of a few days where there was heavy rain. The water levels rose and preparations were made in the event that the spillway was to be opened. The nearby RV park and other areas near the dam's main wall were evacuated, and those in the path of the spillway's flooding and destruction radius, if it were to be opened, were evacuated as well. The rain continued and more water than usual leaked out of the spillway's gates as a result, but the spillway was not opened. In the days following the event, there was some recovery from flash floods as a result of the rain.

== 1993 spillway chute erosion and repair ==
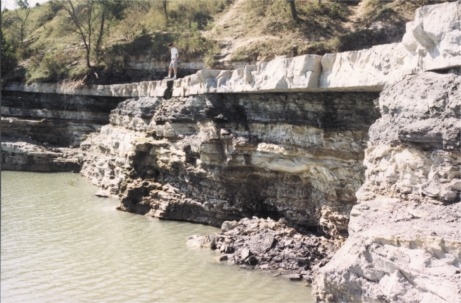
Johnson Shale head cut, deepest erosion in the spillway.

After three weeks of release in 1993, the spillway gates were closed, revealing over 32 acres (13 ha) of freshly exposed rock formations. This attraction became known locally as the Little Grand Canyon or "The Canyon".

=== Erosion ===
Below the gates lies 600 feet (180 m) of concrete-lined chute followed by about 7,000 feet (2,100 m) of unlined chute, originally maintained with grass cover. Erosion of the unlined chute during a spillway release was a factor of the design. As expected, the released water had rapidly scoured away all soil on the floor of the unlined chute and then quickly removed a few feet of loose, weathered rock, exposing solid, durable limestone shelves. Each of these limestone ledges experienced head cutting, where the underlying soft shale was eroded away; weakening, collapsing, and washing away some horizontal distance of the limestone at a rate much slower than the first removal of the looser material.

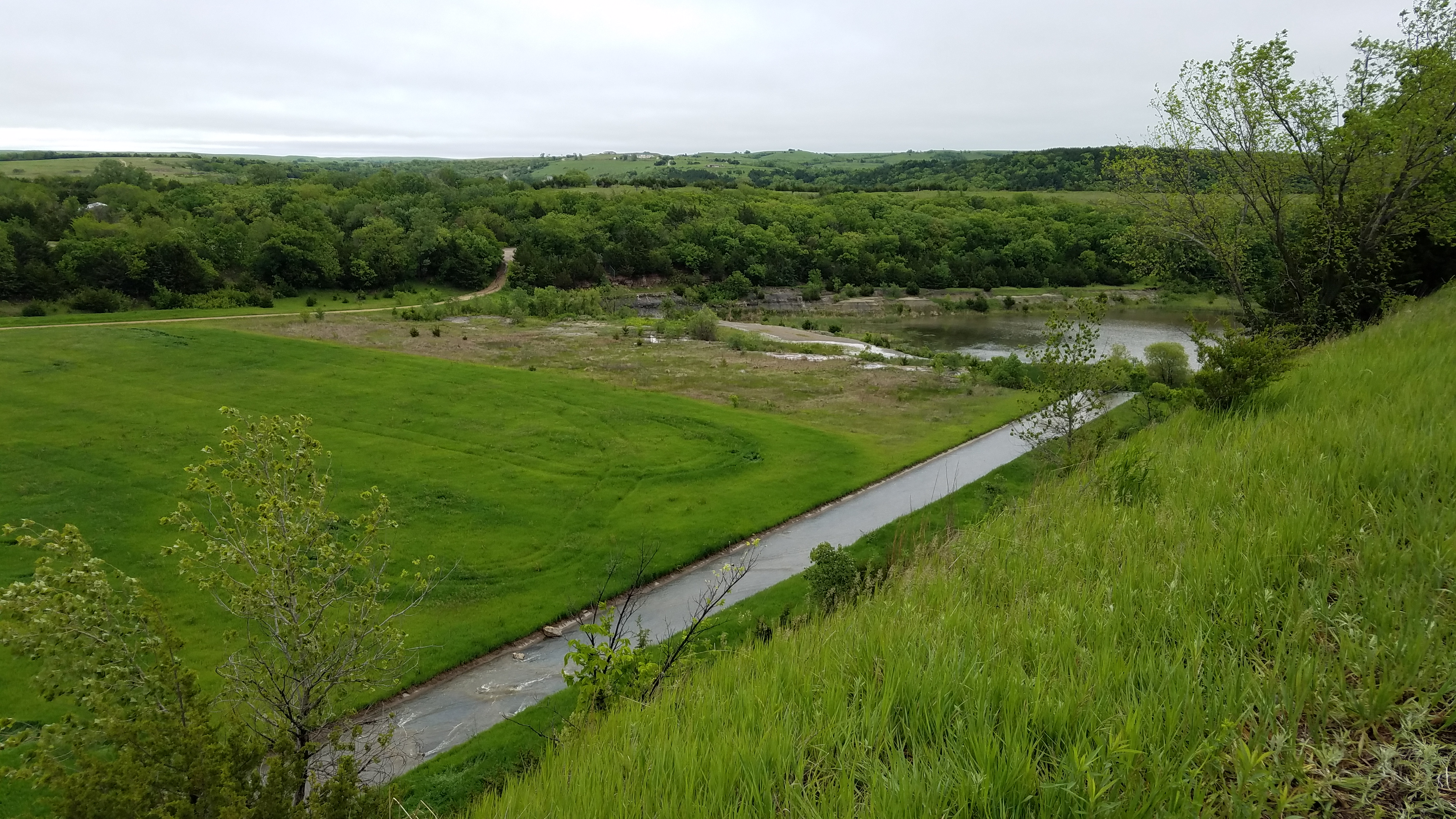
Rock left exposed below the Spillway Cycle Area, with beaver dam.

Each of these headcuts have a relatively resistant limestone bed on top and easily erodible rock (shale) underneath. Two particularly resistant limestone formations formed notable shelves: The limestone beds of the Red Eagle Formation topped a 26 feet (7.9 m) cliff (pictured), and from the base of that cliff stretched out 4.5 acres (1.8 ha) of the Long Creek limestone bed of the Foraker Formation (now covered by a beaver dam).

=== Geologic study ===
This area is of interest to geologists due to its superb exposure of the 300 million year old rocks of the upper-Carboniferous and lower-Permian underlying the Flint Hills. In this one location, five formations can be studied that are rarely exposed in great extent singly, let alone all together in an extended horizontal presentation.

These strata attest to a flat, arid paleoenvironment along the western margin of Pangaea with intermittent marine transgressions from the Panthalassa Ocean. Conditions there may have been analogous to the modern-day Persian Gulf coast of the Arabian Peninsula. As sea levels rose and fell over the course of many millennia, so too did the depositional environment change, resulting in repeating sequences of rock strata distinctive to the late paleozoic. In periods of high sea-level, limestone and shale were deposited, while periods of low sea-level resulted in the deposition of red and green clays and paleosols, giving the exposures at the spillway "canyon" a colorful "layer cake" appearance.

=== Spillway chute repair ===
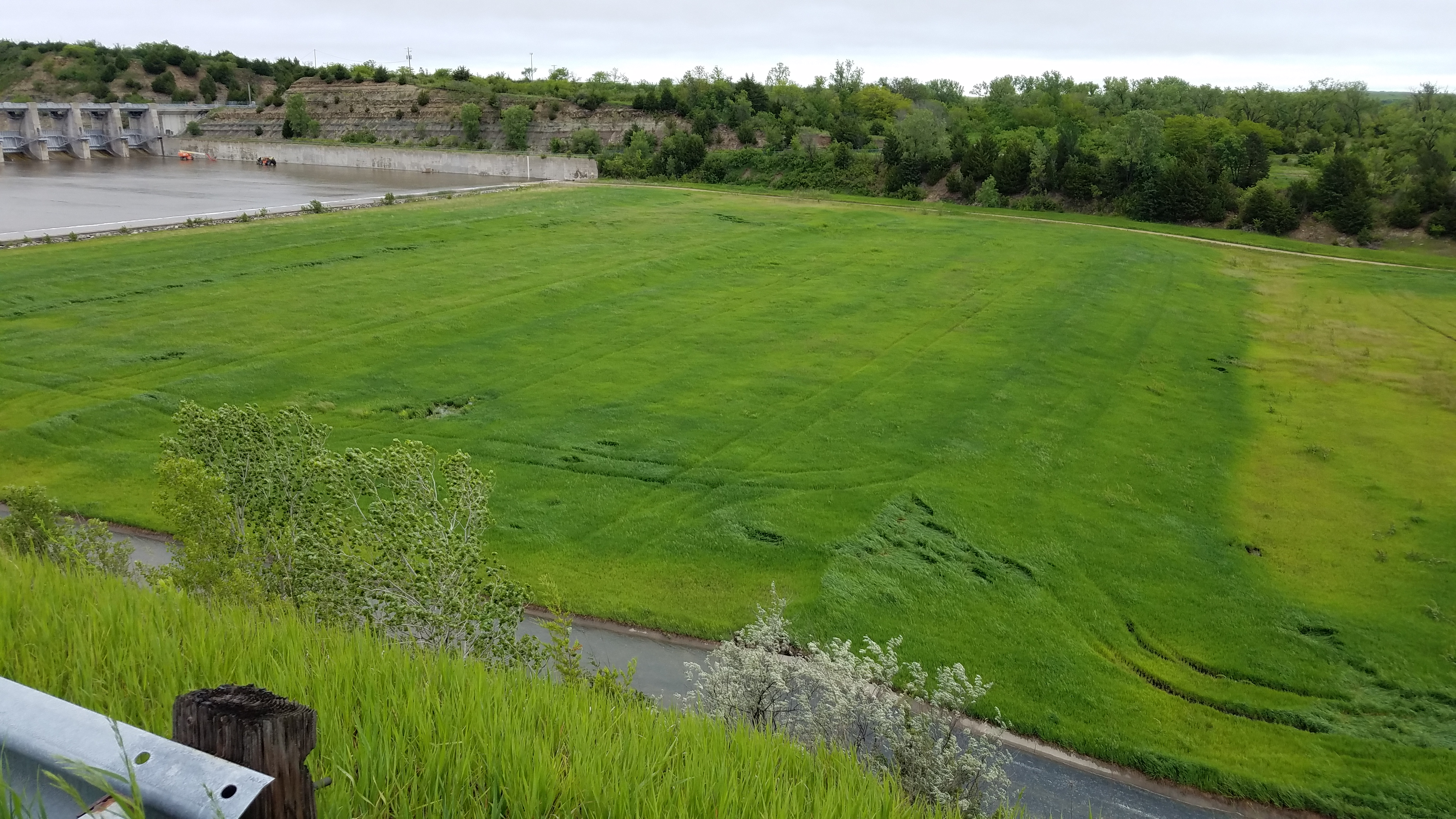
Resodded covering of the upper unlined chute in 2019.

Impressiveness of the 1993 geologic display aside, there was concern about the durability of the spillway in future releases. The structure and strength of the spillway's bedrock was studied to determine any necessary course of repair, reinforcement, or replacement. During the 1993 spillway release, daily photographs were taken of the rushing water at nine different locations to measure the speed of the expected head cutting. Analysis determined that the spillway could still survive 10 times the intensity of the 1993 release (the maximum 612,000 cubic feet per second (17,300 m^{3}/s) the spillway was designed to release).

However, the previously unexposed Roca Shale, which had demonstrated remarkable durability during the release, was expected to undergo rapid severe deterioration if left open to the effects of the Kansas climate. So, it was determined that minimal repair was to be made to the upper length of the chute. Weaker and fractured limestone shelves were grouted and then buttressed with shotcrete, and then the area was covered with terraced soil and returned to grass. Soil pH was adjusted to further protect the reburied rock. The rock formations of the lower portion were left exposed.

== Earthquake threat and mitigation ==
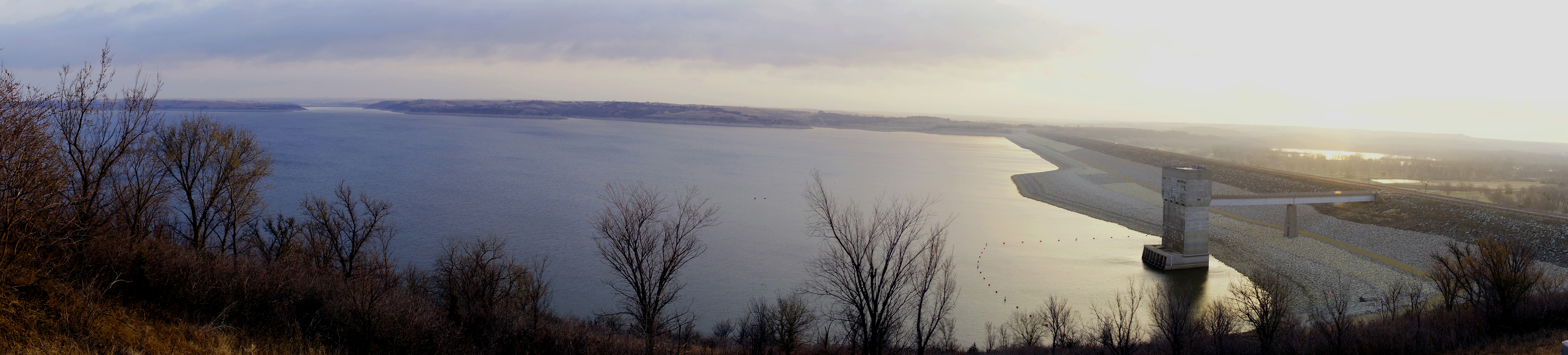
Tuttle Creek Lake near the dam.

Although Kansas is not widely known as seismically active, the Humboldt fault line associated with the Nemaha Ridge passes through eastern Kansas, and probably the most active region on the line is in the general vicinity of the lake. Studies that began in the 1980s showed that the geology of the area could potentially produce an earthquake capable of causing the dam to fail, which could risk the lives of thousands downstream in the Blue River and Kansas River valleys.

To address this threat, the Army Corps of Engineers completed a project in July 2010 that reinforced the dam with more than 350 concrete walls to stop channels in the underlying karst, and equipped it with warning sensors.

== See also ==
- List of Kansas state parks
- List of lakes, reservoirs, and dams in Kansas
- List of rivers of Kansas
