= K-13 (Kansas highway) =

State highway in Kansas, U.S.

K-13
- K-13 highlighted in red

Route information
- Maintained by KDOT
- Length: 14.617 mi (23.524 km)
- Existed: 1927–present

Major junctions
- South end: US-24 north of Manhattan near Tuttle Creek Lake
- North end: K-16 southwest of Fostoria

Location
- Country: United States
- State: Kansas
- Counties: Riley, Pottawatomie

Highway system
- Kansas State Highway System; Interstate; US; State; Spurs
← K-12	→ K-14

K-13 is a 14.62-mile-long (23.53 km) state highway in the northeastern part of the US state of Kansas. It begins at U.S. Route 24 (US-24) north of Manhattan and runs north to K-16 southwest of Fostoria. K-13 serves as the only northeasterly route out of Manhattan. The majority of the highway is exclusively in Pottawatomie County, with less than a mile of it existing in Riley County. The first two miles (3.2 km) traverse Tuttle Creek State Park, and crosses the Tuttle Creek Lake dam.

K-13 was first designated as a state highway in 1927, and at that time ran from US-77 in De Graff northward to Manhattan. By 1932, K-13 was realigned to intersect US-77 further south in El Dorado. By 1933, K-13 was extended north from Manhattan to K-9 north of Barrett. In 1958, K-13 was rerouted to cross the Tuttle Creek Dam and continue northward to K-16 southwest of Fostoria. Then in 1964, K-13's southern terminus was truncated to Manhattan, and the old section along with K-213 was redesignated as K-177. In 1991, K-13 was truncated to its current southern terminus.

== Route description ==
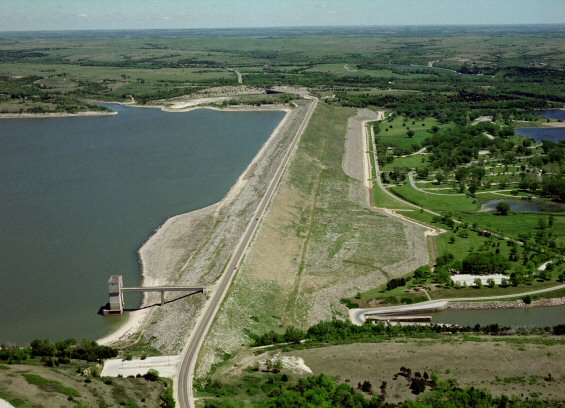
K-13 crosses the dam at Tuttle Creek Lake

K-13 begins at US-24 north of Manhattan and begins travelling northward. It then curves to the northeast and begins to cross the Tuttle Creek Dam. About halfway across the dam the route enters into Pottawatomie County. After crossing the dam, the highway begins to pass through small rolling hills with areas of scattered trees. The highway soon crosses Cedar Creek, then turns north and begins to parallel the creek. It continues north for two miles (3.2 km) then turns northeast at a junction with Carnahan Road (RS-1208), which goes north to Olsburg. At this point, the trees disappear and the highway begins to travel through rolling hills covered with grasslands. K-13 continues along the creek for another two miles (3.2 km) then turns north again, as it crosses Mud Creek. Just past the curve the landscape transitions to flat rural farmlands and continues northward for about 3.6 miles (5.8 km) where it intersects Bigelow Road. Just north of here the highway transitions back to small rolling hills and continues north for two miles (3.2 km) then intersects Westmoreland Road (RS-539), which goes east to Westmoreland. K-13 continues north for .5 miles (0.80 km) past here, and reaches its northern terminus at K-16 southwest of Fostoria and east of Olsburg.

The Kansas Department of Transportation (KDOT) tracks the traffic levels on its highways, and in 2018, they determined that on average the traffic varied from 1320 vehicles per day near the northern terminus to 2550 vehicles per day near the southern terminus. K-13 is not included in the National Highway System, a system of highways important to the nation's defense, economy, and mobility. K-13 does connect to the National Highway System at its southern terminus at US-24.

== History ==
K-13 was first designated as a state highway in 1927, by KDOT. At that time it began at US-77 in De Graff, and ran northeastward to Matfield Green, where it turned north. It then reached Cottonwood Falls where it began an overlap with K-57. The two routes continued north to Council Grove, where they began to overlap K-4 for a short distance. Then further north in Dwight, the overlap with K-57 ended and one with K-10 began. K-13 continued north to Alta Vista, where the overlap with K-4 ended. It then continued north and ended in Manhattan. Between 1931 and 1932, K-13 was realigned to go from Matfield Green southwest to US-77 in El Dorado, which bypassed De Graff. By 1933, K-13 was extended north from Manhattan along the west side of the Big Blue River. It then turned northeast, crossed the river, and entered Garrison. From here it went northeast before ending at K-9 north of Barrett. By 1936, K-113 was established from K-13 west of Bigelow north to Blue Rapids. Then on January 14, 1957, K-213 was established from where K-13 crossed the Big Blue River north to Randolph.

Then in a November 19, 1958 resolution, K-13 was rerouted to cross the Tuttle Creek Dam and continue northward to end at K-16 east of Olsburg. Also at this time, K-113 was decommissioned. In an April 8, 1964 resolution, K-13's southern terminus was truncated to Manhattan. At this time the section of K-13 from El Dorado to K-213, along with K-213 was redesignated as K-177. In a January 1, 1991 resolution, K-13 was truncated to US-24 north of Manhattan. Also, K-177, which overlapped K-13 from Manhattan was truncated to the southeast side of Manhattan.

== Major junctions ==
County	Location	mi	km	Destinations	Notes
Riley		0.000	0.000	US-24 (Tuttle Creek Boulevard) – Manhattan, Clay Center, Kansas State University	Southern terminus; road continues as Dam Road
Tuttle Creek Lake		0.4– 1.8	0.64– 2.9	Tuttle Creek Dam	
Pottawatomie		14.617	23.524	K-16 – Blaine, Olsburg, Randolph	Northern terminus; road continues as K-16 east
1.000 mi = 1.609 km; 1.000 km = 0.621 mi

== See also ==
- List of state highways in Kansas
