= Louisville, Kansas =

City in Pottawatomie County, Kansas

- City
- Location within Pottawatomie County and Kansas

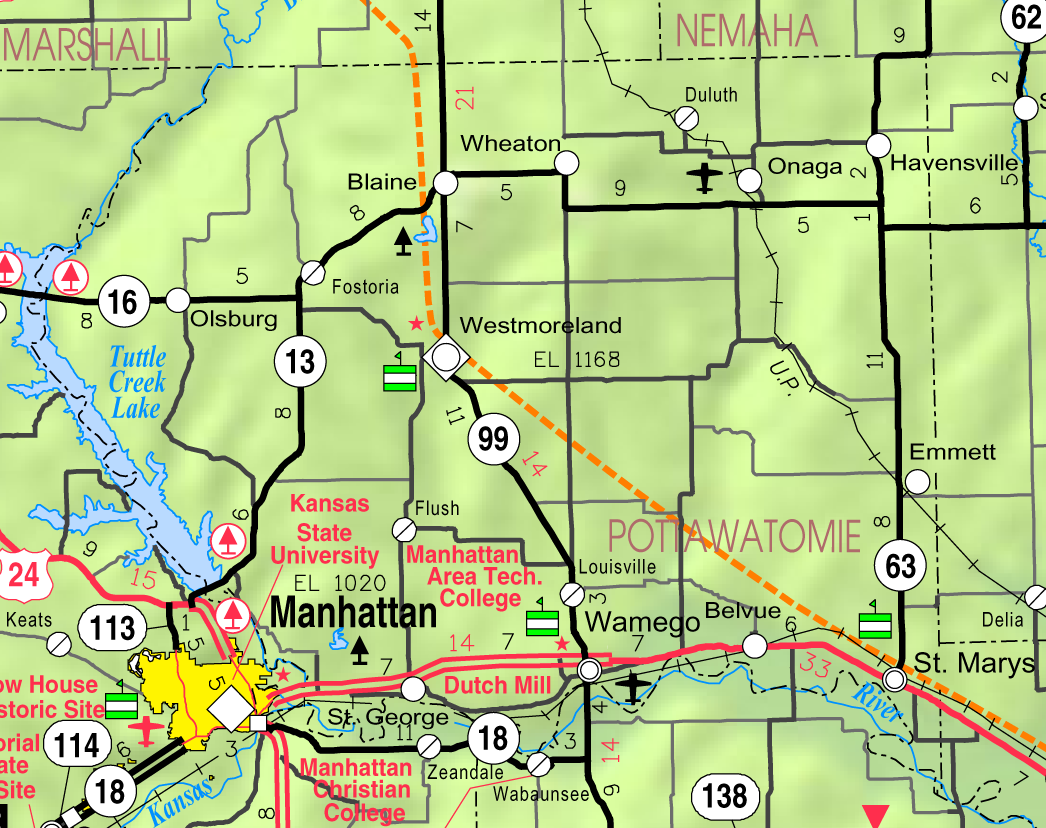
- KDOT map of Pottawatomie County (legend)
- Coordinates: 39°15′00″N 96°18′52″W
- Country: United States
- State: Kansas
- County: Pottawatomie
- Founded: 1857
- Incorporated: 1870
- Named for: Louis Wilson and Louis Vieux

Area
  - Total: 0.50 sq mi (1.29 km^{2})
  - Land: 0.50 sq mi (1.29 km^{2})
  - Water: 0 sq mi (0.00 km^{2})
- Elevation: 1,011 ft (308 m)

Population (2020)
  - Total: 131
  - Density: 263/sq mi (102/km^{2})
- Time zone: UTC-6 (CST)
  - Summer (DST): UTC-5 (CDT)
- ZIP Code: 66450
- Area code: 785
- FIPS code: 20-42925
- GNIS ID: 2395771

Louisville is a city in Pottawatomie County, Kansas, United States. As of the 2020 census, the population of the city was 131.

== History ==
The community was founded in 1857 by Robert Wilson as Rock Post. The area was once part of the Potawatomi Hunting grounds and a large majority of the settlers were either associated with the Pottawatomie Indian Reservation or commerce on the Oregon Trail. Louisville was named for Robert Wilson's son, Louis, and for Louis Vieux, a successful businessman in the area. The town was a contender for county seat of Pottawatomie County but lost to St. George in 1861 and Westmoreland in 1882.

On November 8, 1875, Louisville was struck by an earthquake. In 1882, with the county seat in Westmoreland and the Union Pacific Railroad built through Wamego, the town's population swiftly declined.

=== Louis Vieux ===
Louis Vieux Sr. was a prominent citizen of Louisville who operated a trail crossing across the Vermillion River. He was born in 1809 in Wisconsin to Angelique Roy, a Potawatomi woman, and Jacques Vieux, a Canadian-French trader. Vieux and his wife, Sha-Note, moved first to Cedar Bluffs, Iowa in 1832 until moving to Indianola, Kansas (northwest of Topeka along Soldier Creek) in 1846. Sha-Note died in 1857 and Vieux moved to the Vermillion River near present-day Louisville. Vieux began his trail crossing business and worked as a caller for the U.S. Government working the pay station in St. Mary's and he also served on the tribal council and made trips to Washington, D.C., on behalf of the Pottawatomies. Vieux also signed the treaty that split the Pottawatomies into two separate tribes-the Prairie Band and Citizen Potawatomi Nation. Vieux died in 1872 and left behind a 200-page will leaving half the town of Louisville, all of Belvue and other personal property to his wife and children.

=== Oregon Trail crossing ===
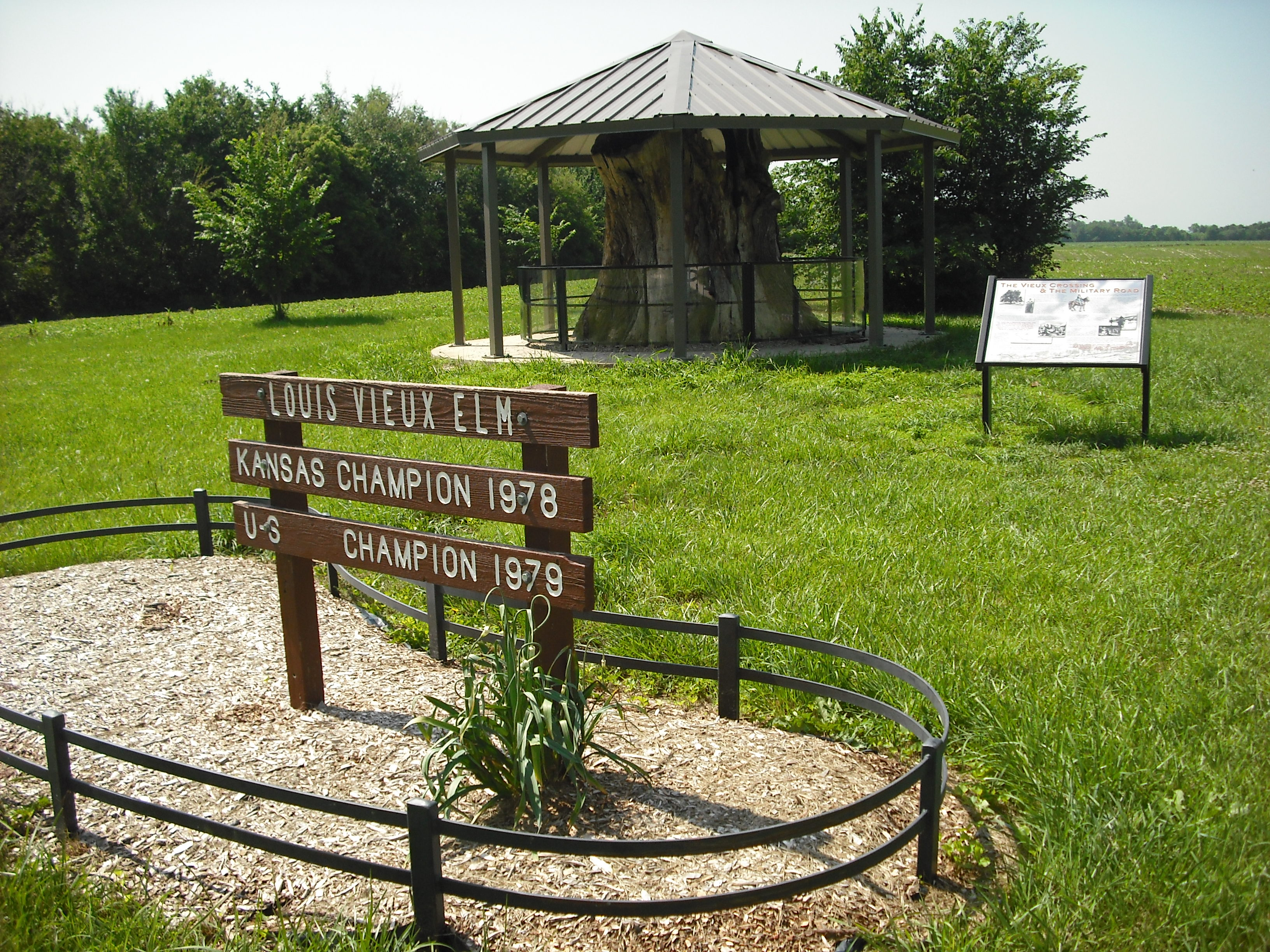
The Louis Vieux Elm Tree park, in 2009, located three miles east of Louisville.

About three miles east of Louisville was the Vermillion Crossing of the Oregon Trail operated by Louis Vieux. Vieux is buried in the Vieux Family Cemetery on top of a hill. Nearby, on the banks of the river, is a cholera cemetery from 1849, which is estimated to contain at least fifty graves, although only two stones—both native sandstones—remain. The Louis Vieux Elm Tree is across the river and is estimated to be over 300 years old. The tree had been afflicted with Dutch elm disease, a lightning strike and vandalism and efforts were taken to protect and shelter the tree's stump. In August 2011, the stump was destroyed by fire. Near the tree are the graves of seven unknown soldiers.

== Geography ==
Louisville is located between Wamego and Westmoreland on K-99.

According to the United States Census Bureau, the city has a total area of 0.49 square miles (1.27 km^{2}), all land.

== Demographics ==
Historical population
Census	Pop.	Note	%±
1860	135		—
1870	344		154.8%
1880	432		25.6%
1890	382		−11.6%
1900	336		−12.0%
1910	246		−26.8%
1920	207		−15.9%
1930	227		9.7%
1940	188		−17.2%
1950	190		1.1%
1960	204		7.4%
1970	204		0.0%
1980	207		1.5%
1990	215		3.9%
2000	209		−2.8%
2010	188		−10.0%
2020	131		−30.3%
U.S. Decennial Census

Louisville is part of the Manhattan, Kansas Metropolitan Statistical Area.

=== 2020 census ===
The 2020 United States census counted 131 people, 57 households, and 25 families in Louisville. The population density was 262.5 per square mile (101.4/km^{2}). There were 78 housing units at an average density of 156.3 per square mile (60.4/km^{2}). The racial makeup was 96.95% (127) white or European American (96.95% non-Hispanic white), 0.0% (0) black or African-American, 0.0% (0) Native American or Alaska Native, 0.0% (0) Asian, 0.0% (0) Pacific Islander or Native Hawaiian, 0.0% (0) from other races, and 3.05% (4) from two or more races. Hispanic or Latino of any race was 0.76% (1) of the population.

Of the 57 households, 14.0% had children under the age of 18; 33.3% were married couples living together; 22.8% had a female householder with no spouse or partner present. 38.6% of households consisted of individuals and 14.0% had someone living alone who was 65 years of age or older. The average household size was 1.8 and the average family size was 2.2. The percent of those with a bachelor's degree or higher was estimated to be 10.7% of the population.

13.7% of the population was under the age of 18, 6.1% from 18 to 24, 27.5% from 25 to 44, 33.6% from 45 to 64, and 19.1% who were 65 years of age or older. The median age was 46.8 years. For every 100 females, there were 92.6 males. For every 100 females ages 18 and older, there were 82.3 males.

The 2016–2020 5-year American Community Survey estimates show that the median household income was $47,500 (with a margin of error of +/- $21,465) and the median family income was $55,909 (+/- $7,179). Males had a median income of $21,534 (+/- $3,471) versus $34,375 (+/- $13,252) for females. The median income for those above 16 years old was $21,932 (+/- $7,089). Approximately, 2.0% of families and 6.4% of the population were below the poverty line, including 28.6% of those under the age of 18 and 0.0% of those ages 65 or over.

=== 2010 census ===
As of the census of 2010, there were 188 people, 78 households, and 39 families residing in the city. The population density was 383.7 inhabitants per square mile (148.1/km^{2}). There were 96 housing units at an average density of 195.9 per square mile (75.6/km^{2}). The racial makeup of the city was 92.0% White, 1.1% Native American, 4.3% from other races, and 2.7% from two or more races. Hispanic or Latino of any race were 5.9% of the population.

There were 78 households, of which 29.5% had children under the age of 18 living with them, 38.5% were married couples living together, 10.3% had a female householder with no husband present, 1.3% had a male householder with no wife present, and 50.0% were non-families. 26.9% of all households were made up of individuals, and 10.2% had someone living alone who was 65 years of age or older. The average household size was 2.41 and the average family size was 3.18.

The median age in the city was 34.5 years. 22.9% of residents were under the age of 18; 11.7% were between the ages of 18 and 24; 28.7% were from 25 to 44; 26.1% were from 45 to 64; and 10.6% were 65 years of age or older. The gender makeup of the city was 51.1% male and 48.9% female.

=== 2000 census ===
As of the census of 2000, there were 209 people, 77 households, and 56 families residing in the city. The population density was 427.3 inhabitants per square mile (165.0/km^{2}). There were 84 housing units at an average density of 171.7 per square mile (66.3/km^{2}). The racial makeup of the city was 98.56% White, 0.48% from other races, and 0.96% from two or more races. Hispanic or Latino of any race were 1.44% of the population.

There were 77 households, out of which 37.7% had children under the age of 18 living with them, 54.5% were married couples living together, 18.2% had a female householder with no husband present, and 26.0% were non-families. 19.5% of all households were made up of individuals, and 7.8% had someone living alone who was 65 years of age or older. The average household size was 2.71 and the average family size was 3.09.

In the city, the population was spread out, with 29.2% under the age of 18, 8.1% from 18 to 24, 30.1% from 25 to 44, 20.1% from 45 to 64, and 12.4% who were 65 years of age or older. The median age was 35 years. For every 100 females, there were 95.3 males. For every 100 females age 18 and over, there were 97.3 males.

The median income for a household in the city was $35,568, and the median income for a family was $37,045. Males had a median income of $26,250 versus $18,472 for females. The per capita income for the city was $15,741. About 8.9% of families and 12.2% of the population were below the poverty line, including 24.5% of those under the age of eighteen and none of those 65 or over.

== Education ==
The community is served by Wamego USD 320 public school district.
