= Wiley Taylor =

American baseball player (1888–1954)

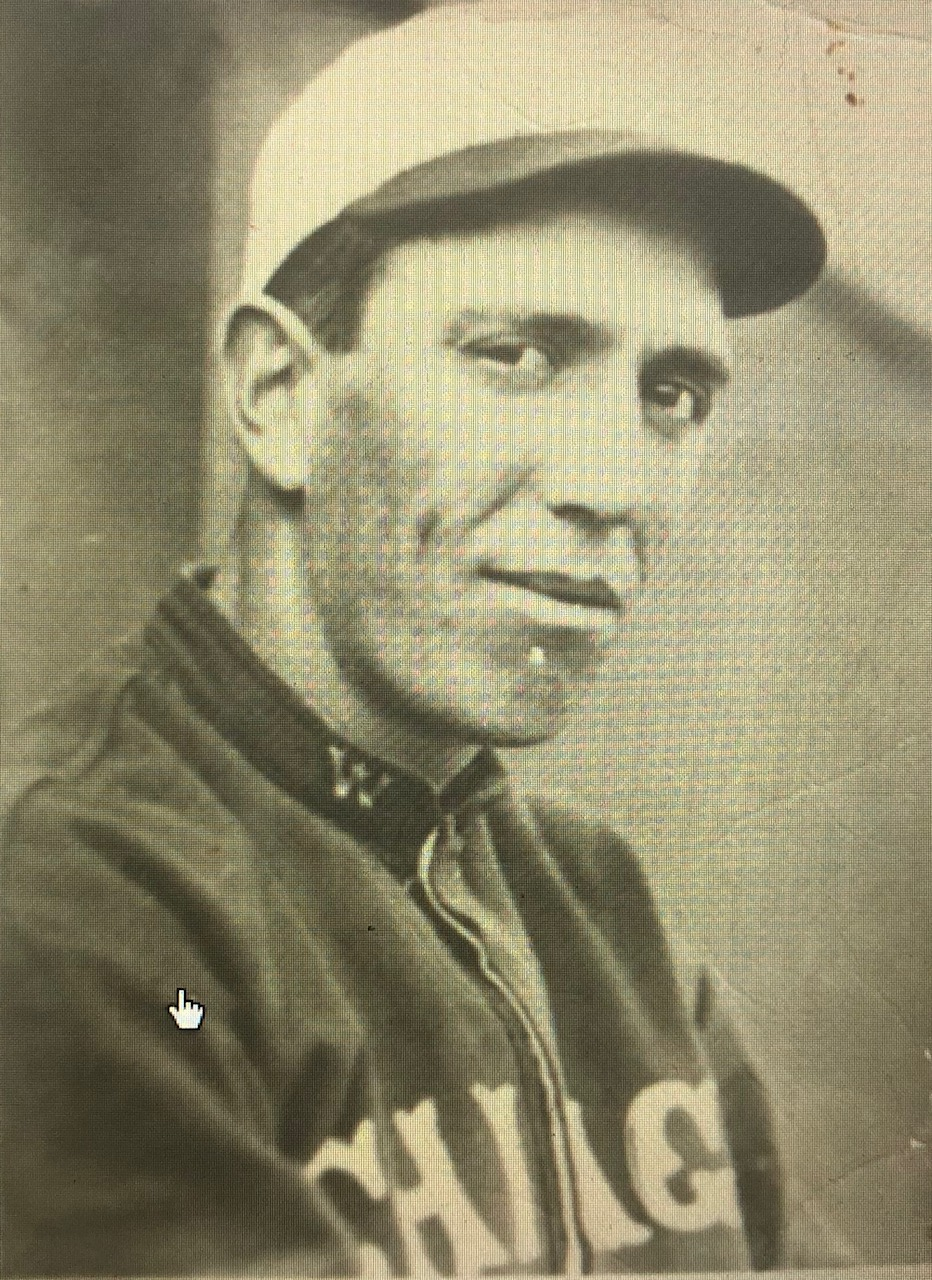
- Pitcher
- Born: March 18, 1888; Wamego, Kansas, U.S.
- Died: July 8, 1954 (aged 66); Westmoreland, Kansas, U.S.
- Batted: Right Threw: Right

MLB debut
- September 6, 1911, for the Detroit Tigers

Last MLB appearance
- August 5, 1914, for the St. Louis Browns

MLB statistics
- Win–loss record: 2-10
- Earned run average: 4.10
- Strikeouts: 45
- Stats at Baseball Reference

Teams
- Detroit Tigers (1911); Chicago White Sox (1912); St. Louis Browns (1913–1914)

Philip Wiley Taylor (March 18, 1888 – July 8, 1954) was an American baseball pitcher and law enforcement officer. He played professional baseball from 1911 to 1917 and in 1923, including four seasons in Major League Baseball for the Detroit Tigers (1911), Chicago White Sox (1912), and St. Louis Browns (1913–1914). He appeared in 27 games (17 as a starter) and compiled a 2–10 with an earned run average (ERA) of 4.10 over 120-2/3 innings. He served as the sheriff of Pottawatomie County, Kansas

== Early years ==
Taylor was born in 1888 in Wamego, Kansas.

== Professional baseball player ==
Taylor began playing professional baseball for the Ellsworth team in the Central Kansas League. He advanced to the Austin Senators of the Texas League in 1911, appearing in 37 games and compiling a 22–14 record with 311 innings pitched. He helped lead Austin to the 1911 Texas League pennant. The Houston Post picked him for its All-Texas team and noted: "Taylor of Austin is credited by the league batsmen as being the best of them all with the actual possession of the stuff on the ball. He was seldom bumped hard and was almost always a remarkably effective pitcher. Taylor has a varied assortment of curves and excellent control."

After an impressive season in Austin, Taylor was purchased by the Detroit Tigers. He made his major league debut on September 6, 1911. He appeared in three games for Detroit, two as a starter, and compiled a 0–2 record with a 3.79 ERA in 19 innings pitched.

Taylor was returned by Detroit to Austin in the spring of 1912. He appeared in 35 games for Austin, compiling an 11–16 record. In August 1912, he was purchased from Austin by the Chicago White Sox. He appeared in three games for Chicago, all as a starter, and compiled a 0–1 record with a 4.95 ERA in 20 innings pitched.

Taylor again returned to Austin at the start of the 1913 season. He appeared in 40 games for Austin and compiled an 18–17 record in a career-high 356 innings pitched. After another season as Austin's premier pitcher, he was released to the St. Louis Browns at the end of August in exchange for a payment of $1,500. Taylor appeared in five games for the Browns in the final month of the season, four of them as a starter. He compiled a 0–2 record with a 4.83 ERA in 31-2/3 innings pitched.

Taylor returned to the Browns in 1914 for his longest stint in the majors. He appeared in 16 games for the 1914 Browns, eight as a starter, and compiled a 2–5 record with a 3.42 ERA. He appeared in his final major league game on August 5, 1914.

Taylor continued to pitch in the minor leagues for several years, including stints with the Louisville Colonels (1913–1915), Nashville Volunteers (1916–1917), Salina Millers (1923), and Topeka Kaws (1923).

== Later years ==
After his baseball career ended, Taylor lived in Pottawatomie County, Kansas. He worked as a farmer and served as sheriff of Pottawotamie County in 1926 and 1927. In his later years, he operated a service station and recreation parlor in Westmoreland, Kansas. He died in 1954 at Westmoreland. He was buried at Louisville Cemetery in Louisville, Kansas.
