= Fostoria, Kansas =

Unincorporated community in Pottawatomie County, Kansas

- Unincorporated community
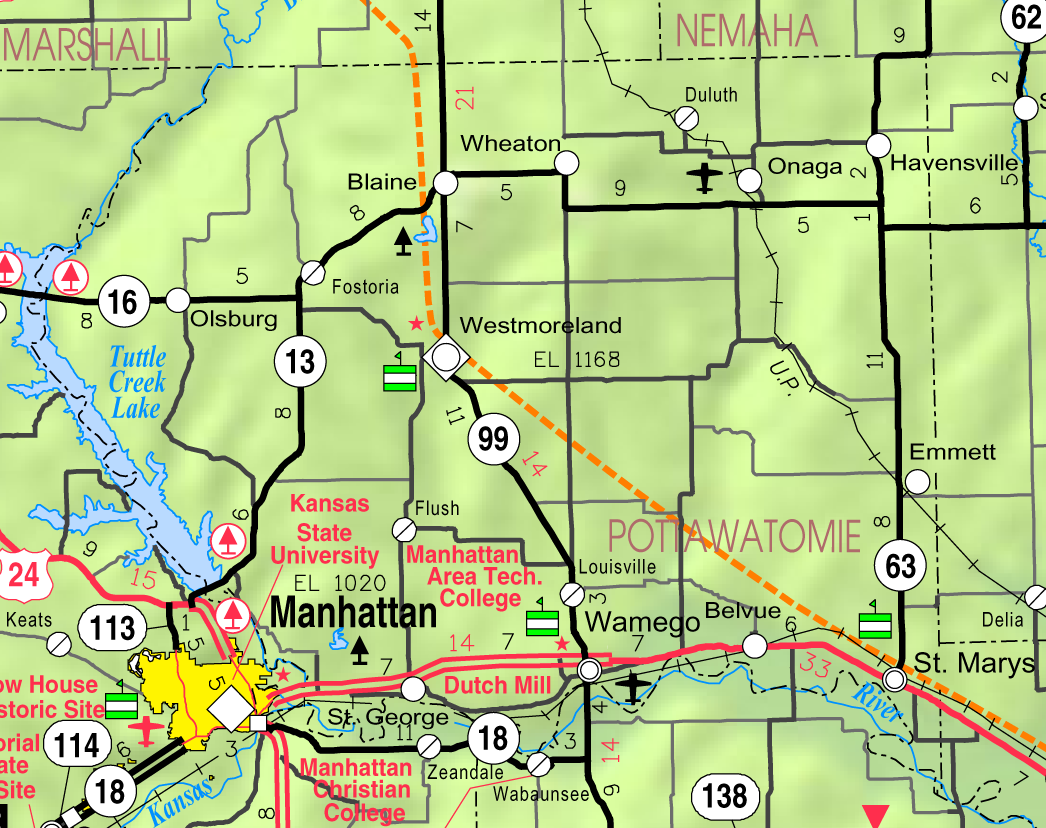
- KDOT map of Pottawatomie County (legend)

- Location within Kansas Location within the United States
- Coordinates: 39°26′23″N 96°30′28″W
- Country: United States
- State: Kansas
- County: Pottawatomie
- Elevation: 1,473 ft (449 m)
- Time zone: UTC-6 (CST)
  - Summer (DST): UTC-5 (CDT)
- ZIP Code: 66426
- Area code: 785
- FIPS code: 20-24050
- GNIS ID: 476080

Fostoria is an unincorporated community in Pottawatomie County, Kansas, United States. Fostoria is 6 miles (9.7 km) east of Olsburg. Fostoria has no post office and is in ZIP Code 66549.

== History ==
The first post office in Fostoria was established in 1884.

== Climate ==
The climate in this area is characterized by hot, humid summers and generally mild to cool winters. According to the Köppen Climate Classification system, Fostoria has a humid subtropical climate, abbreviated "Cfa" on climate maps.

== Education ==
The community is served by Blue Valley USD 384 public school district.
