= Samuel J. Reader =

American diarist (1836–1914)

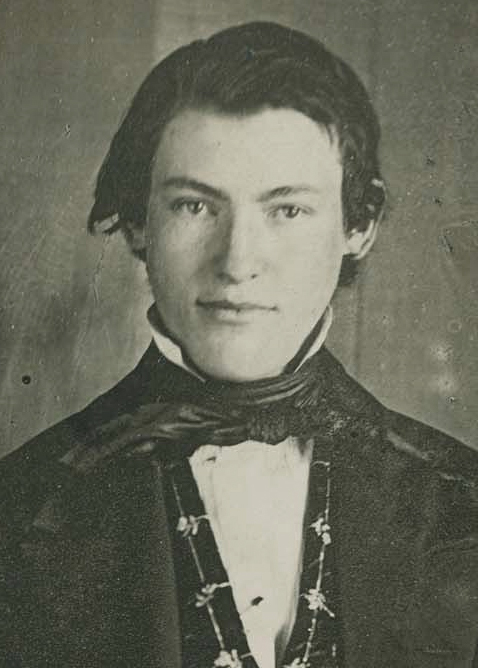
- Reader in 1855
- Born: Samuel James Reader; January 25, 1836; Greenfield (present-day Coal Center), Pennsylvania, U.S.
- Died: September 15, 1914 (aged 78); Topeka, Kansas, U.S.
- Resting place: Rochester Cemetery, Topeka, Kansas, U.S. 39°06′16.0″N 95°40′48.9″W
- Occupations: Farmer; writer; artist; amateur photographer
- Spouse: Elizabeth Smith (m. 1867)
- Children: 3
- Writing career
- Years active: 1849–1914
- Military career
- Branch: Kansas State Militia
- Service years: 1863–1864
- Rank: Second Lieutenant
- Unit: 2nd Kansas Militia Infantry Regiment
- Conflicts: American Civil War: Battle of the Blue (POW)

Samuel J. Reader (1836–1914) was an American diarist and artist who wrote about his experiences during Bleeding Kansas and the American Civil War.

== Early life ==
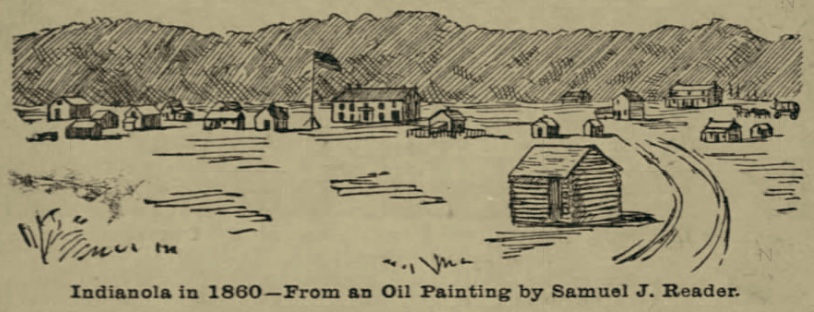
Indianola in 1860 – From an Oil Painting by Samuel J. Reader, 1901

Samuel James Reader was born on January 25, 1836, in Greenfield (present-day Coal Center), Pennsylvania, where his father settled in 1847 upon his second marriage, the son of carpenter and millwright Francis Reader and Catherine (née James) Reader. His mother died May 19, 1836, and he was raised by his maternal grandparents and an aunt, Eliza James. He lived in La Harpe, Illinois, from the age of five to 18. (Note: While Samuel moved to La Harpe, Illinois with his aunt and sister, his father remained in Pennsylvania and married a second time in 1842 to Eleanor Bentley Smith. After having three children, his wife died of typhoid fever in 1847. Although it is said that Samuel lived in La Harpe, Illinois until he was 18, Jordan states that he was reunited with his father upon his third marriage in 1849 to Mrs. William Duvall Jackson, who died in 1854.) He had a sister, Eliza Matilda, who later became the wife of Dr. M. A. Campdoras.

== Career ==
He began recording events of his life in journals in 1847 after being inspired by the documentation of the Lewis and Clark Expedition. In 1855, he traveled in a wagon from Illinois and settled on a farm near Indianola, Shawnee County, Kansas, with his sister and his aunt. An early settler of Shawnee County who remained a resident of the state until his death, his continuing journals captured the history of the territory and early years of the state. He illustrated his writings with primitive watercolor and oil paintings and pen and ink illustrations. They were written in English and French.

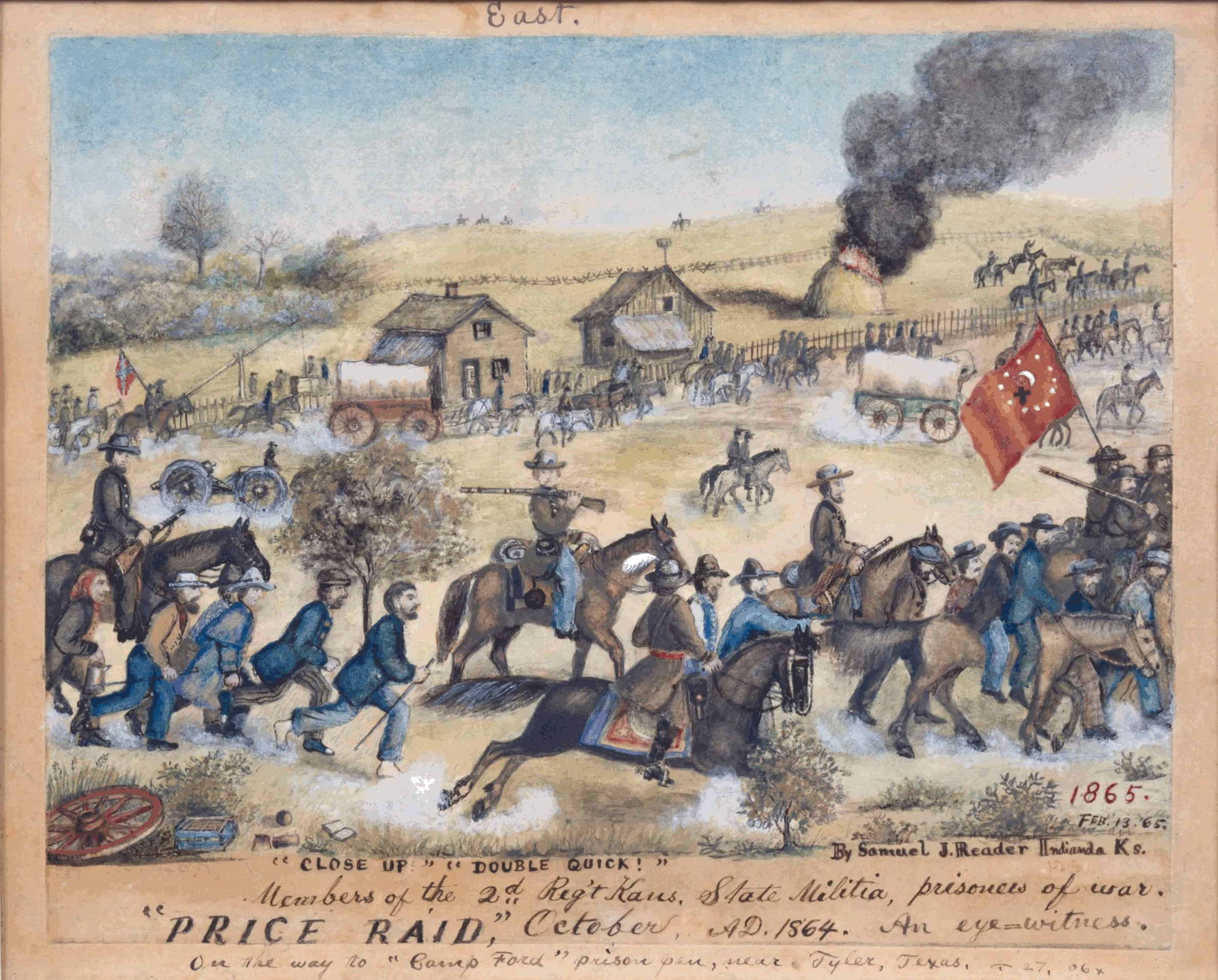
The Price Raid, 1865. Kansas Historical Society, Topeka, Kansas

He served as a sergeant of the Indianola Guards, a local militia group, and was a member of John Brown's forces, opposing slavery and supporting Kansas as a free state prior to the Civil War. In 1856, he participated in the conflict against the Border Ruffians and fought in the Battle of Hickory Point, coming "under fire" for the first time.

He was a second lieutenant and later paymaster of Company D of the Kansas state militia during the Civil War and fought in the Battle of Little Blue River (October 1864). He was captured and escaped three days later. He depicted the conflict in an oil painting, which is now in the collection of the Kansas Historical Society with four of his other paintings. His journal includes accounts of several Civil War battles, and his painting Before Dawn is used on the cover of the book Kansas's War: The Civil War in Documents (2011) by Pearl T. Ponce. He retired from service on October 30, 1864.

On December 18, 1867, he married Elizabeth Smith at La Harpe, Illinois. They had three children, the only one of whom survived was their daughter, Elizabeth. His wife died in 1898 in Topeka. He died at his home on September 15, 1914, and was buried in Rochester Cemetery.

== See also ==
- Lists of solved missing person cases
