= Winkler, Kansas =

Unincorporated community in Riley County, Kansas

Coordinates: 39°28′54″N 96°49′54″W

Winkler is an unincorporated community in Riley County, Kansas, United States.

== History ==
A post office was opened in Winkler in 1874, and remained in operation until it was discontinued in 1960, although at first the post office was called Winkler's Mills.

== Education ==
The community is served by Blue Valley USD 384 public school district.
