= May Day, Kansas =

Unincorporated community in Riley County, Kansas

Coordinates: 39.49333°N 96.91363°W

May Day is an unincorporated community in Riley County, Kansas, United States.

== History ==
A post office called May Day was established in 1871, and remained in operation until 1954. The post office originally was secured on a May Day, hence the name.

== Education ==
The community is served by Blue Valley USD 384 public school district.
