= The Columbian Theatre =

Music hall in Wamego, Kansas

Coordinates: 39.2029°N 96.3051°W

The Columbian Theatre is a richly historic music hall from the turn of the 20th century located in Wamego, Kansas.

== Early history ==
This music hall was built in 1893 by J. C. Rogers, a Wamego banker. He had been amazed by the scope and beauty of the exhibits at 1893 World's Columbian Exposition, which celebrated the 400th anniversary of Christopher Columbus’ discovery of America, The New World. The Exposition, more commonly known today as the Chicago World's Fair, was a “White City,” covering 633 acres (2.56 km^{2}) with 200 buildings. It was open for six months and had attendance which ranked as high as nearly one half for the entire population of the United States at that time.

This same fantasy land was Frank Baum’s inspiration a few years later when he described his Emerald City. So it is easy to understand Rogers’ fascination with the vision and his desire to recreate a music hall in that image in his own town. He purchased actual art and decor from the World's Fair once it had closed and this was used to create the plans for the Columbian Theatre.

=== As a music hall ===
In the late 1890s and early 1900s, the events at music halls consisted of a combination of community events, concerts, plays, masque balls and vaudeville. The Columbian Theatre was no exception to this and the hall became a center of entertainment activity for the local community.

== Original 1893 artwork ==
As part of Rogers purchases from the 1893 World's Columbian Exposition owners, he obtained a significant collection of artwork. Some of the paintings were done in oil, while more significantly, many of the paintings were created using distempera (which is a typically Northern European form of tempera which is oil or animal-glue-based paint). There are a total of twenty original Columbian Exposition paintings still in the collection.

The original six paintings that hung in the theatre were of a set of eight that was commissioned by the Federal Government. They are 11 feet (3.4 m) by 16 feet (4.9 m) in size. An article in Scientific American, Spring, 1894, listed J.C. Rogers as buying the eight paintings from the rotunda of the Government building. (The whereabouts of the remaining two are unknown.) They were likely painted by Ernest Theodore Behr (1861–1922).

East

West

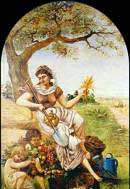
North

South

Steel and Industrial Trades

Architecture and Building Trades

== Current Activity ==
The Columbian Theatre is currently a local venue for theatre arts, such as plays and musicals. The concept which is in vogue is that of a “dinner theatre,” where patrons can come just for the performance or to make a whole evening with a dinner and performance. These productions take place in the beautifully decorated Peddicord Playhouse, which is a 288-seat theatre with proscenium stage and as was typical in 1890 music halls, a flat floor.

Today's Columbian Theatre Museum and Arts Center is an active member of the Manhattan Area Arts and Humanities Coalition .

== Trivia ==
- Frank Baum’s Wizard of Oz centers today in Wamego Wamego#Oz
