= Manhattan metropolitan area, Kansas =

Coordinates: 39°12′N 96°36′W

Manhattan metropolitan area Manhattan, Kansas Metropolitan Area
- Metropolitan Statistical Area
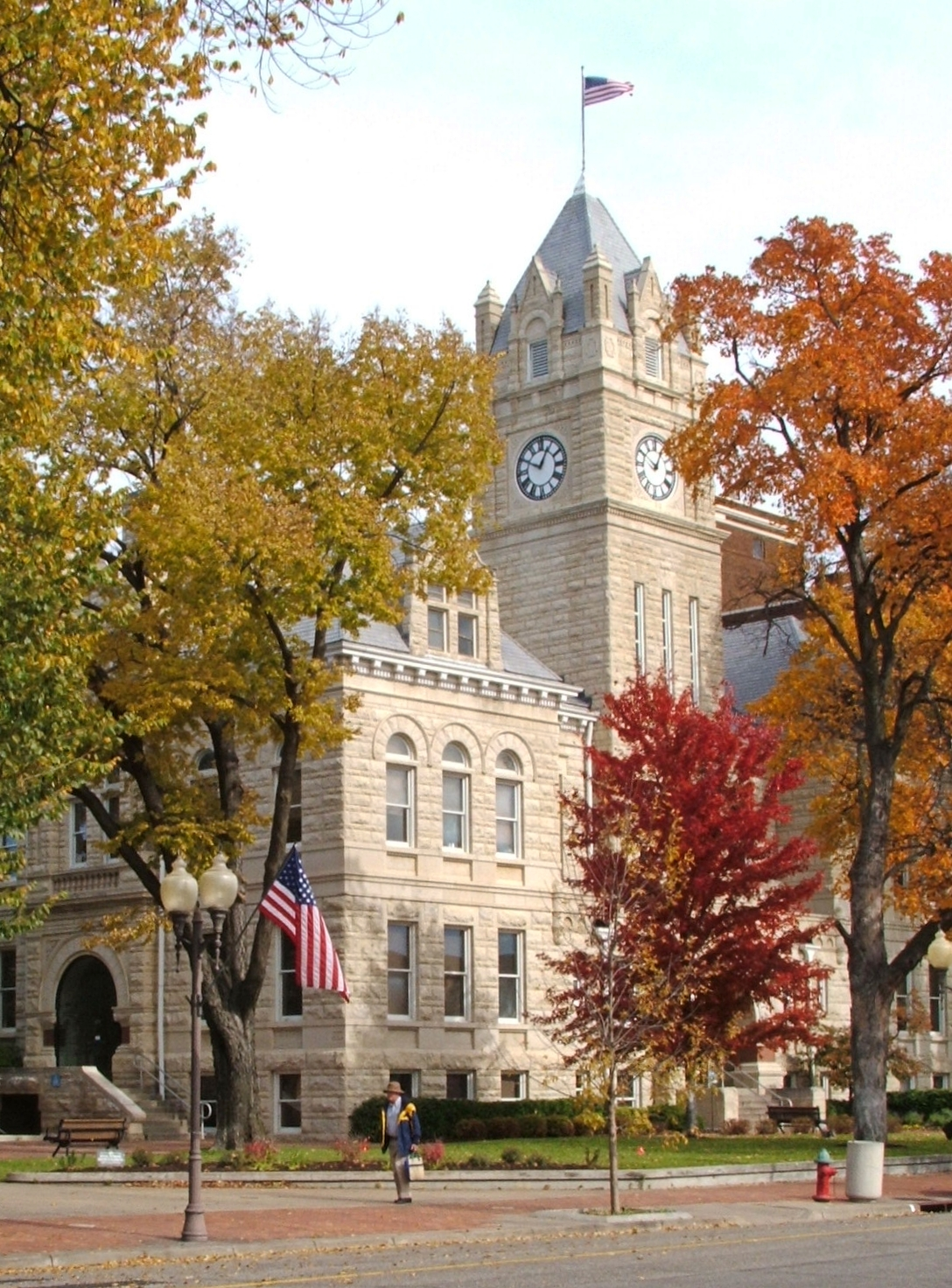
- Riley County Courthouse (2005)
Interactive Map of Manhattan, KS MSA
City of Manhattan
Manhattan, KS MSA
- Country: United States
- State: Kansas
- Principal city: Manhattan
- Time zone: UTC−6 (CST)
  - Summer (DST): UTC−5 (CDT)

The Manhattan–Junction City Combined Statistical Area, as defined by the United States Census Bureau, is an area consisting of three counties in northeastern Kansas, anchored by the city of Manhattan. It was upgraded from a Micropolitan Statistical Area (μSA) to a Metropolitan Statistical Area (MSA) by the Office of Management and Budget on November 20, 2008. It was changed from a Metropolitan Statistical Area (MSA) to a Combined Statistical Area (CSA) by the Office of Management and Budget on February 28, 2013.

As of the 2010 census, the MSA had a population of 127,081. As of July 1, 2014, the CSA had an estimated population of 134,804, making it the fourth largest urban area in Kansas.

== Counties ==
- Geary
- Pottawatomie
- Riley

== Communities ==
=== Places with more than 50,000 inhabitants ===
- Manhattan (Principal city) Pop: 54,100

=== Places with 1,000 to 25,000 inhabitants ===
- Junction City Pop: 22,932
- Fort Riley (census-designated place) Pop: 9,230
- Wamego Pop: 4,841
- St. Marys Pop: 2,759
- Grandview Plaza Pop: 1,661
- Ogden Pop: 1,560
- St. George Pop: 1,054

=== Places with 500 to 1,000 inhabitants ===
- Riley Pop: 938
- Westmoreland Pop: 740
- Onaga Pop: 679

=== Places with less than 500 inhabitants ===
- Leonardville Pop: 432
- Milford Pop: 408
- Olsburg Pop: 218
- Belvue Pop: 177
- Emmett Pop: 170
- Randolph Pop: 159
- Louisville Pop: 131
- Havensville Pop: 119
- Wheaton Pop: 98

=== Unincorporated places ===
- Ashland
- Bala
- Keats
- Rocky Ford
- Wreford
- Zeandale

== Demographics ==
As of the census of 2000, there were 108,999 people, 39,366 households, and 24,774 families residing within the MSA. The racial makeup of the MSA was 81.42% White, 9.73% African American, 0.65% Native American, 2.72% Asian, 0.20% Pacific Islander, 2.24% from other races, and 3.04% from two or more races. Hispanic or Latino of any race were 5.18% of the population.

The median income for a household in the MSA was $34,712, and the median income for a family was $43,374. Males had a median income of $28,055 versus $22,821 for females. The per capita income for the MSA was $16,778.

== See also ==
- Kansas census statistical areas
