= Zeandale, Kansas =

Census-designated place in Riley County, Kansas, United States

- Census-designated place
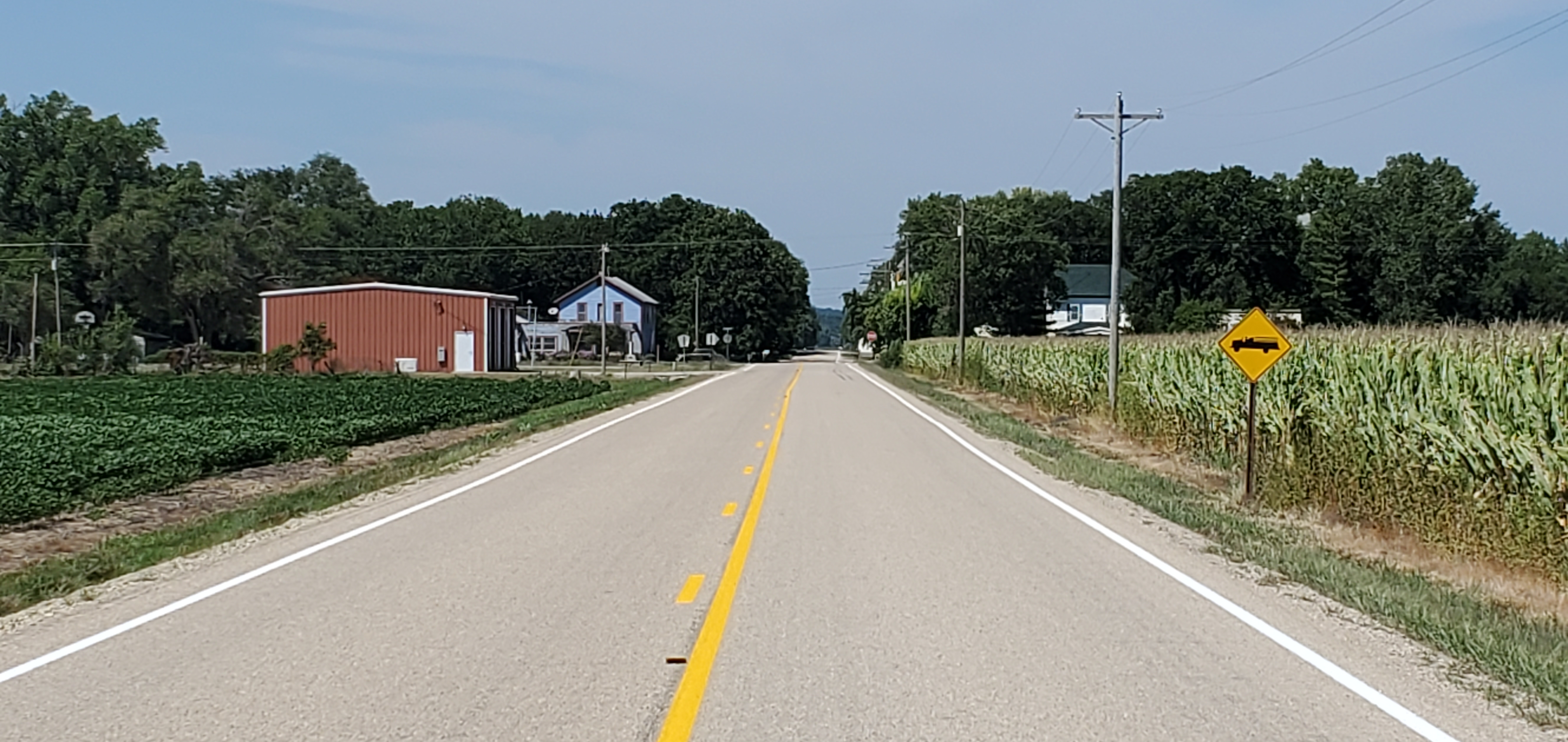
- Zeandale (2022)

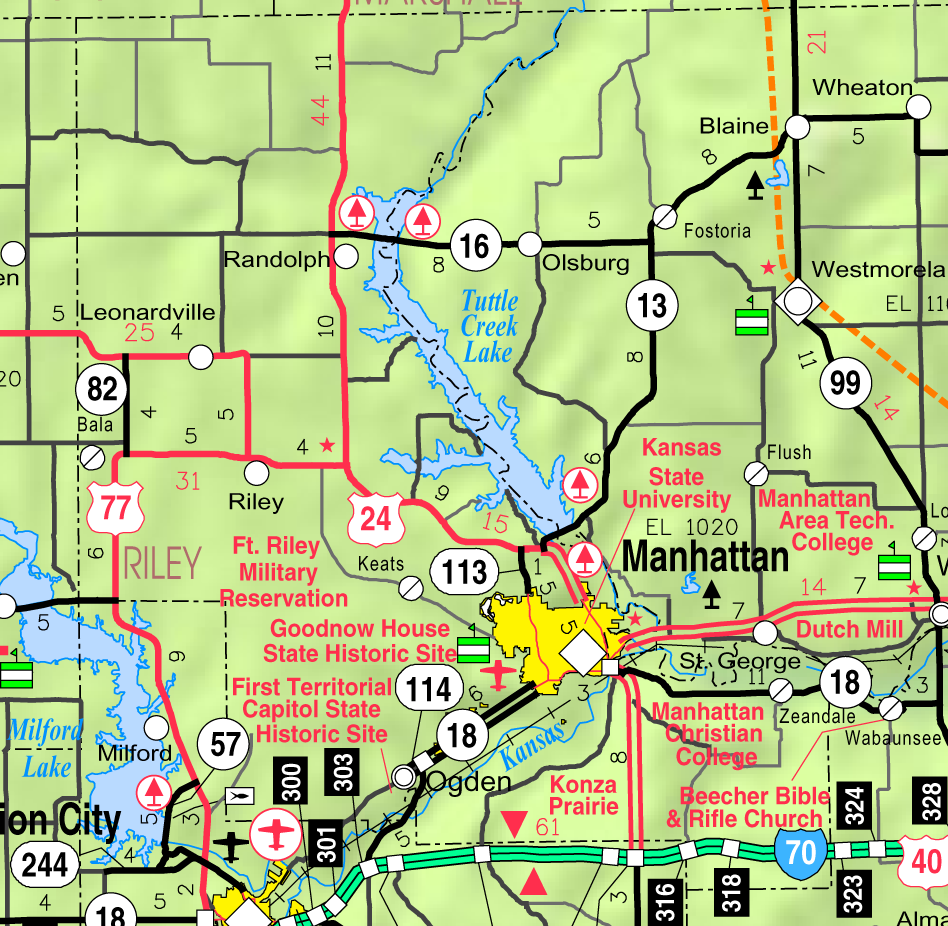
- KDOT map of Riley County (legend)

- Location within Kansas Location within the United States
- Coordinates: 39°09′34″N 96°25′36″W
- Country: United States
- State: Kansas
- Counties: Riley
- Founded: 1855
- Elevation: 1,011 ft (308 m)

Population (2020)
  - Total: 62
- Time zone: UTC-6 (CST)
  - Summer (DST): UTC-5 (CDT)
- Area code: 785
- FIPS code: 20-80875
- GNIS ID: 2804661

Zeandale is a census-designated place (CDP) in Riley County, Kansas, United States. As of the 2020 census, the population was 62. It is located approximately 6.8 miles (10.9 km) east of Manhattan at the intersection of Tabor Valley Rd and K-18 highway (aka Zeandale Rd).

== History ==
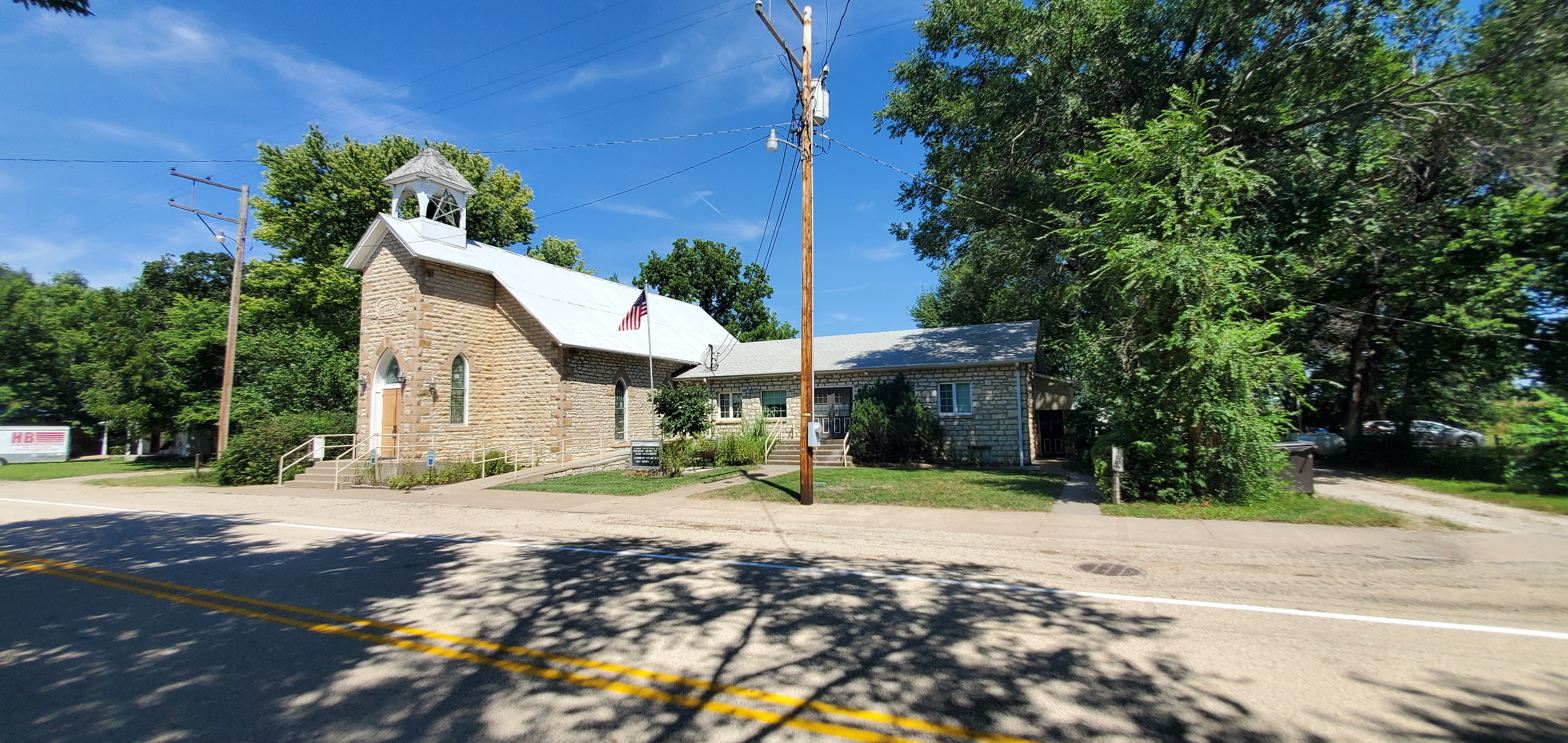
Zeandale Community Church (2022)

Zeandale was named by J.H. Pillsbury, who settled the township in 1855. The name is said to have been taken from the Greek, zea meaning "corn" and the English, dale. Zeandale had a post office from 1857 to 1944.

It is also home to Zeandale Community Church, established in 1896. The church was originally associated with the Stone-Campbell Restoration movement (Christian Church), but was re-established in the 1950s as a non-denominational community church.

The community has a rural, volunteer fire department, updated in 2002 with a new building.

Zeandale almost grew by a factor of four in 2005, when a Manhattan developer cited land for sale surrounding Zeandale as prime real-estate for the growing Manhattan market. However, Riley County zoning regulations prevented the subdivision, and inevitable incorporation.

== Geography ==
The elevation of the community is 1,011 feet (308 m) above sea level.

== Demographics ==
Zeandale is part of the Manhattan Metropolitan Statistical Area.

Historical population
| Census | Pop. | Note | %± |
|---|---|---|---|
| 2020 | 62 | | — |
U.S. Decennial Census

== Education ==
The community is served by Wamego USD 320 public school district.
