= Blue Valley USD 384 =

Public school district in Randolph, Kansas

Address
- 3 Ram Way Randolph, Kansas, 66554; United States
- Coordinates: 39.43371°N 96.76024°W

District information
- Type: Public
- Grades: K to 12
- Schools: 2

Other information
- Website: usd384.org

Blue Valley USD 384 is a public unified school district headquartered in Randolph, Kansas, United States. The district includes the communities of Randolph, Olsburg, Fostoria, May Day, Winkler, and nearby rural areas.

== Schools ==
The school district operates the following schools:

- Blue Valley High/Middle School in Randolph
- McCormick Elementary School in Olsburg

== See also ==
- List of high schools in Kansas
- List of unified school districts in Kansas
