= Wamego USD 320 =

Public school district in Wamego, Kansas

Address
- 510 East Highway 24 Wamego, Kansas, 66547; United States
- Coordinates: 39°12′38″N 96°17′58″W

District information
- Type: Public
- Grades: K to 12
- Schools: 4

Other information
- Website: usd320.com

Wamego USD 320 is a public unified school district headquartered in Wamego, Kansas, United States. The district includes the communities of Wamego, Belvue, Louisville, Wabaunsee, Zeandale, and nearby rural areas. It is mostly in Pottawatomie County, with portions in Riley and Wabaunsee counties.

== Schools ==
The school district operates the following schools:

- Wamego High School in Wamego.
- Wamego Middle School in Wamego.
- Central Elementary School in Wamego.
- West Elementary School in Wamego.

== History ==
Denise O'Dea served as superintendent until she resigned in 2016.

== See also ==
- Kansas State Department of Education
- Kansas State High School Activities Association
- List of high schools in Kansas
- List of unified school districts in Kansas
