= Wamego, Kansas =

City in Pottawatomie County, Kansas

- City
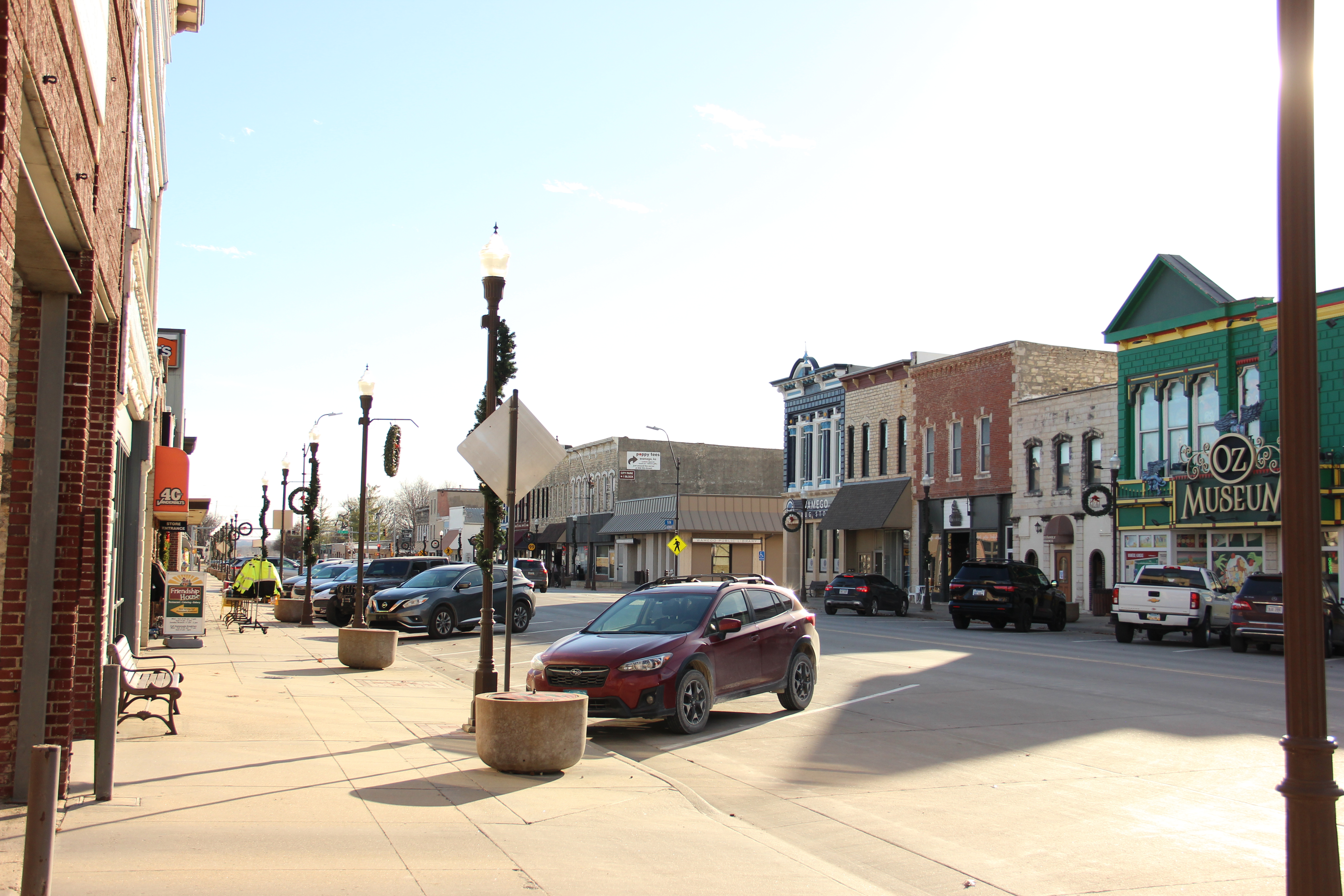
- Downtown Wamego (2025)

- Location within Pottawatomie County and Kansas

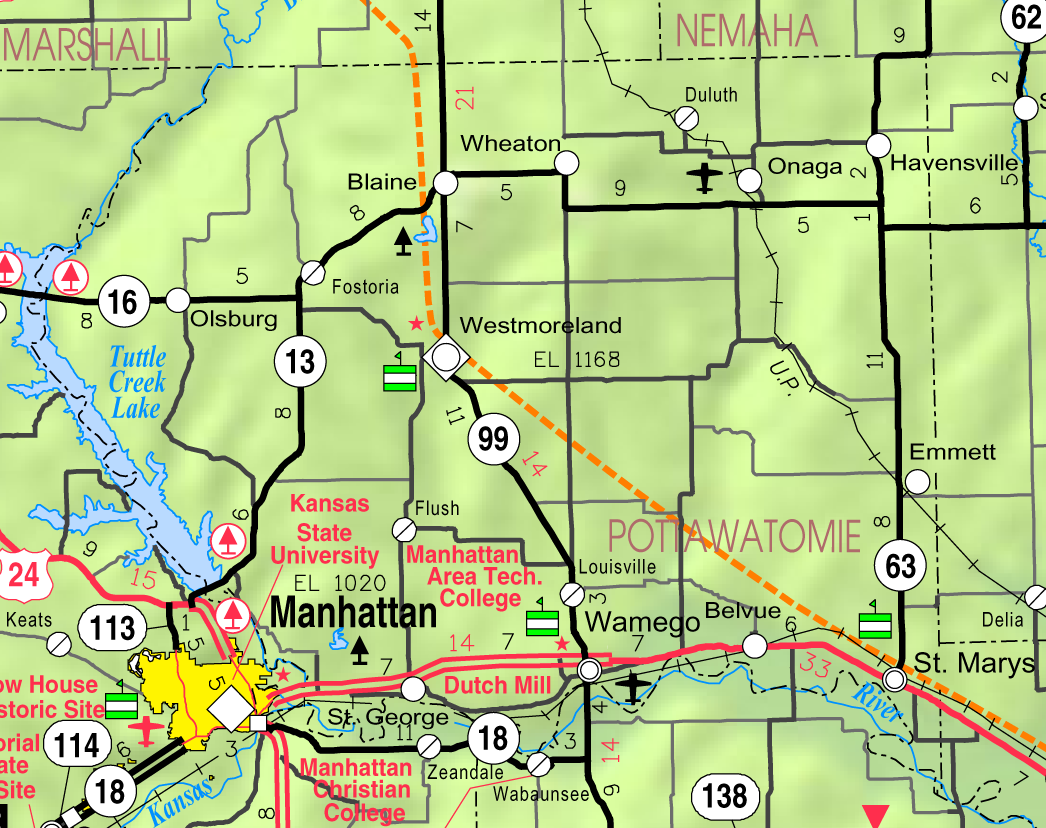
- KDOT map of Pottawatomie County (legend)
- Coordinates: 39°12′18″N 96°18′36″W
- Country: United States
- State: Kansas
- County: Pottawatomie
- Platted: 1866
- Incorporated: 1869

Area
  - Total: 2.41 sq mi (6.25 km^{2})
  - Land: 2.37 sq mi (6.14 km^{2})
  - Water: 0.039 sq mi (0.10 km^{2})
- Elevation: 1,053 ft (321 m)

Population (2020)
  - Total: 4,841
  - Density: 2,040/sq mi (788/km^{2})
- Time zone: UTC-6 (CST)
  - Summer (DST): UTC-5 (CDT)
- ZIP Code: 66547
- Area code: 785
- FIPS code: 20-75325
- GNIS ID: 2397188
- Website: wamego.org

Wamego /wɔːˈmiːɡoʊ/ is a city in Pottawatomie County, Kansas, United States. As of the 2020 census, the population of the city was 4,841.

== History ==
Wamego was platted in 1866. It was named for a Potawatomi Native American chief.

The first post office in Wamego was established in October 1866.

== Geography ==
According to the United States Census Bureau, the city has a total area of 2.25 square miles (5.83 km^{2}), of which 2.21 square miles (5.72 km^{2}) is land and 0.04 square miles (0.10 km^{2}) is water.

Wamego is located at the intersection of U.S. Route 24 and K-99. It is approximately 14 mi (23 km) east of Manhattan; and about 42 mi (68 km) west-northwest of Topeka. The Kansas River flows along the southern edge of the city.

=== Climate ===
The climate in this area is characterized by hot, humid summers and generally mild to cool winters. According to the Köppen Climate Classification system, Wamego has a humid subtropical climate, abbreviated "Cfa" on climate maps.

== Demographics ==
Historical population
Census	Pop.	Note	%±
1890	1,473		—
1900	1,618		9.8%
1910	1,714		5.9%
1920	1,585		−7.5%
1930	1,647		3.9%
1940	1,767		7.3%
1950	1,869		5.8%
1960	2,363		26.4%
1970	2,507		6.1%
1980	3,159		26.0%
1990	3,706		17.3%
2000	4,246		14.6%
2010	4,372		3.0%
2020	4,841		10.7%
U.S. Decennial Census

Wamego is part of the Manhattan, Kansas Metropolitan Statistical Area.

=== 2020 census ===
As of the 2020 census, Wamego had a population of 4,841. The median age was 35.7 years. 26.5% of residents were under the age of 18 and 15.7% of residents were 65 years of age or older. For every 100 females there were 92.0 males, and for every 100 females age 18 and over there were 90.0 males age 18 and over.

99.4% of residents lived in urban areas, while 0.6% lived in rural areas.

There were 1,932 households in Wamego, of which 33.7% had children under the age of 18 living in them. Of all households, 49.9% were married-couple households, 16.8% were households with a male householder and no spouse or partner present, and 26.3% were households with a female householder and no spouse or partner present. About 29.6% of all households were made up of individuals and 12.4% had someone living alone who was 65 years of age or older.

There were 2,051 housing units, of which 5.8% were vacant. The homeowner vacancy rate was 1.5% and the rental vacancy rate was 8.8%.

Racial composition as of the 2020 census
Race	Number	Percent
White	4,374	90.4%
Black or African American	48	1.0%
American Indian and Alaska Native	30	0.6%
Asian	36	0.7%
Native Hawaiian and Other Pacific Islander	4	0.1%
Some other race	40	0.8%
Two or more races	309	6.4%
Hispanic or Latino (of any race)	236	4.9%

=== 2010 census ===
As of the census of 2010, there were 4,372 people, 1,758 households, and 1,176 families living in the city. The population density was 1,978.3 inhabitants per square mile (763.8/km^{2}). There were 1,882 housing units at an average density of 851.6 per square mile (328.8/km^{2}). The racial makeup of the city was 94.1% White, 0.8% African American, 0.6% Native American, 0.5% Asian, 0.1% Pacific Islander, 1.0% from other races, and 2.9% from two or more races. Hispanic or Latino of any race were 3.9% of the population.

There were 1,758 households, of which 37.3% had children under the age of 18 living with them, 51.1% were married couples living together, 11.6% had a female householder with no husband present, 4.2% had a male householder with no wife present, and 33.1% were non-families. 27.5% of all households were made up of individuals, and 12.2% had someone living alone who was 65 years of age or older. The average household size was 2.45 and the average family size was 3.00.

The median age in the city was 33.3 years. 27.3% of residents were under the age of 18; 8.5% were between the ages of 18 and 24; 28.6% were from 25 to 44; 22.3% were from 45 to 64; and 13.3% were 65 years of age or older. The gender makeup of the city was 47.6% male and 52.4% female.

== Area attractions ==
=== Wamego City Park ===
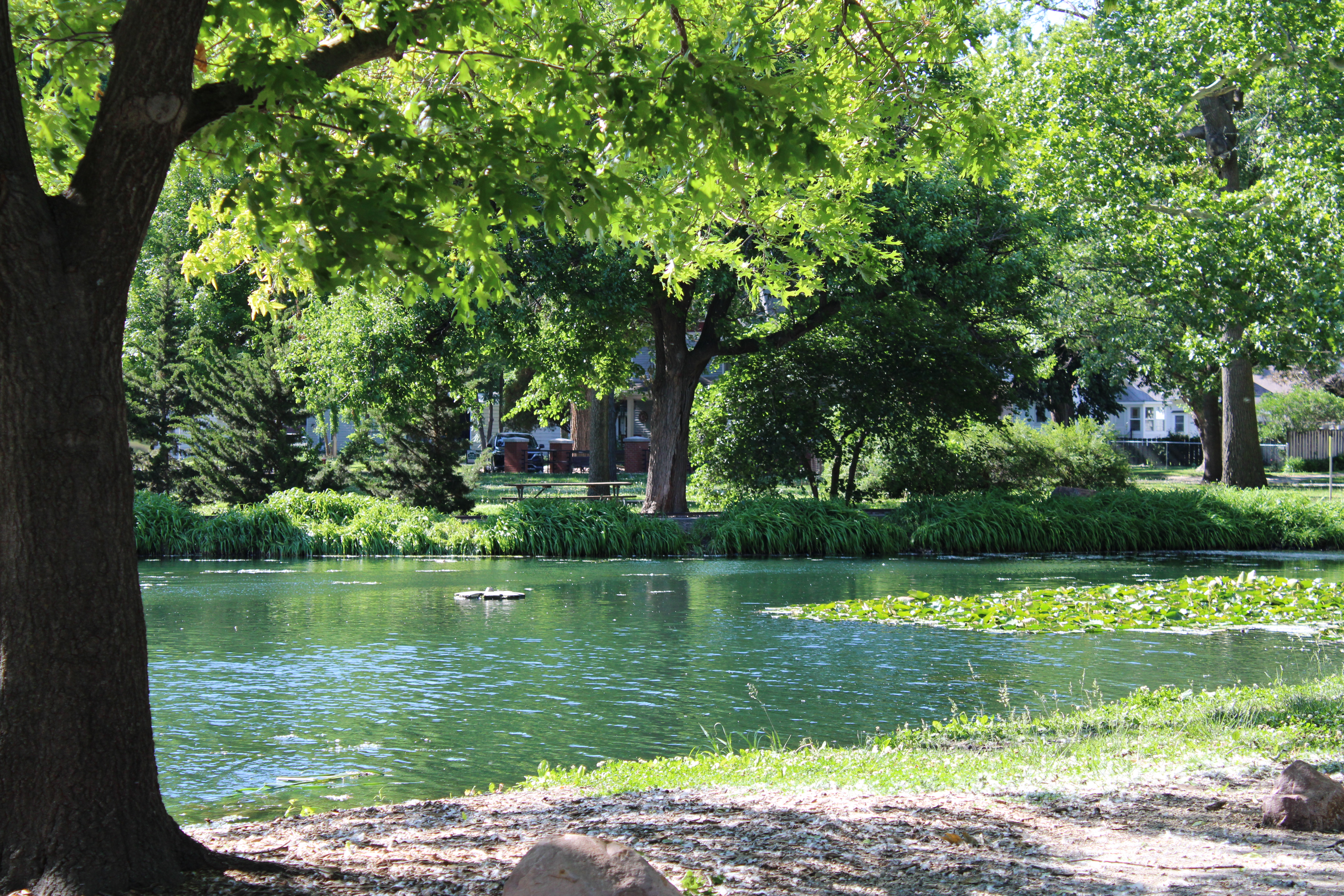
Fishing pond in city park (2026)

Wamego is home to a 12-acre park in the center of town that includes several historic features. The Dutch Mill, a stone windmill built in 1879, is located in the park, along with the Wamego Historical Museum and Prairie Town Village. Prairie Town Village is a collection of buildings from the 1800s that are a part of Wamego's history. The City Park includes a swimming pool, tennis courts, playground, and fishing pond.

=== Oz Museum ===
Wamego is home to a museum dedicated to The Wizard of Oz, featuring a collection of over 25,000 Oz artifacts on permanent loan from Friar Johnpaul Cafiero. The Museum was founded in April 2004, and led to the development of several other small businesses with the Oz theme, which have come to be known as the "Oz Cluster." Prominent Oz-related businesses include the Oz Winery, Lincoln Street Station, Barleycorns and Toto's Tacoz. On the first weekend of October, Wamego holds its Annual OZtoberFEST, an Oktoberfest-type celebration with an Oz theme. The annual street festival typically hosts Hot Air Balloon Rides, Tallgrass Brewery Beer Garden, the Yellow Brick Road Bike Ride, and a local stage or music production. On October 2, 2026, the World's Tallest Toto was installed in Railroad Park.

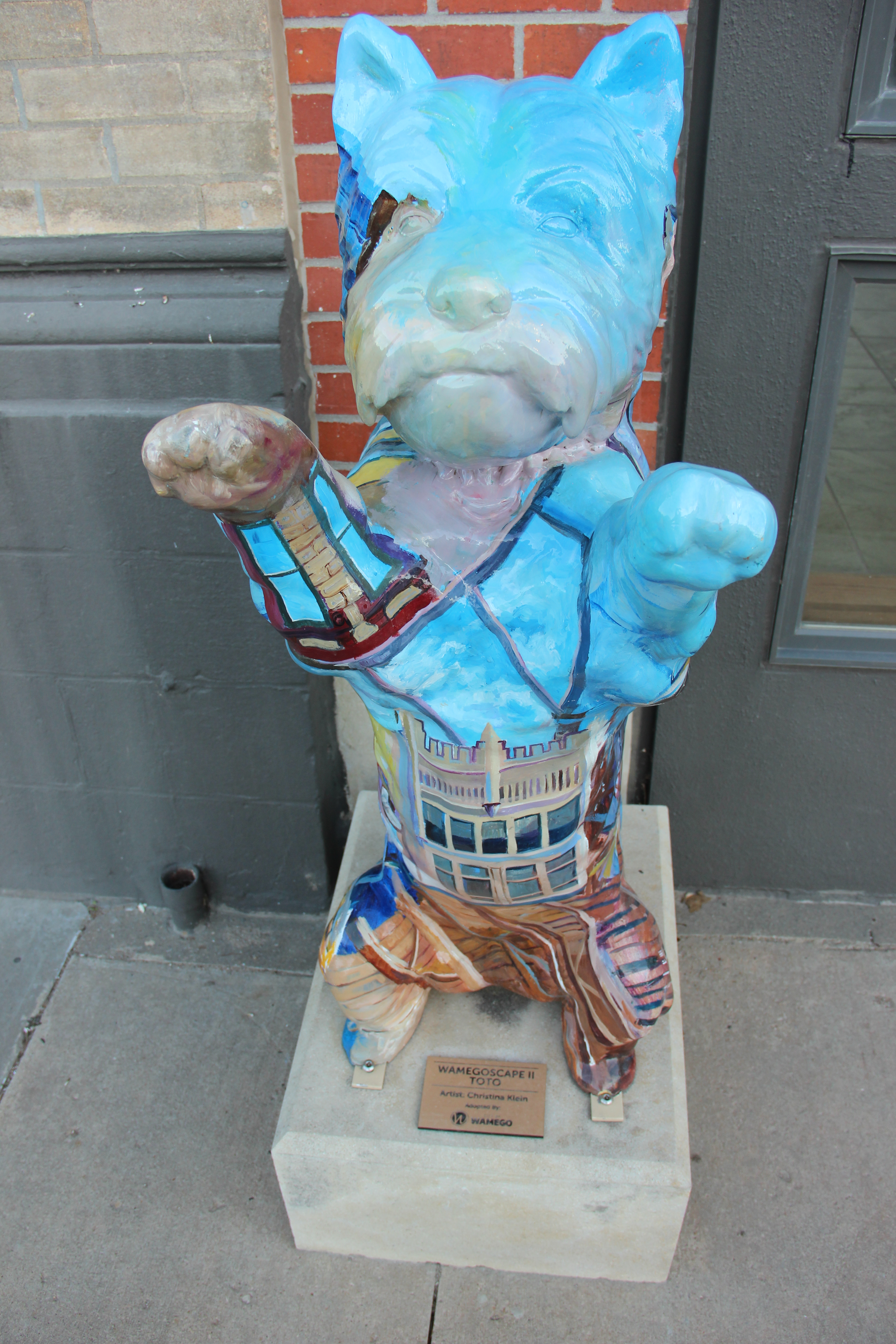
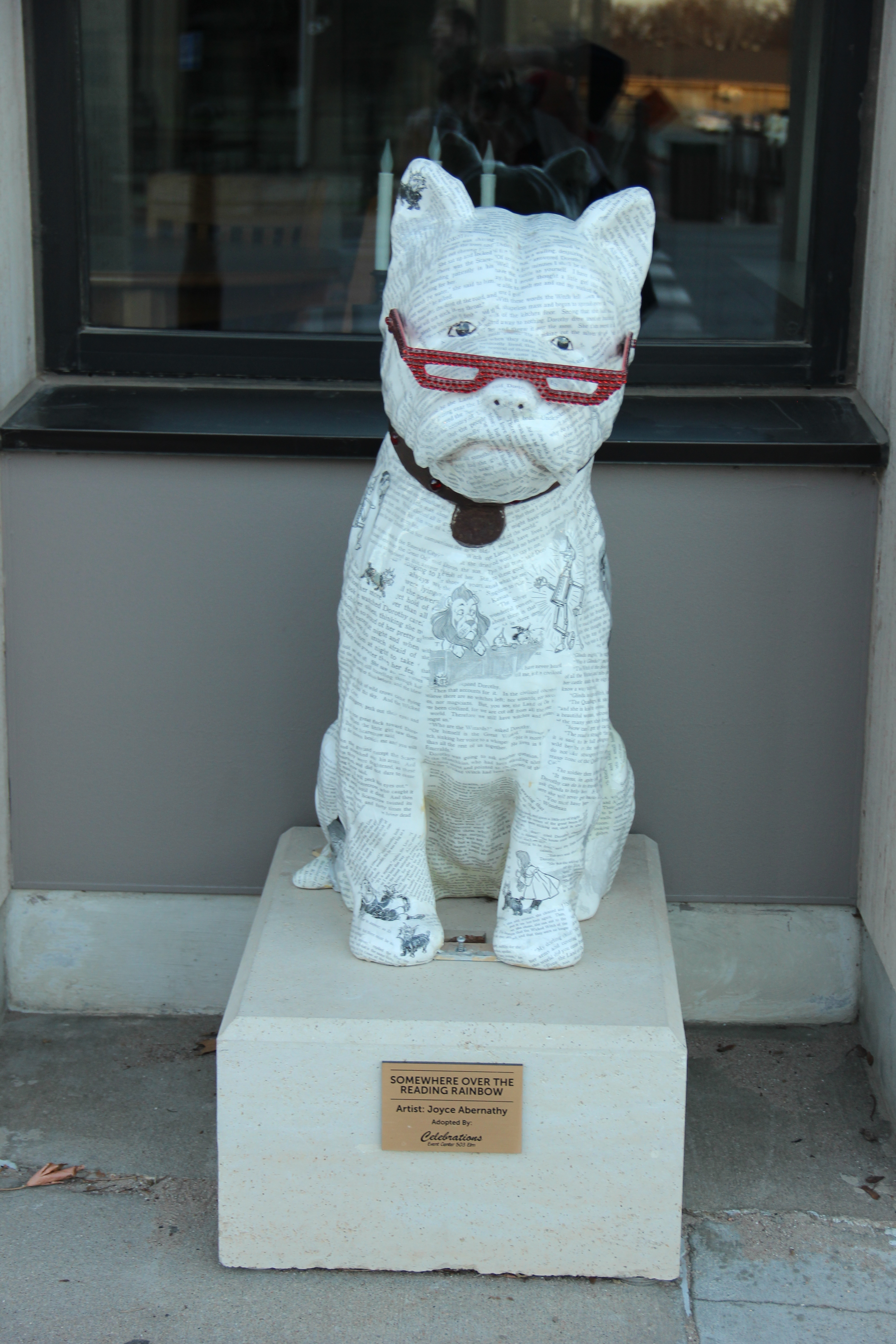
Toto (Oz) sculptures are scattered around the town.

=== Points of interest ===
- The Columbian Theatre
- Wamego City Park, Windmill, and Wamego Area Veterans Memorial
- Poppyfield Gallery
- Patti Page Exhibit

== Area events ==
- Independence Day celebration - annually the city holds a week long festival to celebrate Americas Independence Day holding a carnaval, parade, and fireworks show.

== Education ==
The community is served by Wamego USD 320 public school district, which provides Kindergarten through 12th grade public education. Highland Community College has a branch facility in the city.

== Filmmaking ==
Wamego served as the backdrop for the independent film production of Steve Balderson's surrealist crime drama, Firecracker.

== Gallery ==
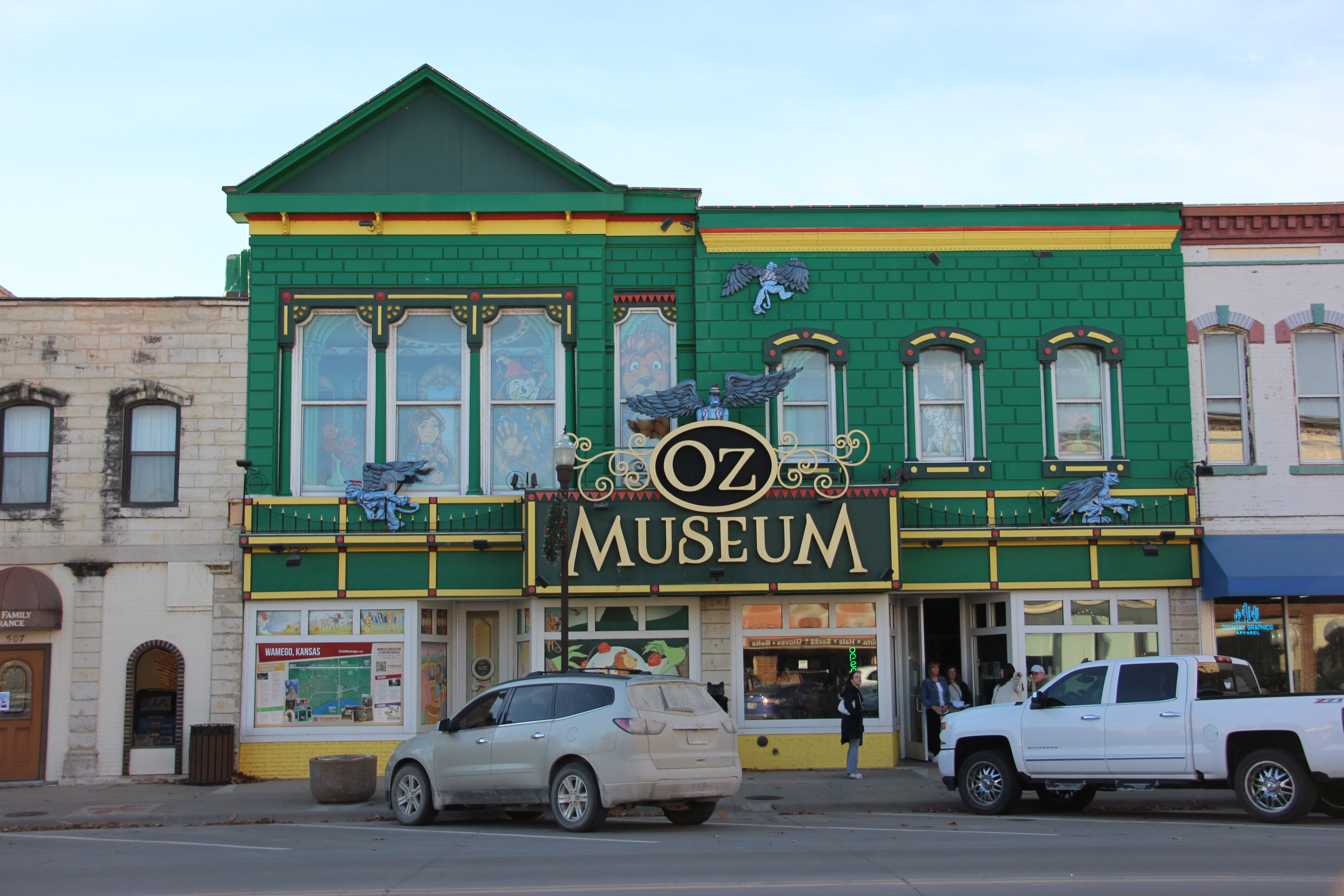
OZ Museum (2025)

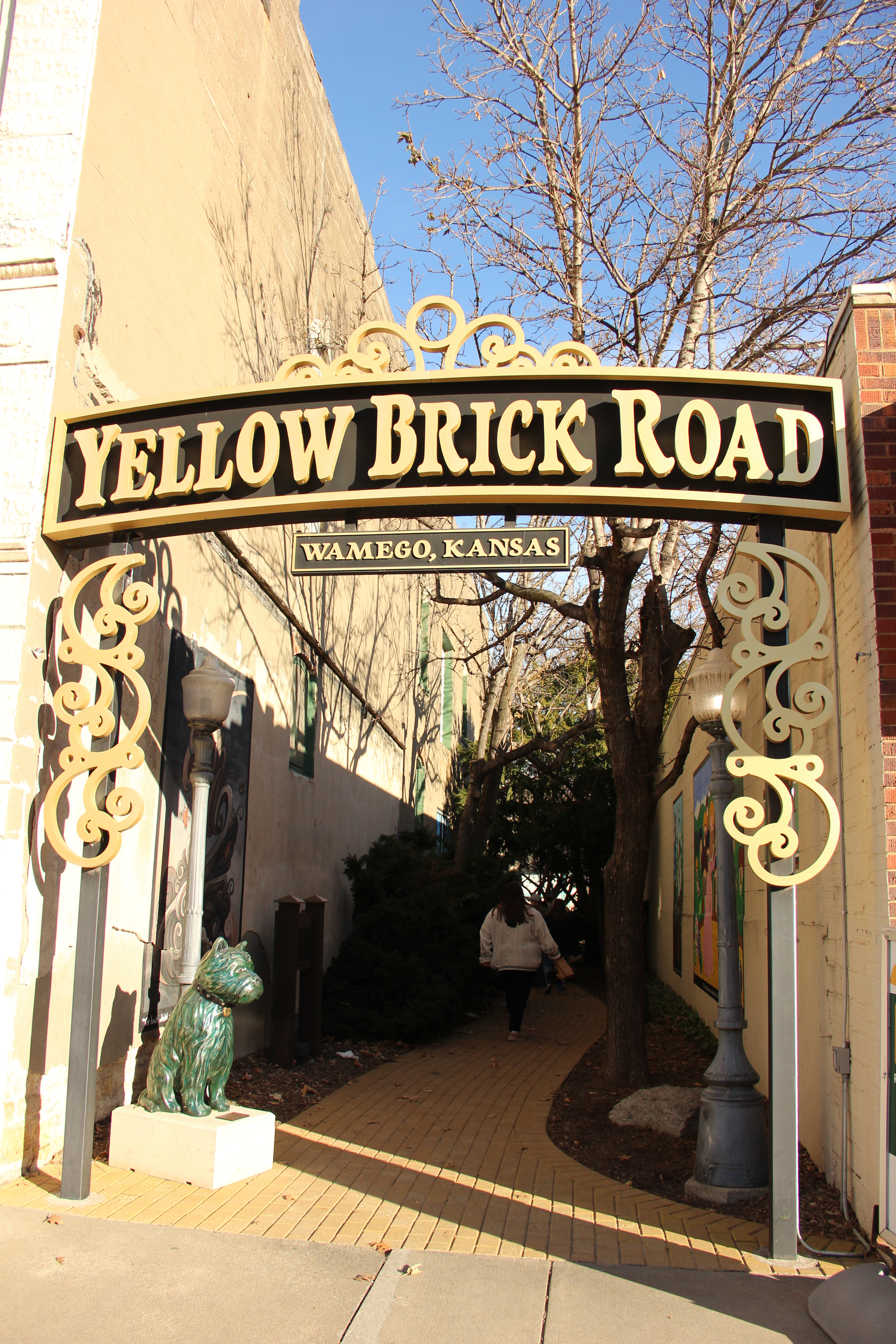
Yellow Brick Road path

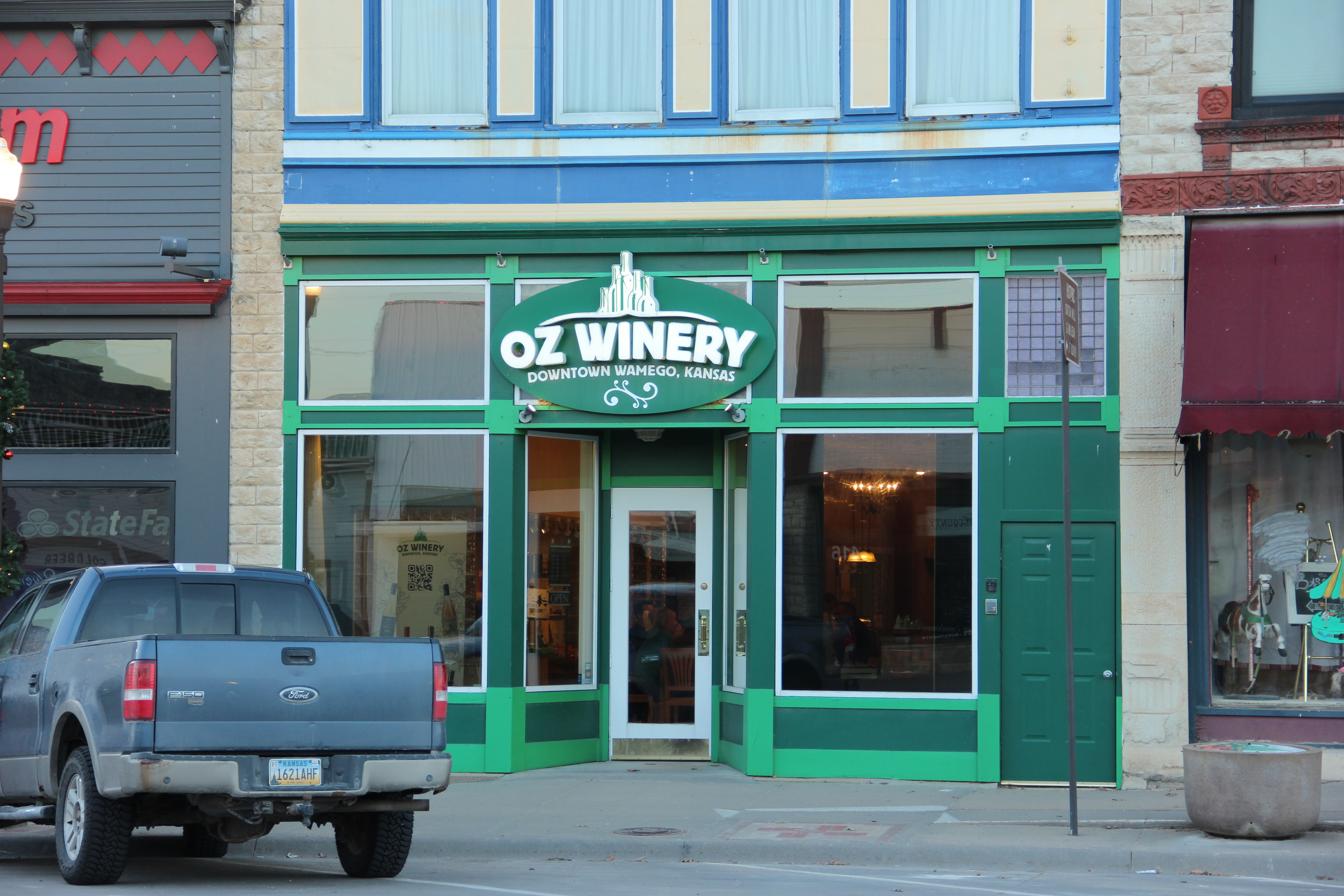
Oz Winery (2025)

Toto's Tacoz (2008)

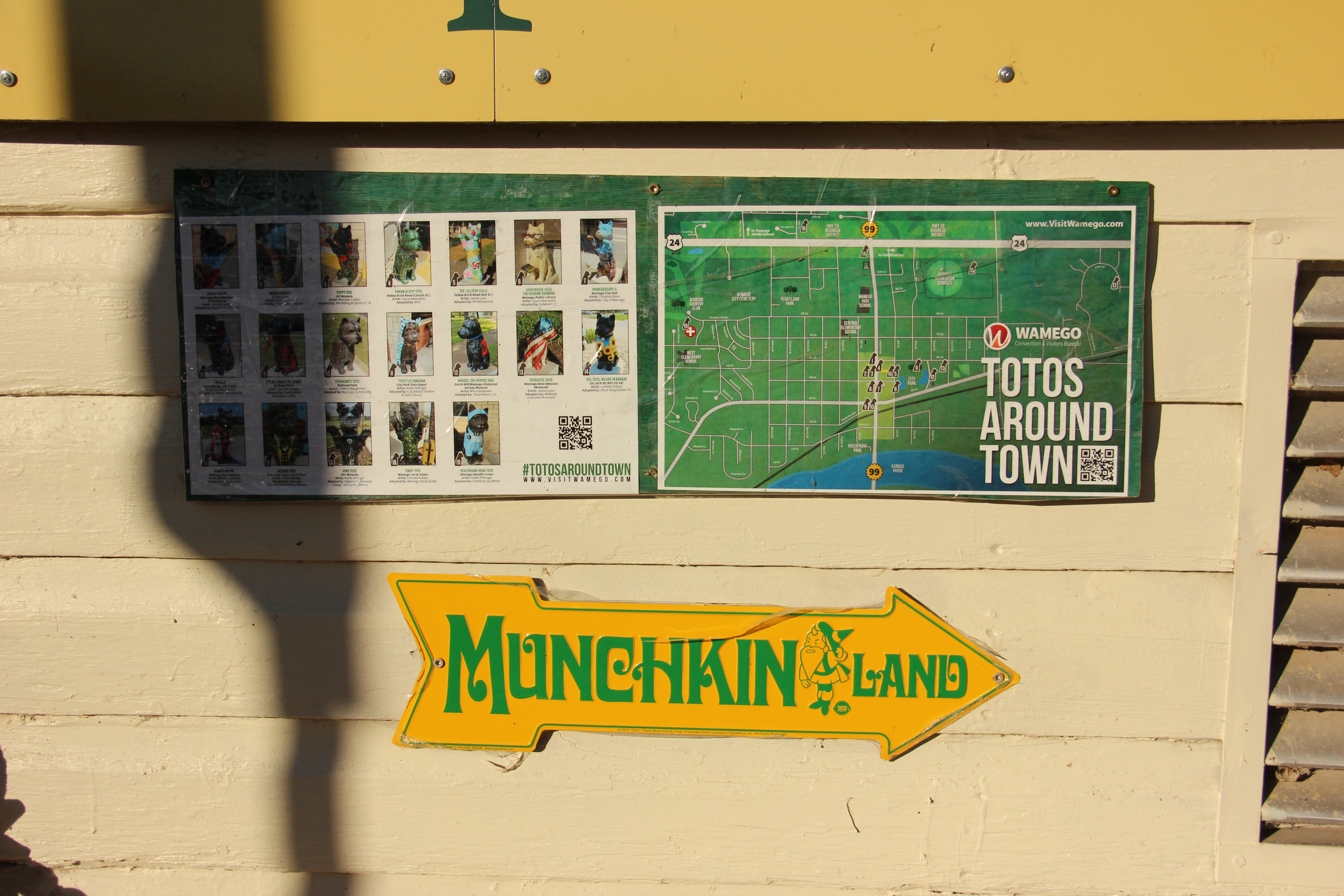
Directory of Toto sculptures

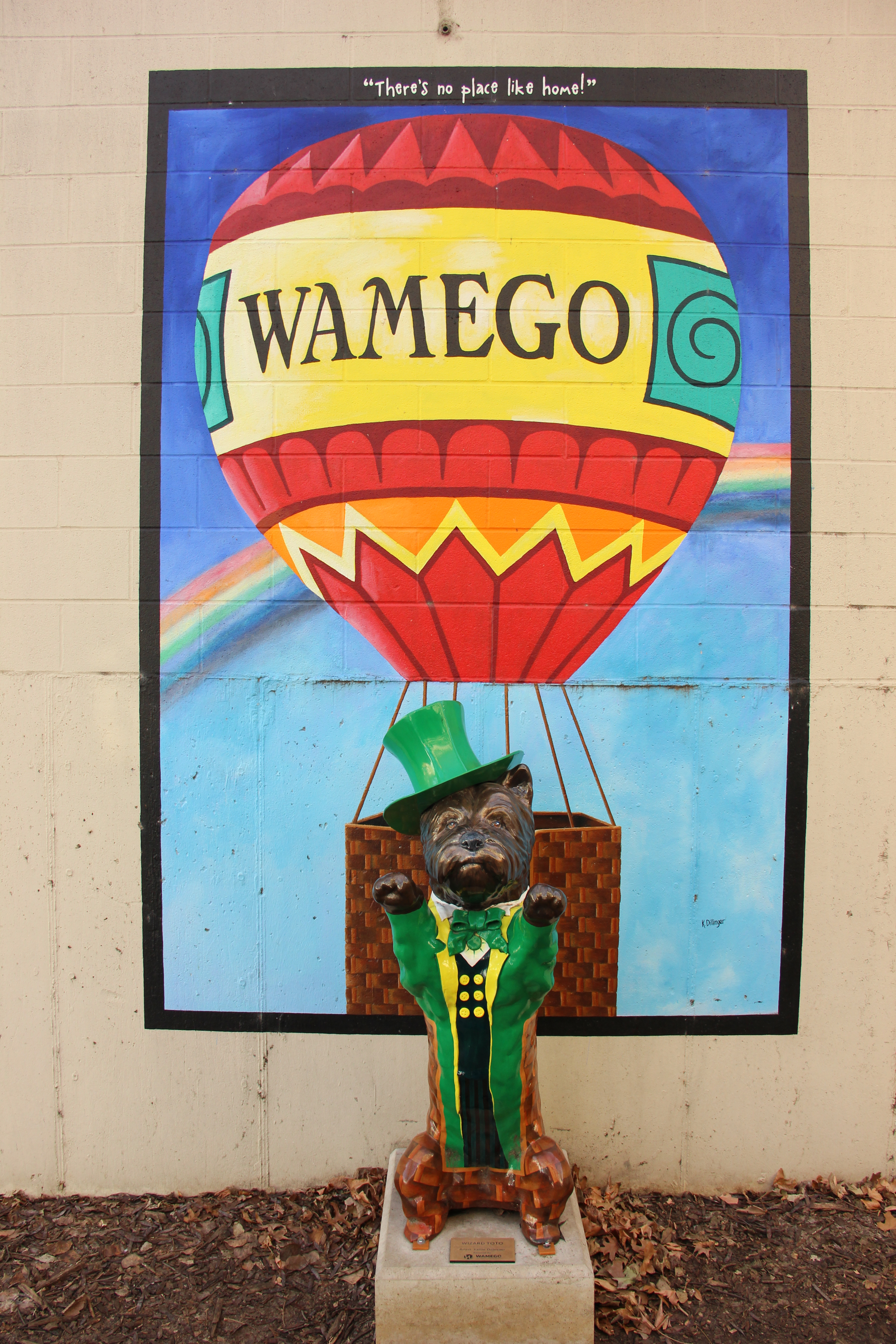
Wizard of Oz mural and Toto

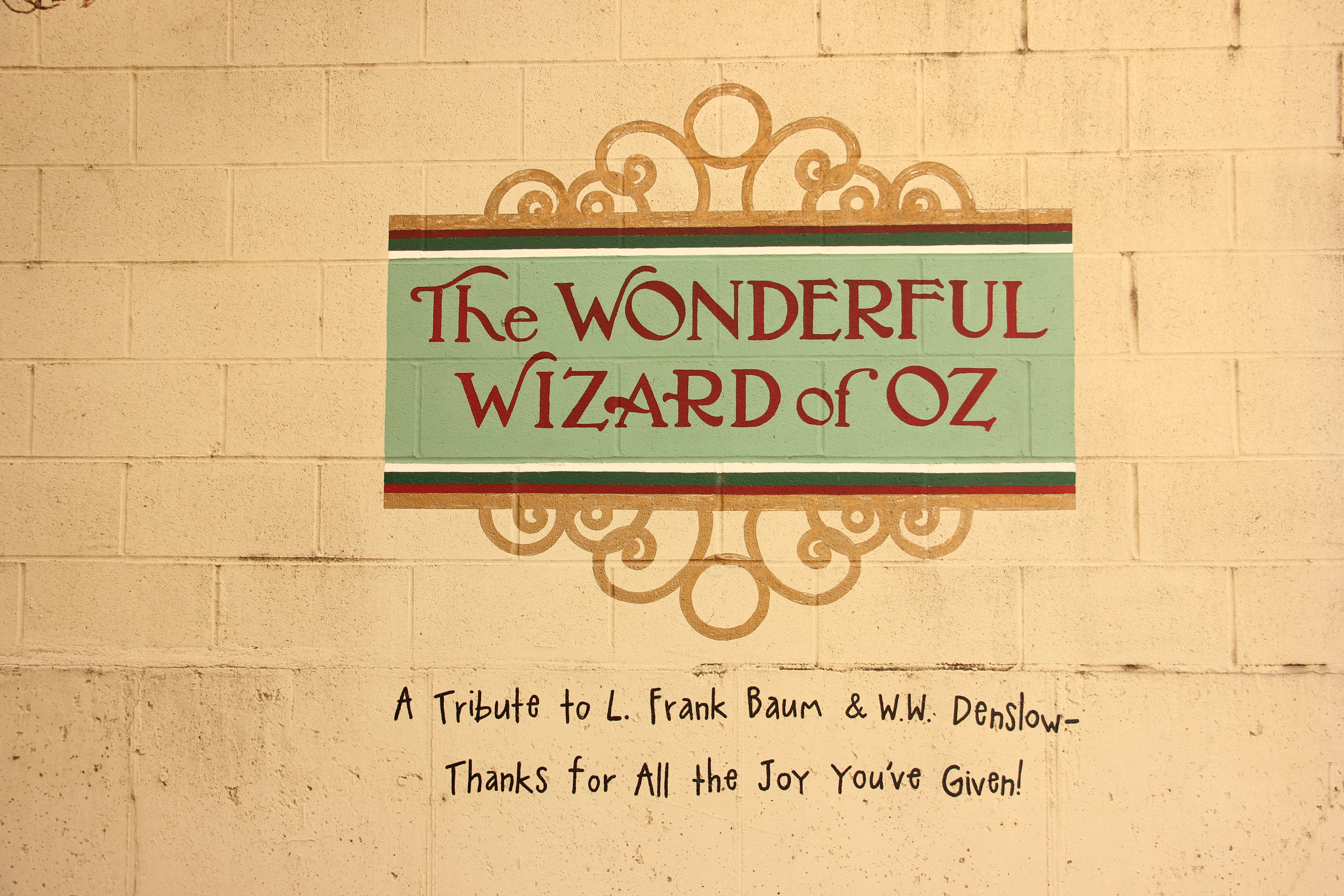
Wizard of Oz mural

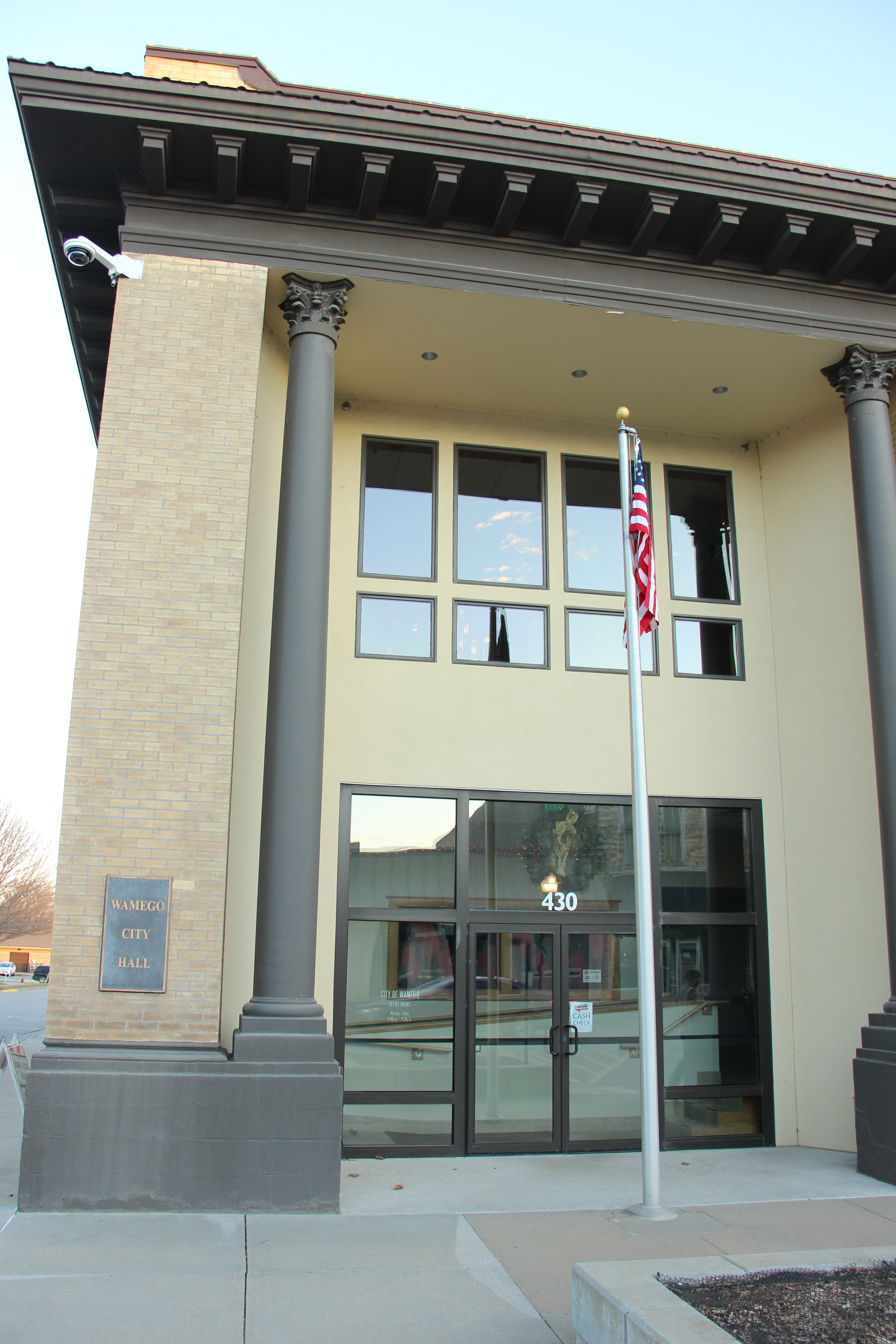
Wamego City Hall

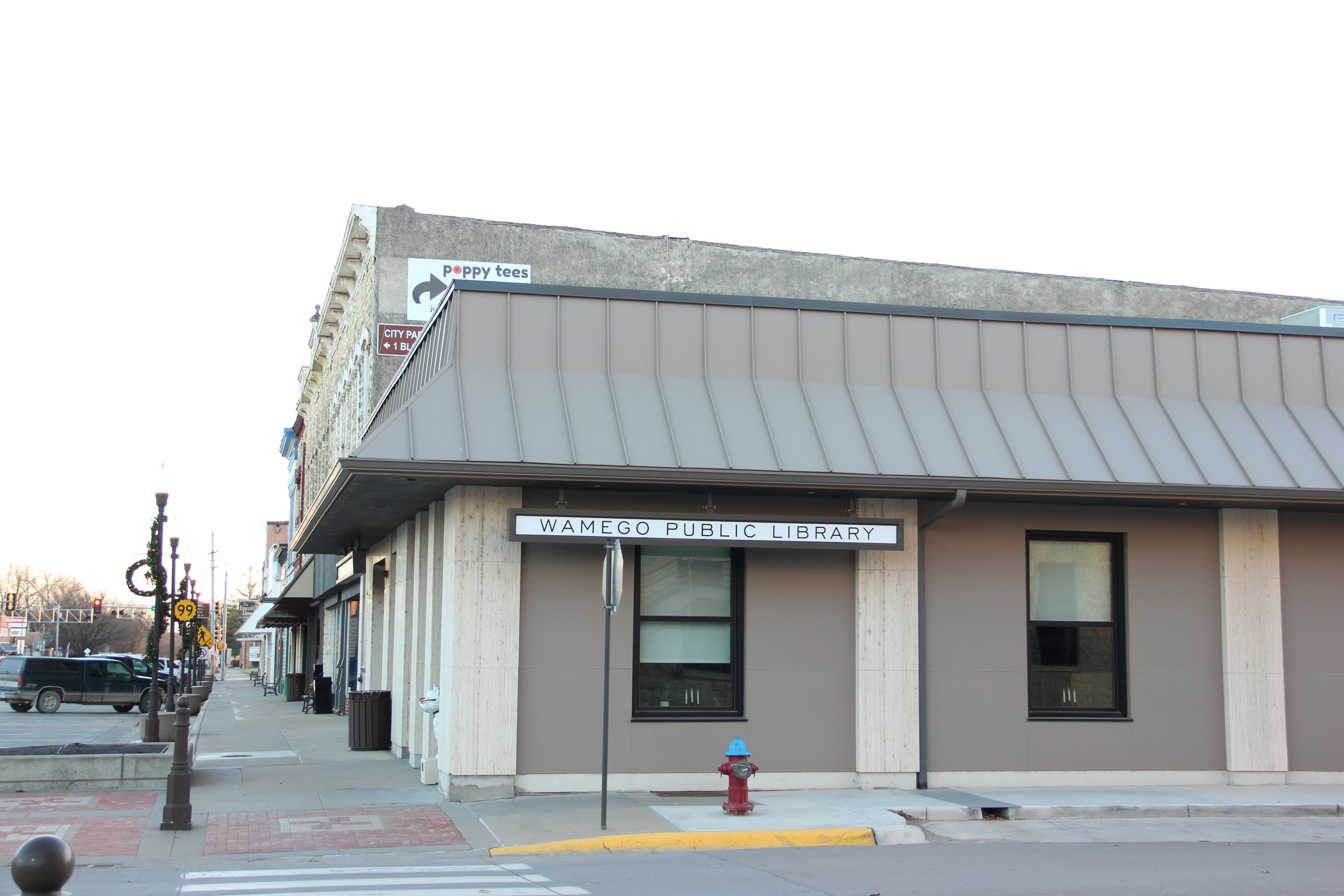
Wamego library

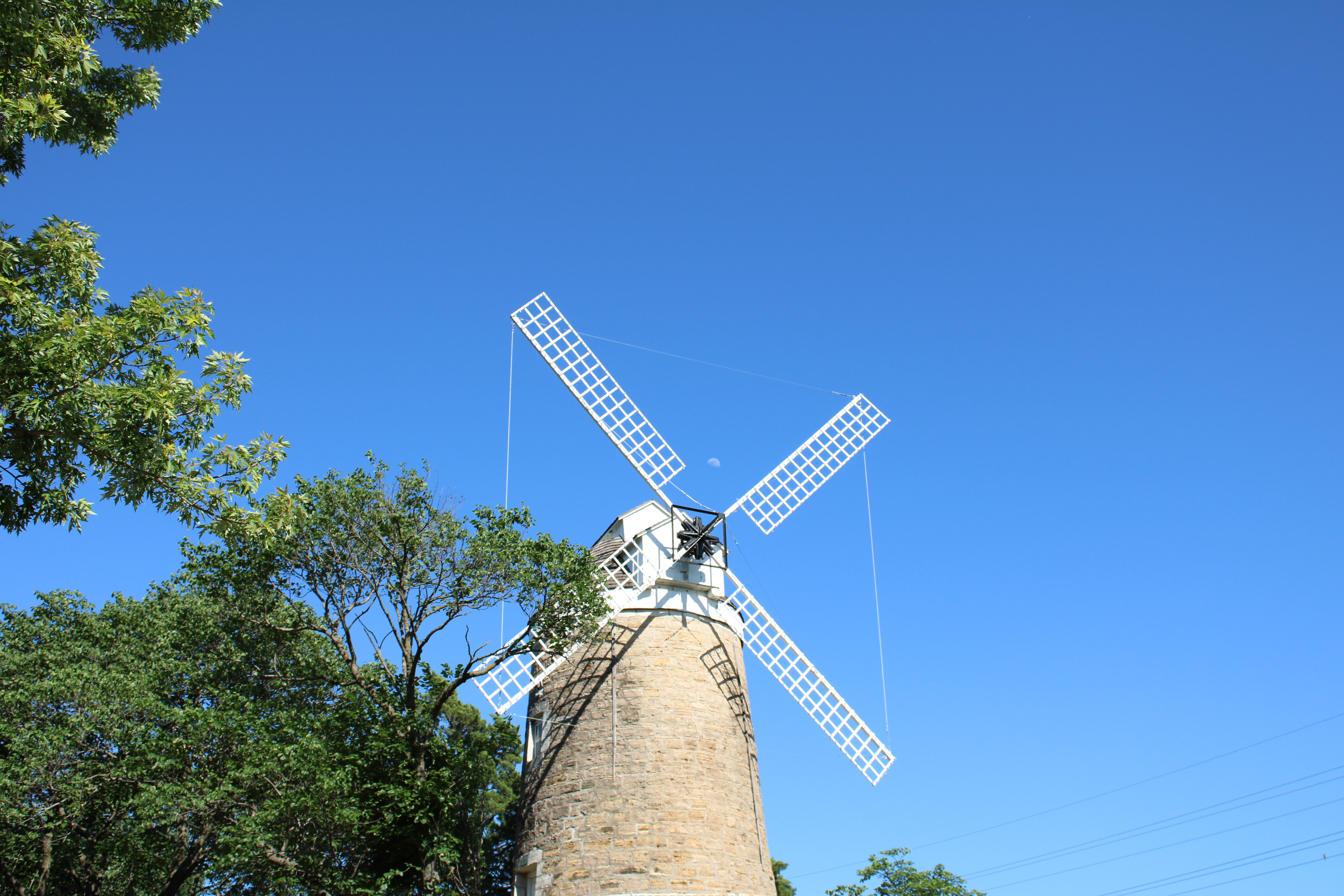
This windmill was built in 1879 north of Wamego. It was later relocated to Wamego in 1925.

== Notable people ==
- Steve Balderson, filmmaker
- Benjamin Butler, painter
- Walter Chrysler, automobile manufacturer, founder of Chrysler Corporation, born in Wamego but soon after his birth, his parents moved to Ellis, Kansas
- Delmas Hill, federal judge, U.S. Court of Appeals
- Maggie May, model, Playboy playmate
- Travis Metcalf, professional baseball player
- William Pickard, LSD chemist, was arrested one mile northwest of Wamego, serving two life sentences in federal prison
- Wiley Taylor, professional baseball player

== See also ==
- Great Flood of 1951
