= Indianola, Kansas =

Coordinates: 39°6′12.5″N 95°42′6.04″W

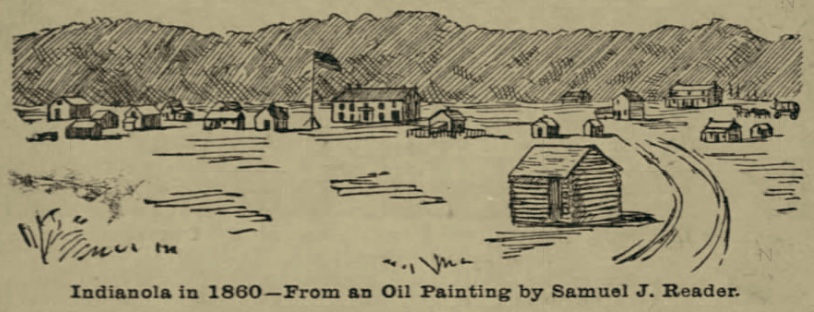
A sketch of Indianola, Kansas in 1860, by Samuel J. Reader, published in the Topeka State Journal in 1901

Indianola, also known as Indianola townsite, was a settlement in Shawnee County, Kansas north of Topeka. It was established in 1854 along the government and stage road between Fort Riley and Fort Leavenworth, and received more visitors than the nearby town of Topeka. At the time, the area was part of the Kansas Territory. Samuel J. Reader settled in the area in 1855 and established a farm at the age of 19. He stayed in the area and kept a diary about local events, including Bleeding Kansas, Civil War events, and area skirmishes.

Prior to the American Civil War, the town was primarily proslavery and its residents were often at odds with Topeka residents who wanted Kansas to be a free state. For instance, on August 30, 1856, there were proslavery supporters who caused an incident. The local militia was brought in to prevent fire and theft. Although it was called the Battle of Indianola, there was no fighting. Once the war began, however, many Indianola residents joined the Union Army. Company F of the Fifteenth Kansas Cavalry was recruited in the town to fight for the Union Army during the war.

Town residents began to move away from Indianola after the Kansas Pacific Railway built their railroad line through Topeka in or after 1865. The post office was discontinued December 29, 1868.
