= Randolph, Kansas =

City in Riley County, Kansas

- City
- Location within Riley County and Kansas

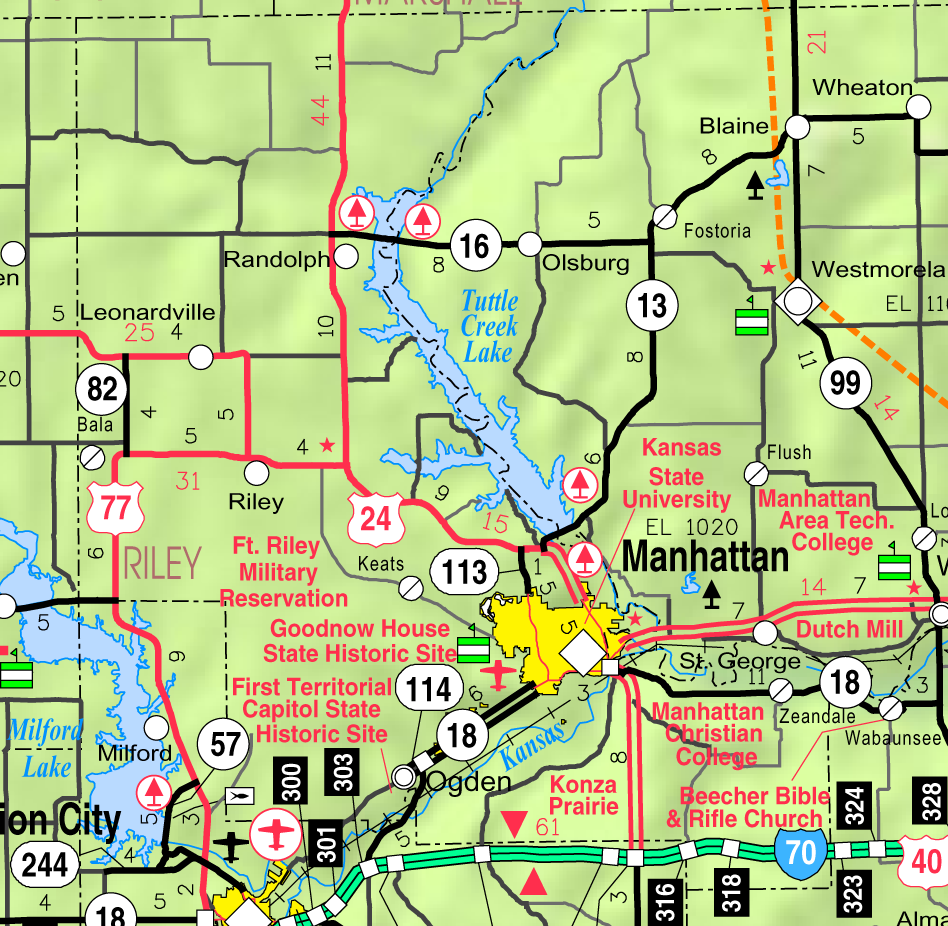
- KDOT map of Riley County (legend)
- Coordinates: 39°25′46″N 96°45′34″W
- Country: United States
- State: Kansas
- County: Riley
- Township: Jackson
- Founded: 1850s
- Platted: 1856
- Incorporated: 1886

Area
  - Total: 0.25 sq mi (0.65 km^{2})
  - Land: 0.25 sq mi (0.65 km^{2})
  - Water: 0 sq mi (0.00 km^{2})
- Elevation: 1,253 ft (382 m)

Population (2020)
  - Total: 159
  - Density: 630/sq mi (240/km^{2})
- Time zone: UTC-6 (CST)
  - Summer (DST): UTC-5 (CDT)
- ZIP Code: 66554
- Area code: 785
- FIPS code: 20-58475
- GNIS ID: 2396318
- Website: randolphks.com

Randolph is a city in Riley County, Kansas, United States. As of the 2020 census, the population of the city was 159.

== History ==
Randolph was originally called Waterville, and under the latter name was laid out in 1856. It was renamed Randolph in honor Gardner Randolph, a pioneer settler.

Randolph was originally located a mile east of its present location. When the Tuttle Creek reservoir began filling up in 1962, it affected ten towns and entirely submerged four of them (from north to south): Cleburne at 39°31′49″N 96°38′6″W, Randolph, Garrison Cross and Stockdale. The only town to rebuild elsewhere was Randolph, where the streets are named after the submerged towns.

The ruins of the original town are visible from Kansas Highway 16, to the north, as it crosses the lake. The downtown of the original settlement is above the waterline on an island in the marshes at the northern tip of the lake. The island is occasionally accessible by foot when Fancy Creek is low, but the channels of Fancy Creek and the Big Blue River shift frequently making access to the ruins unpredictable. This is locally known as "Old Randolph."

== Geography ==
According to the United States Census Bureau, the city has a total area of 0.25 square miles (0.65 km^{2}), all land.

=== Climate ===
The climate in this area is characterized by hot, humid summers and generally mild to cool winters. According to the Köppen Climate Classification system, Randolph has a humid subtropical climate, abbreviated "Cfa" on climate maps.

== Demographics ==
Historical population
Census	Pop.	Note	%±
1880	262		—
1890	305		16.4%
1900	372		22.0%
1910	455		22.3%
1920	401		−11.9%
1930	408		1.7%
1940	369		−9.6%
1950	391		6.0%
1960	35		−91.0%
1970	106		202.9%
1980	131		23.6%
1990	129		−1.5%
2000	175		35.7%
2010	163		−6.9%
2020	159		−2.5%
U.S. Decennial Census

Randolph is part of the Manhattan, Kansas Metropolitan Statistical Area.

=== 2020 census ===
The 2020 United States census counted 159 people, 64 households, and 45 families in Randolph. The population density was 633.5 per square mile (244.6/km^{2}). There were 78 housing units at an average density of 310.8 per square mile (120.0/km^{2}). The racial makeup was 88.05% (140) white or European American (88.05% non-Hispanic white), 3.77% (6) black or African-American, 0.0% (0) Native American or Alaska Native, 0.0% (0) Asian, 0.0% (0) Pacific Islander or Native Hawaiian, 2.52% (4) from other races, and 5.66% (9) from two or more races. Hispanic or Latino of any race was 5.03% (8) of the population.

Of the 64 households, 26.6% had children under the age of 18; 54.7% were married couples living together; 26.6% had a female householder with no spouse or partner present. 28.1% of households consisted of individuals and 12.5% had someone living alone who was 65 years of age or older. The average household size was 2.5 and the average family size was 3.0. The percent of those with a bachelor's degree or higher was estimated to be 14.5% of the population.

21.4% of the population was under the age of 18, 3.8% from 18 to 24, 27.7% from 25 to 44, 25.2% from 45 to 64, and 22.0% who were 65 years of age or older. The median age was 40.3 years. For every 100 females, there were 112.0 males. For every 100 females ages 18 and older, there were 111.9 males.

The 2016–2020 5-year American Community Survey estimates show that the median household income was $62,321 (with a margin of error of +/- $11,161) and the median family income was $67,500 (+/- $22,955). Females had a median income of $25,000 (+/- $7,344). The median income for those above 16 years old was $25,521 (+/- $9,023). Approximately, 0.0% of families and 2.4% of the population were below the poverty line, including 0.0% of those under the age of 18 and 0.0% of those ages 65 or over.

=== 2010 census ===
As of the census of 2010, there were 163 people, 71 households, and 43 families residing in the city. The population density was 652.0 inhabitants per square mile (251.7/km^{2}). There were 82 housing units at an average density of 328.0 per square mile (126.6/km^{2}). The racial makeup of the city was 96.9% White and 3.1% from two or more races. Hispanic or Latino of any race were 4.9% of the population.

There were 71 households, of which 31.0% had children under the age of 18 living with them, 50.7% were married couples living together, 7.0% had a female householder with no husband present, 2.8% had a male householder with no wife present, and 39.4% were non-families. 33.8% of all households were made up of individuals, and 14.1% had someone living alone who was 65 years of age or older. The average household size was 2.30 and the average family size was 3.00.

The median age in the city was 36.5 years. 25.2% of residents were under the age of 18; 5.5% were between the ages of 18 and 24; 28.2% were from 25 to 44; 28.8% were from 45 to 64; and 12.3% were 65 years of age or older. The gender makeup of the city was 44.2% male and 55.8% female.

=== 2000 census ===
As of the census of 2000, there were 175 people, 77 households, and 41 families residing in the city. The population density was 700.2 inhabitants per square mile (270.3/km^{2}). There were 83 housing units at an average density of 332.1 per square mile (128.2/km^{2}). The racial makeup of the city was 97.14% White, 0.57% Native American, and 2.29% from two or more races. Hispanic or Latino of any race were 0.57% of the population.

There were 77 households, out of which 26.0% had children under the age of 18 living with them, 45.5% were married couples living together, 6.5% had a female householder with no husband present, and 45.5% were non-families. 41.6% of all households were made up of individuals, and 20.8% had someone living alone who was 65 years of age or older. The average household size was 2.27 and the average family size was 3.24.

In the city, the population was spread out, with 25.7% under the age of 18, 5.7% from 18 to 24, 27.4% from 25 to 44, 21.1% from 45 to 64, and 20.0% who were 65 years of age or older. The median age was 40 years. For every 100 females, there were 101.1 males. For every 100 females age 18 and over, there were 109.7 males.

The median income for a household in the city was $21,875, and the median income for a family was $50,313. Males had a median income of $21,563 versus $21,458 for females. The per capita income for the city was $13,666. About 9.3% of families and 9.3% of the population were below the poverty line, including 3.7% of those under the age of eighteen and 20.7% of those 65 or over.

== Education ==
The community is served by Blue Valley USD 384 public school district.

== Notable people ==
- Cassandra Peterson, actress who played Elvira, Mistress of the Dark on TV and film

== See also ==
- Tuttle Creek Lake
