= Belvue, Kansas =

City in Pottawatomie County, Kansas

- City
- Location within Pottawatomie County and Kansas

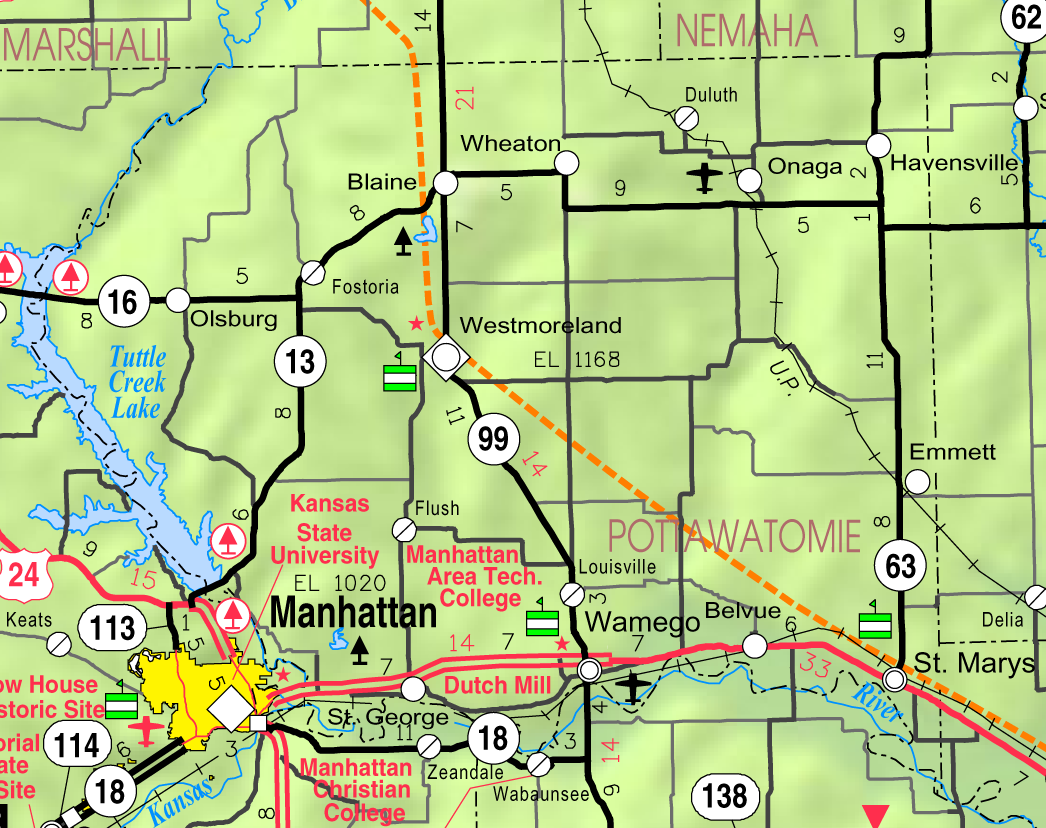
- KDOT map of Pottawatomie County (legend)
- Coordinates: 39°12′59″N 96°10′44″W
- Country: United States
- State: Kansas
- County: Pottawatomie
- Platted: 1871
- Incorporated: 1913

Area
  - Total: 0.12 sq mi (0.32 km^{2})
  - Land: 0.12 sq mi (0.32 km^{2})
  - Water: 0 sq mi (0.00 km^{2})
- Elevation: 961 ft (293 m)

Population (2020)
  - Total: 177
  - Density: 1,400/sq mi (550/km^{2})
- Time zone: UTC-6 (CST)
  - Summer (DST): UTC-5 (CDT)
- ZIP Code: 66407
- Area code: 785
- FIPS code: 20-05925
- GNIS ID: 2394129
- Website: City website

Belvue is a city in Pottawatomie County, Kansas, United States. As of the 2020 census, the population of the city was 177.

== History ==
Belvue was laid out in 1871. The first post office in Belvue was established in May 1871.

== Geography ==
According to the United States Census Bureau, the city has a total area of 0.12 square miles (0.31 km^{2}), all land.

== Demographics ==
Historical population
Census	Pop.	Note	%±
1920	199		—
1930	186		−6.5%
1940	226		21.5%
1950	193		−14.6%
1960	179		−7.3%
1970	161		−10.1%
1980	212		31.7%
1990	207		−2.4%
2000	228		10.1%
2010	205		−10.1%
2020	177		−13.7%
U.S. Decennial Census

Belvue is part of the Manhattan, Kansas Metropolitan Statistical Area.

=== 2020 census ===
The 2020 United States census counted 177 people, 61 households, and 46 families in Belvue. The population density was 1,439.0 per square mile (555.6/km^{2}). There were 69 housing units at an average density of 561.0 per square mile (216.6/km^{2}). The racial makeup was 85.31% (151) white or European American (82.49% non-Hispanic white), 0.0% (0) black or African-American, 0.0% (0) Native American or Alaska Native, 0.56% (1) Asian, 0.0% (0) Pacific Islander or Native Hawaiian, 2.26% (4) from other races, and 11.86% (21) from two or more races. Hispanic or Latino of any race was 11.86% (21) of the population.

Of the 61 households, 42.6% had children under the age of 18; 54.1% were married couples living together; 21.3% had a female householder with no spouse or partner present. 18.0% of households consisted of individuals and 8.2% had someone living alone who was 65 years of age or older. The average household size was 2.9 and the average family size was 3.5. The percent of those with a bachelor's degree or higher was estimated to be 4.0% of the population.

33.3% of the population was under the age of 18, 6.8% from 18 to 24, 35.0% from 25 to 44, 9.0% from 45 to 64, and 15.8% who were 65 years of age or older. The median age was 31.6 years. For every 100 females, there were 92.4 males. For every 100 females ages 18 and older, there were 96.7 males.

The 2016–2020 5-year American Community Survey estimates show that the median household income was $58,125 (with a margin of error of +/- $24,022) and the median family income was $74,375 (+/- $12,823). Males had a median income of $38,125 (+/- $22,822) versus $16,406 (+/- $1,821) for females. The median income for those above 16 years old was $27,500 (+/- $21,001). Approximately, 16.1% of families and 11.3% of the population were below the poverty line, including 10.3% of those under the age of 18 and 9.1% of those ages 65 or over.

=== 2010 census ===
As of the census of 2010, there were 205 people, 68 households, and 53 families residing in the city. The population density was 1,708.3 inhabitants per square mile (659.6/km^{2}). There were 80 housing units at an average density of 666.7 per square mile (257.4/km^{2}). The racial makeup of the city was 97.6% White and 2.4% from two or more races. Hispanic or Latino of any race were 6.8% of the population.

There were 68 households, of which 36.8% had children under the age of 18 living with them, 58.8% were married couples living together, 13.2% had a female householder with no husband present, 5.9% had a male householder with no wife present, and 22.1% were non-families. 17.6% of all households were made up of individuals, and 14.7% had someone living alone who was 65 years of age or older. The average household size was 3.01 and the average family size was 3.49.

The median age in the city was 30.5 years. 33.7% of residents were under the age of 18; 9.2% were between the ages of 18 and 24; 21.5% were from 25 to 44; 25.3% were from 45 to 64; and 10.2% were 65 years of age or older. The gender makeup of the city was 47.8% male and 52.2% female.

=== 2000 census ===
As of the census of 2000, there were 228 people, 75 households, and 54 families residing in the city. The population density was 2,021.8 inhabitants per square mile (780.6/km^{2}). There were 82 housing units at an average density of 727.1 per square mile (280.7/km^{2}). The racial makeup of the city was 98.68% White, 0.44% Native American, and 0.88% from two or more races.

There were 75 households, out of which 37.3% had children under the age of 18 living with them, 65.3% were married couples living together, 4.0% had a female householder with no husband present, and 28.0% were non-families. 26.7% of all households were made up of individuals, and 13.3% had someone living alone who was 65 years of age or older. The average household size was 3.04 and the average family size was 3.69.

In the city, the population was spread out, with 36.4% under the age of 18, 9.2% from 18 to 24, 26.8% from 25 to 44, 13.2% from 45 to 64, and 14.5% who were 65 years of age or older. The median age was 29 years. For every 100 females, there were 100.0 males. For every 100 females age 18 and over, there were 123.1 males.

The median income for a household in the city was $35,625, and the median income for a family was $34,500. Males had a median income of $27,222 versus $22,813 for females. The per capita income for the city was $12,200. About 10.7% of families and 20.7% of the population were below the poverty line, including 38.3% of those under the age of eighteen and none of those 65 or over.

== Education ==
The community is served by Wamego USD 320 public school district.
