= Olsburg, Kansas =

City in Pottawatomie County, Kansas

- City
- Location within Pottawatomie County and Kansas

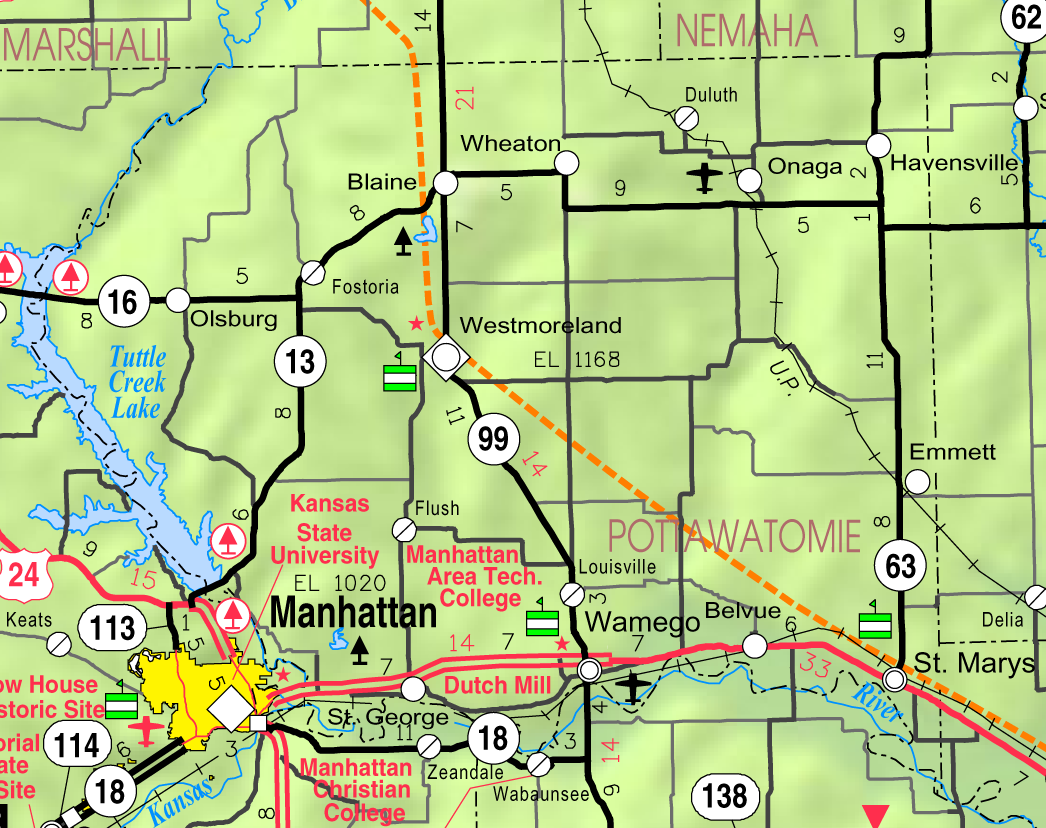
- KDOT map of Pottawatomie County (legend)
- Coordinates: 39°25′55″N 96°36′57″W
- Country: United States
- State: Kansas
- County: Pottawatomie
- Founded: late 1870s
- Incorporated: 1926
- Named for: Ole Thrulson

Area
  - Total: 0.19 sq mi (0.48 km^{2})
  - Land: 0.19 sq mi (0.48 km^{2})
  - Water: 0 sq mi (0.00 km^{2})
- Elevation: 1,427 ft (435 m)

Population (2020)
  - Total: 218
  - Density: 1,200/sq mi (450/km^{2})
- Time zone: UTC-6 (CST)
  - Summer (DST): UTC-5 (CDT)
- ZIP Code: 66520
- Area code: 785
- FIPS code: 20-52825
- GNIS ID: 2396062
- Website: olsburgks.com

Olsburg is a city in Pottawatomie County, Kansas, United States. As of the 2020 census, the population of the city was 218.

== History ==
Olsburg was laid out in the late 1870s. It was originally built up chiefly by Swedes. Olsburg was named for Ole Thrulson, a pioneer settler.

The first post office in Olsburg was founded in 1873, but the name of the post office was spelled Olesburgh until 1887.

== Geography ==
According to the United States Census Bureau, the city has a total area of 0.19 square miles (0.49 km^{2}), all land.

== Demographics ==
Historical population
Census	Pop.	Note	%±
1890	185		—
1930	175		—
1940	177		1.1%
1950	140		−20.9%
1960	137		−2.1%
1970	151		10.2%
1980	166		9.9%
1990	192		15.7%
2000	192		0.0%
2010	219		14.1%
2020	218		−0.5%
U.S. Decennial Census

Olsburg is part of the Manhattan, Kansas Metropolitan Statistical Area.

=== 2020 census ===
The 2020 United States census counted 218 people, 85 households, and 64 families in Olsburg. The population density was 900.8 per square mile (347.8/km^{2}). There were 98 housing units at an average density of 405.0 per square mile (156.4/km^{2}). The racial makeup was 94.5% (206) white or European American (93.58% non-Hispanic white), 0.0% (0) black or African-American, 0.0% (0) Native American or Alaska Native, 0.0% (0) Asian, 0.0% (0) Pacific Islander or Native Hawaiian, 1.38% (3) from other races, and 4.13% (9) from two or more races. Hispanic or Latino of any race was 1.38% (3) of the population.

Of the 85 households, 28.2% had children under the age of 18; 65.9% were married couples living together; 16.5% had a female householder with no spouse or partner present. 21.2% of households consisted of individuals and 10.6% had someone living alone who was 65 years of age or older. The average household size was 2.8 and the average family size was 3.1. The percent of those with a bachelor's degree or higher was estimated to be 18.3% of the population.

28.0% of the population was under the age of 18, 1.8% from 18 to 24, 29.8% from 25 to 44, 26.1% from 45 to 64, and 14.2% who were 65 years of age or older. The median age was 39.0 years. For every 100 females, there were 101.9 males. For every 100 females ages 18 and older, there were 112.2 males.

The 2016–2020 5-year American Community Survey estimates show that the median household income was $66,500 (with a margin of error of +/- $14,827) and the median family income was $75,000 (+/- $16,565). Males had a median income of $38,125 (+/- $15,457) versus $40,156 (+/- $13,522) for females. The median income for those above 16 years old was $39,375 (+/- $12,069). Approximately, 3.6% of families and 5.1% of the population were below the poverty line, including 8.9% of those under the age of 18 and 0.0% of those ages 65 or over.

=== 2010 census ===
As of the census of 2010, there were 219 people, 85 households, and 58 families residing in the city. The population density was 1,152.6 inhabitants per square mile (445.0/km^{2}). There were 98 housing units at an average density of 515.8 per square mile (199.2/km^{2}). The racial makeup of the city was 97.7% White and 2.3% from two or more races. Hispanic or Latino of any race were 2.7% of the population.

There were 85 households, of which 36.5% had children under the age of 18 living with them, 57.6% were married couples living together, 7.1% had a female householder with no husband present, 3.5% had a male householder with no wife present, and 31.8% were non-families. 27.1% of all households were made up of individuals, and 9.5% had someone living alone who was 65 years of age or older. The average household size was 2.58 and the average family size was 3.17.

The median age in the city was 33.2 years. 33.8% of residents were under the age of 18; 3.7% were between the ages of 18 and 24; 26% were from 25 to 44; 25.6% were from 45 to 64; and 11% were 65 years of age or older. The gender makeup of the city was 48.9% male and 51.1% female.

=== 2000 census ===
As of the census of 2000, there were 192 people, 80 households, and 63 families residing in the city. The population density was 1,282.7 inhabitants per square mile (495.3/km^{2}). There were 85 housing units at an average density of 567.9 per square mile (219.3/km^{2}). The racial makeup of the city was 99.48% White and 0.52% Native American.

There were 80 households, out of which 26.3% had children under the age of 18 living with them, 68.8% were married couples living together, 7.5% had a female householder with no husband present, and 21.3% were non-families. 18.8% of all households were made up of individuals, and 5.0% had someone living alone who was 65 years of age or older. The average household size was 2.40 and the average family size was 2.75.

In the city, the population was spread out, with 21.4% under the age of 18, 9.9% from 18 to 24, 24.5% from 25 to 44, 17.7% from 45 to 64, and 26.6% who were 65 years of age or older. The median age was 42 years. For every 100 females, there were 100.0 males. For every 100 females age 18 and over, there were 104.1 males.

The median income for a household in the city was $37,969, and the median income for a family was $39,531. Males had a median income of $27,386 versus $23,281 for females. The per capita income for the city was $14,268. 5.0% of the population and 7.2% of families were below the poverty line. Out of the total population, none of those under the age of 18 and 19.1% of those 65 and older were living below the poverty line.

== Education ==
The community is served by Blue Valley USD 384 public school district.

== See also ==
- Tuttle Creek Lake and Tuttle Creek State Park
