= Deaths in September 1987 =

The following is a list of notable deaths in September 1987.

Entries for each day are listed alphabetically by surname. A typical entry lists information in the following sequence:

- Name, age, country of citizenship at birth, subsequent country of citizenship (if applicable), reason for notability, cause of death (if known), and reference.

== September 1987 ==
=== 1 ===
- Ralph Cobbold, 81, English cricketer.
- Dennis Coi, 26, Canadian figure skater, AIDS.
- Gerhard Fieseler, 91, German World War I flying ace, aerobatics champion and aircraft designer and manufacturer.
- Philip Friend, 72, British film and television actor (The Highwayman).
- Arnaldo Momigliano, 78, Italian historian of classical antiquity.
- Alan Reid, 72, Australian political journalist, cancer.
- Pinky Whitney, 82, American Major League baseball player (Philadelphia Phillies).

=== 2 ===
- Leon Blevins, 61, American basketball player and coach.
- Cam Carreon, 50, American Major League baseball player (Chicago White Sox).
- Brian Clay, 52, Australian rugby league footballer (St. George Dragons, Australia), heart disease.
- LeGrande A. Diller, American general in the U.S. Army, cancer.
- Ken Flower, 73, English-born Rhodesian police officer and intelligence chief, heart attack.
- Thomas Hambrook, 65, New Zealand cricketer.
- Remzi Aydın Jöntürk, 50, Turkish actor and screenwriter (Yarınsız Adam, Yıkılmayan Adam), traffic accident.
- Ramesh Naidu, 53, Indian composer, instrumentalist and singer.
- Alfredo Oscar Saint Jean, 60, Argentine Army division general and politician, de facto President of Argentina.
- Stephen B. Small, 40, American businessman, kidnapped and held for ransom, asphyxiation during captivity.

=== 3 ===
- Tom Amrhein, 76, American soccer player.
- Diana Caldwell, 73, English woman, best known for her part in the murder of Lord Erroll.
- Carter W. Clarke, 90. American intelligence officer in the U.S. Army, heart attack.
- Doug Cooper, 48, American NASCAR driver.
- Ned Day, 42, American journalist and newspaper reporter, heart attack.
- Morton Feldman, 61, American composer, pancreatic cancer.
- Gordon Fletcher, 79, Australian rugby league footballer.
- Maxwell Fry, 88, English architect and writer.
- Doris Gates, 85, American writer of children's fiction (Blue Willow), heart attack.
- Georges Gourdy, 81, French Olympic boxer (1924).
- Drago Husjak, 61, Yugoslavian Olympic rower (1952).
- Merlin Minshall, 80, British naval officer and adventurer.
- Aleksandr Nadiradze, 73, Georgian engineer, involved in militarising the Soviet space program.
- Viktor Nekrasov, 76, Soviet writer, journalist and editor, cancer.
- Lee Theodore, 54, American Broadway theatre director and performer.
- Rusty Wescoatt, 76, American supporting actor.

=== 4 ===
- Bill Bowes, 79, English test cricketer, player in the Bodyline series, heart attack.
- George M. Chinn, 85, American weapons expert and soldier.
- Richard Marquand, 49, Welsh film and television director (Return of the Jedi), stroke.
- Norm McDermott, 74, Australian rules footballer.
- Harry Oliver White, 92, Canadian politician, member of the Canada House of Commons (1945–1962).

=== 5 ===
- Richard D. Adams, 78, American rear admiral in the U.S. Navy.
- Takeo Akuta, 83, Japanese baseball player and manager.
- Wolfgang Fortner, 79, German composer and conductor.
- Floyd Iglehart, 53, American NFL player (Los Angeles Rams).
- Scott Irwin, 35, American professional wrestler, brain tumour.
- Salvador Lutteroth, 90, Mexican professional wrestling promoter.
- Quinn Martin, 65, American television producer (The Fugitive), heart attack.

=== 6 ===
- Jack d'Avigdor-Goldsmid, 74, British Army general and politician, Member of Parliament.
- Arun Kumar Choudhury, 64, Indian head of Department of Computer Science and Engineering at University of Calcutta.
- William Haley, 86, British newspaper editor and Director-General of the BBC.
- Paul Hiebert, 95, Canadian writer and humorist (Sarah Binks).
- Arthur Smith, 79, Australian rules footballer.

=== 7 ===
- Mario Beltrami, 85, Italian painter.
- Gordon Gollob, 75, Austrian fighter pilot during World War II, fighter ace.
- Harry Locke, 73, English actor.

=== 8 ===
- Robert Sharples, 74, British musical conductor, composer and bandleader.
- Margaret Mary Smith, 70, South African ichthyologist.
- Frank Thornton, 88, English cricketer.
- Jiří Zavřel, 76, Czech Olympic rower (1936).

=== 9 ===
- Sam Brody, 80, English-founding member of the Workers Film and Photo League, injuries from a fall.
- Norman Lethbridge Cowper, 90, Australian lawyer.
- Tom Davis, 76, Irish international footballer (New Brighton, Oldham Athletic, Ireland).
- Bill Fraser, 79, Scottish actor (When We Are Married), emphysema.
- Gunnar de Frumerie, 79, Swedish composer and pianist.
- Gerrit Jan Heijn, 56, Dutch businessman, murdered after abduction.
- Vratislav Mazák, 50, Czech biologist specialising in paleoanthropology.
- Al Read, 78, British radio comedian, stroke.
- Dora Zaslavsky, 83, Russian-born American pianist.

=== 10 ===
- Wallace Allen, 66, Irish cricketer.
- Benjamin Howard Baker, 95, English international footballer (Corinthian), high jumper and triple jumper, dual Olympian.
- Werner de Spoelberch, 85, Belgian Olympic alpine skier (1936).

=== 11 ===
- Kerstin Bernadotte, 76, Swedish journalist and magazine editor.
- Hugh David, 62, British actor and television director (Doctor Who).
- Charles Fleming, 71, New Zealand geologist and ornithologist.
- Ivylyn Girardeau, 86, American doctor and missionary.
- Lorne Greene, 72, Canadian actor (Bonanza, Battlestar Galactica), pneumonia.
- Harry Gale Nye Jr., 79, American entrepreneur and world champion sailor.
- Harry Peace, 74, Canadian Olympic wrestler (1948).
- William Pearson, 74, Australian cricketer.
- Hervey Rhodes, 92, British politician, Member of Parliament.
- Sandilyan, 76, Indian writer.
- Manikuntala Sen, 75–76, member of the Communist Party of India.
- Nareshchandra Singh, 78, Indian ruler of Sarangarh State.
- Surendra, 76, Indian singer and actor.
- Peter Tosh, 42, Jamaican reggae singer and musician, murdered in home invasion.
- Mahadevi Varma, 80, Indian poet and writer.
- John Lloyd Waddy, 70, Australian officer in the Royal Australian Air Force and politician (New South Wales).
- Frank Wiziarde, 71, American actor and television personality.

=== 12 ===
- J. Lawton Collins, 91, American army general, Chief of Staff of the United States Army, cardiac arrest.
- William Dickson, 88, British Royal Naval Air Service aviator, Chief of the Defence Staff.
- Merv Leith, 65, Australian rules footballer.
- John Qualen, 87, Canadian-born American actor, heart failure.
- Väinö Sipilä, 89, Finnish Olympic long-distance runner (1924, 1928).
- John J. Voll, 65, American officer in the U.S. Air Force, World War II flying ace.

=== 13 ===
- Aníbal Gordon, Argentinian suspected of being a leader of the Triple A death squad, lung cancer.
- John Green, 79, English cricketer.
- Mervyn LeRoy, 86, American film director and actor (The Wizard of Oz), heart issues.
- Charlie Parks, 70, American baseball player.

=== 14 ===
- Octave Dayen, 81, French Olympic cyclist (1928).
- Julien Kialunda, 47, Congolese international footballer (Anderlecht, Zaire), AIDS.
- Erik Lundberg, 80, Swedish economist.
- Stormont Mancroft, 73, British politician, member of the House of Lords.
- Arthur W. Vanaman, 95, American general in the U.S. Air Corps and Air Force.
- Henry Wrigley, 95, Australian Air Vice Marshal in the Royal Australian Air Force.

=== 15 ===
- David Akui, 67, American soldier, captured first Japanese prisoner of war in World War II.
- Wilhelm Berlin, 98, Nazi German general, Knight's Cross of the Iron Cross recipient.
- Yevgeniya Bogdanovskaya, 69, Soviet Olympic diver (1952).
- Leon Hirszman, 49, Brazilian film director and screenwriter (They Don't Wear Black Tie), AIDS.
- Harry Holcombe, 80, American actor and radio director (Bonanza).
- David Janes, 43, English cricketer.
- Moazzam Jah, 79, Indian royal, son of the last Nizam of Hyderabad.
- Jimmy Johnson, 68, American baseball player.
- Harry Malcolm, 81, American NFL player.
- Nilo Menéndez, 84, Cuban-born American songwriter ("Aquellos Ojos Verdes").
- George Edward Pendray, 86, American author, founder of the American Interplanetary Society.
- Joe Reisman, 62, American musician, bandleader and record producer, heart attack.

=== 16 ===
- Nils Björklöf, 66, Finnish Olympic spirit canoeist (1948).
- William Richard Joseph Cook, 82, British mathematician, leader in development of hydrogen bomb, stroke.
- Simon Gipps-Kent, 28, English theatre and film actor, morphine poisoning.
- Howard Moss, 65, American poet and dramatist, heart attack.
- Christopher Soames, 66, British politician, Member of Parliament, Governor of Southern Rhodesia, pancreatitis.
- Kermit Wahl, 64, American MLB player.

=== 17 ===
- K. Jack Bauer, 61, American writer and naval historian, co-founder of North American Society for Oceanic History, heart attack.
- Vladimir Basov, 64, Soviet actor, film director and screenwriter, stroke.
- Francis E. Dorn, 76, American politician, member of U.S. House of Representatives (1953–1961), cancer.
- George Dwyer, 78, English Roman Catholic prelate, archbishop of Birmingham.
- François Eisenbarth, 59, Luxembourgian Olympic gymnast (1960).
- Musa Gareyev, 65, Soviet Air Force squadron leader, cancer.
- Carol Henry, 69, American actor.
- Henry Kroeger, 70, Russian-born Canadian politician, member of Legislative Assembly of Alberta, lymphoma and pneumonia.
- Philip Wayne Powell, 73–74, American historian of the American Southwest and Spanish colonialism, heart attack.
- Dieter Schidor, 39, German actor (Cross of Iron, Querelle), AIDS.

=== 18 ===
- Golbery do Couto e Silva, 76, Brazilian army general and politician, Chief of Staff of the Presidency.
- Frederic Fitch, 79, American logician, professor at Yale University.
- William Gemmill, 87, Welsh cricketer.
- Richard Greenwood, 82, Australian rules footballer.
- Olinka Hrdy, 85, American artist.
- Emil Schram, 93, American president of the New York Stock Exchange.
- Américo Tomás, 92, Portuguese Navy officer and politician, President of Portugal, infection.

=== 19 ===
- Lean Alejandro, 27, Filipino student leader and political activist, assassinated.
- Betty Burbridge, 91, American screenwriter and actress.
- Einar Gerhardsen, 90, Norwegian politician, Prime Minister of Norway.
- Nyamyn Jagvaral, 68, Mongolian politician, Chairman of the Presidium of the People's Great Khural.
- Muhammad Mansuruddin, 83, Bangladeshi author, literary critic and essayist.
- Graciela Olivarez, 59, American lawyer, advocate for civil rights and for the poor.
- Ralph Steinhauer, 82, Canadian politician, Lieutenant Governor of Alberta.
- Ken Uston, 52, American blackjack player, heart failure.

=== 20 ===
- Peter Allan, 52, Australian rules footballer.
- Joshua Croft, 87, Australian rules footballer.
- George William Goddard, 98, English-born American general in the U.S. Air Force.
- Veli-Jussi Hölsö, 68, Finnish Olympic sports shooter (1952).
- Greville Howard, 78, British politician, Member of Parliament.
- K. C. S. Mani, 65, Indian socialist activist, attempted to assassinate C. P. Ramaswamy Iyer.
- Michael Stewart, 63, American playwright, screenwriter and novelist, pneumonia.
- Péter Török, 36, Hungarian international footballer (Vasas, Hungary).

=== 21 ===
- Aimo Aaltonen, 81, Finnish politician, leader of Communist Party of Finland.
- Sven Andersson, 77, Swedish politician, Minister for Foreign Affairs.
- Ruth Attaway, 77, American film and stage actress, injuries from a fire.
- John Chandos, 70, Scottish film and television actor.
- William Kwai-sun Chow, 73, American martial artist.
- Bill Erickson, 59, American basketball player.
- Peter Kippax, 65, English Olympic footballer (1948).
- J. Clyde Morris, 78, American civic leader.
- Jaco Pastorius, 35, American jazz bassist and composer, brain hemorrhage after assault.
- Larry Stanley, 91, Irish Gaelic footballer and Olympic high jumper (1924).

=== 22 ===
- Willard I. Bowerman Jr., 70, American politician, member of the Michigan House of Representatives (1953–1960).
- Hákun Djurhuus, 78, Prime Minister of the Faroe Islands.
- H. R. Gross, 88, American politician, member of U.S. House of Representatives (1949–1975), Alzheimer's disease.
- Norman Luboff, 70, American music arranger and publisher, choir director, lung cancer.
- Carman Maxwell, 84, American animator and voice actor (Bosko).
- Dan Rowan, 65, American actor and comedian (Rowan & Martin's Laugh-In), lymphoma.
- Krešo Tretinjak, 82, Yugoslavian Olympic fencer (1936).
- James Roy Tucker, 77, Canadian politician, member of the Canada House of Commons (1958–1968).

=== 23 ===
- Walter M. Baumhofer, 82, American illustrator.
- Bob Fosse, 60, American dancer, choreographer and director, heart attack.
- Ernie Jessen, 82, American NFL player.
- Louis Kentner, 82, Hungarian and British pianist.
- Rajendra Krishan, 68, Indian poet, lyricist and screenwriter.
- Erland Van Lidth De Jeude, 34, Dutch-born American wrestler, opera singer and actor, heart failure.
- O. B. McClinton, 47, American country music singer and songwriter, abdominal cancer.

=== 24 ===
- Drew Bundini Brown, 59, American assistant trainer and cornerman of Muhammad Ali.
- John Nelson Cooper, 80, American custom knifemaker, founding member of the Knifemakers' Guild.
- Damiaen Joan van Doorninck, 85, Dutch officer, lieutenant commander in the Royal Netherlands Navy Reserve.
- Vic Harrison, 76, Australian rules footballer.
- Erhard Kroeger, 82, Nazi German SS officer, involved in resettlement of Baltic Germans before World War II.
- Dorothy Meyer, 62, American film and television actress.
- Victor Mollo, 78, British contract bridge player, journalist and author, heart attack.
- Emory M. Sneeden, 60, American district judge.
- Joseph Tabenkin, 66, Israeli military commander.
- A. R. Van Cleave, 97, American college football coach (Elon Phoenix).

=== 25 ===
- Mary Astor, 81, American actress (The Maltese Falcon), respiratory failure.
- Norman Barron, 88, Australian rules footballer.
- Gerald Chapman, 37, English theatre director, AIDS.
- Duffy Daugherty, 72, American college football player and coach, kidney failure.
- Hassan El-Hassani, 71, Algerian comedian.
- Harry Holtzman, 75, American artist and founding member of the American Abstract Artists, pancreatic cancer.
- Victoria Kent, 90, Spanish lawyer and republican politician, heart attack.
- Abba Kovner, 69, Lithuanian-born Israeli partisan leader, poet and writer, laryngeal cancer.
- Gennady Mikhasevich, 40, Soviet serial killer, executed.
- Emlyn Williams, 81, Welsh writer and actor (Night Must Fall), bowel cancer.

=== 26 ===
- Edgar Anstey, 80, British documentary filmmaker (Thirty Million Letters, Snow).
- Ernie Carless, 75, Welsh cricketer.
- Ethel Catherwood, 79, Canadian high jumper and javelin thrower, Olympic gold medalist.
- Bill Gilbert, 71, New Zealand intelligence service director.
- Co Prins, 49, Dutch international footballer (Ajax, Netherlands), heart attack.
- Andi Ramang, 63, Indonesian international footballer (Makassar, Indonesia).
- Howard W. Robison, 71, American politician, member of U.S. House of Representatives (1958–1975).
- Sergio Santander, 33, Chilean race car driver, racing crash.
- Ioan Soter, 60, Romanian Olympic high jumper (1952).
- Herbert Tichy, 75, Austrian writer and climber, made first ascent of Cho Oyu.

=== 27 ===
- John Newbold Camp, 79, American banker and politician, member of U.S. House of Representatives (1969–1975), heart attack.
- Ada Elizabeth Corder, 92, Australian music teacher and pianist.
- Michael Farebrother, 67, English cricketer.
- J. N. Findlay, 83, South African philosopher.
- Robert Benjamin Greenblatt, 80–81, Canadian endocrinologist.
- Maria Guardiola, 92, Portuguese politician, anti-feminist.
- Stan Lloyd, 75, Australian rules footballer.
- M. K. K. Nair, 66, Indian art connoisseur, officer of the Indian Administrative Service, cancer.
- Eddy de Wind, 71, Dutch Holocaust survivor, physician and psychoanalyst.

=== 28 ===
- Willard Harrison Bennett, 84, American plasma physicist.
- Roman Brandstaetter, 81, Polish writer, poet and playwright, heart attack.
- Mehdi Hashemi, 42–43, Iranian Shi'a cleric, senior official in the Islamic Revolutionary Guards, executed.
- Belle Linsky, 82–83, Ukrainian-born American businesswoman and philanthropist.
- Ray Madden, 95, American politician, member of U.S. House of Representatives (1943–1977), cardiac arrhythmia.
- William Skoreyko, 64, Canadian politician, member of the Canada House of Commons (1958–1979).
- Erich Wied, 64, German Olympic gymnast (1952, 1956).

=== 29 ===
- Christopher Boardman, 84, British Olympic sailor (1936).
- Darach Ó Catháin, 64, Irish sean-nós singer.
- Elizabeth Eden, 41, American trans woman, pneumonia.
- Henry Ford II, 70, American president of Ford Motor Company, pneumonia.
- Vinodini Nilkanth, 80, Indian Gujarati writer.
- Sebastian Peschko, 77, German classical pianist.
- Mario Prestifilippo, 28, Italian member of the Sicilian Mafia, suspected murderer, shot.
- Billy Stevens, 82, Australian rules footballer.

=== 30 ===
- Alfred Bester, 73, American science fiction author and scriptwriter (The Demolished Man), complications from broken hip.
- Geoffrey Bowers, 33, American attorney, AIDS.
- Geoffrey Burridge, 38, English theatre and television actor, AIDS.
- Forest Hays Jr., 59, American politician, member of the Georgia House of Representatives (1971–1987).
- Anja Lappalainen, 69, Finnish Olympic swimmer (1936).
- Herbert Sobel, 75, American soldier in World War II, his story featured in Band of Brothers, malnutrition.

=== Unknown date ===
- A. K. Brohi, 72, Pakistani politician and lawyer.
- Ephraim Hertzano, 74–75, Romanian-born Israeli board game designer, inventor of the game Rummikub.
- Alice Rahon, 83, French-born Mexican poet and artist.
