= Flush, Kansas =

Unincorporated community in Pottawatomie County, Kansas

- Unincorporated community
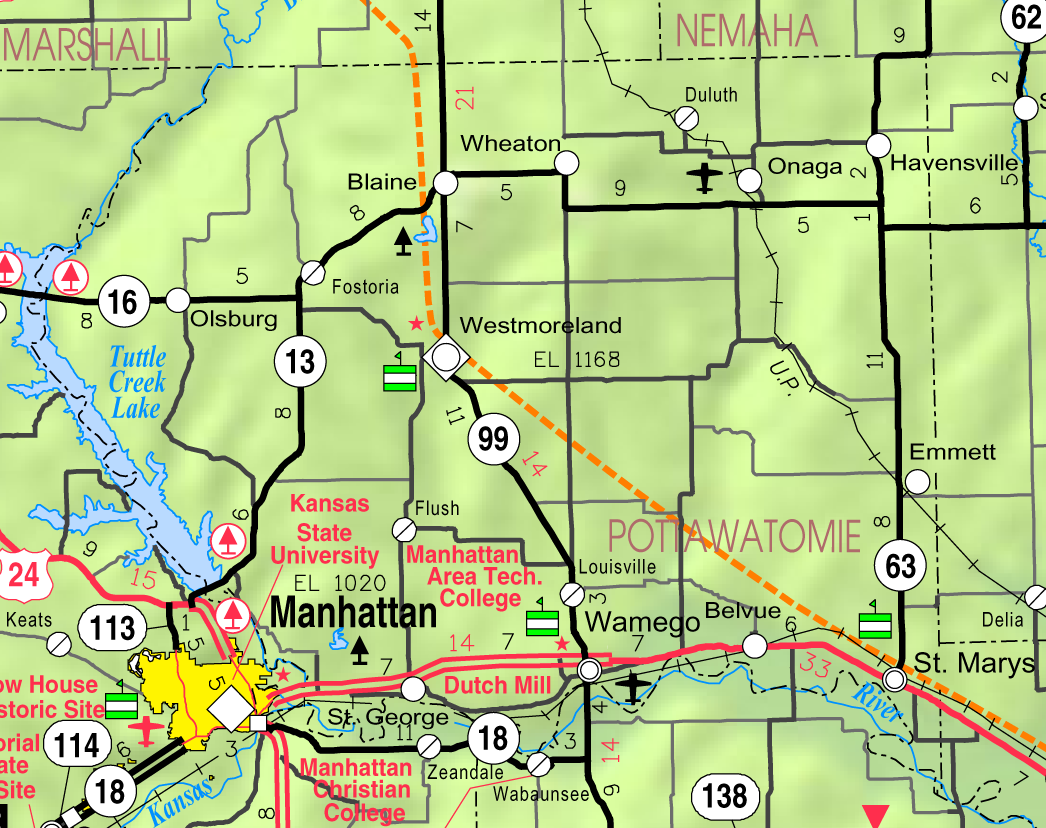
- KDOT map of Pottawatomie County (legend)

- Location within Kansas Location within the United States
- Coordinates: 39°17′40″N 96°26′26″W
- Country: United States
- State: Kansas
- County: Pottawatomie
- Elevation: 1,093 ft (333 m)
- Time zone: UTC-6 (CST)
  - Summer (DST): UTC-5 (CDT)
- Area code: 785
- FIPS code: 20-23625
- GNIS ID: 484769

Flush is an unincorporated community in Pottawatomie County, Kansas, United States. It is located between St George and Westmoreland.

== History ==
Flush derived its name from Michael Floersch, a pioneer settler. When the post office was opened in Flush in 1899, the postmaster-general could not pronounce Floersch and changed the name to Flush. Postal service was discontinued in 1927. The church and community were settled predominately with German-speaking immigrants. The church maintained German-speaking priests until 1927. The church also opened a parish school in the 1890s which ceased operation in 1976.

The town was poised for increased growth with the planned expansion of a railroad through Flush in 1908. The Floersch family even constructed a grain mill in Flush that was designed to serve the railroad. However, the railroad was never constructed and the town never saw the growth the immigrants in the region expected. Most of the residents at the townsite of Flush departed for other communities by 1914.

Today, all that remains of the community is the St. Joseph's Catholic Church campus, which includes a rectory, parish hall, and cemetery flanking both sides of Flush Road. The church building was built in 1901, and was last remodeled in 2001. Flush and the St. Joseph Church community are recognized around the region for the annual Flush Picnic, a fried chicken dinner fundraiser and fair that benefits the church community. The picnic draws crowds of more than 2,000 people to Flush and is typically held the last Wednesday in July every year.

== Education ==
The community is served by Rock Creek USD 323 public school district. The Rock Creek High School is located one mile north of Flush and was built in 1991.

The Catholic parochial school in Flush was closed in 1976. The Flush High School mascot was Flush Rockets.
