= Monument to the Victims of June 1956 =

Poznań June 1956 Monument
- Pomnik Poznańskiego Czerwca 1956
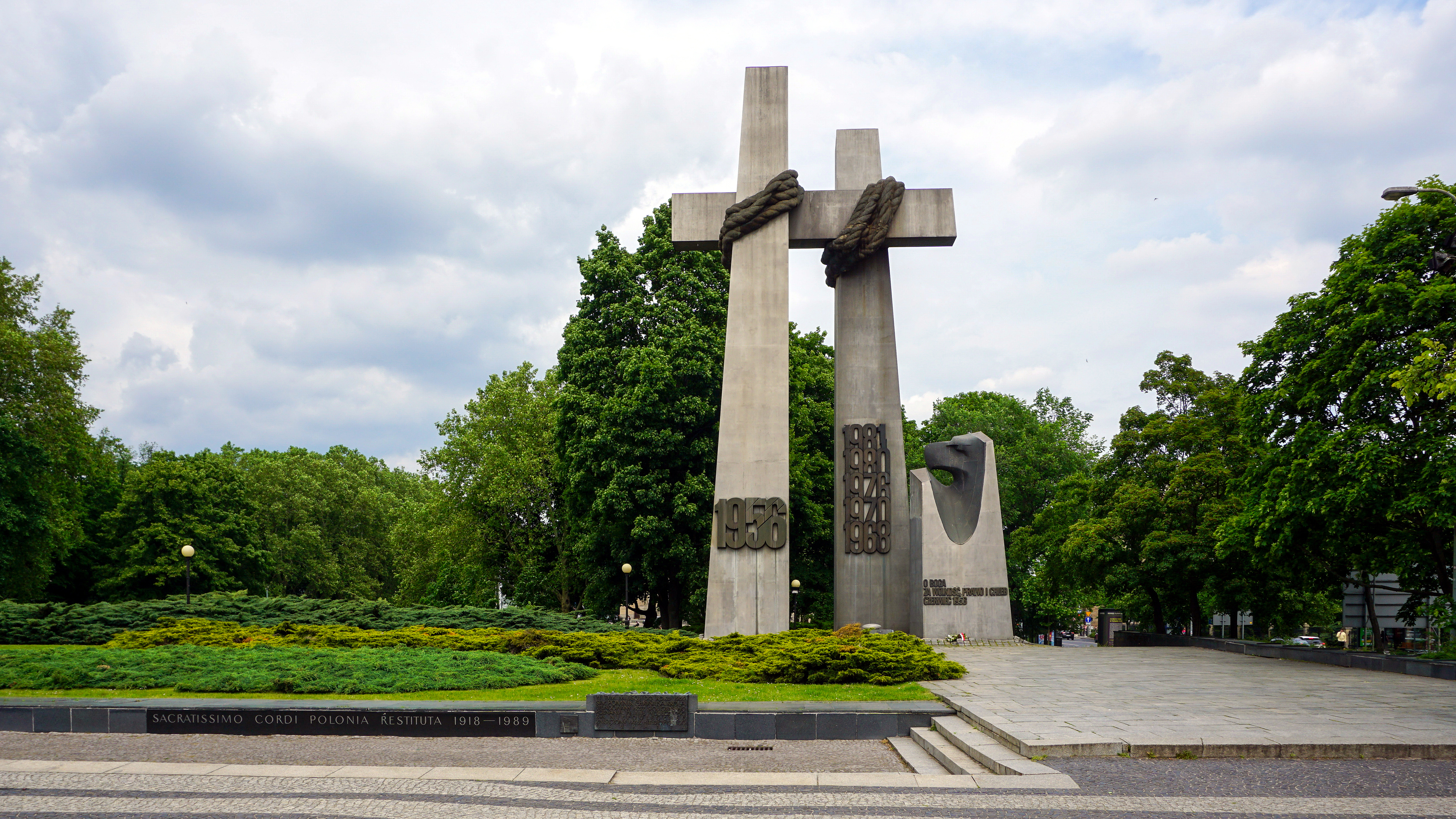
- Interactive map of Poznań June 1956 Monument
- Location: Poznań, Poland
- Designer: Sculptor Adam Graczyk, architect Włodzimierz Wojciechowski
- Height: 21 m
- Beginning date: June 19, 1981
- Opening date: June 28, 1981

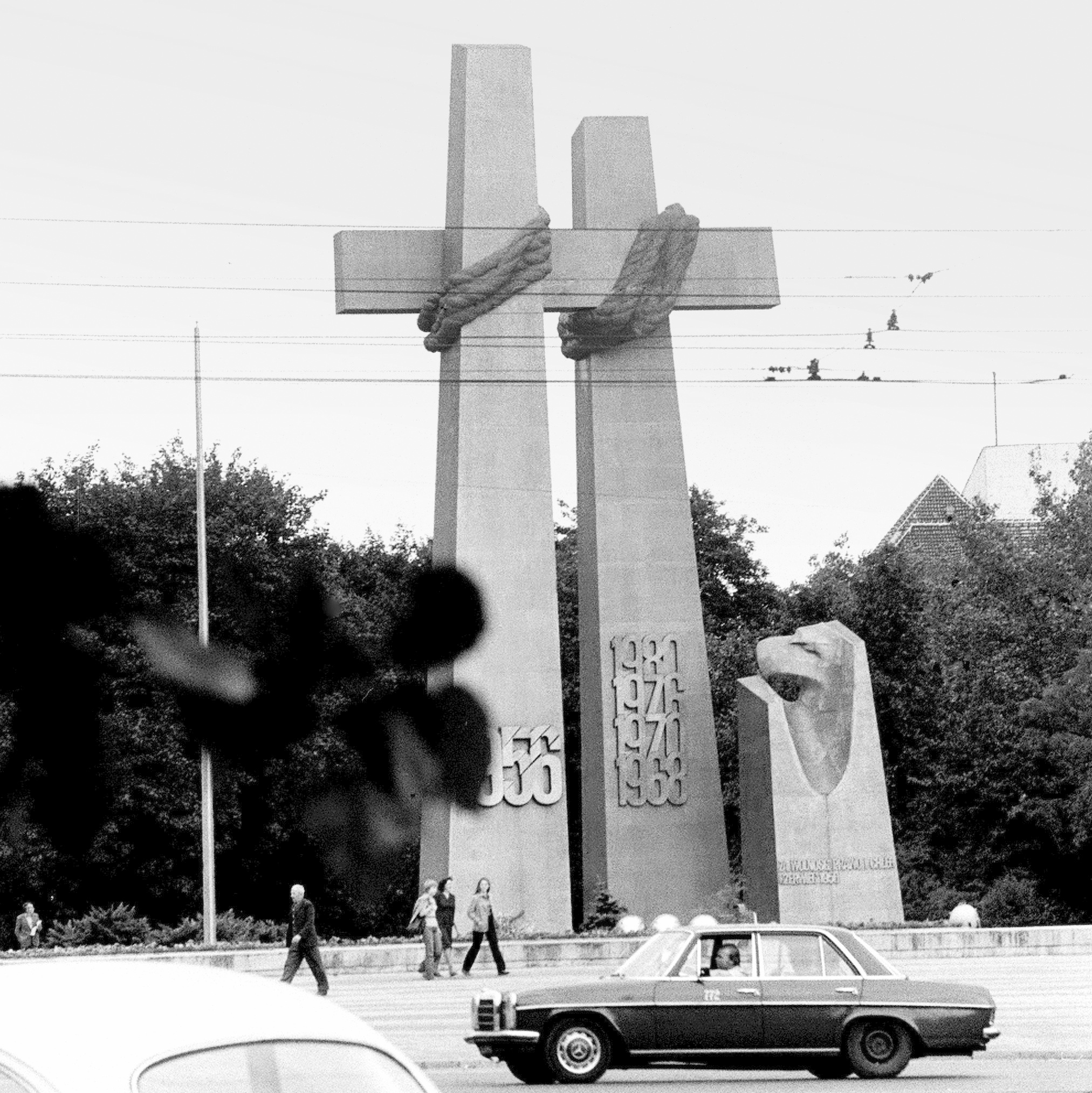
Poznań Crosses in 1981

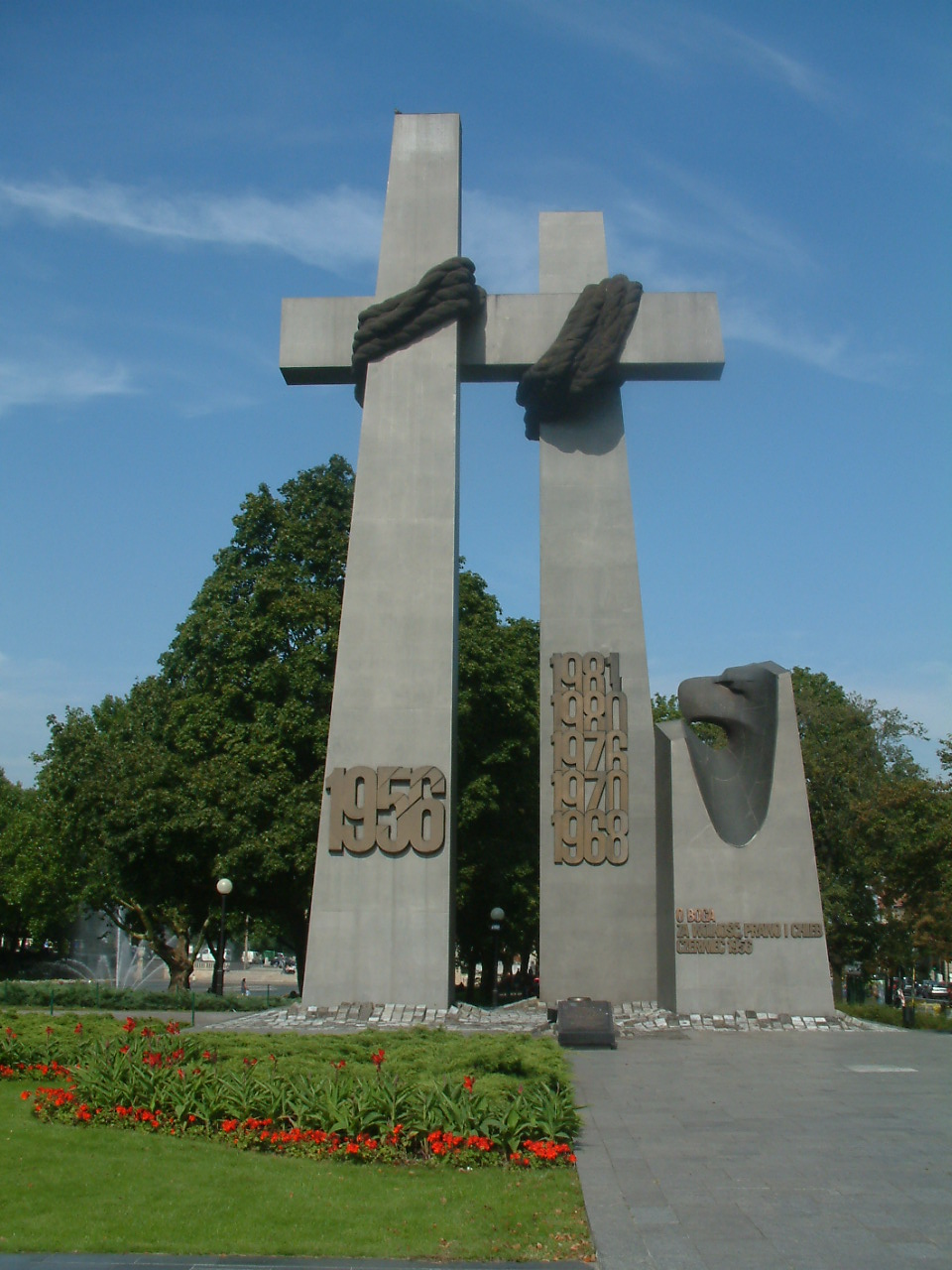
Monument after changes in 2006

Poznań June 1956 Monument (Poznań Crosses) (Polish: Pomnik Poznańskiego Czerwca 1956, also Poznańskie Krzyże) is a monument on Adam Mickiewicz Square in the Imperial District in Poznań, commemorating the 1956 Poznań protests (also known as Poznań June) and subsequent protests in the Polish People's Republic. It was erected on June 19 and officially unveiled on June 28, 1981, on the 25th anniversary of the June events.

The monument consists of two steel crosses: 19.5-meter and 21-meter high (symbols of death and resurrection) connected together, and a monument with the head of an eagle. On the left cross there is the date 1956, referring to Poznań June 56, while on the right cross there are the dates 1968, 1970, 1976, 1980 and 1981. On the right side of the monument there are the main slogans of the protesting workers: "For God, for freedom, law, and bread," and the inscription: "June 1956."

== Preparations ==
After the events of August 1980, one of the first initiatives of the Solidarity trade union organizing in Poznań was the construction of a monument commemorating June 1956. On October 10, 1980, the general meeting of representatives of the Inter-Enterprise Founding Committee of Wielkopolska NSZZ Solidarność formulated a proposal to build a Monument to the Victims of June 1956, which was enthusiastically received by the gathered people. On October 21, the Social Committee for the Construction of the Monument to June 1956 was established, chaired by Roman Brandstaetter. The intention was to erect the monument by the 25th anniversary of the Poznań events, so to meet this deadline, the committee began organizing public collections, cultural, and sports events. This mobilized the community and revived the memory of June 1956.

The next step was to announce a competition for the monument's design on December 5, 1980. In the same month, another competition was organized to decide the inscription for the monument and the four commemorative plaques that were to be placed in front of the main gate of the Hipolit Cegielski Works (HCP), the locomotive and wagon factory, ZNTK, and MPK. After many discussions, on February 6, 1981, the decision was made to implement the project by sculptor Adam Graczyk and architect Włodzimierz Wojciechowski, marked by the emblem "Jedność" ("Unity"): "two walking crosses joined by one arm, with bonds on it, and at the side of the crosses, an eagle guarding them."

The last issues to be resolved were the appropriate location of the monument and obtaining permission from the authorities to erect it. The construction committee considered several concepts. Ultimately, the prevailing opinion was that it should be placed on Mickiewicza Square, where in 1956 a crowd of thousands demanded their rights and freedom. This place was particularly marked by history because in 1932 the Monument to the Sacred Heart of Jesus, a Monument of Gratitude for Regained Independence, was built there before being destroyed by the Nazis during World War II. The authorities tried to prevent the monument from entering the square, as evidenced by the final administrative decision issued on June 16, 1981.

== Construction ==
Most of the work on the monument was carried out in the Cegielski plant, but many other plants helped them. Pomet, ZNTK, and other companies from Greater Poland and across the country participated in the execution of the project. The main contractor for the foundations was the Poznań Construction Company No. 1. The creators encountered many problems along the way, the most serious being the lack of materials, especially those of the right quality, such as steel for casting the main elements of the monument. Allocation and permission to cast the appropriate sheets were obtained only after personal intervention by representatives of the Solidarity union at HCP in several ministries. The first delivery of materials occurred on April 29, 1981.

The welding of the monument's structure from sheets supplied by Huta Batory took place in the welding shop of the W2 Marine Engine Factory. Thanks to intensified efforts, the foundation act was embedded on May 23. The culmination of the work occurred on June 19, when at 2 p.m., trucks carrying the cross structures set off from the HCP factory gates to Mickiewicz Square. During this event, "God, Thou Hast Poland" was sung, and upon arrival at the square, the national anthem was performed. Within just a few hours, assemblers had put together the monument, and by 9 p.m., it could be admired by the crowds of Poznań residents. The final assembly work was completed on June 26, making the structure ready two days before the 25th-anniversary celebrations.

== Parallel preparations and celebrations of the 25th anniversary ==
Parallel to the construction of the monument, preparations for the first official commemorations of June 1956 were underway. All groups and individuals involved in commemorating the anniversary aimed to take advantage of the favorable political climate at the time. To restore the memory of June 1956 and extensively spread knowledge about these events, activities began with exhibitions, scientific sessions, lectures, and the minting of several commemorative medals. One of the significant events was the premiere of the play "Accused: June Fifty-Six," prepared by the New Theater. Additionally, a monograph of the June events titled "Poznań June 1956," edited by Jarosław Maciejewski and Zofia Trojanowiczowa, was prepared.

The Solidarity union at HCP successfully campaigned in the City National Council to change the names of streets in Poznań. On June 27, 1981, commemorative plaques were unveiled at locations associated with the bloody events: in front of the MPK depot on Gajowa Street, at the gate of ZNTK on Robocza Street, at the main gate of HCP and in front of the Locomotive and Wagon Factory (W3), on the façade of the Franciszek Raszeja Hospital building, and on Romka Strzałkowskiego Street. In front of the Cegielski Works, Archbishop Jerzy Stroba celebrated Mass, and Cardinal Franciszek Macharski delivered the homily.

The main ceremonies and the unveiling of the monument, which took place on the 25th anniversary of the events at Mickiewicz Square, gathered around 200,000 people. At 10 AM, factory sirens and church bells signaled the start of the ceremonies. The unveiling of the monument was preceded by official speeches. Among the speakers were Zdzisław Rozwalak, chairman of the Social Committee for the Construction of the Poznań June 1956 Monument; Stanisław Matyja, the informal leader of June 1956; and Lech Wałęsa, chairman of Solidarity. The monument was unveiled jointly by Stanisław Matyja and Anna Strzałkowska. After Archbishop Józef Stroba consecrated the monument, a roll call of the fallen took place, during which a giant sash with the victims' names, listed for the first time, hung from the tower of the Imperial Castle. This was followed by a solemn Mass, during which a telegram from Pope John Paul II was read.

== Later history ==
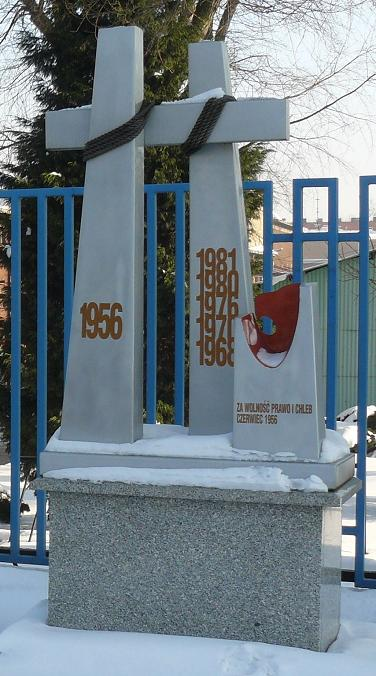
A miniature of the monument in Wilda - in front of the HCP

The introduction of martial law on December 13, 1981, elevated the significance of the crosses to a symbol of the fight for freedom. Mickiewicza Square and the Monument to the Victims of June 1956 became the main place for the inhabitants of Poznań to demonstrate their commitment to independence and fight for their rights. On each subsequent anniversary of June or other fights for freedom, the monument was under special supervision of the militia forces and the Security Service. Despite this, after the pacification of the Wujek Coal Mine, an unknown person painted the date 1981 on the monument, which was quickly painted over with white paint.

Additionally, occasional and anniversary masses at the Dominican church or the Church of the Most Holy Savior often ended with attempts to march to the Poznań Crosses. Attempts to demonstrate at the Crosses always resulted in aggression and attacks by the security forces at that time. Unfortunately, the protests led to two fatalities. In 1982, the ZOMO and MO fatally beat two young men: Wojciech Cieślewicz and Piotr Majchrzak. Following these events, the symbol of the Poznań Crosses became widely recognized and used by the opposition: it reappeared on leaflets, posters, badges, and in the underground press. The Poznań Crosses naturally expressed the aspirations for freedom and independence of the people of Greater Poland through their symbolism.

John Paul II, during his Second Apostolic Journey to Poland, visited Poznań on June 20, 1983. He intended to pray with the faithful at the Poznań Crosses and pay tribute to those who died for freedom in 1956, but the authorities refused to allow him to celebrate mass in this place, instead providing the Culture Park. Only 14 years later, during the 6th pilgrimage to Poland on June 3, 1997, the Pope met with young people at Mickiewicz Square and prayed at the Monument for the victims of the Poznań June.

After the end of martial law, all ceremonies around the Monument took place in a much safer atmosphere. Only after the fall of the People's Republic of Poland in 1989 was there nothing to hinder the full commemoration of June 1956. The revived Solidarity union, local authorities, and the people of Poznań gather every year at the monument and commemorative plaques to honor the memory of the fallen and to remember the difficult history.

The monument, erected with such effort in 1981, required renovation after ten years. The lack of maintenance work had adversely affected its condition. Through the efforts of the Social Committee for the June 1956 Monument, the necessary work was completed, allowing for the ceremonial observance of the 35th anniversary of the events to be held at the monument. In April 1989, the monument underwent renovation, including sandblasting. The missing date, 1981, was also officially added.

=== 50th anniversary of June 1956 ===
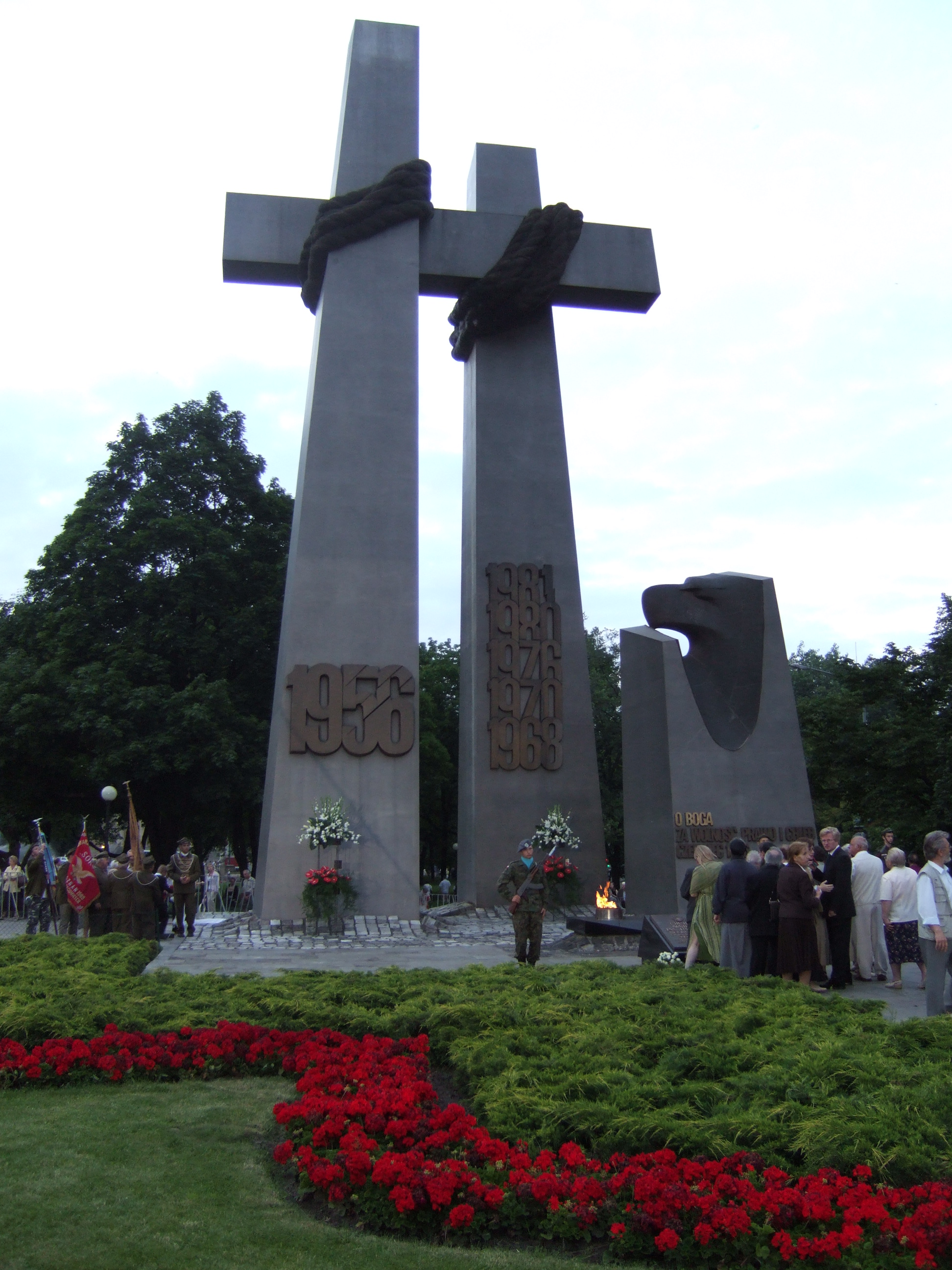
The monument during the commemoration of the 50th anniversary of Poznań June

The 50th anniversary celebrations in 2006 had a special setting around the monument. On June 23, a Mass was held under the Monument to the Victims, attended by thousands of Poznań residents, eighty bishops, and nearly two hundred priests. The solemn procession through the streets of Poznań was led by Stanisław Dziwisz, who guided the faithful from the Church of the Sacred Heart of Jesus to Mickiewicz Square. The Mass was the culmination of the 336th Plenary Assembly of the Polish Episcopal Conference, presided over by Cardinal Józef Glemp, the Primate of Poland. At the end, Stanisław Dziwisz blessed a plaque commemorating Pope John Paul II's visit to Poznań, while the Metropolitan Archbishop of Poznań, Stanisław Gądecki, blessed the restored inscription on the June 1956 Victims' Monument with the added invocation "For God."

On June 28, the fiftieth anniversary of Black Thursday, the celebrations reached their climax. A solemn Mass was held in front of the Poznań Crosses, concelebrated by Archbishop Stanisław Gądecki, who in his sermon emphasized the historical significance of Poznań June as an event that accelerated democratic processes in Poland and signaled similar processes throughout the entire socialist bloc. At the Crosses, Presidents Lech Kaczyński of Poland, Horst Köhler of Germany, Václav Klaus of Czechia, Ivan Gašparovič of Slovakia, and László Sólyom (Hungary) gathered and delivered speeches about the Poznań June. Additionally, present at Mickiewicz Square were Prime Minister Kazimierz Marcinkiewicz, the Marshals of the Sejm and Senate, heads of parliamentary groups, ambassadors, presidents and mayors of Polish cities, mayors of Poznań's partner cities, guests from Belarus and Hungary, honorary and distinguished citizens of Poznań, representatives of the Church, trade unions, veteran organizations, and thousands of Poznań residents.
