= History of Piedmont University =

History of American university

Piedmont University is a private liberal arts institution founded in 1897 to serve residents of the Appalachian area of northeast Georgia, United States.

== Creation ==
In late 1897 the citizens of Demorest petitioned the state of Georgia for the creation of an institution. On September 6, 1897, Habersham County approved the petition and issued a charter for the institution that would later be known as Piedmont College. The citizens of Demorest had purchased a girls' dormitory and had appointed a board of trustees and the college was officially formed.

Although the charter had been obtained, and the institution was on its way to becoming what it is today, the Board of Trustees, who were mostly made up of Methodists across the state, needed a president who would be the driving force for starting the college. The man they chose was Charles C. Spence, a native Georgian who was a graduate of Emory College and former president of Young Harris College.

Spence set up the college in similar fashion to Young Harris. It had three parts: preparatory, academic and collegiate. The preparatory and academic parts were what are now known as elementary, middle, and high schools. The institution was named the J.S. Green Collegiate Institute. Because it was essentially a Methodist school, it was named for local banker and Methodist Jesse S. Green. In 1899, the name was shortened to the J.S. Green College.

== Becoming Piedmont ==
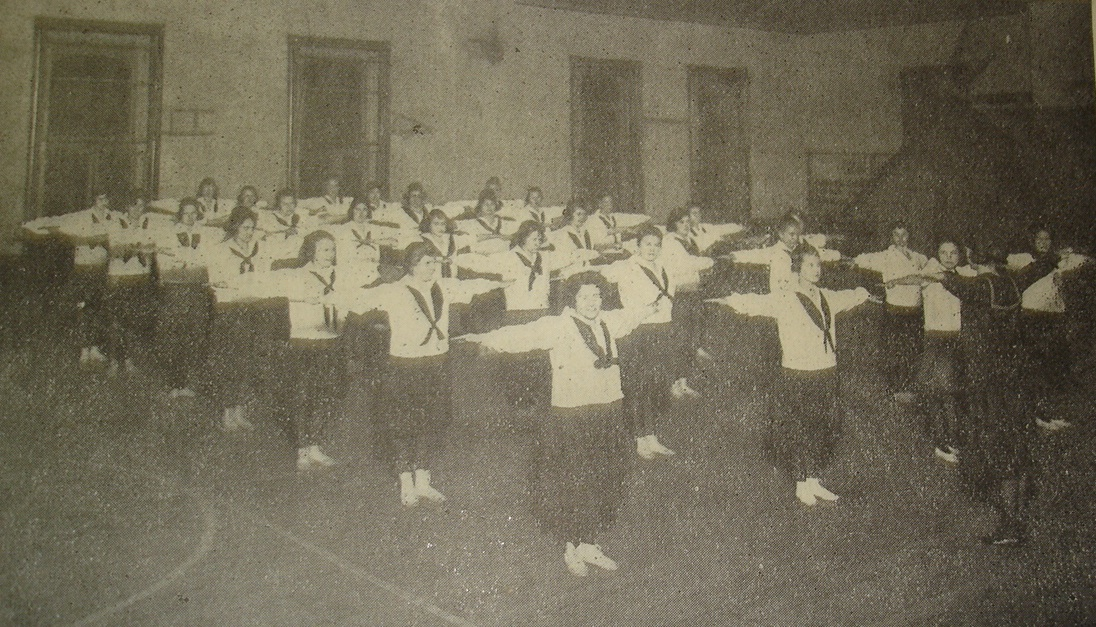
Piedmont College Gym Class circa 1901

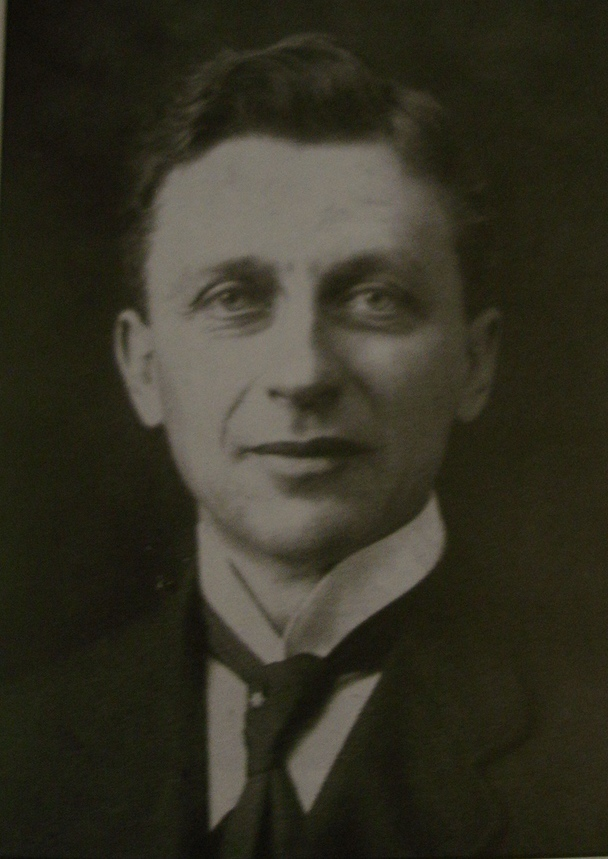
John Charles Campbell

In the early 1900s, there was a large draw to the Demorest area from many northern Congregationalists. This new influx of Congregationalists brought many highly educated people into the college circle. One of these new residents was John Charles Campbell, who would become the second president of Piedmont. Campbell came to Demorest to serve as principal of the preparatory portion of the J.S. Green College. When Spence resigned due to health issues, Campbell was promoted.

Around the same time that Campbell became president, the board of trustees decided to sell the charter for the J.S. Green College to the Congregational churches, who elected all Congregationalists to the new board of trustees. With the changing of ownership came some controversy. It was believed at the time that the school was named after Jesse S. Green because of his religious affiliation with the Methodist church. The Congregationalists wanted the school to not be tied down to one religious association. So in 1903, the college was renamed Piedmont College after the area of Georgia in which it was located.

== Early 1900s ==
Campbell resigned as president in 1907 after deciding he needed to rest more. The third president of the college became Henry Clinton Newell who originally came to Piedmont as a professor of science. Newell would also become the fifth president, coming out of retirement to help the college out. Most of Newell's presidency focused on acquiring financial stability for the college. During Newell's three years, he helped acquire the college's first endowment fund. Newell resigned for many of the same reasons as his predecessors. He resigned because of his declining health.

In 1910, Frank Edwin Jenkins would become the fourth president of Piedmont College. Before becoming president, Jenkins served as the chair of the board of trustees. Where Newell focused heavily on finances, Jenkins focused his efforts on Piedmont's growth and status as an education institution. His first major expansion of the college was acquiring new buildings and upgrading old buildings for a total of 37 usable buildings for the college's use. All of the new expansions cost the college a large sum of money. Since there were no wealthy individual backers, most of the income came from numerous smaller donations. Another source of income, which Jenkins revamped to be more profitable was the College Farm, a 100-acre (0.40 km^{2}) piece of land.

The farm was successful in helping out all aspects of Piedmont. Food from the farm was served at meals, saving the college money. The farm also provided jobs to many male students for a large discount of tuition. The parts of the crops that were left after Piedmont used its share were sold in markets to raise money for the college.

In 1920 the academy, which was the primary schools, discontinued so more effort could be focused into turning Piedmont into a better college.

== 1930s, 40s and 50s ==
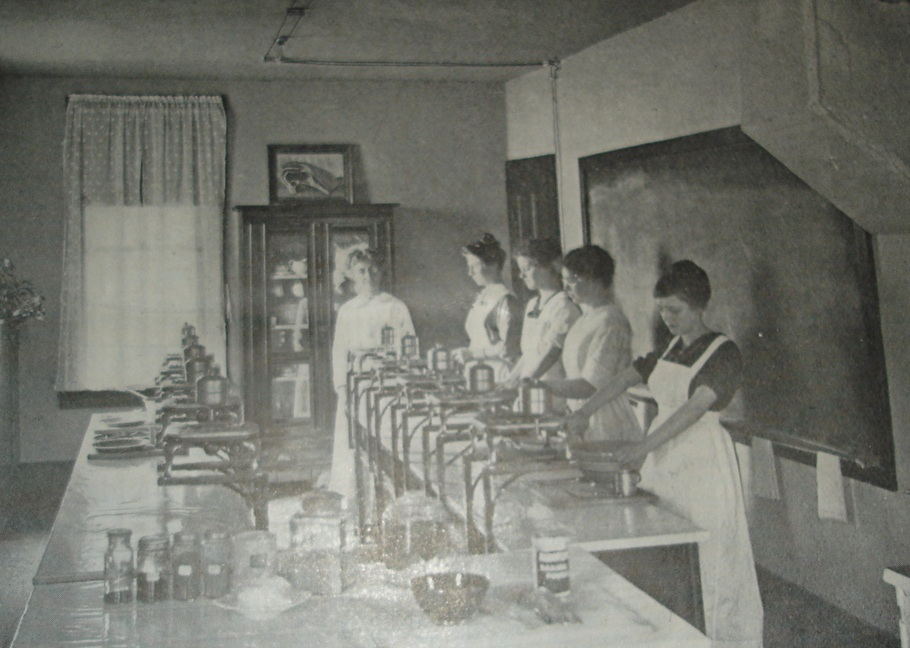
Piedmont College Home Economics Lab circa 1909

Just months after the fall of the stock market on Black Tuesday, Jenkins resigned the presidency back to Newell. Because the economy was bad for most of the nation, Piedmont only barely survived the first few years of the depression. Newell brought the college through those tough years leaving it in 1936 in the hands of George C. Bellingrath, the sixth president of Piedmont.

Because of the depression, funds were not available to acquire new buildings. No other major construction projects took place on the campus. The 1930s found years unprecedented heights in enrollment numbers. Also during this time, Piedmont increased its number of degree programs from three to five: Bachelor of Arts, Bachelor of Science, Bachelor of Philosophy, Bachelor of Science in Home Economics and a Bachelor of Music.

In 1939, Belligrath's contract was not renewed and the board of trustees appointed Malcolm Boyd Dana as president. Dana was the first president of Piedmont College to have been born in the 20th century. Throughout his five years at Piedmont, Dana focused primarily on keeping his ideals of Piedmont being a Christian college a reality.

Another major part of his presidency was devoted to updating the curriculum to more modern educational theories. The program he created to do this aimed "to equip each student with those facts and theories, social skills, and Christian attitudes, essential for constructive citizenship and joyous living".

Before his term ended, Dana made a point to equip the school with six buildings, including a gymnasium that would be shared with Demorest High School. He acquired the funding that Piedmont had not been able to acquire due to the depression of the 1930s. Many of these buildings were set up to be used for physical fitness, something that Dana thought was crucial for college students. With physical fitness came a renewed desire for athletics on the college campus. Dana resigned in 1944 and the current dean, Albert Ray Van Cleave took his place as president for the remainder of the 1940s.

Van Cleave weathered through the rough years that were during World War II. Although the war did have a great effect on the enrollment of Piedmont, it was not the worst crisis Van Cleave had to deal with. The worst crisis was that Piedmont had not been accredited and needed to be or it would be forced to close. This meant the college had to meet the Southern Association of Colleges and Schools' requirements: $500,000 endowment, faculty with appropriate degrees and sufficient income to meet current expenses. Piedmont had no luck finding resources in the south, so Van Cleave had to look for funds in the north. Unfortunately Van Cleave was not able to secure the funds necessary in the time allotted.

== The Walter years ==
The Board of Trustees in 1949 allowed Van Cleave to resume the office of the Dean while James E. Walter would become the 9th president. Walter's presidency was by far the longest in the history of the college as he was president for 34 years. The first major issue that Walter had to tackle was getting the endowment fund up to $500,000 which was $350,000 more than it was when he took office. In his first ten years, Walter was able to raise over $450,000 and bring the endowment fund to an acceptable level.

By June 1953, Walter had won the appreciation for outstanding service and devotion to the college. On June 29 of the same year, Time magazine said, "Of all U.S. college presidents, James E. Walter of Congregational Piedmont college in Demorest, Georgia is probably the most tenacious."

Walter did have his fair share of hatred. In the early 1950s Walter accepted a gift of $500 per month from the "anti-Semitic, anti-Negro Judge George Armstrong's Texas Education Association". After firing Piedmont's treasurer for speaking out against the gift, Walter received 106 letters from faculty and students requesting his resignation. Walter dealt with the unhappiness, and continued as president so he could continue to help the college.

In 1951, Walter invited retired General George Van Horn Moseley to speak. Students and faculty protested because of Mosley's racist and antisemitic views. Time called him a "trumpeter for Aryan supremacy". One faculty member was fired for speaking in opposition to the speaking engagement. Calls for the president's resignation followed. Almost the entire faculty and nine trustees resigned in the next two years and enrollment fell by two-thirds.

Piedmont received accreditation in 1965. Walter had increased the endowment fund into the double-digit million-dollar mark by 1982. Walter had decided that his time as president needed to come to an end and in 1983 he retired.

== The end of the century ==
Because of Walter's long term as president, the board of trustees was well-prepared for his successor. David Garen Simmons took over from Walter in 1983.

The last twenty years of the 20th century at Piedmont are marked as the "years of change". The curriculum expanded to include new majors and minors, computers made appearances throughout the faculty and staff offices, and a program for non-traditional students was created.

Simmons retired to just teaching history in 1990 after Walter died in 1989 and John F. Elger took his place as president for the next five years. Most of Elger's presidency is marked by the change in buildings and facilities across campus. New buildings were purchased; old buildings got remodeled and had extensions added. Plans were started to get a new pipe organ installed in the college chapel. Another major change under Elger was the creation of the Master of Art in Teaching program. John Elger retired from education and administration in 1995.

W. Ray Cleere became president in 1995, taking the reins from Elger. President Cleere has seen the college through many building expansions and curriculum expansions. Approximately six majors were added to the various programs at Piedmont during Cleere's presidency.

== 21st century ==
One of the major feats of Cleere's time at Piedmont was expanding the college into a second campus. Piedmont College leased property in Athens, Georgia to start their new campus. Later the college purchased property from Prince Avenue Baptist Church. In 2007 the Athens campus started its first students for the four-year degree.

A dark spot on Cleere's record were the false accusations against Richard Jewell for the Olympic Park bombing at Atlanta, in 1996. It was Cleere who first alerted the FBI that they should look at Jewell, a former security guard at Piedmont, after Cleere watched Jewell's CNN Interview. Jewell was later exonerated, and a lawsuit against Cleere and Piedmont College was settled out of court.

The Board of Trustees, which in March 2013 had named Dr. James Mellichamp interim president, voted May 4 to make the position permanent. Mellichamp becomes the 13th president of Piedmont to serve during the 115-year history of the college, which has campuses in Demorest and Athens. He joined Piedmont in 1982 as a professor of music, a position he has held since that time. But he has also worn a number of hats at the college, including most recently serving as Provost, Vice President for Academic Affairs, and Dean of the School of Arts and Sciences.

In 2019, Piedmont College then president James Mellichamp was accused of sexual harassment by tenured professor Rick Austin, who was also the mayor of Demorest. However, the Equal Employment Opportunity Commission was unable to conclude that Austin's accusations stated any claim for violating law. Piedmont College sued the City of Demorest, demanding that Austin forfeit his tenured position and resign as mayor. Piedmont filed the lawsuit in December 2020. The university argued that the mayor and city council of Demorest violated its constitutional rights under the Equal Protection Clause of the 14th Amendment of the U.S. Constitution when the city instituted a rate hike in water and sewage fees targeted solely at the college beginning in 2019. On February 7, 2023, the city and Piedmont University settled the lawsuit in the university’s favor including a payment from Demorest to the university of $70,000 to cover disputed water and sewer fees. Austin had stepped down as mayor when his term ended in 2021, and both Mellichamp and Austin had left the university.

In April 2021, Piedmont College changed its name to Piedmont University.
