= Sisir Kumar Mitra =

Indian physicist

S.K. Mitra MBE, FNI, FASB, FIAS, FRS
- শিশির কুমার মিত্র
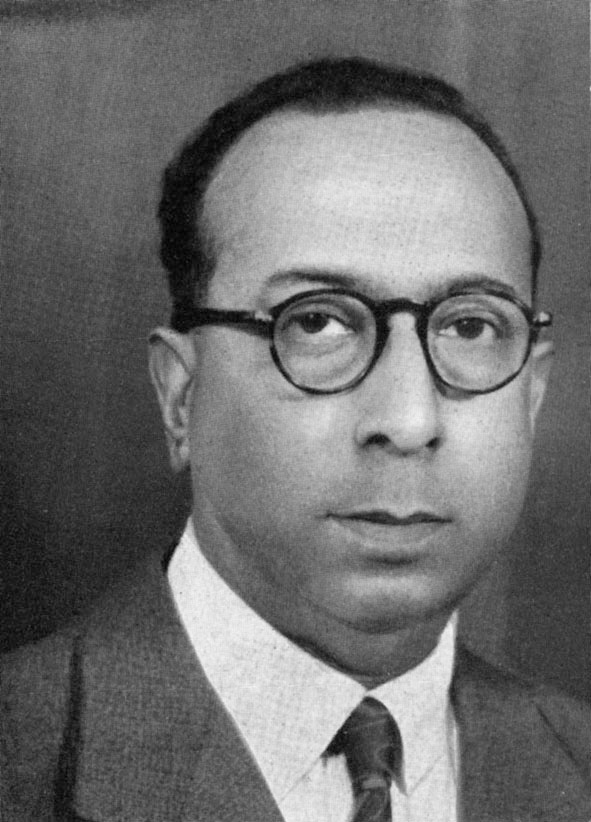
- S.K. Mitra
- Born: Sisir Kumar Mitra; 24 October 1890; Konnagar, Hooghly district, Bengal Presidency, British India (now in West Bengal, India)
- Died: 13 August 1963 (aged 72); Ballygunge, Kolkata, West Bengal, India
- Education: University of Calcutta
- Known for: Work on the ionosphere
- Spouse: Lilavati Biswas (1914–1939)
- Awards: Fellow of the Indian National Science Academy (FNI) (1935); Member of the Order of the British Empire (MBE) (1938); Fellow of the Royal Society (FRS) (1958); Padma Bhushan (1962)
- Scientific career
- Fields: Radiophysics; Atmospheric physics
- Workplaces: Bankura Christian College; Rajabazar Science College; University of Paris; University of Nancy; University of Calcutta; Curie Institute (Paris)
- Doctoral advisor: C.V. Raman; Charles Fabry
- Other academic advisors: Jagadish Chandra Bose; Marie Curie; Camille Gutton

Sisir Kumar Mitra (or Shishirkumar Mitra) MBE, FNI, FASB, FIAS, FRS (24 October 1890 – 13 August 1963) was an Indian physicist.

== Early life and education ==
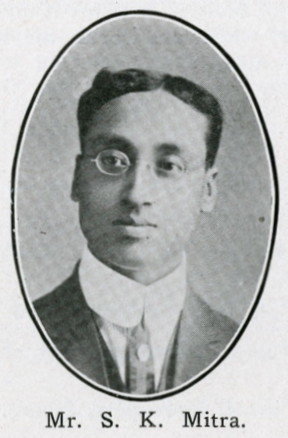
Photograph of S.K. Mitra from the January 1916 issue of The Hindusthanee Student.

Mitra was born in his father's hometown of Konnagar, a suburb of Kolkata (then Calcutta) located in the Hooghly District in the Bengal Presidency (present-day West Bengal). He was the third son of Joykrishna Mitra, who was a schoolteacher at the time of Mitra's birth, and Saratkumari, a medical student whose family came from Midnapore. While Mitra's paternal family were orthodox Hindus, his mother's family were adherents of the progressive Brahmo Samaj, and were noted in Midnapore for their advanced outlook. In 1878, Joykrishna Mitra had joined the Brahmo Samaj and married his wife, against the wishes of his family, who responded by severing ties with him. As a consequence, the newly wed couple moved to Saratkumari's hometown of Midnapore, where Joykrishna and his wife had two sons – Satish Kumar and Santosh Kumar – and a daughter before Joykrishna moved his family to Kolkata in 1889; there, he became a schoolteacher. Mitra was born the following year.

While in Kolkata, Joykrishna became acquainted with several distinguished scholars, notably Ishwar Chandra Vidyasagar and Bipin Chandra Pal. Sharing Saratkumari's progressive outlook, Joykrishna secured his wife's admission as a student at Campbell Medical College. In 1892, Saratkumari qualified as a physician and received an appointment at the Lady Dufferin Hospital in the city of Bhagalpur, then in the Bengal Presidency (now in Bihar). The family thus moved to Bhagalpur, where Saratkumari began her new career, with Joykrishna securing a position as a municipal clerk. A third son, Mitra's younger brother Sarat Kumar, was born at Bhagalpur shortly after.

In Bhagalpur, Mitra began school at the Bhagalpore Zilla School. Around 1897–1898, when aged six or seven, his interest in atmospheric science began after hearing the story of Ramchandra Chatterjee, a Bengali aeronaut who a year before Mitra's birth, on 4 May 1889, had become the first Indian to make a solo balloon flight. The story prompted Mitra to ask his elder brother Satish Kumar about the principles of lighter-than-air flight; his brother explained as best as he could. A few years afterwards, both of Mitra's elder brothers died; following this death, Joykrishna soon had a paralytic attack and became disabled. Despite the family's increasing financial burdens, Saratkumari managed to educate her two surviving sons. During his childhood and adolescence, Mitra nurtured his interest in science through reading popular scientific articles by leading Bengali scientists, including some by Jagadish Chandra Bose. After passing his examinations from the Bhagalpore Zilla school, Mitra was admitted to the FA (intermediate-level) program at the T.N.J. College; his father Joykrishna died shortly after.

After passing his FA examinations in 1908, Mitra was admitted as a student in Presidency College of the University of Calcutta where he earned a B.Sc. He continued to develop a passion for physics and scientific research, and was accepted by Jagadish Bose as a research scholar upon completing his master's degree in 1912 with the highest honours. He worked under Professor Bose for a few months before being forced to end his studies due to his family's financial difficulties.

== University studies and research in France ==
To support his family, after leaving the University of Calcutta, Mitra secured an appointment as a lecturer at his former college, T. N. J. College. Following a brief period there, he was appointed a lecturer at Bankura Christian College. Frustrated by the lack of research opportunities at both institutions, Mitra channelled his energy into developing innovative experiments to demonstrate to his students and writing popular scientific articles in Bengali. In 1916, he was invited by Ashutosh Mukherjee to return to Calcutta University as a post-graduate physics scholar in the new University Science College. There he conducted research into the diffraction and interference of light under C. V. Raman, enhancing Raman's previous research on the diffraction of monochromatic light in an oblique single slit and also devising a better method for determining heliometer diffraction patterns. For this work, which Raman greatly appreciated, Mitra gained a D.Sc. degree in 1919. He also published three papers in the Philosophical Magazine, including one on "Asymmetry of the Illumination Curves in Oblique Diffraction", and another on Arnold Sommerfeld's approaches to diffraction.

After receiving his doctorate, Mitra left for France in 1920 to continue his studies at the University of Paris. There he earned a second doctorate under Charles Fabry in 1923, for a thesis on the determination of wavelength standards in the 2,000–2,300 Å region of copper. He subsequently worked briefly under Marie Curie at the Curie Institute. Made aware of continual developments in the new science of radio communications, Mitra went to the University of Nancy and joined the laboratory of Camille Gutton. Under Gutton, Mitra conducted research on radio valve circuitry before returning to India in late 1923.

== Research in India ==
Prior to returning to India, Mitra had corresponded with Ashutosh Mukherjee about the growing importance of Wireless science and the need to include it in the post-graduate physics curriculum at the Rajabazar Science College, University of Calcutta. Upon his return to Kolkata, he was appointed the university's Khaira Professor of Physics. With Mukherjee's support, in 1924 a "Wireless" course was introduced as an elective in the Physics MSc. curriculum and a Wireless Laboratory established for research in electron tubes and radio wave propagation. He also initiated a new department at the University of Calcutta that later became the Institute of Radio Physics and Electronics. Mitra was the Guide to many Ph.D. students, prominent among them was Arun Kumar Choudhury.

== Awards and honors ==
- Member of the Order of the British Empire (MBE), 1938
- Fellowship of the Royal Society, 1958
- Fellow of the Asiatic Society of Bengal (FASB)
- Fellow of the Indian Association for the Cultivation of Science (FIAS; 1943)
- Presidency of The Asiatic Society, 1951–53.
- Presidency of the Indian National Science Academy, 1959–60.
- National Professorship, 1962.
- Padma Bhushan, 1962.
- S. K. Mitra Center for Research in Space Environment of the University of Calcutta is named for him.
- The crater Mitra on the Moon is named after him.
