= Rock Creek Junior/Senior High School =

Location
- 9355 Flush Road; St. George, Kansas 66535; United States; 39°18′09″N 96°26′18″W

Information
- Type: Public
- Established: 1991
- School district: Rock Creek USD 323
- NCES School ID: 200000401708
- Principal: Sammual Pahls
- Faculty: 26.16 (on FTE basis)
- Grades: 5–12
- Enrollment: 389 (2023-2024)
- Student to teacher ratio: 14.87
- Colors: Black, White, Silver, & Blue
- Mascot: Mustangs
- Accreditation: Blue Ribbon 2009.
- Website: www.usd323.org/page/rock-creek-hs

Rock Creek High School (RCHS or RCMS) is a high school that sits between and serves the townships of St. George and Westmoreland, Kansas. It is operated by Rock Creek USD 323 school district.

== History ==
The school was established in 1991 and combined the student bodies of Westmoreland High School and Saint George High School. It originally enrolled grades 7–12 as Rock Creek Jr./Sr. High School. In 2020, an addition to the school was completed, increasing the grades enrolled to 5-12 as Rock Creek High School and Rock Creek Middle School.

== Academics ==
In 2009, Rock Creek Junior/Senior High School was selected as a Blue Ribbon School. The Blue Ribbon Award recognizes public and private schools which perform at high levels or have made significant academic improvements.

== See also ==
- List of high schools in Kansas
- List of unified school districts in Kansas
