= Rock Creek USD 323 =

Public school district in St. George, Kansas

Address
- 9353 Flush Road St. George, Kansas, 66535; United States

District information
- Type: Public
- Grades: PreK to 12
- Established: 1991
- Superintendent: Joan Simoneau
- Schools: 3
- NCES District ID: 2000004

Students and staff
- District mascot: Mustangs
- Colors: Silver; Black

Other information
- Website: www.usd323.org

Rock Creek USD 323 is a public unified school district headquartered in St. George, Kansas, United States. The district includes the communities of St George, Westmoreland, Blaine, Flush, and nearby rural areas.

== Schools ==
The school district operates the following schools:

- Rock Creek Junior/Senior High School in St George
- St. George Elementary School in St. George
- Westmoreland Elementary School in Westmoreland

== Athletics ==
Football:

- 2000 - 3A Mid-East League, District, Bi-District, Regional, Sectional Champs
- 2002 - 3A District, Bi-District Champs
- 2003 - 3A District, Bi-District Champs
- 2004 - 3A Mid-East League, Bi-District Champs
- 2005 - 3A District, Bi-District Champs
- 2006 - 3A District, Bi-District Champs
- 2008 - 4A District, Bi-District, and Regional Champs
- 2011 - 3A Bi-District, Regional, and Sectional Champs, Substate Runner-up

== See also ==
- Kansas State Department of Education
- Kansas State High School Activities Association
- List of high schools in Kansas
- List of unified school districts in Kansas
