= Benjamin Butler (artist) =

American painter

Benjamin Butler (born April 20, 1975) is an American artist, based in Vienna, Austria.

== Biography ==
Born in Westmoreland, Kansas and raised in Wamego, Kansas, Butler studied painting at Emporia State University before attending graduate school at the School of the Art Institute of Chicago to earn his Masters of Fine Arts in 2000. He subsequently moved to New York City, having his first solo show of paintings at Team Gallery in 2002. He soon earned critical accolades for his paintings of mountains and trees, and followed with international exhibitions in New York City, Toronto, Tokyo, Vienna, London, Berlin, Austin, Basel, Beijing, and Los Angeles. He is currently represented by Tomio Koyama in Tokyo and Klaus von Nichtssagend in New York.

Ken Johnson described his work in The New York Times in 2005: "Mr. Butler is toying like a Pop artist with conventions of early 20th-century abstraction...he also revels in painting as an end in itself; so he and we get to have it both ways: we can be both knowing intellectuals and paint-loving hedonists". Writer Roberta Smith has written about his work that "Few representational painters have managed to rid themselves of quite so much representation and still make pictures." Will Heinrich has written, also in The New York Times: "Mr. Butler has narrowed his focus even further, to thrillingly psychedelic effect: His work now seems balanced on a razor blade between Conceptual practice and “The Starry Night,” but at the same time, somehow, it has ample room to move."
