= Wallace Allen (cricketer) =

Irish cricketer

Personal information
- Full name: John Wallace Allen
- Born: 17 April 1921; Cullion, Ireland
- Died: 10 September 1987 (aged 66); Derry, Northern Ireland
- Nickname: Waldo
- Batting: Right-handed
- Bowling: Right-arm slow

Domestic team information
- Years: Team
- 1948: Ireland

Career statistics
Competition	First-class
Matches	1
Runs scored	0
Batting average	0.00
100s/50s	0/0
Top score	0
Catches/stumpings	0/–
- Source: Cricinfo, 18 March 2021

John Wallace Allen (17 February 1921 – 10 September 1987) was an Irish first-class cricketer.

Allen was born at Cullion near Derry in February 1921, and was educated in the city at Foyle College. A prominent all-rounder in club cricket in the north-west of Ireland, he recorded the first century in the final of the Faughan Valley Cup Final, making an unbeaten 176 for City of Derry against Waterside in 1946. In addition to powerful batting, Allen was also a slow bowler, often deployed when the principal bowlers were not taking wickets. Following success in club cricket, he later made a single appearance in first-class cricket for Ireland against the touring Marylebone Cricket Club at Dublin in 1948; however, he was not originally selected for the match, but was brought into the team as a replacement for George Wilson five days before the start. Allen's only appearance for Ireland was not a successful one, with him batting once in Ireland's first innings, where he was dismissed without scoring by Michael Wrigley. The match, which was curtailed by rain, resulted in a draw. Allen later died at Derry in September 1987.
