= William Pearson (cricketer) =

Australian cricketer

Personal information
- Born: 10 November 1912; Kerang, Australia
- Died: 11 September 1987 (aged 74); Melbourne, Australia

Domestic team information
- Years: Team
- 1936-1938: Victoria
- Source: Cricinfo, 22 November 2015

William Pearson (10 November 1912 – 11 September 1987) was an Australian cricketer. He played 14 first-class cricket matches for Victoria between 1936 and 1938.

Pearson was also a leading amateur Australian rules footballer, becoming the first footballer to kick over 200 goals in a season. Playing for Old Scotch Football Club in the Victorian Amateur Football Association (VAFA), Pearson kicked 220 goals in the 1934 season, including 30 goals in a match against Brunswick.

Pearson finished his career with Old Scotch in 1937 kicking 1022 goals from only 136 games at a remarkably high average of 7.51 a game. Since Pearson’s feat in 1934, only eleven more footballers have reached the double century.

== See also ==
- List of Victoria first-class cricketers
