= Westmoreland, Kansas =

City in Pottawatomie County, Kansas

- City and County seat
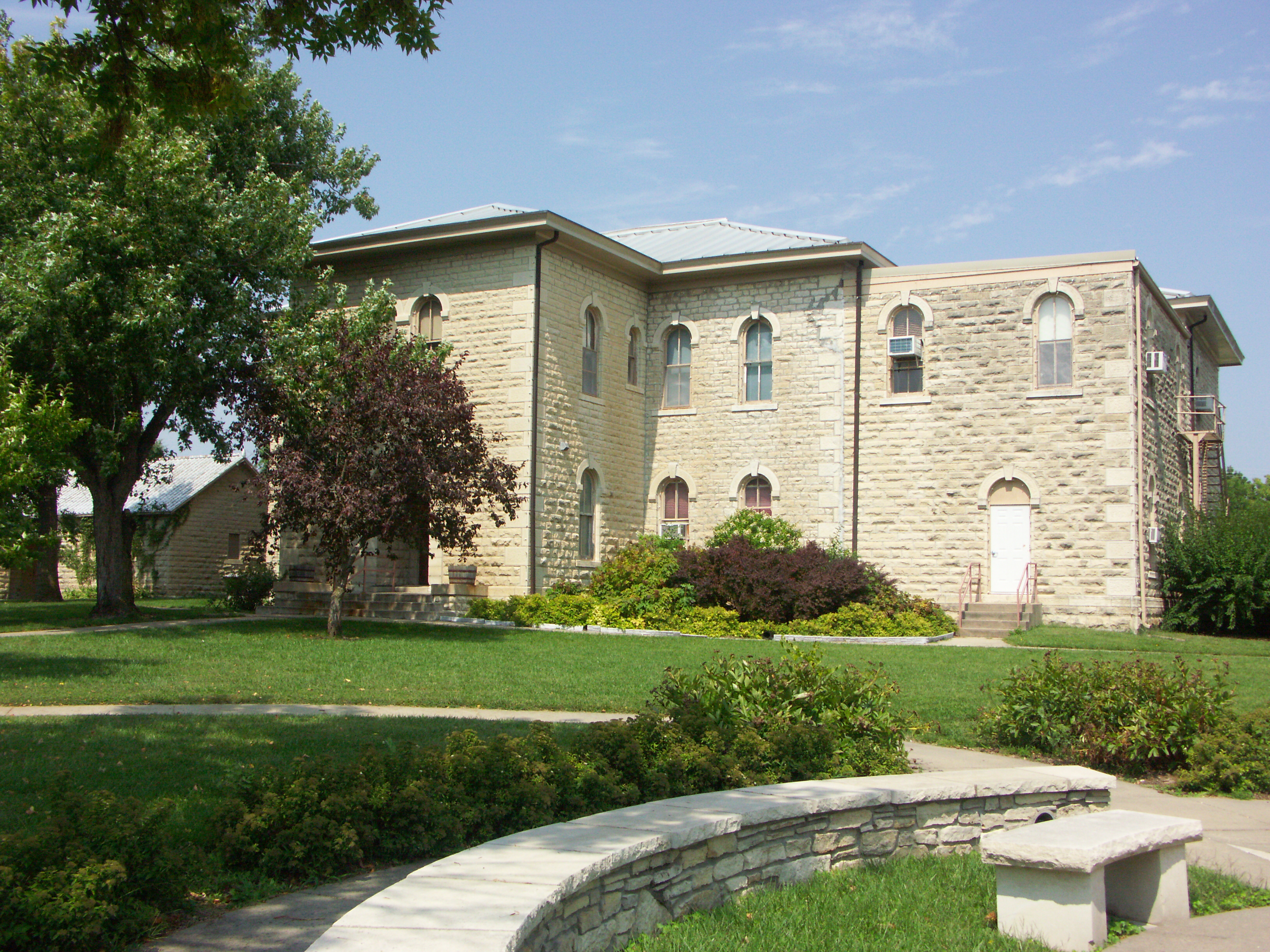
- Pottawatomie County Court House (2009)

- Location within Pottawatomie County and Kansas

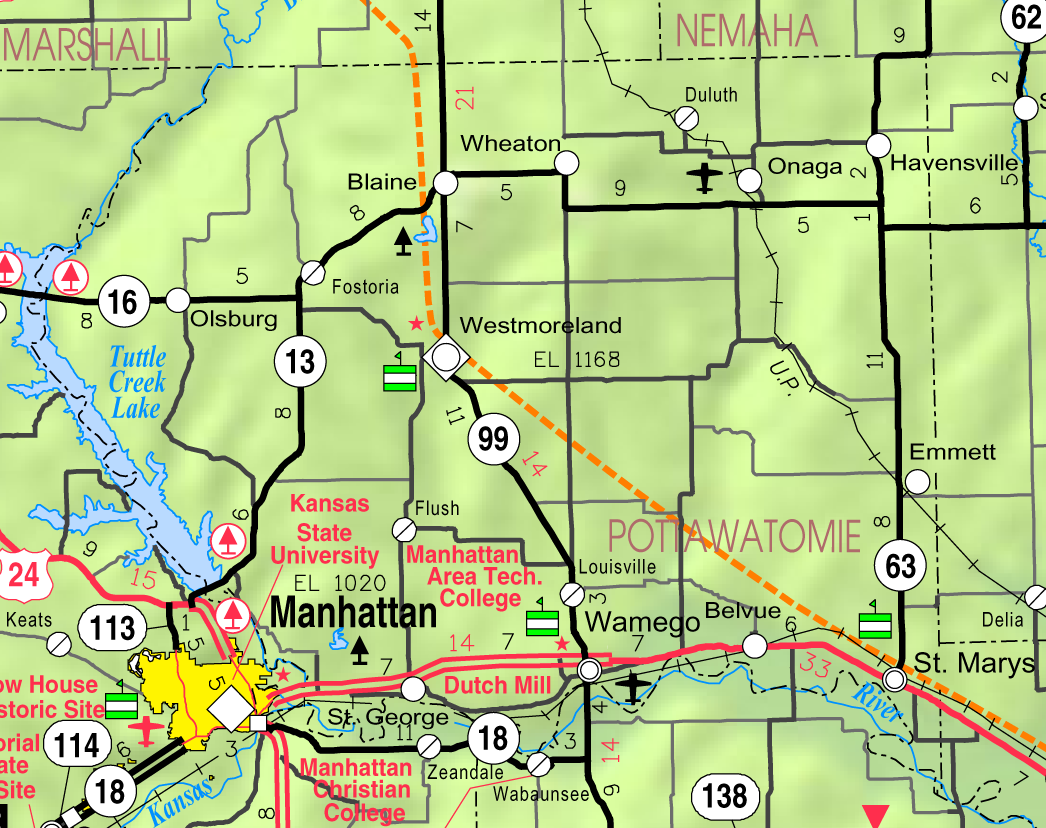
- KDOT map of Pottawatomie County (legend)
- Coordinates: 39°23′39″N 96°24′49″W
- Country: United States
- State: Kansas
- County: Pottawatomie
- Platted: 1871
- Incorporated: 1884
- Named for: Westmoreland County, Pennsylvania

Area
  - Total: 0.49 sq mi (1.27 km^{2})
  - Land: 0.49 sq mi (1.27 km^{2})
  - Water: 0 sq mi (0.00 km^{2})
- Elevation: 1,204 ft (367 m)

Population (2020)
  - Total: 740
  - Density: 1,500/sq mi (580/km^{2})
- Time zone: UTC-6 (CST)
  - Summer (DST): UTC-5 (CDT)
- ZIP Codes: 66426, 66549
- Area code: 785
- FIPS code: 20-77200
- GNIS ID: 2397281
- Website: cityofwestmorelandks.org

Westmoreland is a city in and the county seat of Pottawatomie County, Kansas, United States. As of the 2020 census, the population of the city was 740.

== History ==
Westmoreland was platted in 1871. It was named after Westmoreland County, Pennsylvania.

On April 30, 2024, an EF3 tornado struck Westmoreland, causing one death and three injuries, destroying 22 homes, and damaging 13 homes that remained in livable condition.

== Geography ==
According to the United States Census Bureau, the city has a total area of 0.52 square miles (1.35 km^{2}), all land.

== Demographics ==
Historical population
Census	Pop.	Note	%±
1890	478		—
1900	620		29.7%
1910	484		−21.9%
1920	386		−20.2%
1930	501		29.8%
1940	532		6.2%
1950	416		−21.8%
1960	460		10.6%
1970	485		5.4%
1980	598		23.3%
1990	541		−9.5%
2000	631		16.6%
2010	778		23.3%
2020	740		−4.9%
U.S. Decennial Census

Westmoreland is part of the Manhattan metropolitan area.

=== 2010 census ===
As of the census of 2010, there were 778 people, 301 households, and 192 families residing in the city. The population density was 1,496.2 inhabitants per square mile (577.7/km^{2}). There were 337 housing units at an average density of 648.1 per square mile (250.2/km^{2}). The racial makeup of the city was 96.5% White, 0.4% African American, 0.9% Native American, 0.1% Asian, 0.3% Pacific Islander, 0.9% from other races, and 0.9% from two or more races. Hispanic or Latino of any race were 2.4% of the population.

There were 301 households, of which 33.9% had children under the age of 18 living with them, 48.5% were married couples living together, 9.3% had a female householder with no husband present, 6.0% had a male householder with no wife present, and 36.2% were non-families. 32.6% of all households were made up of individuals, and 17.3% had someone living alone who was 65 years of age or older. The average household size was 2.36 and the average family size was 2.97.

The median age in the city was 41.5 years. 24.9% of residents were under the age of 18; 5.6% were between the ages of 18 and 24; 22.4% were from 25 to 44; 25.8% were from 45 to 64; and 21.5% were 65 years of age or older. The gender makeup of the city was 47.7% male and 52.3% female.

=== 2000 census ===
As of the census of 2000, there were 631 people, 262 households, and 171 families residing in the city. The population density was 1,200.8 inhabitants per square mile (463.6/km^{2}). There were 293 housing units at an average density of 557.6 per square mile (215.3/km^{2}). The racial makeup of the city was 98.42% White, 0.32% Native American, 0.48% from other races, and 0.79% from two or more races. Hispanic or Latino of any race were 1.58% of the population.

There were 262 households, out of which 27.9% had children under the age of 18 living with them, 55.3% were married couples living together, 7.3% had a female householder with no husband present, and 34.4% were non-families. 30.9% of all households were made up of individuals, and 18.3% had someone living alone who was 65 years of age or older. The average household size was 2.26 and the average family size was 2.85.

In the city, the population was spread out, with 22.8% under the age of 18, 5.5% from 18 to 24, 25.2% from 25 to 44, 21.1% from 45 to 64, and 25.4% who were 65 years of age or older. The median age was 43 years. For every 100 females, there were 83.4 males. For every 100 females age 18 and over, there were 81.7 males.

The median income for a household in the city was $31,583, and the median income for a family was $40,833. Males had a median income of $26,071 versus $19,844 for females. The per capita income for the city was $17,290. About 5.2% of families and 11.5% of the population were below the poverty line, including 13.4% of those under age 18 and 16.0% of those age 65 or over.

== Education ==
The community is served by Rock Creek USD 323 public school district, which was formed through school unification by consolidating St. George and Westmoreland schools. Rock Creek High School is located approximately halfway between the two communities, and its mascot is Rock Creek Mustangs. Westmoreland Elementary School is located in Westmoreland.

Westmoreland High School was closed through school unification in 1991. The Westmoreland High School mascot was Westmoreland Wildcats.

== Notable people ==
- Benjamin Butler, painter
- Billie Moore, basketball coach, member of the Basketball Hall of Fame
- Frank Wiziarde, better known as "Whizzo the Clown"
