= Ned Day =

American journalist

- Born: Edward Gately Day, Jr. April 5, 1945; Milwaukee, Wisconsin, U.S.
- Died: September 3, 1987 (aged 42); Hawaii, U.S.
- Resting place: Palm Memorial Park, Las Vegas, U.S.
- Occupation: Journalist
- Children: 1

Edward Gately Day, Jr. (April 5, 1945 – September 3, 1987) was an American journalist and newspaper reporter who was known for taking on mobsters who dominated a number of Las Vegas casinos in the 1970s and '80s.

== Biography ==
Day's father, also named Ned Day Sr., was a professional bowler. After several attempts to follow his father's career path, he moved to Las Vegas in the mid-1970s.

== Career ==
After moving to Las Vegas, Day began working as a reporter for the former North Las Vegas Valley Times newspaper. He later wrote columns for the Las Vegas Review-Journal. In the late 1970s, he became the managing editor and a reporter for KLAS-TV. His trademark on-air signoff was "I thought you'd like to know, I'm Ned Day."

In 1986, Day's car, which he was not in at the time, was torched. Day described it as "the happiest day in my life, when the mob firebombed my car."

On September 3, 1987, Day died on vacation while snorkeling in Hawaii, at 42. The coroner's office ruled it a natural death from a heart attack.
