= Ralph Cobbold (cricketer) =

English cricketer

Personal information
- Born: 22 May 1906; Calne, Wiltshire
- Died: 1 September 1987 (aged 81); Ipswich, Suffolk
- Source: Cricinfo, 17 April 2017

Ralph Cobbold (22 May 1906 – 1 September 1987) was an English cricketer. He played fourteen first-class matches for Cambridge University Cricket Club between 1926 and 1928.

== See also ==
- List of Cambridge University Cricket Club players
