= Joshua Croft =

Australian rules footballer, born 1900

Personal information
- Full name: Joshua Thomas Croft
- Born: 27 April 1900; Rochester, Victoria
- Died: 20 September 1987 (aged 87); Baxter, Victoria
- Original team: Ringwood

Playing career^{1}
Years	Club	Games (Goals)
1925–27	Footscray	24 (17)
- ^{1} Playing statistics correct to the end of 1927.

Joshua Thomas Croft (27 April 1900 – 20 September 1987) was an Australian rules footballer who played with Footscray in the Victorian Football League (VFL).
