= John Green (Warwickshire cricketer) =

English cricketer

Personal information
- Full name: John Herbert Green
- Born: 9 May 1908; Kenilworth, Warwickshire, England
- Died: 13 September 1987 (aged 79); Hove, Sussex, England
- Batting: Right-handed
- Bowling: Slow left-arm orthodox

Domestic team information
- Years: Team
- 1927: Warwickshire

Career statistics
Competition	First-class
Matches	1
Runs scored	0
Batting average	–
100s/50s	–/–
Top score	0*
Balls bowled	24
Wickets	–
Bowling average	–
5 wickets in innings	–
10 wickets in match	–
Best bowling	–
Catches/stumpings	–/–
- Source: Cricinfo, 8 May 2012

John Herbert Green (9 May 1908 – 13 September 1987) was an English cricketer. Green was a right-handed batsman who bowled slow left-arm orthodox. He was born at Kenilworth, Warwickshire, and was educated at Brighton College.

Green made a single first-class appearance for Warwickshire against Worcestershire at the New Road, Worcester, in the 1927 County Championship. Warwickshire won the toss and elected to bat, making 216 all out in their first-innings, with Green ending the innings not out without scoring. Worcestershire responded in their first-innings with 289 all out, with Green bowling four wicketless overs. Warwickshire reached 139/3 in their second-innings, with the match declared a draw. This was his only major appearance for Warwickshire.

He died at Hove, Sussex, on 13 September 1987.
