= Norm McDermott =

Australian rules footballer, born 1913

Personal information
- Full name: Norman Francis McDermott
- Born: 13 May 1913; Albury, New South Wales
- Died: 4 September 1987 (aged 74); Pascoe Vale South, Victoria
- Original team: East Brunswick
- Height: 173 cm (5 ft 8 in)
- Weight: 71 kg (157 lb)

Playing career^{1}
Years	Club	Games (Goals)
1937–39	Essendon	21 (13)
1940–41	Brunswick (VFA)	7 (4)
- ^{1} Playing statistics correct to the end of 1939.

Norman Francis McDermott (13 May 1913 – 4 September 1987) was an Australian rules footballer who played with Essendon in the Victorian Football League (VFL).

McDermott later played with Brunswick in the Victorian Football Association before serving briefly in the Australian Army during World War II.
