= François Eisenbarth =

Luxembourgish gymnast (1928–1987)

- Born: 27 March 1928 Rumelange, Luxembourg
- Died: 17 September 1987 (aged 59) Luxembourg City, Luxembourg

Gymnastics career
- Discipline: Men's artistic gymnastics
- Country represented: Luxembourg

François Eisenbarth (27 March 1928 – 17 September 1987) was a Luxembourgish gymnast. He competed in six events at the 1960 Summer Olympics.
