= Yevgeniya Bogdanovskaya =

Soviet diver

Personal information
- Born: 29 December 1917 Russian SFSR
- Died: 15 September 1987 (aged 69) Moscow, Russian SFSR, Soviet Union

Sport
- Sport: Diving

Yevgeniya Mikhaylovna Bogdanovskaya (Russian: Евгения Михайловна Богдановская, 29 December 1917 – 15 September 1987) was a Soviet diver. She competed in the 10 m platform at the 1952 Summer Olympics and finished in eighth place.
