= St. George, Kansas =

City in Pottawatomie County, Kansas

- City
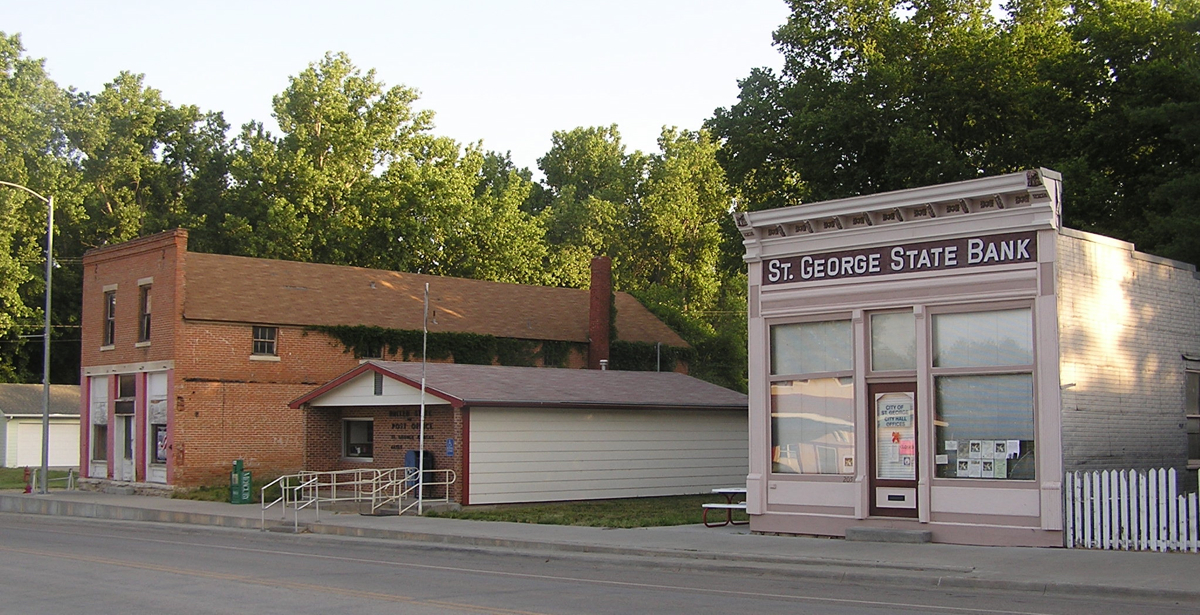
- First Street in St. George (2012)

- Location within Pottawatomie County and Kansas

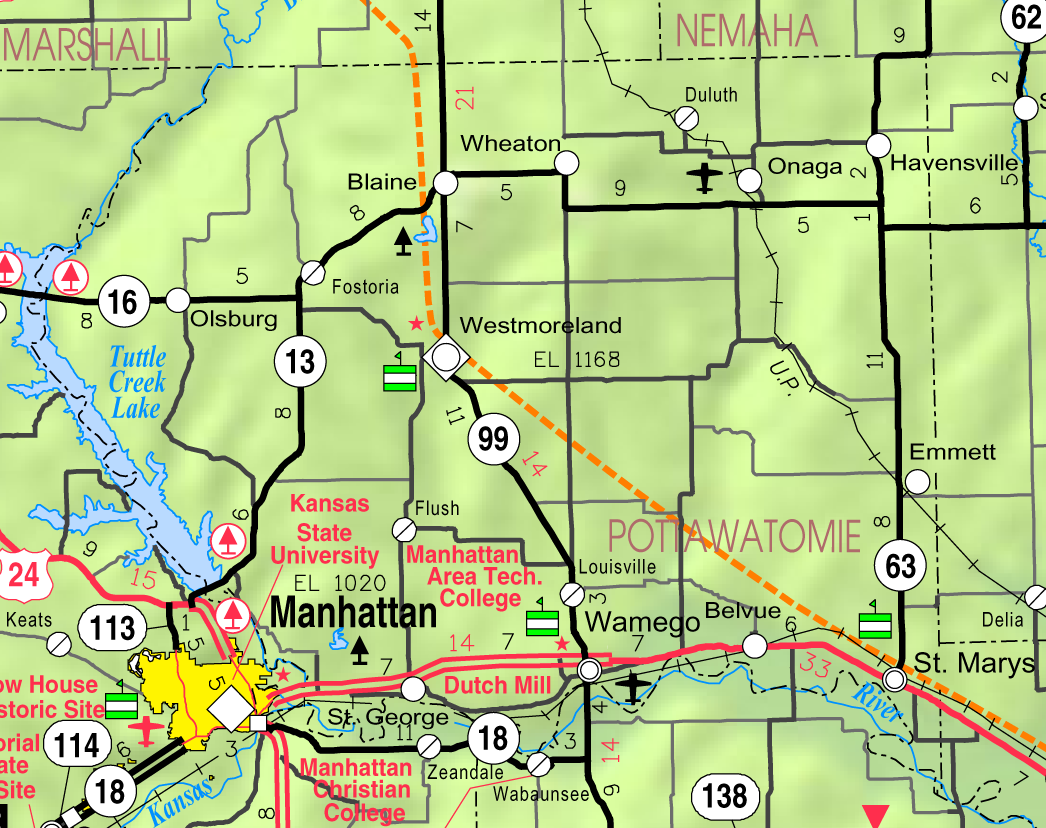
- KDOT map of Pottawatomie County (legend)
- Coordinates: 39°11′30″N 96°25′07″W
- Country: United States
- State: Kansas
- County: Pottawatomie
- Founded: 1857
- Incorporated: 1919

Government
  - Type: Mayor–Council
  - Mayor: Tim Pralle

Area
  - Total: 0.64 sq mi (1.67 km^{2})
  - Land: 0.64 sq mi (1.67 km^{2})
  - Water: 0 sq mi (0.00 km^{2})
- Elevation: 1,099 ft (335 m)

Population (2020)
  - Total: 1,054
  - Density: 1,630/sq mi (631/km^{2})
- Time zone: UTC-6 (CST)
  - Summer (DST): UTC-5 (CDT)
- ZIP Code: 66535
- Area code: 785
- FIPS code: 20-62200
- GNIS ID: 2396491
- Website: stgeorgeks.gov

St. George or Saint George is a city in Pottawatomie County, Kansas, United States. As of the 2020 census, the population of the city was 1,054. The name might have been intended to honor several pioneer settlers named George.

== History ==
St. George was platted in 1857. The town was moved about a mile in 1879 in order to be on the new railroad.

== Geography ==
According to the United States Census Bureau, the city has a total area of 0.69 square miles (1.79 km^{2}), of which 0.68 square miles (1.76 km^{2}) is land and 0.01 square miles (0.03 km^{2}) is water.

== Demographics ==
Historical population
Census	Pop.	Note	%±
1860	78		—
1870	118		51.3%
1880	206		74.6%
1920	211		—
1930	216		2.4%
1940	203		−6.0%
1950	251		23.6%
1960	259		3.2%
1970	241		−6.9%
1980	309		28.2%
1990	397		28.5%
2000	434		9.3%
2010	639		47.2%
2020	1,054		64.9%
U.S. Decennial Census

St. George is part of the Manhattan, Kansas Metropolitan Statistical Area.

=== 2010 census ===
As of the census of 2010, there were 639 people, 228 households, and 161 families residing in the city. The population density was 939.7 inhabitants per square mile (362.8/km^{2}). There were 255 housing units at an average density of 375.0 per square mile (144.8/km^{2}). The racial makeup of the city was 90.9% White, 0.3% African American, 1.4% Native American, 0.9% Asian, 1.4% from other races, and 5.0% from two or more races. Hispanic or Latino of any race were 5.8% of the population.

There were 228 households, of which 46.5% had children under the age of 18 living with them, 55.3% were married couples living together, 10.5% had a female householder with no husband present, 4.8% had a male householder with no wife present, and 29.4% were non-families. 24.6% of all households were made up of individuals, and 6.1% had someone living alone who was 65 years of age or older. The average household size was 2.80 and the average family size was 3.39.

The median age in the city was 30.2 years. 33.2% of residents were under the age of 18; 6.9% were between the ages of 18 and 24; 34.1% were from 25 to 44; 18% were from 45 to 64; and 7.7% were 65 years of age or older. The gender makeup of the city was 49.0% male and 51.0% female.

=== 2000 census ===
As of the census of 2000, there were 434 people, 173 households, and 106 families residing in the city. The population density was 987.3 inhabitants per square mile (381.2/km^{2}). There were 198 housing units at an average density of 450.4 per square mile (173.9/km^{2}). The racial makeup of the city was 97.47% White, 0.69% African American, 1.38% from other races, and 0.46% from two or more races. Hispanic or Latino of any race were 3.92% of the population.

There were 173 households, out of which 34.7% had children under the age of 18 living with them, 52.0% were married couples living together, 5.2% had a female householder with no husband present, and 38.2% were non-families. 28.3% of all households were made up of individuals, and 5.8% had someone living alone who was 65 years of age or older. The average household size was 2.51 and the average family size was 3.20.

In the city, the population was spread out, with 29.5% under the age of 18, 9.0% from 18 to 24, 33.2% from 25 to 44, 20.7% from 45 to 64, and 7.6% who were 65 years of age or older. The median age was 31 years. For every 100 females, there were 88.7 males. For every 100 females age 18 and over, there were 100.0 males.

The median income for a household in the city was $29,306, and the median income for a family was $34,250. Males had a median income of $22,159 versus $21,125 for females. The per capita income for the city was $15,544. About 14.4% of families and 23.6% of the population were below the poverty line, including 31.3% of those under age 18 and 20.0% of those age 65 or over.

== Government ==
The St. George government consists of a mayor and five council members. The council meets the 1st Thursday of each month at 7PM.

- City Hall, 205 First Street.

== Education ==
The community is served by Rock Creek USD 323 public school district, which was formed through school unification by consolidating St. George and Westmoreland schools. Rock Creek High School is located approximately halfway between the two communities, and its mascot is Rock Creek Mustangs. St. George Elementary is located in St. George.

St. George High School was closed through school unification in 1991. The St. George High School mascot was St. George Trojans.

== Notable people ==
- Wendell Hall, singer and songwriter.
