= Merv Leith =

Australian rules footballer

Personal information
- Full name: Mervyn Victor Leith
- Born: 21 July 1922; Adelaide, South Australia
- Died: 12 September 1987 (aged 65); Windsor, Victoria
- Original team: South Melbourne Districts
- Height: 174 cm (5 ft 9 in)
- Weight: 76 kg (168 lb)

Playing career^{1}
Years	Club	Games (Goals)
1943, 1946	South Melbourne	17 (10)
- ^{1} Playing statistics correct to the end of 1946.

Mervyn Victor Leith (21 July 1922 – 12 September 1987) was an Australian rules footballer who played with South Melbourne in the Victorian Football League (VFL).
