= Frank Wiziarde =

American actor and TV personality

Frank Oliver Wiziarde
- Born: Frank Oliver Wiziarde; July 25, 1916; Westmoreland, Kansas
- Died: September 11, 1987 (aged 71); Overland Park, Kansas
- Occupations: Actor and television personality
- Years active: 1953–1987, his death
- Spouse: Kitty Louise Handley (m. 1944)
- Children: 1
- Parent(s): Jack O. and Laura "Lulu" Baldwin Wiziarde

Frank Oliver Wiziarde (1916–1987) was an American actor and television personality who was known primarily for his performances as Whizzo the Clown in the Kansas-Missouri area from the 1950s through the 1980s (similar to Bozo the Clown).

== Career ==
Frank Wiziarde began performing in the "Wiziarde Trio," a circus act founded by his mother and father in the 1920s. The family called Westmoreland, Kansas home and opened a bakery and restaurant there as well during the period. Wiziarde performed on the rolling globe act with his mother and Mamie Scott and appeared as principal in the wire act.

In 1930, the Wiziarde family created the Wiziarde Novelty Circus, a traveling circus that appeared at stores and county fairs, in which Wiziarde performed until the act's disbanding at the end of the 1936 season, during the height of the Great Depression. After high school, Wiziarde went to Hollywood and appeared in a few films.

Between December 15, 1942, and December 8, 1946, Wiziarde served in the U.S. Army.

In 1947, Wiziarde became a radio announcer for KFEQ in St. Joseph, Missouri, where he became known for his man-on-the-street interviews.

He began his television career in 1953 in Kansas City, Missouri, working for KMBC-TV. The station wanted to produce a children's program, and Wiziarde came up with the idea for Whizzo, based on his experience performing as a clown for his parents' circus acts. His show went on the air in 1954. He switched stations several times going to KCMO-TV in Kansas City and then WIBW-TV in Topeka, but kept his character of Whizzo the Clown.

Whizzo's last show was on May 20, 1987. Wiziarde died of cancer on September 11 of that year.

== Film ==
His 1966 film Santa's Christmas Circus, features Wiziarde, with members of the Johnny Miller Dance Studio, taking the kids to the North Pole via magic carpet.

== Rediscovery ==
Santa's Christmas Circus was parodied by RiffTrax on December 22, 2016 alongside the short film The Christmas Tree.
