= Kerstin Bernadotte =

Swedish journalist and aristocrat

- Princess Bernadotte; Countess of Wisborg
- Born: Elin Kerstin Margareta Wijkmark; 4 October 1910; Stockholm, Sweden
- Died: 11 September 1987 (aged 76); Bastad, Sweden
- Spouse: Axel Erik Johnsson (m. 1935; div. 1936); Prince Carl Johan of Sweden, Duke of Dalarna (m. 1946)
- Issue: Monica Bernadotte; Christian Bernadotte
- House: Bernadotte (by marriage)
- Occupation: journalist

Elin Kerstin Margareta, Princess Bernadotte, Countess of Wisborg (née Wijkmark; (4 October 1910 – 11 September 1987) was a Swedish journalist, aristocrat and magazine editor. She was editor of the Swedish lifestyle and women's magazine Veckorevyn. Bernadotte was the wife of Prince Carl Johan of Sweden, who renounced his royal titles and rights of succession to the Swedish throne in order to marry her. She and her husband were later ennobled in the Grand Duchy of Luxembourg.

== Early life and career in journalism ==
Bernadotte was born to Henning Wijkmark and wife Elin Larsson (married 1902) in Stockholm in 1910. During her student years Kerstin Wijmark worked as a journalist, and she then subsequently became editor of the Swedish weekly magazine Veckorevyn (Weekly Review), which had been launched in 1935 by the Bonnier publishing house and had small initial sales, however under Wijkmark's editorship becoming more successful. Soon reaching a weekly circulation approaching 100,000 readers by 1940 circulation had exceeded 300,000 readers. Wijkmark achieved this by changing the previously family-focused magazine to concentrate more on fashion, recipes, and gossip columns. In 1935 she was married to Axel Erik Johnsson (1908–1953); the couple were divorced the following year.

== Marriage to Prince Carl and subsequent life ==
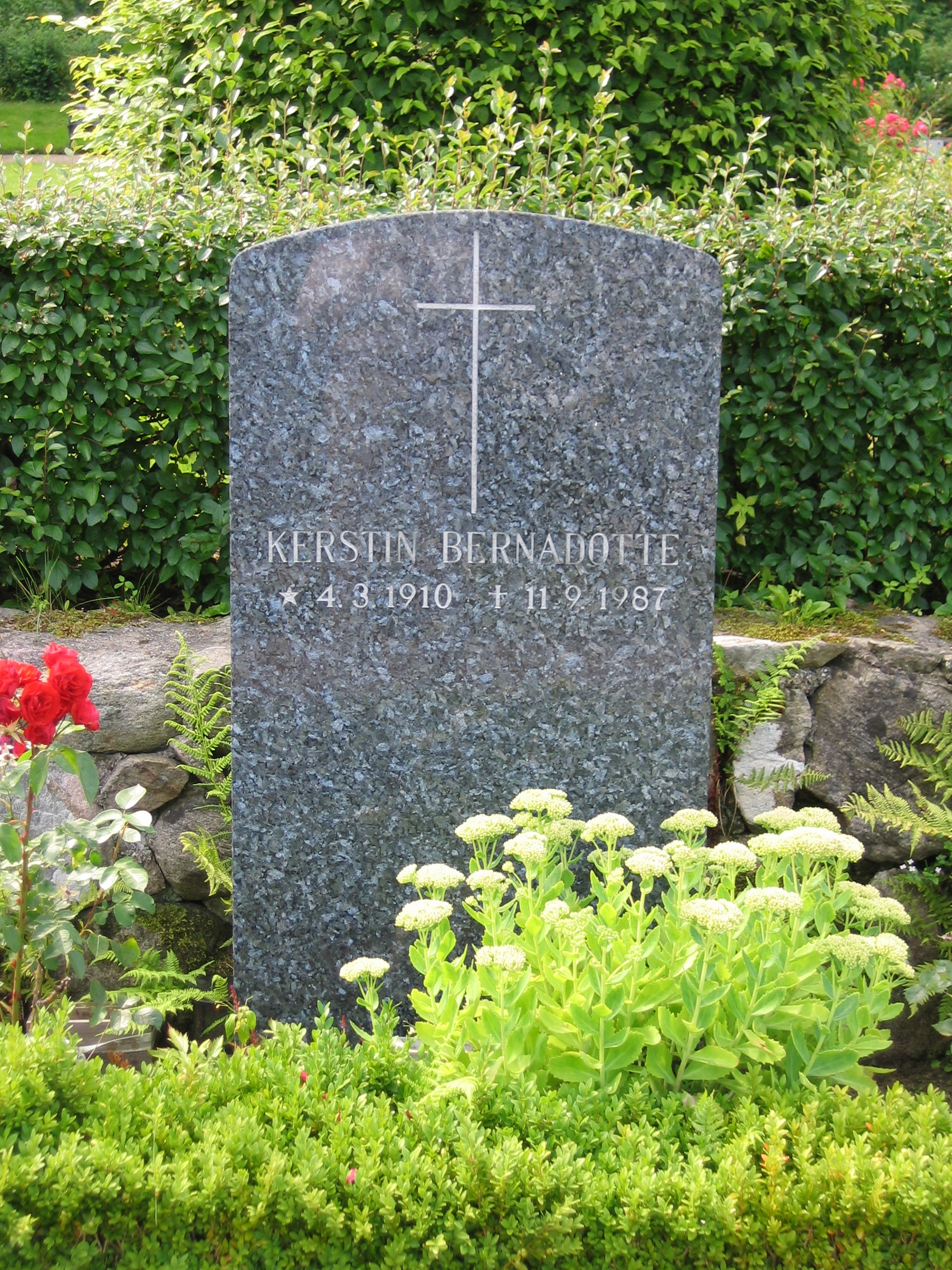
Bernadotte's grave in Båstad

In autumn 1939 Kerstin Wijkmark met Prince Carl Johan of Sweden at Cecil's restaurant in Stockholm. The couple subsequently began a relationship and lived together, but her status as a divorced commoner meant that requests by the prince to his grandfather, King Gustaf, to allow their marriage were denied. Carl Johan was told that marriage would mean a loss of his royal titles. A whispering campaign was started against the marriage, with Wijkmark accused of being "loose" and having alcohol problems. When the couple subsequently planned to emigrate to the United States court officials attempted to have Wijkmark's passport revoked, and then attempted to prevent her receiving a visa to enter the US. The couple were eventually married in New York in February 1946. Three days after they were married Prince Carl Johan had to renounce his claim to the Swedish throne, with the couple simply to be called Mr and Mrs Bernadotte in Sweden. They then lived for five years together in New York. In December 1948 she was taken to hospital suffering from a sleeping-pill overdose. In 1951 they adopted two children, Monica and Christian. In the same year the couple were given high titles of nobility in Luxembourg by Grand Duchess Charlotte (see Prince Bernadotte). The couple subsequently returned to Sweden and lived in Båstad.

While traveling on the French Riviera around the year 1950, the couple made the acquaintance of actress Greta Garbo, and they became close friends. However, when Bernadotte had an article published in Ladies' Home Journal in 1976 about Garbo, including photos that Bernadotte had taken of her, Garbo felt betrayed and never returned to Sweden.
