= Arun Kumar Choudhury =

Indian computer science professor (1923–1987)

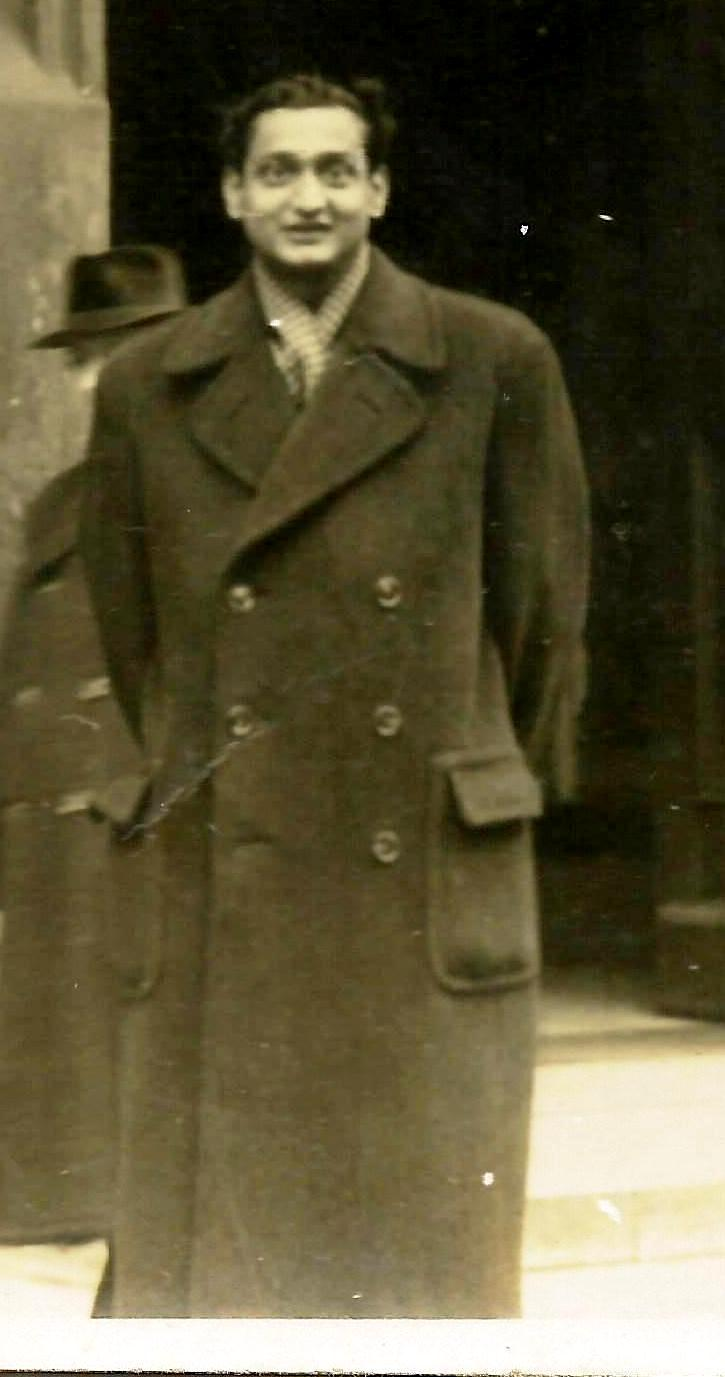
- Choudhury in 1958
- Born: 6 January 1923; Purnia, Bihar
- Died: 6 September 1987 (aged 64)
- Education: University of Calcutta, Rajabazar Science College, Patna University

Arun Kumar Choudhury (6 January 1923 – 6 September 1987) was the Indian founding head of the Department of Computer Science and Engineering at the University of Calcutta. He was a pioneer in both Analog and Digital Computing since the 1950s. A.K. Choudhury Memorial Lectures are arranged at various Indian Universities to celebrate his contributions.

== Career ==
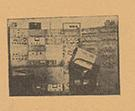
Analog computer developed by Choudhury

Choudhury was instrumental in building the first analog computer in India. He is best known for his work on optimization of Switching Circuits, High Threshold Logic, unate-cascade realizability and fault-tolerant synthesis of sequential machine.

A list of Choudhury's publications may be found here and here.

Each year, lectures on Computer Science are arranged in memory of Choudhury's achievements. The Information Technology College at Calcutta University is named after Choudhury.
