= A. R. Van Cleave =

American football coach

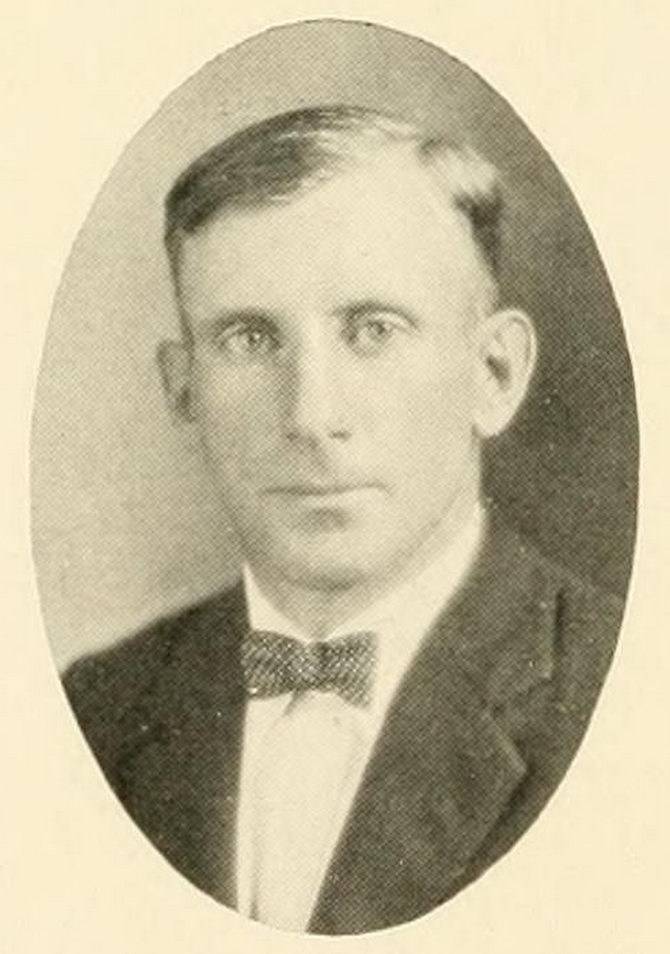
- Van Cleave pictured in Phi Psi Cli 1927, Elon yearbook

Biographical details
- Born: December 20, 1889; Farmersburg, Indiana, U.S.
- Died: September 24, 1987 (aged 97); Roanoke, Alabama, U.S.
- Education: Union Christian College, Indiana State University, Indiana University, University of Chicago

Coaching career (HC unless noted)
- 1926: Elon

Head coaching record
- Overall: 0–10

Albert Ray Van Cleave (December 20, 1889 – September 24, 1987) was an American football coach, professor, and college administrator. He was the head football coach at Elon University in Elon, North Carolina for the 1926 season, compiling a record of 0–10.

Van Cleave graduated from the Union Christian College in 1913, Indiana State Normal School in 1919, Indiana University Bloomington in 1921, and the University of Chicago in 1923. He served in the United States Army and became a private first class. He was also Professor of Philosophy at Elon during his time there. In 1943, he received an honorary degree from Elon. At the time he was President of Piedmont College in Georgia. He resigned in 1952.

Van Cleave died in Roanoke, Alabama in 1987. He was 97.

== Head coaching record ==
Year	Team	Overall	Conference	Standing	Bowl/playoffs
Elon Fightin' Christians (Independent) (1926)
1926	Elon	0–10			
Elon:		0–10			
Total:		0–10			
