= Roman Brandstaetter =

Author, writer, poet, playwright, translator (1906–1987)

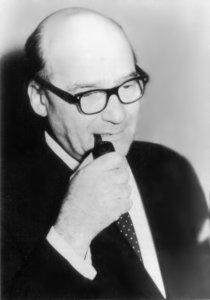
- Roman Brandstaetter
- Born: January 3, 1906; Tarnów, Poland
- Died: September 28, 1987 (aged 81); Poznań, Poland
- Occupations: Writer; poet; playwright; journalist; translator

Roman Brandstaetter (January 3, 1906 – September 28, 1987) was a Polish writer, poet, playwright, journalist and translator.

== Life and career ==
=== Early life: 1906–1940 ===
Brandstaetter was born in Tarnów, to a religious Jewish family, being the grandson of rabbi and writer Mordechai David Brandstaedter. Roman Brandstaetter graduated from the Jagiellonian University in Kraków with a degree in philosophy and Polish and taught in a Jewish high school in Warsaw.

Beginning in 1927, Brandstaetter published poetry and critical essays in the publications "Chwila" and "Nowy Dziennik". In 1928, he published his first volume of poetry, titled Jarzma ("Yokes"). He wrote exclusively in Polish and actively participated in literary discussions, and was also interested in history. A particular focus for him was the problem of assimilation, which in the Polish context took on additional dimensions and meaning. In his work Tragedie Juliana Klaczki ("The Tragedy of Julian Klaczko") (1933), for example, he described the fate of assimilated Jews in Poland during the partitions. His study titled Legion żydowski Adama Mickiewicza ("Adam Mickiewicz's Jewish Legion") (1932) stirred a great controversy; in it, he depicted the great Polish Romantic poet 's initiative as being the precursor to the Zionist program, and as a result was criticized by Tadeusz Boy-Żeleński, among others.

In 1933–1935, Brandstaetter was the director of the literary section of a Zionist Polish-language publication called "Opinia", in which he published his programmatic article "Sprawa poezji polsko-żydowskiej" ("The Problem of Polish-Jewish Poetry") (1933). This text remains one of the most important analyses regarding this topic. It launched a discussion about Polish Jewish poets writing in Polish who, according to Brandstaetter, "breathed [...] the Jewish national spirit into the Polish language of poetry".

Brandstaetter published the following volumes of poetry: Droga pod górę ("Uphill Road") (1931), Węzły i miecze ("Knots and Swords") (1932), Królestwo trzeciej świątyni ("Kingdom of the Third Temple") (1933) and Jerozolima światła i mroku ("Jerusalem of Light and Darkness") (1935). During the interwar period [1918–1939], they became a pretext for vicious anti-Semitic attacks on their author. The poet's reaction was a brilliant essay titled Zmowa eunuchów ("Conspiracy of the Eunuchs") (1936).

=== Move to Palestine: 1940–1946 ===
After the start of the Second World War, Brandstaetter was in Vilnius. In 1940, he left that city, and through Moscow, Baku and Iran went to the Middle East; in Palestine, he worked for the Polish Telegraph Agency. This was an unusual period for him in many respects: though he decided to convert to Christianity at that time, it must be emphasized that he never abandoned Jewish traditions, something which he himself often stressed.

=== In exile: 1946–1948 ===
In 1946, Brandstaetter left Palestine for Rome, where he served as cultural attaché at the Polish embassy and was baptized. During his stay in Rome, Roman Brandstaetter married Regina Wiktor. It must be emphasized that he never abandoned his Jewish roots or background, something he often spoke about and was very proud of.

=== Return to Poland: 1948–1987 ===
In 1948, he returned to Poland, where he settled in Poznań. After the war, he wrote, among other things, the following works: a poetry anthology titled Słowo nad słowami ("The Word Over Words") (1964); Cztery poematy biblijne ("Four Biblical Poems") (1972); and a four-part novel titled Jezus z Nazaretu ("Jesus of Nazareth") (1967–1973). As the titles themselves suggest, these works address Biblical themes, interpreted in the context of one individual's experience, which join two different traditions. An excellent example of this is also his biographical novel, Krąg biblijny ("Bible Study Group") (1975). He also draws on the tradition of Chasidic parables, apparent in his work Inne kwiatki świętego Franciszka z Asyżu ("Other Little Flowers of St. Francis of Assisi") (1976).

Brandstaetter also wrote historical plays, such as Powrót syna marnotrawnego ("Return of the Prodigal Son") (1944), a play based on Rembrandt's biography; Noce narodowe ("Nights of the Nation") (1946–1948), Znaki wolności ("Signs of Freedom") (1953), Marchołt (1954), and Teatr świętego Franciszka ("Theater of St. Francis") (before 1958). His story Ja jestem Żyd z 'Wesela' ("I am the Jew from 'Wesele' ") (1972; 1981) attracted much attention. The work was a literary dialogue with the text of one of the greatest Polish plays by Stanisław Wyspiański, Wesele ("The Wedding"). Brandstaetter's story was adapted for radio, theater and television. Roman Brandstaetter also translated works from Hebrew, including Psalter (1968), German, English (Shakespeare's works), French, Dutch and Czech.

He also wrote extensively for the Polish Catholic press, including the Catholic weekly magazine, Tygodnik Powszechny, consolidating his reputation as one of Poland’s leading religious writers.

=== Death ===
Brandstaetter died in Poznań on September 28, 1987, of a heart attack. He was buried next to his wife Regina, née Brochwicz-Wiktor (who died a year earlier) in the Milostowo Cemetery in Poznań.

== Legacy ==
Brandstaetter’s biography reflects the dramatic experiences and radical ideological choices facing twentieth-century Jewish intelligentsia. His life was shaped by Zionism and, later, Catholicism, while his literary output synthesized Jewish, Polish, Christian, and Greek and Roman traditions. His program for Polish Jewish literature called on writers to serve the cause of Zionism, while his interwar poetry relied on classical poetics to address universal and national Jewish themes, especially biblical ones. Cross-fertilization between Judaism and Christianity is central to Brandstaetter’s postwar works, including his best-known novel, Jezus z Nazarethu—an epic about Christ written in biblical style, exegetic in approach. The figure of Christ, shown against the background of first-century Palestine, is presented in historical context, while the Gospels are interpreted as continuing the tradition of the Old Testament. The novel’s language is rooted in biblical imagery, symbols, and parables, and uses biblical literary techniques.

Critics have praised Brandstaetter’s lyric poetry for its function of “hermeneutics of the Judeo-Christian tradition,” as Wojciech Gutowski has termed it, while autobiographical works portray the writer as a bicultural artist, scion of a family rooted in Haskalah. His grandfather, the writer Mordekhai Brandstetter (1844–1928), often appears in Roman Brandstaetter’s work offering insights into values underlying Jewish life.
