= Dixon House =

Dixon House may refer to:

== Places in the United States ==
(by state then city)

- Dixon–Markle House, Aspen, Colorado, listed on the National Register of Historic Places in Pitkin County, Colorado
- S. P. Dixon Farm, Newark, Delaware, listed on the National Register of Historic Places in New Castle County, Delaware
- James Dixon House, Milford, Kansas, listed on the National Register of Historic Places in Geary County, Kansas
- Dixon House (Prairieville, Louisiana), listed on the National Register of Historic Places in Ascension Parish, Louisiana
- Dixon Building, Natchez, Mississippi, listed on the National Register of Historic Places in Adams County, Mississippi
- Dixon-Duncan Block, Missoula, Montana, listed on the National Register of Historic Places in Missoula County, Montana
- Dixon House (Poughkeepsie, New York), listed on the NRHP in Dutchess County, New York
- James Dixon Farm, Boonton, New Jersey, listed on the National Register of Historic Places in Morris County, New Jersey
- Dixon-Leftwich-Murphy House, Greensboro, North Carolina, listed on the National Register of Historic Places in Guilford County, North Carolina
- Dixon Hall Apartments, Cleveland, Ohio, listed on the National Register of Historic Places in Cleveland, Ohio
- Dixon-Globe Opera House-Robinson-Schwenn Building, Hamilton, Ohio, listed on the National Register of Historic Places in Butler County, Ohio
- Dixon-Moore House, Dallas, Texas, listed on the National Register of Historic Places in Dallas County, Texas
- Christopher F. Dixon, Jr., House, Payson, Utah, listed on the National Register of Historic Places in Utah County, Utah
- John Dixon House, Payson, Utah, listed on the National Register of Historic Places in Utah County, Utah
- Maynard and Edith Hamlin Dixon House and Studio, Mt. Carmel, Utah, listed on the National Register of Historic Places in Kane County, Utah
- Dixon (Shacklefords, Virginia), listed on the National Register of Historic Places in King and Queen County, Virginia

== Other ==
- Dixon Building, in Toronto, Ontario, Canada
- Dixon House Band, a prog-rock/pop group based in Seattle in the late 1970s
- E. Dixon House (born 1950), Musician, singer, songwriter, composer
