= National Register of Historic Places listings in Geary County, Kansas =

Location of Geary County in Kansas

This is a list of the National Register of Historic Places listings in Geary County, Kansas.

This is intended to be a complete list of the properties and districts on the National Register of Historic Places in Geary County, Kansas, United States. The locations of National Register properties and districts for which the latitude and longitude coordinates are included below, may be seen in a map.

There are 16 properties and districts listed on the National Register in the county.

This National Park Service list is complete through NPS recent listings posted May 1, 2026.

== Current listings ==
	Name on the Register	Image	Date listed	Location	City or town	Description
1	Bartell House	Bartell House	December 1, 1980 (#80001466)	6th and Washington Sts. 39°01′42″N 96°49′47″W	Junction City	
2	Bogan Archeological Site		May 17, 1973 (#73000756)	Address restricted	Junction City	
3	George T. Brown House	George T. Brown House	December 27, 2006 (#06001167)	222 S. Jefferson St. 39°01′16″N 96°49′55″W	Junction City	
4	Conroe Bridge	Conroe Bridge	March 10, 1983 (#83000427)	East of Junction City; 39°02′56″N 96°43′51″W	Junction City	
5	James Dixon House	James Dixon House	April 1, 1998 (#98000265)	8715 Old Highway 77; 39°06′10″N 96°51′00″W	Milford	Italianate, limestone house completed in 1880. Known also as Military View Farm, it overlooks Fort Riley.
6	Elliott Village Site		December 8, 1978 (#78001280)	Right bank of McDowell Creek south of McDowell Creek Road, east of Junction City; 39°02′08″N 96°36′52″W	Junction City	
7	First Presbyterian Church of Junction City	First Presbyterian Church of Junction City	October 4, 2021 (#100007028)	113 West 5th St. 39°01′38″N 96°49′49″W	Junction City	
8	First Territorial Capitol	First Territorial Capitol	December 2, 1970 (#70000249)	Along K-18 on the Fort Riley Military Reservation; 39°05′05″N 96°45′42″W	Fort Riley	
9	Grand Army of the Republic (GAR) Memorial Arch	Grand Army of the Republic (GAR) Memorial Arch	January 11, 2017 (#100000512)	500 N. Washington St. 39°01′41″N 96°49′47″W	Junction City	
10	Jackson-McConnell House	Jackson-McConnell House	April 16, 2012 (#12000204)	228 W. 5th St. 39°01′38″N 96°49′55″W	Junction City	
11	Junction City Downtown Historic District	Junction City Downtown Historic District	July 19, 2006 (#06000623)	Roughly both sides of Washington Ave., from 6th to 9th Sts. 39°01′55″N 96°49′47″W	Junction City	
12	Leithoff-Powers Ranch Historic District	Leithoff-Powers Ranch Historic District	July 28, 1995 (#95000946)	K-57 southeast of Junction City; 38°59′11″N 96°42′59″W	Junction City	
13	Lyon Creek Rainbow Arch	Lyon Creek Rainbow Arch	December 22, 2020 (#100005949)	100 ft. southwest from the jct. of Lyon Creek Rd. & Hwy. K-157 Spur; 38°53′05″N 96°54′36″W	Wreford	
14	Main Post Area, Fort Riley	Main Post Area, Fort Riley	May 1, 1974 (#74000837)	Northeast of Junction City on K-18; 39°04′07″N 96°46′53″W	Fort Riley	
15	Old Junction City High School	Old Junction City High School	April 24, 1981 (#81000278)	Adams and 6th Sts. 39°01′40″N 96°50′01″W	Junction City	
16	Old Katy Bridge	Old Katy Bridge	May 9, 2003 (#03000370)	Otter Creek Rd., 0.4 miles (0.64 km) south of its intersection with Lyons Creek Rd. and 0.5 miles (0.80 km) southeast of Wreford; 38°57′18″N 96°50′46″W	Wreford	
17	Christian Wetzel Cabin	Christian Wetzel Cabin	October 15, 1973 (#73000757)	Intersection of Spring Valley Rd and Highway K-18; 39°01′46″N 96°52′19″W	Junction City	

== See also ==
- List of National Historic Landmarks in Kansas
- National Register of Historic Places listings in Kansas
