= Junction City High School =

Junction City High School may refer to:

- Junction City High School (Arkansas), Junction City, Arkansas
- Junction City High School (Oregon), Junction City, Oregon
- Junction City High School (Kansas), Junction City, Kansas
- Old Junction City High School, a historic building listed on the National Register of Historic Places in Junction City, Kansas
