= Broughton, Kansas =

- Ghost town
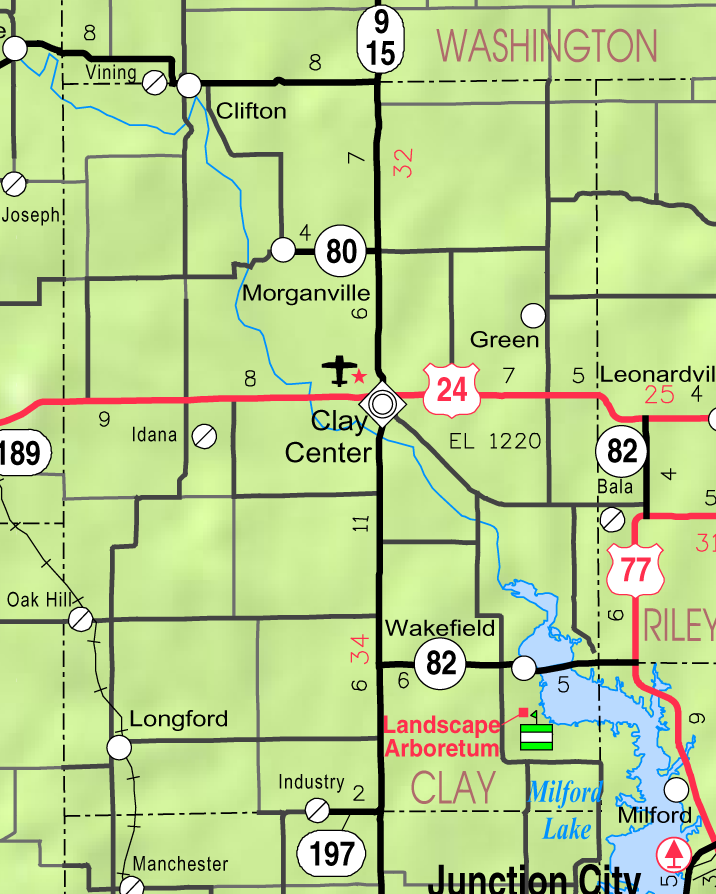
- KDOT map of Clay County (legend)

- Location within Kansas Location within the United States
- Coordinates: 39°19′17″N 97°3′12″W
- Country: United States
- State: Kansas
- County: Clay
- Founded: 1869
- Elevation: 1,184 ft (361 m)

Population
  - Total: 0
- Time zone: UTC-6 (CST)
  - Summer (DST): UTC-5 (CDT)
- Area code: 785
- FIPS code: 20-08625
- GNIS ID: 476188

Broughton is a ghost town in Clay County, Kansas, United States. It is located a few miles southeast of Clay Center.

== History ==
Broughton was founded in 1869. It was razed in 1966 during the construction of Milford Lake, along with Alida, while the cities of Wakefield and Milford were moved to higher ground.
