= Alida, Kansas =

Ghost town in Geary County, Kansas

- Ghost town
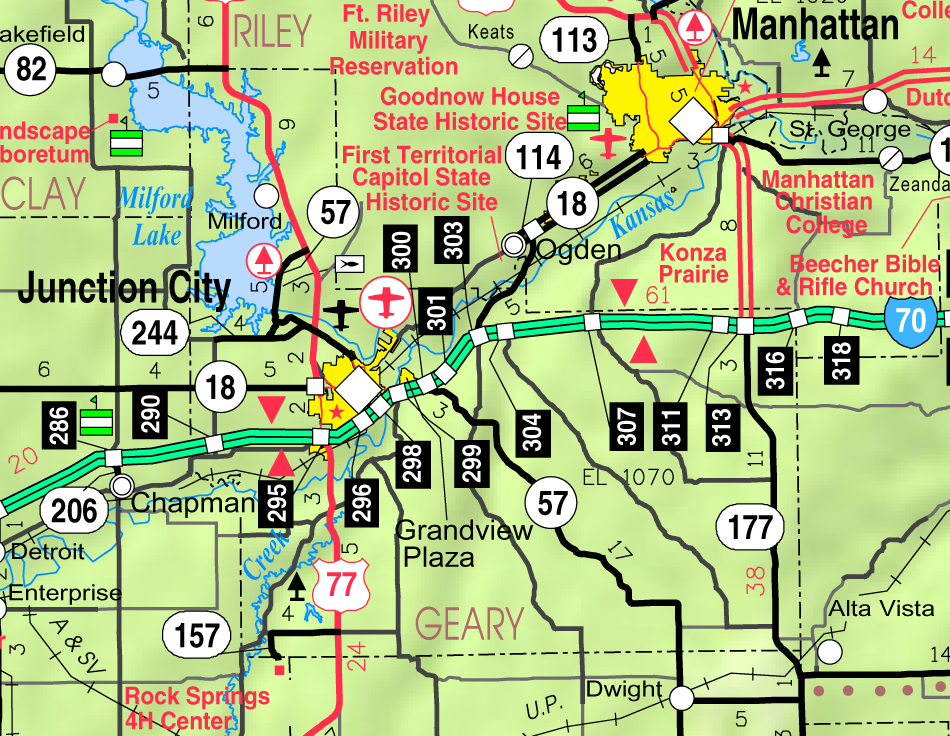
- KDOT map of Geary County (legend)

- Location within Kansas Location within the United States
- Coordinates: 39°5′45″N 96°56′25″W
- Country: United States
- State: Kansas
- County: Geary
- Founded: 1858
- Elevation: 1,142 ft (348 m)

Population
  - Total: 0
- Time zone: UTC-6 (CST)
  - Summer (DST): UTC-5 (CDT)
- Area code: 785
- FIPS code: 20-01200
- GNIS ID: 476498

Alida is a ghost town in Smoky Hill township of Geary County, Kansas, United States.

== History ==
Alida was founded in 1858. It was razed in 1966-1967 during the construction of Milford Lake. The communities of Alida and Broughton were razed, while the cities of Wakefield and Milford were moved to higher ground. The population in 1910 was 48.
