= DJ Giddens =

American football player (born 2003)

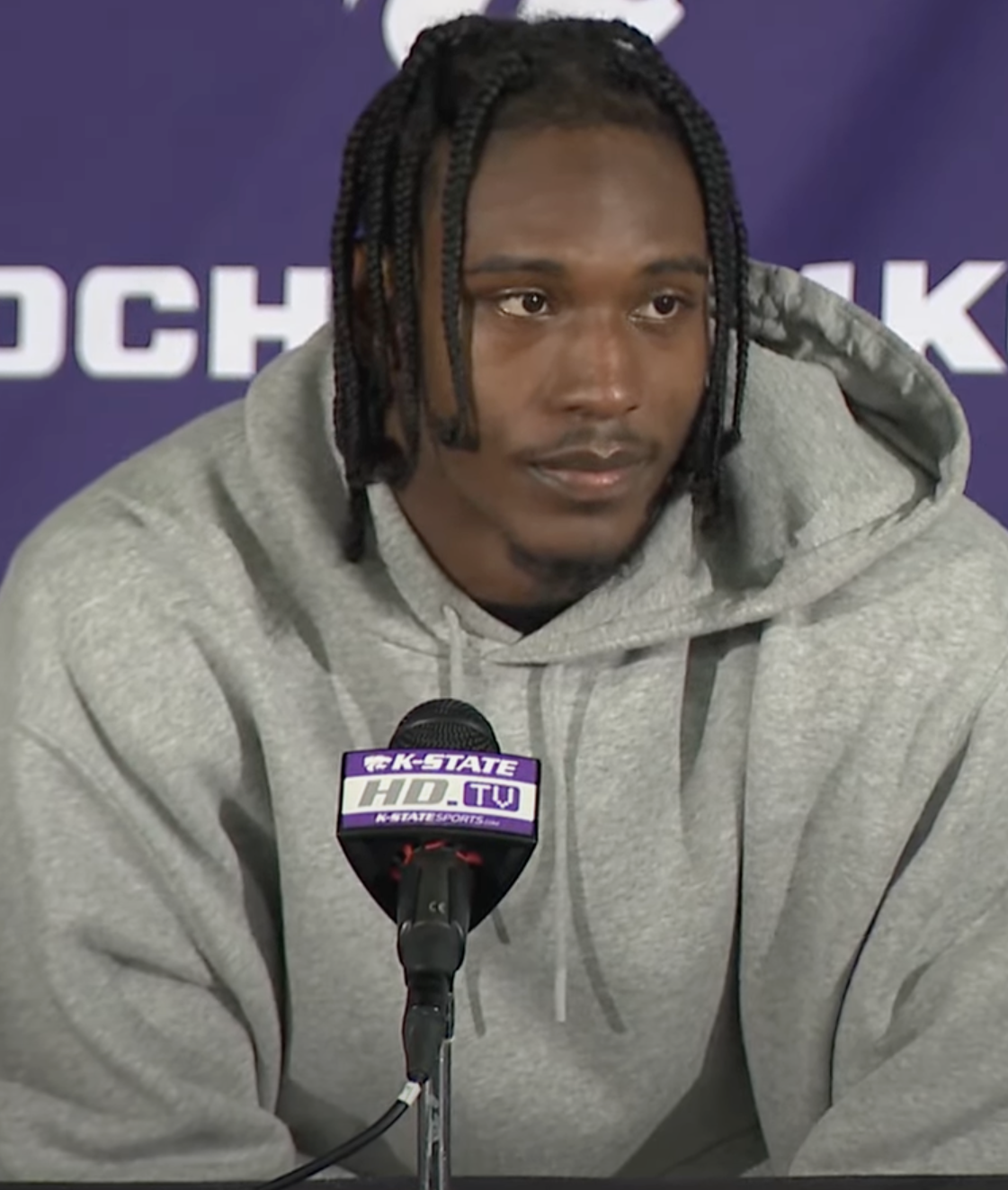
- Giddens in 2024

No. 21 – Indianapolis Colts
- Position: Running back
- Roster status: Active

Personal information
- Born: August 26, 2003 (age 23)
- Listed height: 6 ft 0 in (1.83 m)
- Listed weight: 212 lb (96 kg)

Career information
- High school: Junction City (Junction City, Kansas)
- College: Kansas State (2022–2024)
- NFL draft: 2025: 5th round, 151st overall pick

Career history
- Indianapolis Colts (2025–present)
- Stats at Pro Football Reference

DJ Giddens (born August 26, 2003) is an American professional football running back for the Indianapolis Colts of the National Football League (NFL). He played college football for the Kansas State Wildcats and was selected by the Colts in the fifth round of the 2025 NFL draft.

== Early life ==
Giddens attended Junction City High School in Junction City, Kansas where he was a multi-sport athlete, only playing football his freshman and senior year. He also went to state for track where his 4x1 team broke the school record in 2018 when he was just a sophomore. During his senior year in high school he had 1,912 rushing yards and 34 touchdowns. He committed to Kansas State University to play college football.

== College career ==
As a redshirt freshman at Kansas State in 2022, Giddens played in all 14 games as Deuce Vaughn's backup and rushed for 518 yards on 89 carries with six touchdowns. He entered 2023 sharing time with Treshaun Ward. In the fourth game of the year against UCF, Giddens had 207 rushing yards and 293 yards overall with four touchdowns.

=== College statistics ===
Year	Team	Games		Rushing				Receiving			
Year	Team	GP	GS	Att	Yards	Avg	TD	Rec	Yards	Avg	TD
2022	Kansas State	14	0	89	518	5.8	6	8	98	12.3	0
2023	Kansas State	13	13	223	1,226	5.5	10	29	323	11.1	3
2024	Kansas State	12	12	205	1,343	6.6	7	21	258	12.3	1
Career		39	25	517	3,087	6.0	23	58	679	11.7	4

== Professional career ==
Pre-draft measurables
Height	Weight	Arm length	Hand span	Wingspan	40-yard dash	10-yard split	20-yard split	20-yard shuttle	Three-cone drill	Vertical jump	Broad jump
6 ft 0 1/4 in (1.84 m)	212 lb (96 kg)	30 3/8 in (0.77 m)	9 1/4 in (0.23 m)	6 ft 3 1/4 in (1.91 m)	4.43 s	1.53 s	2.54 s	4.33 s	7.19 s	39.5 in (1.00 m)	10 ft 10 in (3.30 m)
All values from NFL Combine/Pro Day

The Indianapolis Colts selected Giddens in the fifth round (151st overall) of the 2025 NFL draft. He signed a four-year contract with the Colts on May 9, 2025.
