= Milford Township, Kansas =

Milford Township
- Township
- Location in Geary County
- Coordinates: 39°08′30″N 096°54′31″W
- Country: United States
- State: Kansas
- County: Geary

Area
  - Total: 49.47 sq mi (128.13 km^{2})
  - Land: 38.8 sq mi (100.6 km^{2})
  - Water: 10.63 sq mi (27.53 km^{2}) 21.49%
- Elevation: 1,145 ft (349 m)

Population (2020)
  - Total: 1,698
  - Density: 43.72/sq mi (16.88/km^{2})
- GNIS feature ID: 0476328

Milford Township is a township in Geary County, Kansas, United States. As of the 2020 census, its population was 1,698.

== Geography ==
Milford Township covers an area of 49.47 square miles (128.1 km^{2}) and contains one incorporated settlement, Milford. According to the USGS, it contains three cemeteries: Barry, Branscom and Milford.

The streams of Dixon Creek, Farnum Creek, Madison Creek and Rush Creek run through this township.
