= Dixon Building =

Dixon Building may refer to:

- Dixon Building (Natchez, Mississippi), listed on the National Register of Historic Places in Adams County, Mississippi
- The Dixon Building (number 49), part of the Dixon and Griffiths Buildings in Toronto, Canada
- Dixon Hall Apartments, listed on the National Register of Historic Places in Cleveland, Ohio
- Dixon-Duncan Block in Missoula, Montana, listed on the National Register of Historic Places in Missoula County, Montana
- Dixon Mills, a residential building complex in Jersey City, New Jersey
