= Geary County, Kansas =

County in Kansas, United States

- County
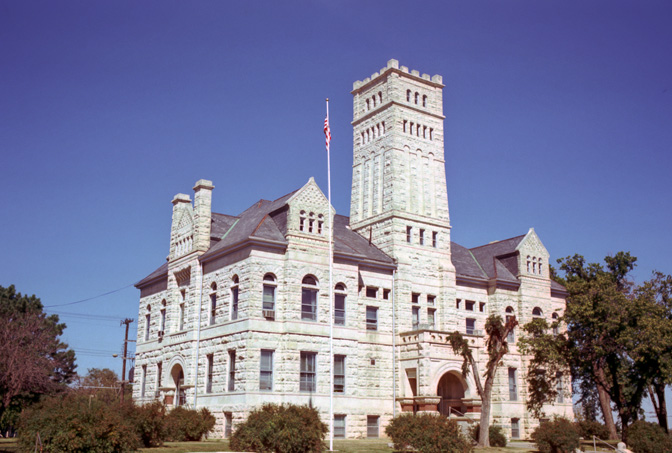
- Geary County Courthouse in Junction City (1979)

- Location within the U.S. state of Kansas
- Coordinates: 38°54′31″N 96°45′08″W
- Country: United States
- State: Kansas
- Founded: 1855
- Named for: John W. Geary
- Seat: Junction City
- Largest city: Junction City

Area
  - Total: 404 sq mi (1,050 km^{2})
  - Land: 385 sq mi (1,000 km^{2})
  - Water: 20 sq mi (52 km^{2}) 4.9%

Population (2020)
  - Total: 36,739
  - Estimate (2025): 36,338 ▼
  - Density: 95.4/sq mi (36.8/km^{2})
- Time zone: UTC−6 (Central)
  - Summer (DST): UTC−5 (CDT)
- Congressional district: 2nd
- Website: www.gearycounty.gov

Geary County is a county located in the U.S. state of Kansas. Its county seat and most populous city is Junction City. As of the 2020 census, the county population was 36,739. The county is named in honor of John W. Geary, the first mayor of San Francisco, a governor of the Kansas Territory, and the 16th governor of Pennsylvania.

== History ==
=== Early history ===
For many millennia, the Great Plains of North America was inhabited by nomadic Native Americans. From the 16th century to 18th century, the Kingdom of France claimed ownership of large parts of North America. In 1762, after the French and Indian War, France secretly ceded New France to Spain, per the Treaty of Fontainebleau.

=== 19th century ===
In 1802, Spain returned most of the land to France, but keeping title to about 7,500 square miles. In 1803, most of the land for modern-day Kansas was acquired by the United States from France as part of the 828,000 square mile Louisiana Purchase for 2.83 cents per acre.

In 1854, the Kansas Territory was organized, then in 1861 Kansas became the 34th U.S. state. Geary County was formed on August 30, 1855, as an original county from open, free territory. It was among the first 33 counties established by the territory government.

Geary County was originally named Davis County in 1855 after Jefferson Davis (then the United States Secretary of War). During the American Civil War, when Davis became president of the Confederacy, attempts were made to change the county's name, but both failed. Federal and state census records show it as Davis County from 1860 through 1885. In 1888 the county was renamed in honor of John W. Geary, an early Governor of the Kansas Territory.

== Geography ==
According to the U.S. Census Bureau, the county has a total area of 404 square miles (1,050 km^{2}), of which 385 square miles (1,000 km^{2}) is land and 20 square miles (52 km^{2}) (4.9%) is water. It is the second-smallest county in Kansas by land area and third-smallest by total area.

=== Adjacent counties ===
- Riley County (north)
- Wabaunsee County (east)
- Morris County (south)
- Dickinson County (west)
- Clay County (northwest)

== Demographics ==
Historical population
Census	Pop.	Note	%±
1860	1,163		—
1870	5,526		375.2%
1880	6,994		26.6%
1890	10,428		49.1%
1900	10,744		3.0%
1910	12,681		18.0%
1920	13,452		6.1%
1930	14,366		6.8%
1940	15,222		6.0%
1950	21,671		42.4%
1960	28,779		32.8%
1970	28,111		−2.3%
1980	29,852		6.2%
1990	30,453		2.0%
2000	27,947		−8.2%
2010	34,362		23.0%
2020	36,739		6.9%
2025 (est.)	36,338	▼	−1.1%
U.S. Decennial Census; 1790–1960 1900–1990; 1990–2000 2010–2020

Geary County is part of the Manhattan, KS Metropolitan Statistical Area.

=== Racial and ethnic composition ===
Geary County, Kansas – Racial and ethnic composition Note: the US Census treats Hispanic/Latino as an ethnic category. This table excludes Latinos from the racial categories and assigns them to a separate category. Hispanics/Latinos may be of any race.
Race / Ethnicity (NH = Non-Hispanic)	Pop 1980	Pop 1990	Pop 2000	Pop 2010	Pop 2020	% 1980	% 1990	% 2000	% 2010	% 2020
White alone (NH)	21,063	20,213	17,187	20,587	19,957	70.56%	66.37%	61.50%	59.91%	54.32%
Black or African American alone (NH)	5,623	6,982	6,007	6,015	6,062	18.84%	22.93%	21.49%	17.50%	16.50%
Native American or Alaska Native alone (NH)	158	184	187	277	207	0.53%	0.60%	0.67%	0.81%	0.56%
Asian alone (NH)	1,053	1,170	856	1,069	1,183	3.53%	3.84%	3.06%	3.11%	3.22%
Native Hawaiian or Pacific Islander alone (NH)	x	x	112	253	452	x	x	0.40%	0.74%	1.23%
Other race alone (NH)	190	51	76	68	189	0.64%	0.17%	0.27%	0.20%	0.51%
Mixed race or Multiracial (NH)	x	x	1,160	1,841	2,913	x	x	4.15%	5.36%	7.93%
Hispanic or Latino (any race)	1,765	1,853	2,362	4,252	5,776	5.91%	6.08%	8.45%	12.37%	15.72%
Total	29,852	30,453	27,947	34,362	36,739	100.00%	100.00%	100.00%	100.00%	100.00%

=== 2020 census ===
As of the 2020 census, the county had a population of 36,739. The median age was 28.7 years, 29.3% of residents were under the age of 18, and 9.3% of residents were 65 years of age or older. For every 100 females there were 102.7 males, and for every 100 females age 18 and over there were 100.3 males age 18 and over.

About 88.4% of residents lived in urban areas, while 11.6% lived in rural areas.

The racial makeup of the county was 59.5% White, 17.2% Black or African American, 0.9% American Indian and Alaska Native, 3.4% Asian, 1.2% Native Hawaiian and Pacific Islander, 4.6% from some other race, and 13.2% from two or more races. Hispanic or Latino residents of any race comprised 15.7% of the population.

There were 13,488 households in the county, of which 40.3% had children under the age of 18 living with them and 22.4% had a female householder with no spouse or partner present. About 25.1% of all households were made up of individuals and 7.0% had someone living alone who was 65 years of age or older.

There were 15,928 housing units, of which 15.3% were vacant. Among occupied housing units, 42.8% were owner-occupied and 57.2% were renter-occupied. The homeowner vacancy rate was 3.8% and the rental vacancy rate was 16.2%.

=== 2000 census ===
As of the 2000 census, there were 27,947 people, 10,458 households, and 7,582 families residing in the county. The population density was 73 inhabitants per square mile (28/km^{2}). There were 11,959 housing units at an average density of 31 per square mile (12/km^{2}). The racial makeup of the county was 64.13% White, 22.03% Black or African American, 0.75% Native American, 3.16% Asian, 0.41% Pacific Islander, 4.10% from other races, and 5.41% from two or more races. Hispanic or Latino of any race were 8.45% of the population.

There were 10,458 households, out of which 39.60% had children under the age of 18 living with them, 56.90% were married couples living together, 12.30% had a female householder with no husband present, and 27.50% were non-families. 22.50% of all households were made up of individuals, and 7.80% had someone living alone who was 65 years of age or older. The average household size was 2.61 and the average family size was 3.07.

In the county, the population was spread out, with 29.60% under the age of 18, 13.60% from 18 to 24, 30.00% from 25 to 44, 17.40% from 45 to 64, and 9.40% who were 65 years of age or older. The median age was 29 years. For every 100 females, there were 97.30 males. For every 100 females age 18 and over, there were 94.30 males.

The median income for a household in the county was $31,917, and the median income for a family was $36,372. Males had a median income of $25,942 versus $21,389 for females. The per capita income for the county was $16,199. About 9.70% of families and 12.10% of the population were below the poverty line, including 16.80% of those under age 18 and 9.90% of those age 65 or over.

== Government ==
=== Presidential elections ===
For most of its history, Geary County has been dominated by the Republican Party. The party's presidential candidates have failed to win the county only seven times from 1880 to the present day, the last of these occurring in 1964. Since the 2000 election, the results have been remarkably consistent: the Republican candidate has received between 54 and 58% of the vote each time, with the exception of 2004, when George W. Bush won the county with 64%.

Presidential election results

United States presidential election results for Geary County, Kansas
Year	Republican		Democratic		Third party(ies)	
Year	No.	%	No.	%	No.	%
1888	1,027	54.34%	756	40.00%	107	5.66%
1892	863	42.72%	0	0.00%	1,157	57.28%
1896	1,051	46.75%	1,171	52.09%	26	1.16%
1900	1,240	54.55%	1,009	44.39%	24	1.06%
1904	1,431	67.88%	591	28.04%	86	4.08%
1908	1,257	53.38%	1,033	43.86%	65	2.76%
1912	387	17.39%	800	35.94%	1,039	46.68%
1916	1,731	48.20%	1,740	48.45%	120	3.34%
1920	2,404	69.56%	962	27.84%	90	2.60%
1924	2,678	66.34%	723	17.91%	636	15.75%
1928	2,746	69.15%	1,203	30.29%	22	0.55%
1932	1,957	40.92%	2,705	56.55%	121	2.53%
1936	2,382	44.38%	2,973	55.39%	12	0.22%
1940	2,840	52.65%	2,504	46.42%	50	0.93%
1944	2,833	56.97%	2,107	42.37%	33	0.66%
1948	2,864	49.72%	2,810	48.78%	86	1.49%
1952	4,314	70.54%	1,750	28.61%	52	0.85%
1956	4,013	65.54%	2,078	33.94%	32	0.52%
1960	3,789	61.28%	2,365	38.25%	29	0.47%
1964	2,259	39.32%	3,419	59.51%	67	1.17%
1968	2,954	50.70%	2,228	38.24%	645	11.07%
1972	4,299	70.02%	1,708	27.82%	133	2.17%
1976	3,230	52.13%	2,843	45.88%	123	1.99%
1980	3,534	56.06%	2,357	37.39%	413	6.55%
1984	4,464	65.44%	2,296	33.66%	61	0.89%
1988	3,782	57.54%	2,721	41.40%	70	1.06%
1992	2,928	38.75%	2,559	33.87%	2,069	27.38%
1996	3,686	54.29%	2,444	35.99%	660	9.72%
2000	3,977	57.92%	2,660	38.74%	229	3.34%
2004	4,703	64.18%	2,531	34.54%	94	1.28%
2008	4,492	55.50%	3,491	43.13%	111	1.37%
2012	4,372	55.73%	3,332	42.47%	141	1.80%
2016	4,274	56.96%	2,722	36.27%	508	6.77%
2020	5,323	55.43%	3,983	41.48%	297	3.09%
2024	5,288	57.71%	3,674	40.10%	201	2.19%

=== Laws ===
Geary County was a prohibition, or "dry", county until the Kansas Constitution was amended in 1986 and voters approved the sale of alcoholic liquor by the individual drink with a 30% food sales requirement. The food sales requirement was removed with voter approval in 1990.

The county voted "No" on the 2022 Kansas abortion referendum, an anti-abortion ballot measure, by 61% to 39% despite backing Donald Trump with 55% of the vote to Joe Biden's 41% in the 2020 presidential election.

== Education ==
=== Unified school districts ===
- Geary County USD 475

== Communities ==
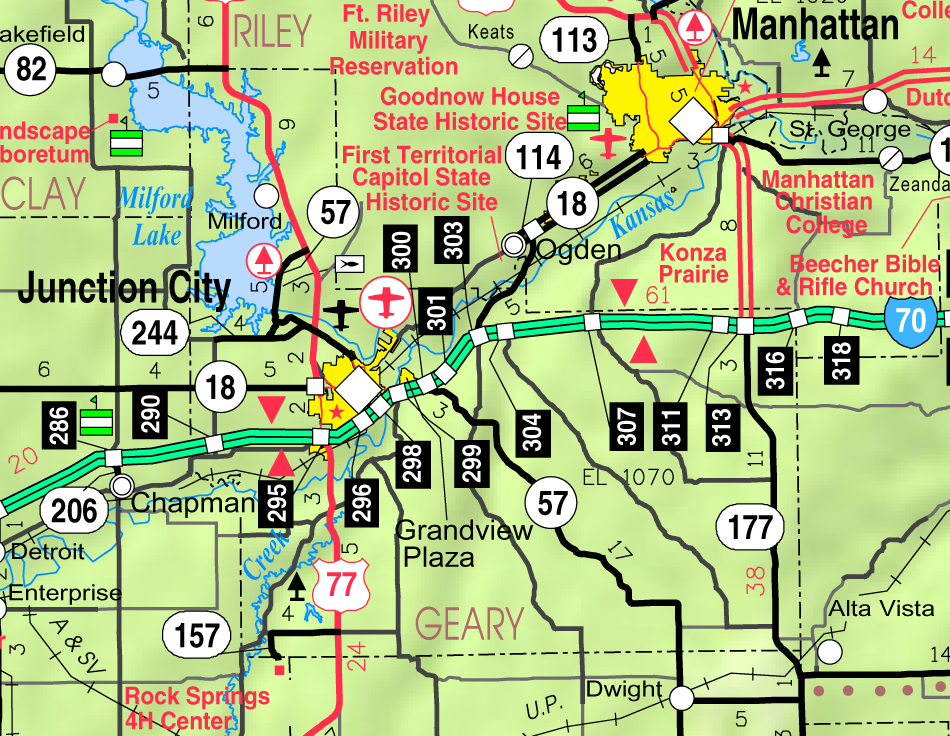
2005 map of Geary County (map legend)

List of townships / incorporated cities / unincorporated communities / extinct former communities within Geary County.

=== Cities ===
- Grandview Plaza
- Junction City (county seat)
- Milford

=== Unincorporated community ===
‡ means a community has portions in an adjacent county. † means a community is designated a Census-Designated Place (CDP) by the United States Census Bureau.

- Fort Riley†‡ (formerly Fort Riley North)
- Wreford

=== Ghost towns ===
- Alida, razed when Milford Lake was built
- Pawnee

=== Fort Riley ===
Located north of the junction of the Smoky Hill and Republican rivers, the Fort Riley Military Reservation covers 100,656 acres (407 km^{2}) in Geary and Riley counties. The fort has a daytime population of nearly 25,000 and includes one census-designated place.

=== Townships ===
Geary County is divided into eight townships. The city of Junction City is considered governmentally independent and is excluded from the census figures for the townships. In the following table, the population center is the largest city (or cities) included in that township's population total, if it is of a significant size.

Township	FIPS	Population center	Population	Population density /km^{2} (/sq mi)	Land area km^{2} (sq mi)	Water area km^{2} (sq mi)	Water %	Geographic coordinates
Blakely	07275		113	1 (3)	93 (36)	0 (0)	0.01%	38°54′32″N 96°45′9″W
Jackson	34775		78	1 (2)	104 (40)	0 (0)	0%	39°1′25″N 96°33′42″W
Jefferson	35200	Grandview Plaza	1,651	13 (35)	124 (48)	2 (1)	1.55%	39°1′53″N 96°46′53″W
Liberty	40050		225	1 (3)	171 (66)	0 (0)	0.03%	38°54′53″N 96°36′8″W
Lyon	43500		298	3 (7)	113 (43)	1 (1)	1.20%	38°55′17″N 96°52′3″W
Milford	46550		1,583	16 (41)	101 (39)	28 (11)	21.49%	39°8′59″N 96°54′22″W
Smoky Hill	66000		4,974	33 (86)	149 (58)	20 (8)	11.84%	39°2′14″N 96°53′58″W
Wingfield	80025		139	1 (3)	123 (48)	0 (0)	0%	38°59′38″N 96°38′37″W
Sources: "Census 2000 U.S. Gazetteer Files". U.S. Census Bureau, Geography Division. Archived from the original on August 2, 2002.

== See also ==
- National Register of Historic Places listings in Geary County, Kansas

Community information for Kansas

- Kansas locations by per capita income
- List of counties in Kansas
- List of townships in Kansas
- List of cities in Kansas
- List of unincorporated communities in Kansas
- List of ghost towns in Kansas
