= Kansas Landscape Arboretum =

Nonprofit arboretum in Wakefield, Kansas, United States

Coordinates: 39.195°N 97.011°W

- Interactive map of Kansas Landscape Arboretum
- Website: Official website

The Kansas Landscape Arboretum is a 193-acre (78 ha) nonprofit arboretum located in Wakefield, Kansas. The arboretum is open during daylight hours without admission charge.

The arboretum was established in 1972 mainly through the efforts of Ernest Bauer, Professor L. R. Quinlan (landscape architect at Kansas State University), and Bill Flynn (nurseryman from Abilene). Quinlan said that they had discussed the idea of a local landscape arboretum for 40 years before it became possible to gain support from the federal government. The United States Army Corps of Engineers project to create Milford Reservoir, the largest man-made lake in Kansas, created an opportunity for the arboretum, and in 1969 an organization was incorporated under the name Kansas Landscape Arboretum, sponsored by the Kansas State Horticultural Society. In 1972, the organization signed a lease with the Corps for 193 acres of land, and began planting native Kansas plants and creating recreational trails. The arboretum was formally dedicated on May 29, 1976.

When initially leased, the arboretum contained only 24 varieties of trees, shrubs, and flowers. It now includes about 1,000 species of native and exotic woody plants including green ash, crabapple, honey locust, juniper, maple, oak, osage-orange, pine, American sycamore, and black walnut. More than 260 of these species are identified with plaques along the Memorial Tree Walk. Much of the area is left in native vegetation. To maintain the overall "naturalness" of the views, trees with unusual or colorful foliage or particularly distinctive shapes (like "weeping" trees) are planted in a special display section. There are three short walking trails available, including a Bird Sanctuary Walk with stumps to sit on for bird-watching. The arboretum includes a view of Milford Lake.

== See also ==
- List of botanical gardens in the United States
