= Grand Army of the Republic Memorial Arch =

- Grand Army of the Republic (GAR) Memorial Arch
- U.S. National Register of Historic Places
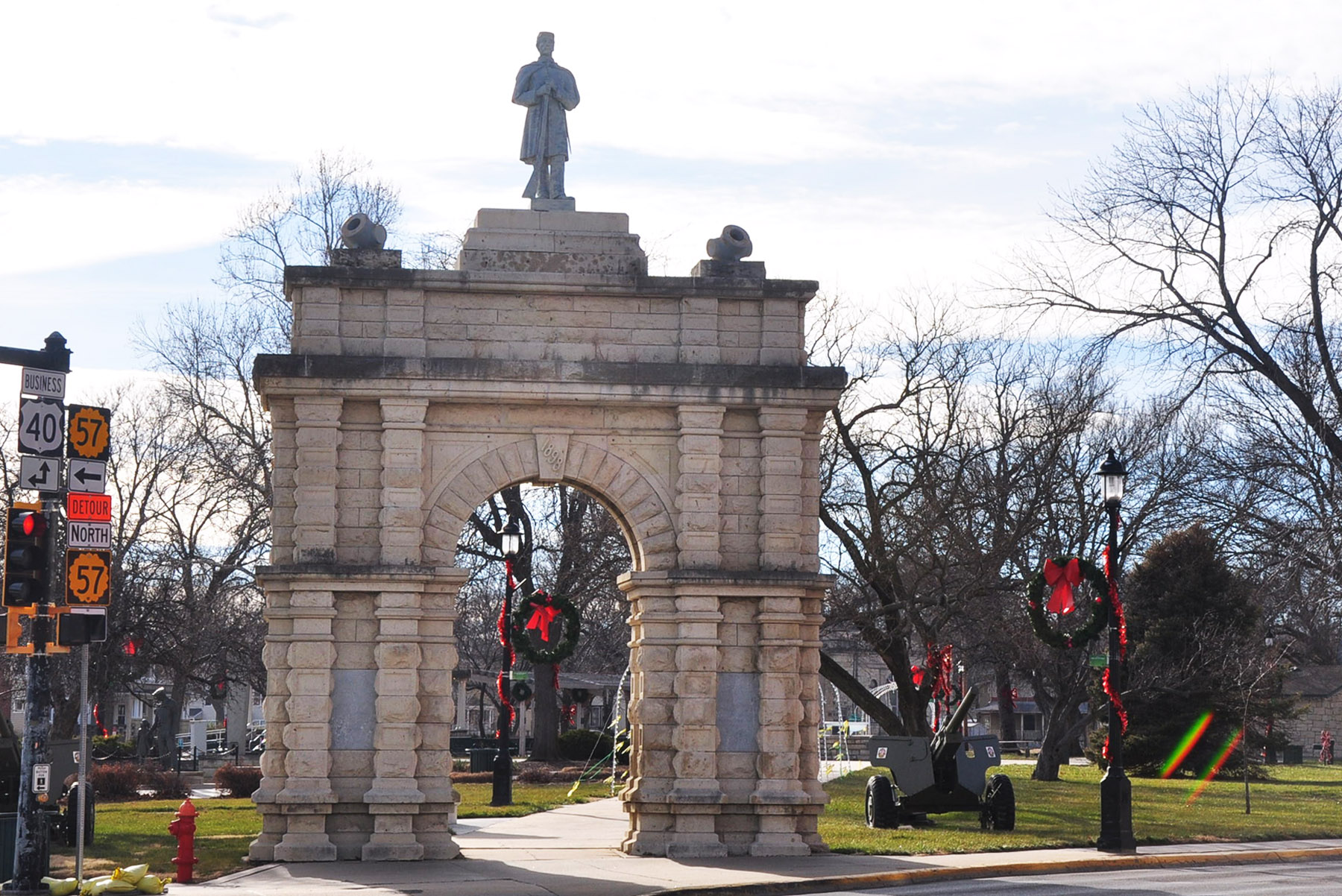

- Location within Kansas Location within the United States
- Location: 500 N. Washington St. Junction City, Kansas
- Coordinates: 39°01′41″N 96°49′47″W
- Area: less than one acre
- Built: 1898
- NRHP reference No.: 100000512
- Added to NRHP: January 11, 2017

The Grand Army of the Republic Memorial Arch in Junction City, Kansas, USA, was listed on the National Register of Historic Places in 2017.

It was erected in 1898. Located at the corner of 6th and Washington in Junction City, it is known also as the Heritage Park Memorial Arch.
