= K82 =

K82 or K-82 may refer to:

- K-82 (Kansas highway), a state highway in Kansas
- HMS Larkspur (K82), a former UK Royal Navy ship
- INS Veer (K82), a former Indian Navy ship
