= Walter Strickland (architect) =

Canadian architect

Walter Reginald Strickland (August 1841 – February 6, 1915) was a Canadian architect known for buildings such as the Dixon and Griffiths Buildings (Toronto). He was a partner in the firm Strickland & Symonds.
