= James Dixon House =

Historic house in Kansas, United States

- U.S. National Register of Historic Places
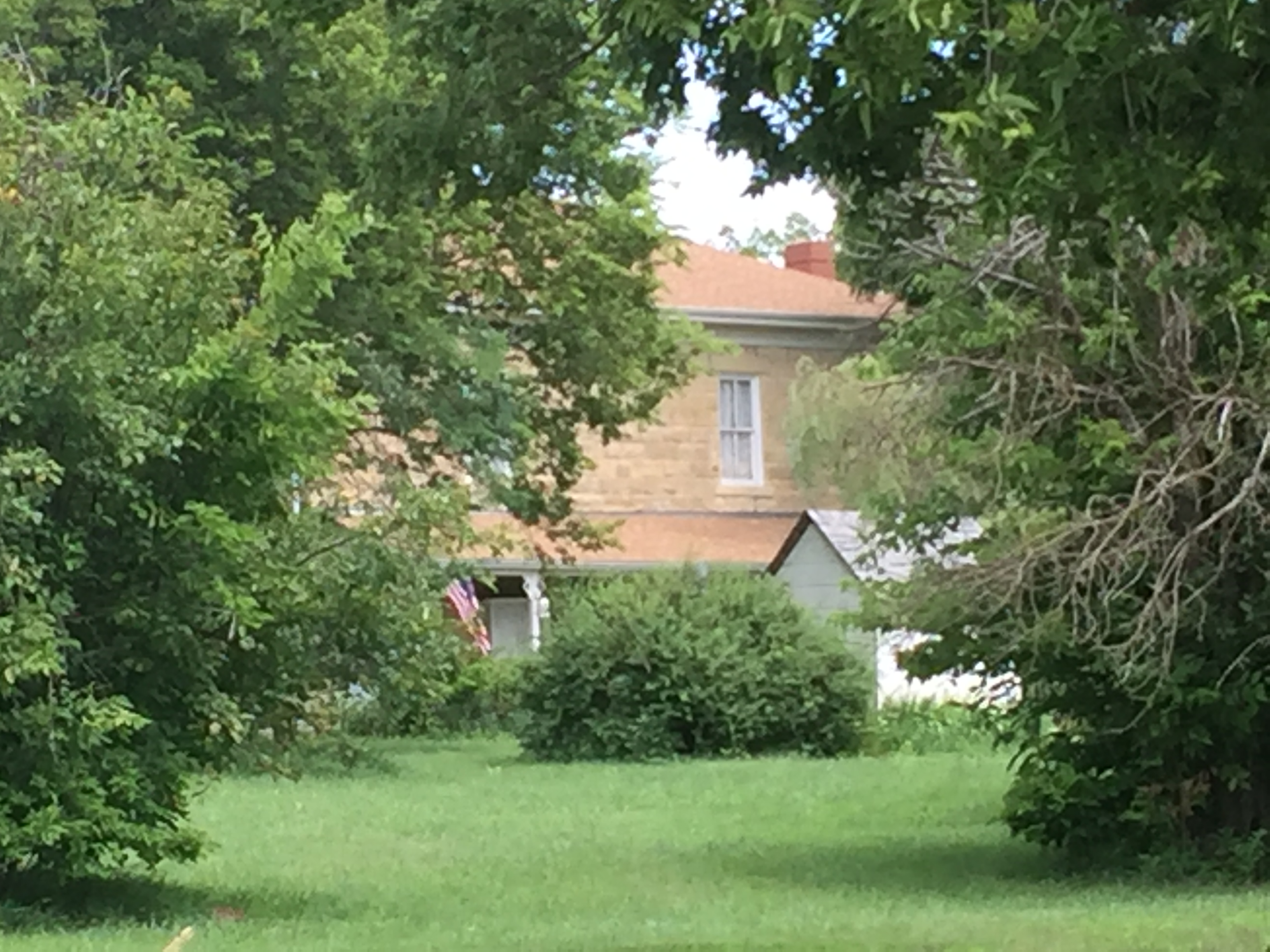
- House viewed from public road

- Location within Kansas Location within the United States
- Nearest city: Milford, Kansas
- Coordinates: 39°6′33″N 96°50′58″W
- Area: less than one acre
- Built: 1880
- Architectural style: Italianate
- NRHP reference No.: 98000265
- Added to NRHP: April 1, 1998

The James Dixon House (also known as Military View Farm) is a historic farmhouse located near Milford, Riley County, Kansas.

== Description and history ==
It was the originally the home of James Thomas Dixon, a farmer, stock raiser and local postmaster. Dixon began building the house in the 1870s and moved into the structure in late 1880 with his family. The two-story house was built at a cost of $10,000 out of rusticated limestone block and is designed in an Italianate style. The house has sometimes been called Military View Farm, because it was located on a hilltop overlooking Fort Riley. The house was restored in 1993 and 1994 and was listed on the National Register of Historic Places on April 1, 1998.
