= Geary County USD 475 =

Public school district in Junction City, Kansas

Address
- 123 N. Eisenhower Drive Junction City, Kansas, 66441; United States
- Coordinates: 39.02383°N 96.84856°W

District information
- Type: Public
- Grades: K to 12
- Schools: 17

Other information
- Website: usd475.org

Geary County USD 475 is a public unified school district headquartered in Junction City, Kansas, United States. The district includes the communities of Grandview Plaza, Junction City, Milford, Fort Riley, and nearby rural areas.

== Schools ==
The school district operates 1 high school, 2 middle schools, 14 elementary schools:

Junction City:

- Junction City High School
- Junction City Middle School
- Eisenhower Elementary School
- Franklin Elementary School
- Lincoln Elementary School
- Sheridan Elementary School
- Spring Valley Elementary School
- Washington Elementary School
- Westwood Elementary School
- H.D. Karns Building

Fort Riley:

- Fort Riley Middle School
- Fort Riley Elementary School
- Morris Hill Elementary School
- Seitz Elementary School
- Ware Elementary School

Milford:

- Milford Elementary School

Other:

- Early Childhood Center

Former schools:

- Grandview Elementary School

== See also ==
- Kansas State Department of Education
- Kansas State High School Activities Association
- List of high schools in Kansas
- List of unified school districts in Kansas
