= Milford Lake =

Reservoir in Geary / Clay / Dickinson counties in Kansas, US

- Location within Kansas Location within the United States

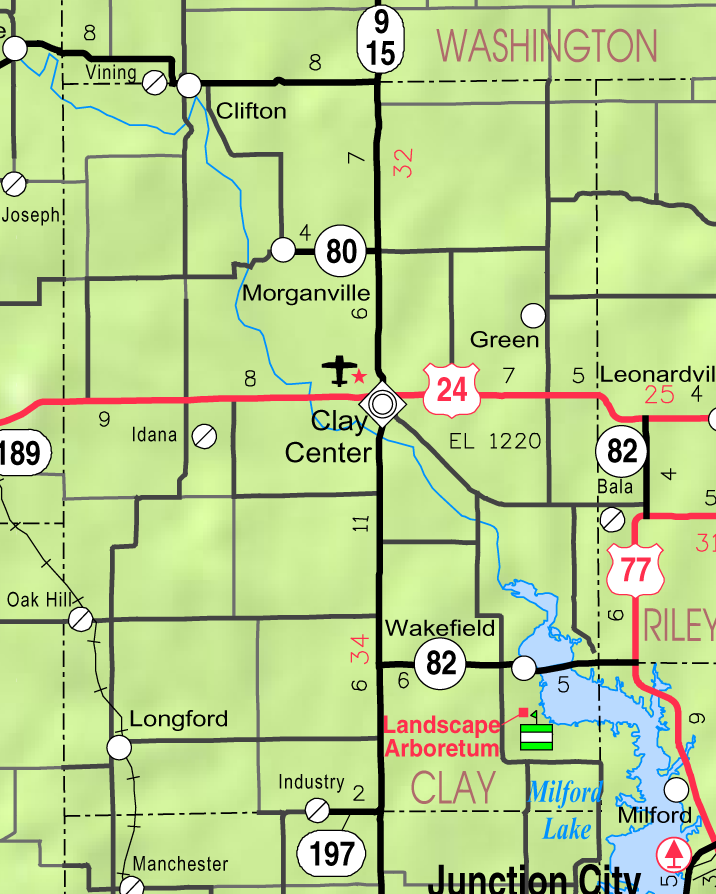
- KDOT map of Clay County (legend)
- Location: Geary / Clay / Dickinson counties in Kansas
- Coordinates: 39°05′00″N 096°53′52″W
- Type: Reservoir
- Primary inflows: Republican River
- Primary outflows: Republican River to Kansas River
- Basin countries: United States
- Surface area: 15,700 acres (6,400 ha)
- Max. depth: 65 ft (20 m)
- Water volume: 388,000 acre⋅ft (479,000,000 m^{3})
- Surface elevation: 1,148 ft (350 m)
- Settlements: Junction City, Wakefield, Milford

Milford Lake, also known as Milford Reservoir, is the largest man-made lake in Kansas with 15,700 acres (64 km^{2}) of water. Over 33,000 acres (130 km^{2}) of land resources are managed for quality recreational experiences as well as for protection of the project’s natural and cultural resources. Approximately 70% of the land resources are available for public hunting.

== Project history ==
The creation of Milford Lake was authorized by the Flood Control Act of 1954 to provide flood control, water supply, water quality, navigation, and recreation/wildlife. Construction of the Milford Dam began July 13, 1962 at mile 8.3 of the Republican River, as a project owned and operated by the United States Army Corps of Engineers.

The dam consists of a rolled earth fill embankment of 15 million cubic yards (11×10^{6} m^{3}), with an uncontrolled spillway on the right bank. (The term "uncontrolled" refers to the lack of spillway gates such as those at Tuttle Creek Lake in Manhattan, Kansas.) Normal water storage impounds 388,000 acre-feet (479,000,000 m^{3}).

Many contractors were involved with the project during the construction phase. Contractors built new roads and altered existing roadways, and relocated railroad facilities, city owned facilities in Wakefield and Milford, electrical, telephone, and gas lines, and cemeteries. They also built recreation areas and cleared structures from within the reservoir flood pool.

The towns of Alida and Broughton ceased to exist, with houses either moved to other locations, razed, burned, or buried.

The community of Alida had a major clearing contract for the removal of the Alida Cooperative grain elevator. Originally a local chiropractor sought to gain permission to develop the grain elevator into a hotel with a restaurant. Corps of Engineers studies showed that the base of the elevator would not support the structure after the lake inundated it. According to local newspaper articles, it took six separate blasts over a two-day period to bring the elevator down.

The community of Broughton had two railroads that came through the town, the Rock Island from the east and the Union Pacific from the southeast. The town had a stockyard, grain elevator, post office, school, church, telephone exchange, grocery store, private homes, and a blacksmith’s shop under a large cottonwood tree. According to a local newspaper article, many men who lived in the area worked for the railroads. Even though the community is gone, an annual Broughton picnic is held for those who still remember.

Portions of the cities of Wakefield and Milford were relocated to higher ground. Farms were dismantled and trees were removed from areas soon to be covered by the lake waters.

Impoundment of the lake began January 16, 1967 and six months later on July 13, the multipurpose pool elevation of 1,144.4 feet (348.8 m) above mean sea level was reached. Milford Lake’s dedication ceremony was held in May 1968. Lyndon Johnson, then President of the United States, was scheduled to appear but did not come.

Over the course of the last 34 years the Milford Lake Project has provided over $921 million in flood prevention including $250 million during the 1993 fiscal year (Oct. 1, 1992 – Sept. 30, 1993). The initial cost of construction of the dam and reservoir was approximately $49,700,000.

== Flood history ==
The years 1849, 1869, 1903, 1935, 1951, and 1993 all hosted record setting historical floods for the area. A flood has occurred almost every year since the first recorded flood.

=== Before Milford Dam ===
Native Americans of long ago talked of a great flood in 1781. However, the 1849 flood was one of the first major floods reported by early European settlers, with a newspaper account of an old man who was an eyewitness in his youth to the 1849 flood. He reported immense herds of buffalo being drowned and washed up into the tops of trees along the rivers. Due to a heavy frost immediately following, the buffalo carcasses were preserved long enough for the flood survivors to eat well until the spring thaw. In the spring when the carcasses began to rot, it was suspected that they were the cause of a cholera outbreak.

The flood of 1869 caused a major loss of life. Reports were given of entire families being washed away while a few survivors clung to the tops of trees for hours, hoping to be saved. One story told of an infant who was tied up in a man’s shirt, and then tied to a tree surrounded by water to await rescue. Due to the swift current, nearby rescuers unable to take action were forced to listen to the child’s cries for 5 hours. Finally, when they were able to come back in a boat to rescue the child, it took all the extra men available to hold a rope tied to the boat to keep the boat from swamping and being washed away.

The 1935 flood had the highest combined flow ever recorded for the Republican and Smoky Hill rivers. These two rivers meet within the city limits of Junction City, Kansas and form the Kansas River. Hours before, a cloudburst had occurred at McCook, Nebraska sending a wall of water down the Republican River. At Milford, Kansas eight boxcars were turned over and the Union Pacific Depot was washed off its site. Near Alida, Kansas the Republican River cut a new channel north of town. After the floodwater receded there was talk of trying to straighten the river channel.

The Great Flood of 1951 was the last major flood in the area before the Milford Dam was built. It reportedly caused the combined total $6,500,000 in flood damages in the Fort Riley and Junction City area. After the 1951 disaster, the local newspapers were filled with articles requesting the federal government to intercede and build dams along the Republican, Smoky Hill, and Big Blue rivers.

=== After Milford Dam ===
The flood of 1993 was the first major flood to occur after the Milford Lake Dam was built. Many locals involved with fighting the flood agree that 1993 would have been much worse than the 1951 flood without the protection offered by the Milford Dam. Although flooding could not be completely stopped, the dam system and other flood protection work lessened the loss of life and property. In 1993, well above average rainfalls had been taking place throughout the entire Midwest for several months, and the ground was saturated, unable to soak up the continuing rainfall. Rivers and levees were holding the rising waters in check, but they were full. It continued to rain. Lakes along the upper and lower Missouri River Basin closed their gates so as not to add to the flooding that was beginning further downstream. The rain continued until finally the rivers, levees, and lakes could hold no more and the Great Flood of 1993 went underway, with flooding of a magnitude not seen since 1951.

The Milford Dam was built to protect the Kansas River Basin. Waters from Milford Lake enter the Kansas River at Junction City, which in turn flows into the Missouri River at Kansas City. The Missouri River then empties into the Mississippi River, which transports Milford Lake waters to the Gulf of Mexico. After holding floodwaters back for weeks at the Milford Dam, and upon reaching a lake elevation 32 feet (9.8 m) above normal, the focus on flood protection changed to that of protecting the dam structures. All additional waters, which flowed in, had to be released. On July 19, 1993 the gates in the dam were fully opened to release water at a rate of 22,500 cu ft/s (640 m^{3}/s). Rain continued to fall in the area and the lake continued to rise until water began to flow through the uncontrolled spillway. The design of the spillway controls the flow of the water, eventually directing it back into the river channel below the dam.

For two weeks water flowed through the spillway to a maximum depth of 6 feet (1.8 m). The continuous rush of water removed tons of soil, numerous trees, and a portion of the 244 Spur Highway. Pooling waters from the spillway flow also threatened to damage U.S. Highway 77. To protect the U.S. highway, a culvert was intentionally breached on State Highway 57 to allow the pooling floodwaters to drain back into the Republican River channel. Throughout the entire flood, the dam performed as designed and held floodwaters back, lessening the downstream flood damage. During the highest release of water through the dam, 22,500 cu ft/s (640 m^{3}/s) which lasted for approximately 10 hours, the riverbank channel immediately below the dam suffered some erosion damage. In the winter of 1996/7, repairs were made to the damaged channel below the dam. To prevent future damage during extremely high releases, the river channel was dropped 12 feet (3.7 m) in elevation by excavation. The removed rock was used to create a berm across the south bank washout. The channel banks were re-graded, re-rocked, and re-grouted.

== Inhabitants ==
=== Before 1800 ===
The Milford Lake region for the most part has been consistently inhabited. Areas with an abundance of food (both wildlife and plant life), constant water supply, moderate climate, and diverse topography have been attracting mankind throughout the ages. This is a breakdown of the people living in the Milford Lake region before the 1800s.

- Paleo-Indians (Big game hunters) 8,000 – 10,000 years ago
- Archaic Indians (Hunter/Gatherers) 0 – 6,000 BC
- Early Ceramic (Plains Woodland) Farmed native plants. In 200 AD "Kansas City residents" grew domesticated corn. 0 – 1000 AD
- Middle Ceramic (Village farmers) Beans, corn, squash introduced. At 1000 AD these people were the early ancestors of the Pawnee. 1000–1500 AD
- Late Ceramic (Kaw [Kansa] arrived) late 18th century and early 19th century, and the horse was introduced by the Spanish. The French named the Kansa Indians. A map dated 1784 shows a Kansa settlement at the existing Washington Street bridge in Junction City, Kansas. 1500–1800 AD

=== Bogan site ===
Milford Lake has many recorded cultural sites both pre- and post-19th century on government lands. The one that stands out the most for its historical value is the Bogan Site. The Bogan Site was a small earthlodge village, constructed and inhabited by the Republican River Pawnee Indians. The site was most likely inhabited during the late 18th and possibly early 19th century. Due to the village’s small size and the number of artifacts recovered, the village was probably inhabited for only a short time. The village was built upon a prominent hilltop overlooking the Republican River valley, a good advantage point for defending the village from enemies. Enemies were prevalent in the area as a fortified wall surrounded the village.

In 1930 a local amateur archeologist did a small amount of digging at the Bogan Site. He misidentified the legal description of the location of the site, leaving it "lost" until 1964 when the Milford Lake Project was underway. In 1964, the University of Nebraska, Laboratory of Anthropology tested the site. Then in 1967, the Kansas Historical Society's archeological division further investigated the site. This was the last archeological study done at the Bogan Site.

The 1967 investigation led to the discovery that the village had been completely destroyed by a fire. Even the fortification, or palisade, was burned. Originally the fortification was built by setting posts vertically in a trench around the village. The trench was filled with dirt, stabilizing the posts.

One house was excavated. The floor of the house was covered with a coating of clay. Posts, which supported the walls and the roof, were set in three circles. The inner circle had 6 posts, the middle circle had 28 posts, and the outer circle had 60 posts.

The dwelling was 44 feet (13 m) in diameter. The framework of each house was covered with willows, thatched grass, and covered with sod. Evidence from the other two house sites indicates that they were burned as well.

81 artifacts were recovered from the Bogan Site. Six are on display in the Milford Visitor Center.

It is plausible that the village was abandoned before it was completely occupied. This explains the size of the fortification and the fact that there were only three houses built. Building a fortification took lots of work and extreme effort on the part of the laborers. Trees were not abundant during this time period in Kansas, so man and horsepower probably transported the trees used to build the fortification and houses over long distances.

At the time of the Bogan Site, Kansa Indians had emigrated to Kansas and were fearful enemies of the Pawnee. It is unknown whether the native Kansa burnt the village or it was destroyed by a prairie wildfire.

No evidence was found of food stored in storage caches, and there were few recovered artifacts. The Pawnee may have already abandoned the village site or may have simply been gone on one of their far ranging hunts and taken all items of value with them at the time of the destruction of the village.

The Bogan Site is the third Pawnee village site found along the Republican River. The other two are the Kansas Monument Site (a 10-acre (40,000 m^{2}) site near Republic, KS) and the Hill Site (a 25-acre (100,000 m^{2}) site near Red Cloud, NE).

== See also ==
- List of Kansas state parks
- List of lakes, reservoirs, and dams in Kansas
- List of rivers of Kansas
