= Junction City High School (Kansas) =

Public high school in Junction City, Kansas

Location
- 1100 Blue Jay Way; Junction City, Kansas 66441; United States; 39.0334°N 96.8872°W

Information
- Type: Public high school
- Established: 1904; 122 years ago
- School district: Geary County USD 475
- CEEB code: 171510
- NCES School ID: 200789001267
- Principal: Gennifer Booth
- Teaching staff: 133.00 (on an FTE basis)
- Grades: 9–12
- Gender: Coeducational
- Enrollment: 1,723 (2023–24)
- Student to teacher ratio: 12.95
- Campus size: 159 acres (64 ha)
- Colors: Blue and White
- Mascot: Blue jay
- Rival: Manhattan High School
- Newspaper: The Blue Jay
- Website: jchs.usd475.org

Junction City High School is a public four-year high school in Junction City, Kansas. It is operated by the Geary County USD 475 school district.

== History ==
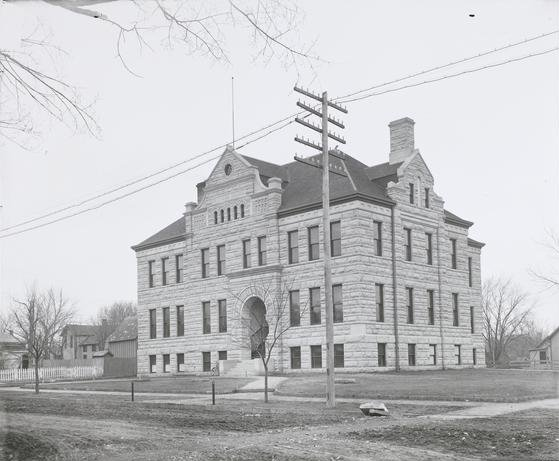
A 1905 photograph of the Old Junction City High School taken shortly after opening

The roots of high school education in the Junction City area can be traced back to the establishment of the McKinley School in 1872, which served as the primary educational facility for elementary and high school students until the construction of a dedicated high school building.

The Old Junction City High School was constructed between 1903 and 1904 at Sixth and Adams Streets, becoming the first building specifically designed for high school education in Junction City. Designed by the Topeka architectural firm of Holland and Squires, the structure was characterized by Romanesque architectural elements and was constructed from local coursed, rock-faced limestone. It featured a prominent T-plan design, with a main entrance facing east on Adams Street and distinct architectural features, including a round-arched opening supported by foliated capitals and multiple gabled wall dormers. The building opened on September 12, 1904, with an enrollment of 192 students.

Initially, the Old Junction City High School operated as a four-year institution until 1918, when the construction of a junior high school shifted the educational model to a three-year high school. The last graduating class from this facility occurred in 1929, after which the building was repurposed for various educational levels, eventually serving as a sixth-grade school until the late 20th century. During its later years, it also housed administrative offices and served as a venue for board of education meetings.

In 1930, high school classes were moved to a new addition to the junior high school, which was built to accommodate students in grades seven through twelve. This structure was initially designed for 900 students but accommodated as many as 1,200 in its final year as a Junior-Senior High School. The next major transition occurred in the fall of 1958, when a new Junction City Senior High School was opened on Eisenhower Drive, serving students in grades ten through twelve. Meanwhile, students in grades seven through nine attended the Junior High School located at 300 West Ninth Street until 1990, when it converted to a middle school serving grades six through eight.

As the need for modern educational facilities grew, the district placed a bond initiative for a new high school before voters, who approved the measure in November 2017. The approved bond was initially set at $105 million but was adjusted to $132 million by the time of bidding due to rising construction costs. Construction began 159-acre site on the northwest edge of Junction City in April 2019. In April 2021, the project was also awarded approximately $67 million in federal "heavy impact aid" designated for military-impacted districts as over 50% of the student population of the district is military-dependent. The new Junction City High School spans approximately 437,000 square feet and opened its doors on August 25, 2021, amid ongoing construction. The school had a ribbon cutting ceremony later that year on October 9.

== Academics ==
=== Enrollment ===
In the 2023-24 school year, the school had 1,723 students and 133 teachers (on an FTE basis), yielding a student-teacher ratio of 12.95. The student body was 0.3% American Indian/Alaska Native, 2.6% Asian, 17.8% Black, 20.2% Hispanic, 45.8% White, 3.7% Native Hawaiian/Pacific Islander, and 9.9% multiracial. Approximately 47% of students qualified for free or reduced-price meals.

=== Curriculum ===
Junction City High School contains four academic academies: the Freshman Success Academy (FSA), the Science, Engineering, and Health (SEH) Academy, the Business, Public Service, and Hospitality (BPSH) Academy, and the Fine Arts and Human Services (FAHS) Academy.

Junction City High School offers several programs for students to gain college credit and career certification while in high school. The school provides a range of Advanced Placement (AP) courses, allowing students to earn college credit while in high school. Additionally, through a partnership with Cloud County Community College, students can participate in "dual enrollment", enabling them to take college-level classes that count for both high school and college credit. The school also offers career-based certifications in various programs, including automotive, welding, ServSafe, emergency medical technician (EMT), certified nursing aide (CNA), and others.

The graduation requirements include a total of 26 credits, distributed across various subject areas. Students must complete four credits in English/language arts, including courses such as English I, II, III, and IV or their AP equivalents. A total of 1 credit in fine arts is required, alongside 1 credit in health and physical education, which includes 0.5 credits in health and 0.5 credits in physical education electives. Mathematics requires 3 credits, with courses at or above algebraic concepts. Science requirements consist of 3 credits, including biology, physical science, and a third science elective. Social Science also requires 3 credits, covering world history, U.S. history, and American government. Additionally, students must complete 8.5 elective credits, which can include any courses beyond the required total.

For the class of 2028 and beyond, the requirements remain similar, with the addition of a 1-credit STEM or CTE (career and technical education) course and 0.5 credits in financial literacy, to be taken in the junior or senior year. The total elective credits required are reduced to 7.

For graduation, students must also fulfill two or more post-secondary assets from either career and real-world or academic categories. Career and real-world examples include community service, workplace learning experiences, and industry-recognized certifications. Academic examples include achieving specific scores on standardized tests or completing advanced coursework.

== Extracurricular activities ==
Junction City High School offers various extracurricular and co-curricular activities. These include academic organizations, arts programs, and community service groups, along with special interest and technology-focused clubs. The music program provides opportunities for students to participate in various musical ensembles and performances. Additionally, the Scholars Bowl offers academic competition among students from other schools, while the speech and drama program offers students the opportunity to participate in theatrical productions and public speaking.

Junction City High School also offers an Army Junior Reserve Officers' Training Corps (JROTC) program as a voluntary elective. Participants in the program have the opportunity to engage in various extracurricular activities, including the raider team, drill team, color guard, marksmanship, JROTC Leadership and Academic Bowl (JLAB), and battalion staff, throughout their four years in the program.

=== Athletics ===
The athletic program at Junction City High School includes a variety of sports available for students across three seasons. The school is a member of the Kansas State High School Activities Association and competes at the 6A level in the Centennial League. Fall sports consist of cross country, football, soccer, and volleyball; winter sports include basketball, swimming, and wrestling; and spring sports feature baseball, softball, and track and field.

== Notable people ==
- DJ Giddens, professional football running back for the Indianapolis Colts
- Nick Heath, professional baseball outfielder
- Ron Prince, college football coach
- Isiah Young, college track and field athlete

== See also ==
- List of high schools in Kansas
- List of unified school districts in Kansas
