= S. P. Dixon Farm =

- U.S. National Register of Historic Places
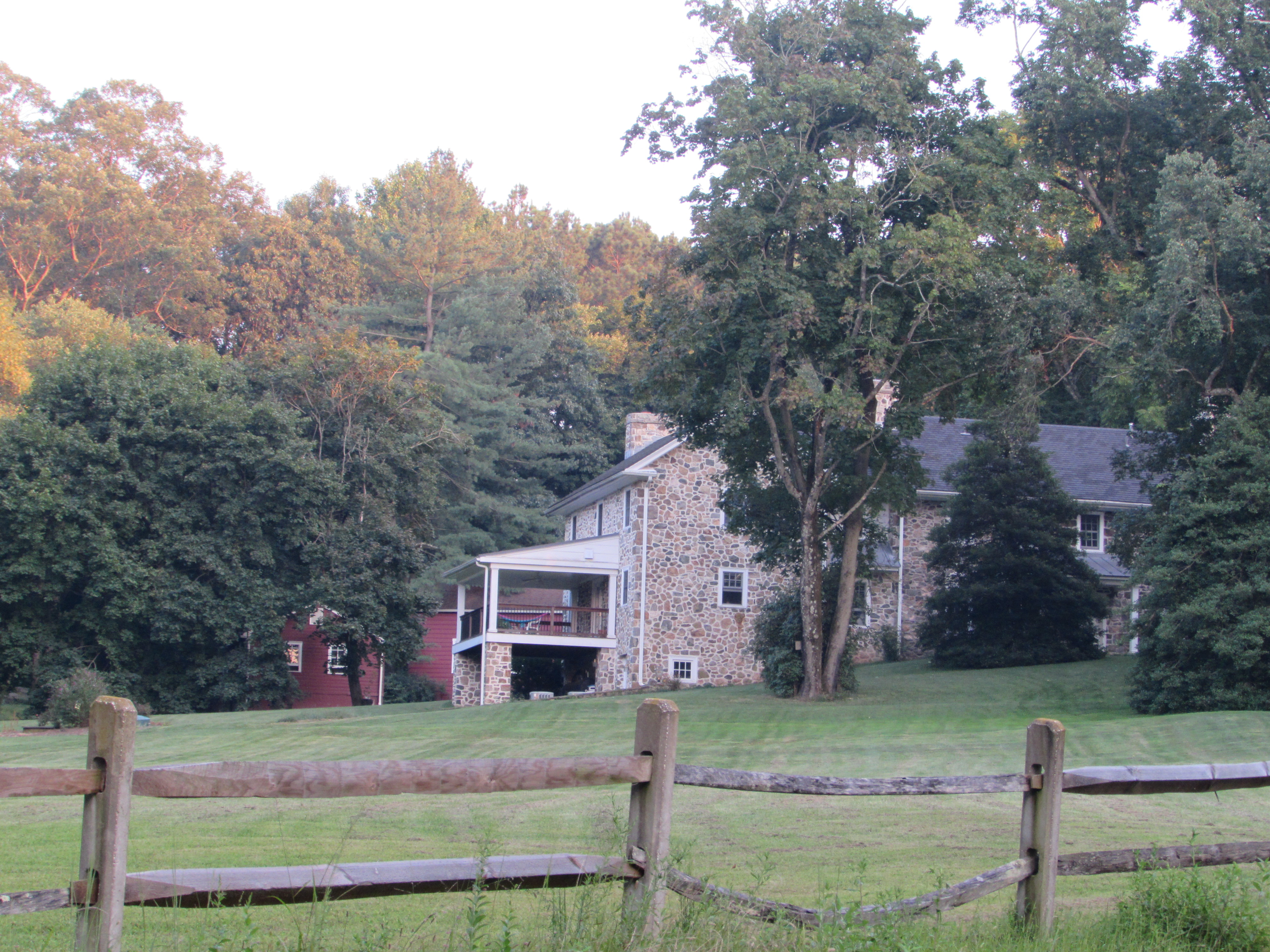
- Side view of the S. P. Dixon farmhouse.

- Location within Delaware Location within the United States
- Location: Barley Mill and Brackenville Rds., near Ashland, Delaware
- Coordinates: 39.795786°N 75.657526°W
- Area: 3 acres (1.2 ha)
- Built: c. 1812
- Architectural style: Tri-level barn
- MPS: Agricultural Buildings and Complexes in Mill Creek Hundred, 1800-1840 TR
- NRHP reference No.: 86003085
- Added to NRHP: November 13, 1986

The Samuel P. Dixon Farm is a historic farm near Ashland, New Castle County, Delaware. The property includes three contributing stone buildings: a house, a spring house and a tri-level bank barn. The house is a two-story, four-bay dwelling in two sections. The older section is dated to the late 18th or early 19th century, with an addition before 1830, about the time the barn was built.

In the 20th century, it became part of Ashland Farm, a Du Pont estate. It was added to the National Register of Historic Places in 1986.
