= Dixon House (Poughkeepsie, New York) =

Historic house in New York, United States

- U.S. National Register of Historic Places
- Location within New York Location within the United States
- Location: 49 N. Clinton St., Poughkeepsie, New York
- Coordinates: 41°42′18″N 73°55′12″W
- Area: less than one acre
- Built: 1862-1867
- Built by: Dixon, Robert
- Architectural style: Gothic Revival
- MPS: Poughkeepsie MRA
- NRHP reference No.: 82001129
- Added to NRHP: November 26, 1982

Dixon House is a historic home located at Poughkeepsie, Dutchess County, New York. It was built between 1862 and 1867, and is a 2 1/2-story, Gothic Revival style frame dwelling. It features pointed arched windows, a projecting bay, and two-bay front porch with curved brackets and square columns.

It was listed on the National Register of Historic Places in 1982.
