= Junction City, Kansas =

City in Geary County, Kansas

- City and County seat
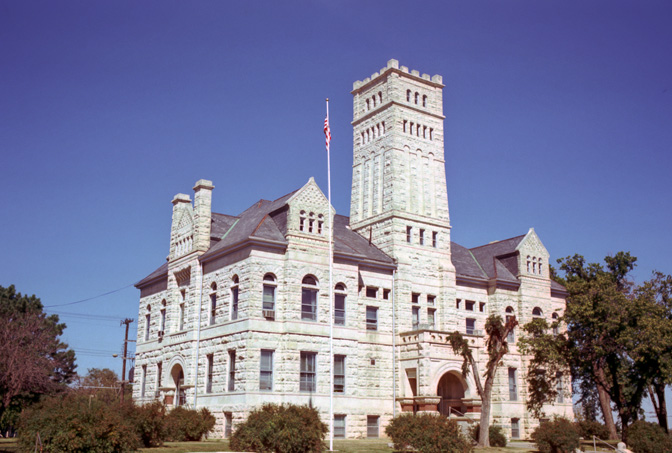
- Geary County Courthouse (1979)

- Location within Geary County and Kansas

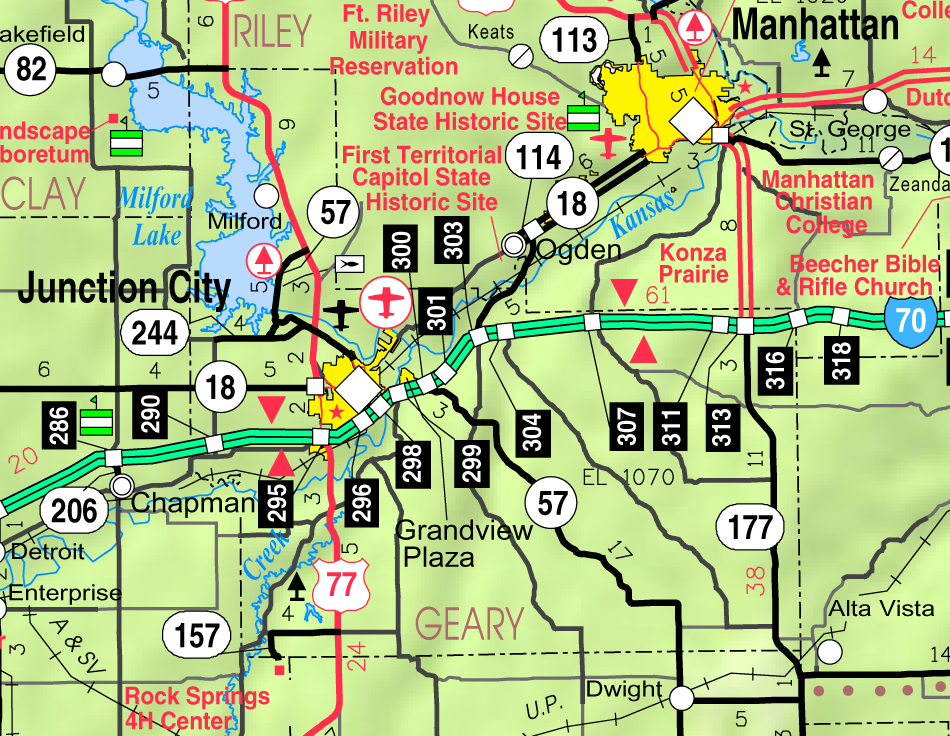
- KDOT map of Geary County (legend)
- Coordinates: 39°1′39″N 96°50′25″W
- Country: United States
- State: Kansas
- County: Geary

Area
  - Total: 11.20 sq mi (29.02 km^{2})
  - Land: 11.11 sq mi (28.77 km^{2})
  - Water: 0.097 sq mi (0.25 km^{2})
- Elevation: 1,106 ft (337 m)

Population (2020)
  - Total: 22,932
  - Density: 2,064/sq mi (797.1/km^{2})
- Time zone: UTC-6 (CST)
  - Summer (DST): UTC-5 (CDT)
- ZIP Codes: 66441-66442
- Area code: 785
- FIPS code: 20-35750
- GNIS ID: 476555
- Website: junctioncity-ks.gov

Junction City is a city in and the county seat of Geary County, Kansas, United States. As of the 2020 census, the population of the city was 22,932. Fort Riley, a major U.S. Army post, is nearby.

== History ==
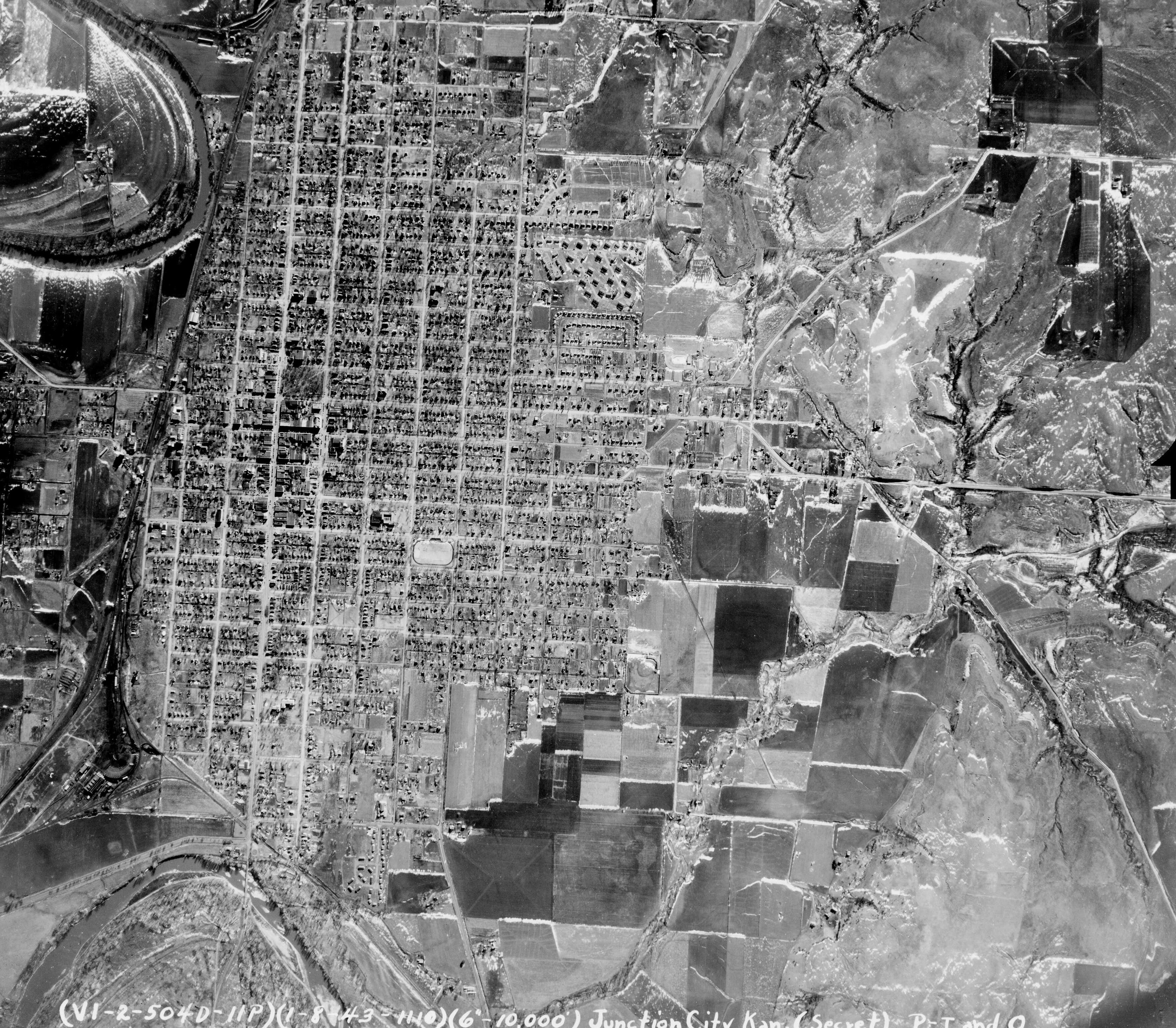
Aerial view of Junction City, 1943

Junction City is so named from its position at the confluence of the Smoky Hill and Republican rivers, which forms the Kansas River.

In 1854, Andrew J. Mead of New York of the Cincinnati-Manhattan Company, Free Staters connected to the Massachusetts Emigrant Aid Company planned a community there called Manhattan (there was also a discussion to call it New Cincinnati). When the steamship Hartford delivering the immigrants could not reach the community because of low water on the Kansas River, the Free Staters settled 20 miles east in what today is Manhattan, Kansas. The community was renamed Millard City for Captain Millard of the Hartford on October 3, 1855. It was renamed briefly Humboldt in 1857 by local farmers and renamed again later that year to Junction City. It was formally incorporated in 1859.

In 1923, John R. Brinkley established radio station KFKB (which adopted the slogan Kansas First, Kansas Best) in nearby Milford, Kansas, using a 1 kW transmitter. It was one of the first radio stations in Kansas. Brinkley used the station to espouse his belief that goat testicles could be implanted in men to enhance their virility.

Among Junction City's residents is film director Kevin Wilmott, whose movies, including Ninth Street, are set in Junction City. Ninth Street specifically refers to a bawdy area of the community that was frequented by Fort Riley soldiers in the 1960s. In the 1980s a major initiative was undertaken to clean up the Ninth St. area.

Timothy McVeigh rented the Ryder truck he used in the Oklahoma City bombing from an auto body shop in Junction City.

== Geography ==
According to the United States Census Bureau, the city has a total area of 12.22 square miles (31.65 km^{2}), of which 12.15 square miles (31.47 km^{2}) is land and 0.07 square miles (0.18 km^{2}) is water.

=== Climate ===
The maximum temperature reaches 90 °F (32 °C) an average of 45.9 days per year and reaches 100 °F (38 °C) an average of 6.4 days per year. The minimum temperature falls below the freezing point 32 °F (0 °C) an average of 121.8 days per year.

Climate data for Junction City, Kansas (Milford Dam) (1991–2020 normals, extremes 1944–present)
Month	Jan	Feb	Mar	Apr	May	Jun	Jul	Aug	Sep	Oct	Nov	Dec	Year
Record high °F (°C)	76 (24)	79 (26)	90 (32)	96 (36)	100 (38)	108 (42)	110 (43)	112 (44)	109 (43)	94 (34)	84 (29)	75 (24)	112 (44)
Mean maximum °F (°C)	62.8 (17.1)	68.6 (20.3)	78.9 (26.1)	86.1 (30.1)	90.3 (32.4)	96.0 (35.6)	101.4 (38.6)	100.3 (37.9)	94.7 (34.8)	87.6 (30.9)	74.4 (23.6)	64.8 (18.2)	103.0 (39.4)
Mean daily maximum °F (°C)	39.2 (4.0)	43.8 (6.6)	55.1 (12.8)	65.1 (18.4)	74.3 (23.5)	84.2 (29.0)	89.2 (31.8)	87.6 (30.9)	80.1 (26.7)	68.1 (20.1)	54.0 (12.2)	42.4 (5.8)	65.3 (18.5)
Daily mean °F (°C)	29.2 (−1.6)	33.1 (0.6)	43.9 (6.6)	53.6 (12.0)	64.1 (17.8)	74.2 (23.4)	79.0 (26.1)	77.0 (25.0)	69.0 (20.6)	56.6 (13.7)	43.4 (6.3)	32.8 (0.4)	54.7 (12.6)
Mean daily minimum °F (°C)	19.3 (−7.1)	22.5 (−5.3)	32.7 (0.4)	42.1 (5.6)	53.8 (12.1)	64.1 (17.8)	68.9 (20.5)	66.5 (19.2)	58.0 (14.4)	45.2 (7.3)	32.7 (0.4)	23.1 (−4.9)	44.1 (6.7)
Mean minimum °F (°C)	−0.1 (−17.8)	4.6 (−15.2)	13.1 (−10.5)	27.1 (−2.7)	38.7 (3.7)	52.3 (11.3)	59.4 (15.2)	56.6 (13.7)	42.5 (5.8)	28.2 (−2.1)	16.7 (−8.5)	7.0 (−13.9)	−3.3 (−19.6)
Record low °F (°C)	−17 (−27)	−18 (−28)	−9 (−23)	8 (−13)	29 (−2)	41 (5)	47 (8)	46 (8)	28 (−2)	15 (−9)	−1 (−18)	−21 (−29)	−21 (−29)
Average precipitation inches (mm)	0.66 (17)	1.09 (28)	1.95 (50)	3.13 (80)	5.16 (131)	4.80 (122)	4.15 (105)	4.19 (106)	2.84 (72)	2.27 (58)	1.40 (36)	1.26 (32)	32.90 (836)
Average precipitation days (≥ 0.01 in)	3.7	4.2	6.3	8.7	11.1	9.3	9.3	9.3	7.9	6.9	4.3	3.9	85.2
Source: NOAA

== Demographics ==
Historical population
Census	Pop.	Note	%±
1860	217		—
1870	2,778		1,180.2%
1880	2,684		−3.4%
1890	4,502		67.7%
1900	4,695		4.3%
1910	5,598		19.2%
1920	7,533		34.6%
1930	7,407		−1.7%
1940	8,507		14.9%
1950	13,462		58.2%
1960	18,700		38.9%
1970	19,018		1.7%
1980	19,305		1.5%
1990	20,604		6.7%
2000	20,671		0.3%
2010	23,353		13.0%
2020	22,932		−1.8%
2023 (est.)	21,856		−4.7%
U.S. Decennial Census; 2010-2020

=== 2020 census ===
As of the 2020 census, Junction City had a population of 22,932, with 9,104 households and 5,851 families. The population density was 1,986.3 per square mile (766.9/km^{2}). There were 10,920 housing units at an average density of 945.9 per square mile (365.2/km^{2}).

The median age was 31.0 years. 26.5% of residents were under the age of 18, 11.8% were from 18 to 24, 31.0% were from 25 to 44, 20.2% were from 45 to 64, and 10.6% were 65 years of age or older. For every 100 females there were 98.9 males, and for every 100 females age 18 and over there were 95.0 males age 18 and over.

About 99.7% of residents lived in urban areas, while 0.3% lived in rural areas.

Of these households, 34.8% had children under the age of 18 living in them. Married-couple households accounted for 45.5% of all households, 20.3% had a male householder with no spouse or partner present, and 27.3% had a female householder with no spouse or partner present. About 29.2% of all households were made up of individuals, and 8.2% had someone living alone who was 65 years of age or older. The average household size was 2.4 and the average family size was 2.9.

Of these housing units, 16.6% were vacant. The homeowner vacancy rate was 4.7% and the rental vacancy rate was 19.0%.

Racial composition as of the 2020 census
Race	Number	Percent
White	12,593	54.9%
Black or African American	4,643	20.2%
American Indian and Alaska Native	211	0.9%
Asian	872	3.8%
Native Hawaiian and Other Pacific Islander	274	1.2%
Some other race	1,162	5.1%
Two or more races	3,177	13.9%
Hispanic or Latino (of any race)	3,615	15.8%

=== Education and income ===
The 2016–2020 5-year American Community Survey estimates show that the median household income was $52,159 (with a margin of error of +/- $4,413) and the median family income was $60,134 (+/- $4,847). Males had a median income of $37,361 (+/- $3,548) versus $23,329 (+/- $2,488) for females. The median income for those above 16 years old was $30,514 (+/- $2,011). Approximately, 15.4% of families and 14.6% of the population were below the poverty line, including 20.5% of those under the age of 18 and 9.9% of those ages 65 or over. The percent of those with a bachelor's degree or higher was estimated to be 12.8% of the population.

=== 2010 census ===
As of the census of 2010, there were 23,353 people, 9,134 households, and 6,109 families living in the city. The population density was 1,922.1 inhabitants per square mile (742.1/km^{2}). There were 10,480 housing units at an average density of 862.6 per square mile (333.1/km^{2}). The racial makeup of the city was 60.7% White, 22.3% Black, 0.9% Native American, 3.9% Asian, 0.9% Pacific Islander, 4.0% from other races, and 7.3% from two or more races. Hispanic or Latino of any race were 13.0% of the population.

There were 9,134 households, of which 39.6% had children under the age of 18 living with them, 45.9% were married couples living together, 16.4% had a female householder with no husband present, 4.6% had a male householder with no wife present, and 33.1% were non-families. 27.6% of all households were made up of individuals, and 7% had someone living alone who was 65 years of age or older. The average household size was 2.53 and the average family size was 3.07.

The median age in the city was 28.8 years. 29% of residents were under the age of 18; 13% were between the ages of 18 and 24; 30.3% were from 25 to 44; 19.3% were from 45 to 64; and 8.4% were 65 years of age or older. The gender makeup of the city was 48.9% male and 51.1% female.

== Government ==
Junction City has a Commission form of government. The City Manager is responsible for the day-to-day operations of the City and serves at the discretion of the Commission. The City Commission consists of five members who are elected by the registered voters of the City. Each Commissioner serves for either two or four years, depending on the number of votes they received. The mayor is a Commissioner that is "elected" by the other members of the Commission and serves for a minimum two-year term.

== Education ==
The community is served by Geary County USD 475 public school district. There is one public high school in the city, Junction City High School.

There were over 678 new students in the 2009–2010 school year, breaking all records for enrollment in the school district.

== Media ==
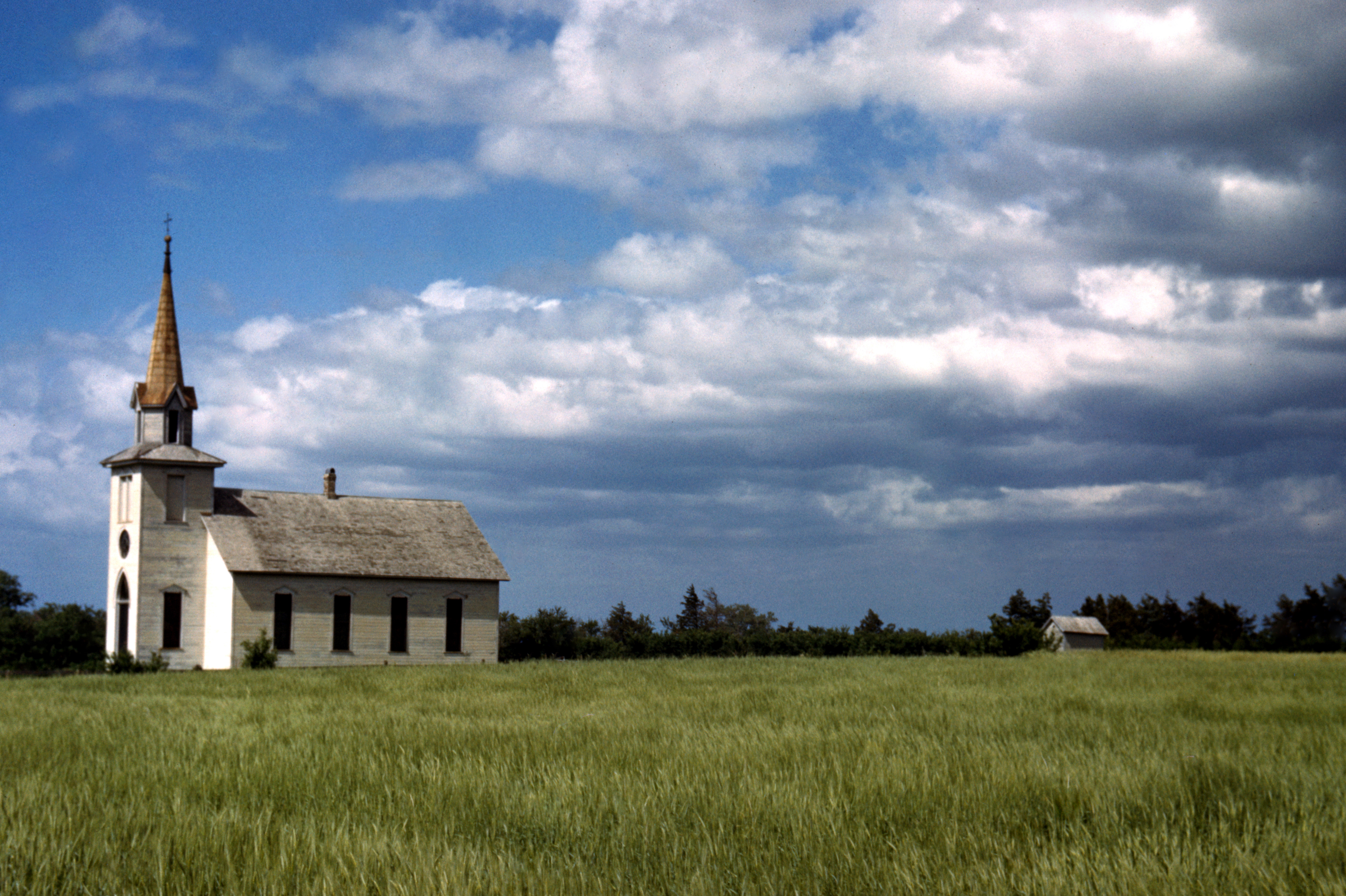
Church near Junction City (1943)

The Junction City Daily Union is the local newspaper, published five days a week.

Three radio stations are licensed to and broadcast from Junction City. KJCK (AM) broadcasts on 1420 AM, playing a News/Talk format; its sister station, KJCK-FM, broadcasts on 97.5 FM, playing a Top 40 format. K222AX is a translator station that rebroadcasts the signal of KJIL, a Christian Contemporary station in Meade, Kansas, on 92.3 FM.

Junction City is in the Topeka, Kansas television market.

== Transportation ==
Greyhound Lines has a bus stop in Junction City. Local transit services are provided by ATA Bus.

== Fiction ==
In Sidney Sheldon's New York Times bestseller Windmills of the Gods, the heroine of the novel is from Junction City. In both the stage and film version of Hedwig and the Angry Inch, the character of Hedwig moves to Junction City after leaving East Germany.

The 13th mission of the video game Fallout Tactics: Brotherhood of Steel takes place in a location based on Junction City.

== Notable people ==
Notable individuals who were born in and/or have lived in Junction City include U.S. Army Maj. Gen. Adna R. Chaffee, Jr., inventor Amanda Jones, playwright Velina Hasu Houston, and wrestler Bobby Lashley.

== See also ==
- St. Xavier High School
- Operation Junction City
- Milford Lake
- Missouri–Kansas–Texas Railroad
