= Wakefield, Kansas =

City in Clay County, Kansas

- City
- Location within Clay County and Kansas

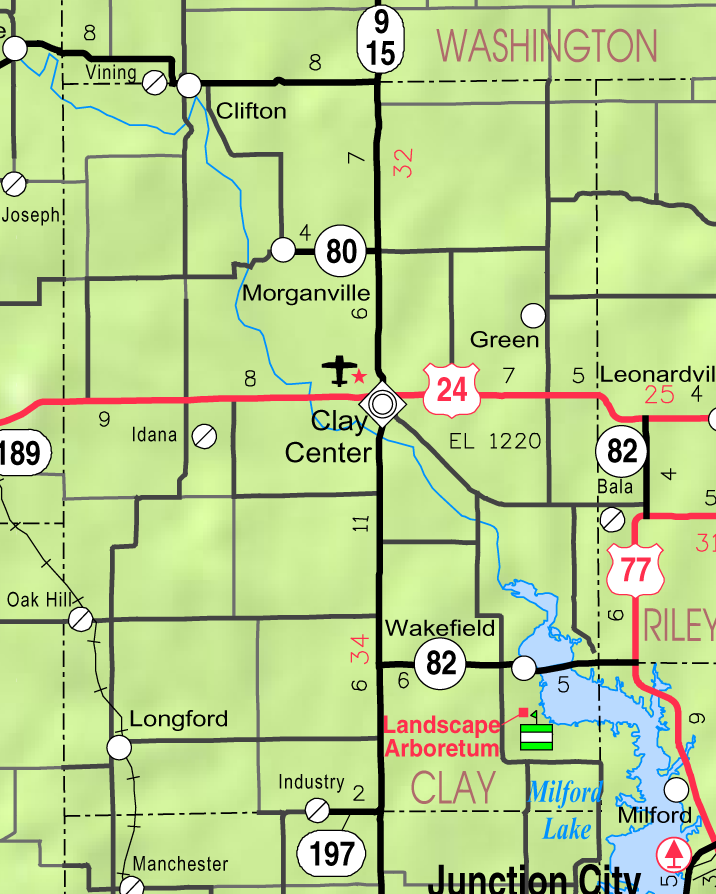
- KDOT map of Clay County (legend)
- Coordinates: 39°12′59″N 97°01′08″W
- Country: United States
- State: Kansas
- County: Clay
- Founded: 1869
- Incorporated: 1887
- Named for: Wakefield, England

Area
  - Total: 0.50 sq mi (1.29 km^{2})
  - Land: 0.50 sq mi (1.29 km^{2})
  - Water: 0 sq mi (0.00 km^{2})
- Elevation: 1,260 ft (380 m)

Population (2020)
  - Total: 858
  - Density: 1,720/sq mi (665/km^{2})
- Time zone: UTC-6 (CST)
  - Summer (DST): UTC-5 (CDT)
- ZIP Code: 67487
- Area code: 785
- FIPS code: 20-74525
- GNIS ID: 2397167
- Website: wakefieldks.com

Wakefield is a city in Clay County, Kansas, United States. As of the 2020 census, the population of the city was 858.

== History ==
Wakefield was founded in 1869. It was named for one of its founders, Rev. Richard Wake, but also because another founder was a native of Wakefield, England. The railroad was built through Wakefield in 1873.

== Geography ==
According to the United States Census Bureau, the city has a total area of 0.50 square miles (1.29 km^{2}), all land.

=== Climate ===
The climate in this area is characterized by hot, humid summers and generally mild to cool winters. According to the Köppen Climate Classification system, Wakefield has a humid subtropical climate, abbreviated "Cfa" on climate maps.

== Demographics ==
Historical population
Census	Pop.	Note	%±
1890	241		—
1900	322		33.6%
1910	514		59.6%
1920	531		3.3%
1930	528		−0.6%
1940	513		−2.8%
1950	591		15.2%
1960	603		2.0%
1970	583		−3.3%
1980	803		37.7%
1990	900		12.1%
2000	838		−6.9%
2010	980		16.9%
2020	858		−12.4%
U.S. Decennial Census

=== 2010 census ===
As of the census of 2010, there were 980 people, 357 households, and 272 families living in the city. The population density was 1,960.0 inhabitants per square mile (756.8/km^{2}). There were 413 housing units at an average density of 826.0 per square mile (318.9/km^{2}). The racial makeup of the city was 94.7% White, 0.4% African American, 0.6% Native American, 0.5% Asian, 0.3% from other races, and 3.5% from two or more races. Hispanic or Latino of any race were 3.5% of the population.

There were 357 households, of which 41.2% had children under the age of 18 living with them, 59.9% were married couples living together, 14.0% had a female householder with no husband present, 2.2% had a male householder with no wife present, and 23.8% were non-families. 21.3% of all households were made up of individuals, and 9.3% had someone living alone who was 65 years of age or older. The average household size was 2.67 and the average family size was 3.08.

The median age in the city was 35.5 years. 28.8% of residents were under the age of 18; 6.4% were between the ages of 18 and 24; 29.7% were from 25 to 44; 20.1% were from 45 to 64; and 15.1% were 65 years of age or older. The gender makeup of the city was 48.4% male and 51.6% female.

=== 2000 census ===
As of the census of 2000, there were 838 people, 323 households, and 231 families living in the city. The population density was 1,774.7 inhabitants per square mile (685.2/km^{2}). There were 362 housing units at an average density of 766.6 per square mile (296.0/km^{2}). The racial makeup of the city was 95.94% White, 0.84% African American, 1.07% Native American, 0.12% Asian, 0.60% from other races, and 1.43% from two or more races. Hispanic or Latino of any race were 1.19% of the population.

There were 323 households, out of which 39.9% had children under the age of 18 living with them, 64.4% were married couples living together, 5.3% had a female householder with no husband present, and 28.2% were non-families. 24.1% of all households were made up of individuals, and 13.6% had someone living alone who was 65 years of age or older. The average household size was 2.59 and the average family size was 3.11.

In the city, the population was spread out, with 29.7% under the age of 18, 6.2% from 18 to 24, 31.5% from 25 to 44, 21.1% from 45 to 64, and 11.5% who were 65 years of age or older. The median age was 35 years. For every 100 females, there were 97.6 males. For every 100 females age 18 and over, there were 93.1 males.

The median income for a household in the city was $41,719, and the median income for a family was $50,526. Males had a median income of $31,875 versus $19,833 for females. The per capita income for the city was $16,939. About 4.2% of families and 9.4% of the population were below the poverty line, including 14.6% of those under age 18 and 7.8% of those age 65 or over.

== Area attractions ==
- Kansas Landscape Arboretum

== Education ==
The community is served by Clay County USD 379 public school district and Wakefield High School. The Wakefield High School mascot is Bombers and the school colors are blue and white. The Wakefield Bombers won the Kansas State High School Boys class 1A Cross Country championship in 1973, 1984 and 1985.

== Notable people ==
- William Avery, Governor of Kansas from 1965 to 1967

== See also ==
- Milford Lake and Milford State Park
