= Dixon and Griffiths Buildings =

Coordinates: 43.6480°N 79.3744°W

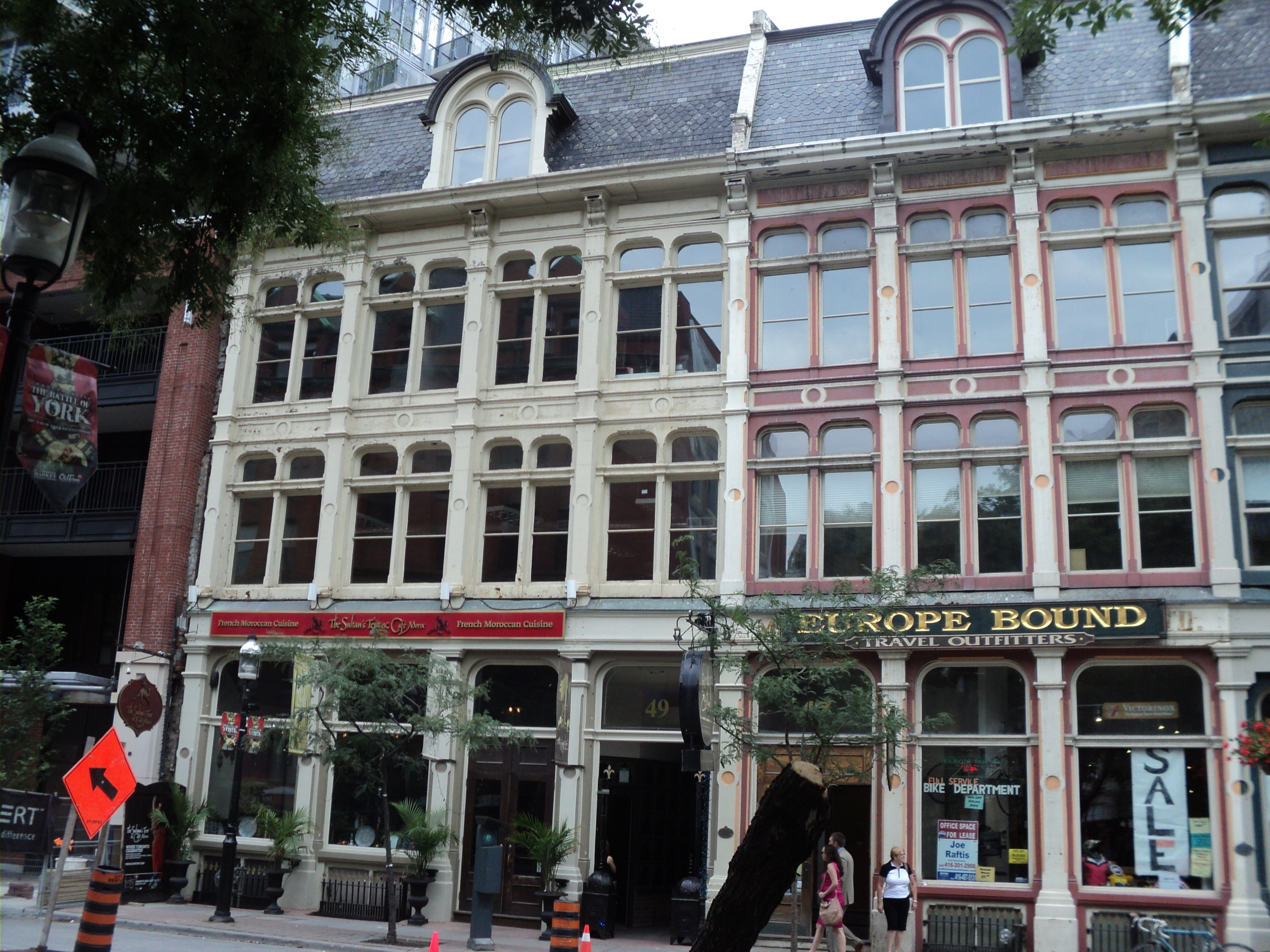
49 Front St. is the white building to the left; 47 Front St. is the red building to the right of the image.

The Dixon Building (number 49) and Griffiths Building (number 47) are parts of a heritage building located on Front Street, Toronto, Ontario. The 3 1/2-storey building is an example of Second Empire architecture and was constructed in 1872-3 according to the designs of Walter Strickland.

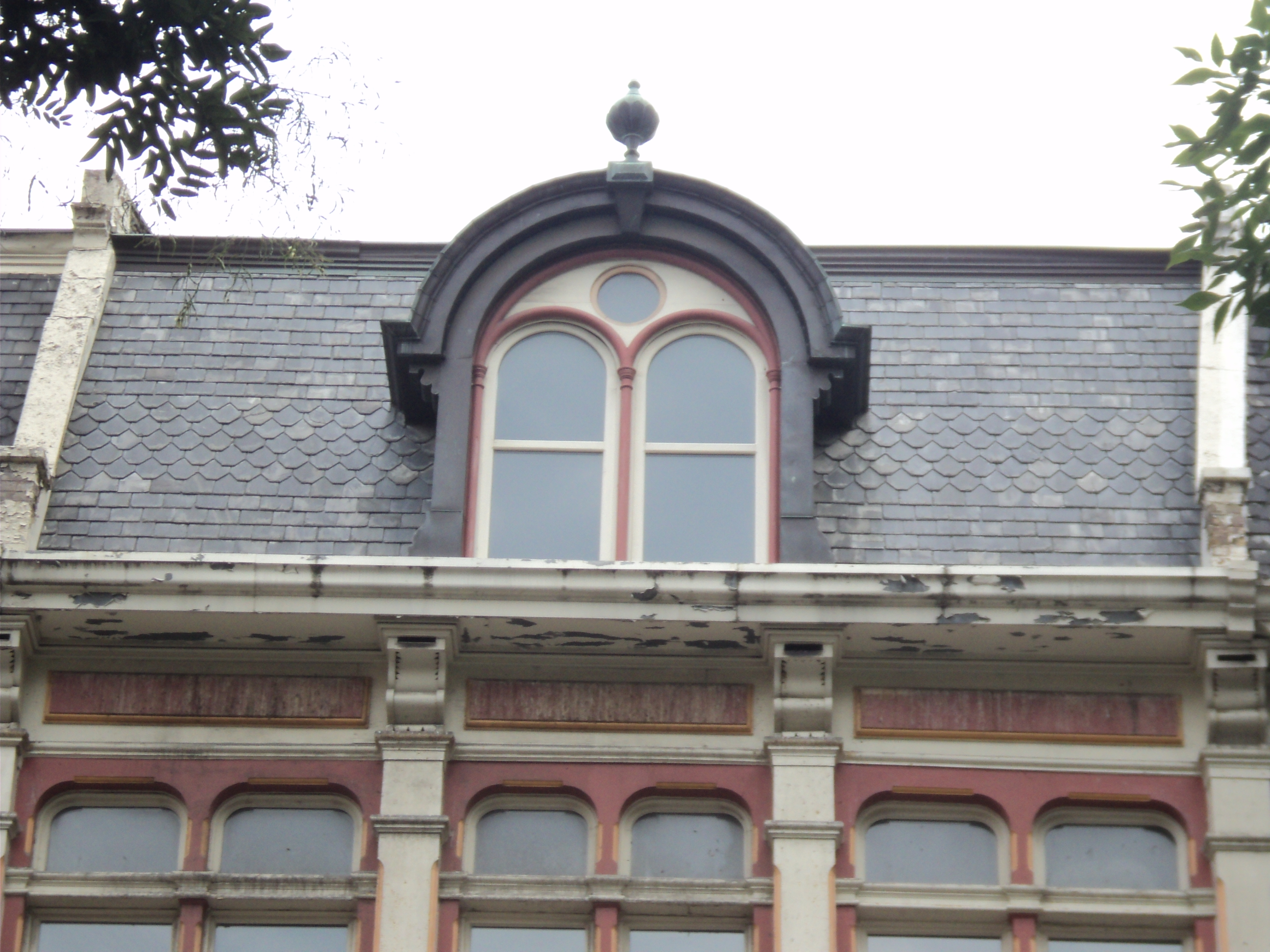
Detail of the roof window at 47 Front St.

The building is thought to be one of the few remaining structures in Ontario with a cast-iron facade. The facade of the building is protected by an Ontario Heritage Trust conservation easement. The property is also designated by the City of Toronto under Part IV of the Ontario Heritage Act (By-law 429-78).
