= Milford, Kansas =

City in Geary County, Kansas

- City
- Location within Geary County and Kansas

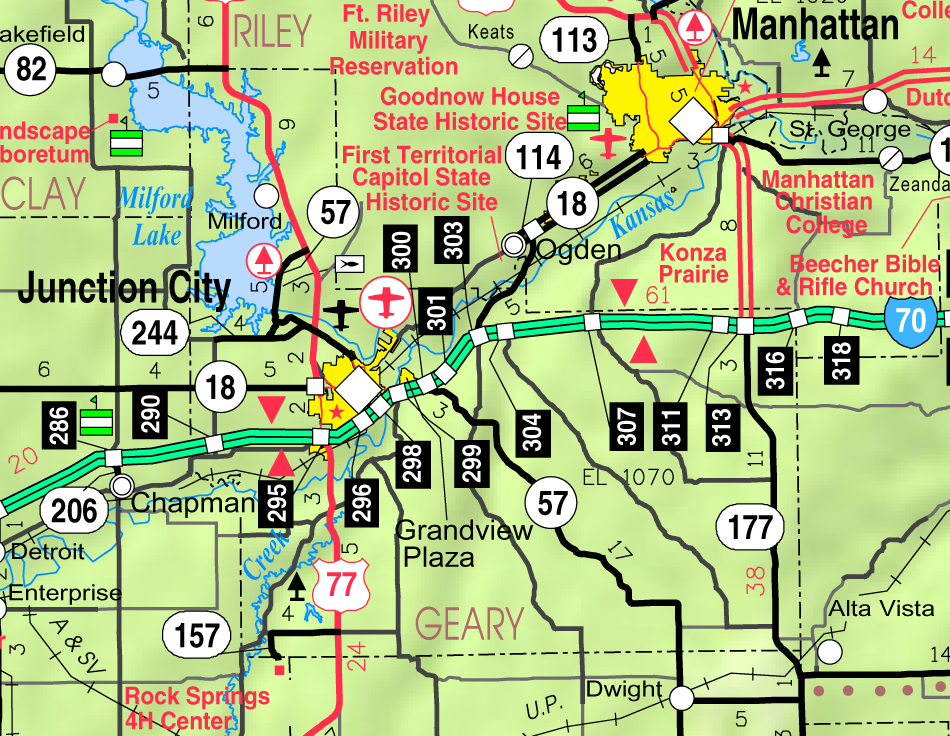
- KDOT map of Geary County (legend)
- Coordinates: 39°10′24″N 96°54′42″W
- Country: United States
- State: Kansas
- County: Geary

Area
  - Total: 0.57 sq mi (1.48 km^{2})
  - Land: 0.57 sq mi (1.48 km^{2})
  - Water: 0 sq mi (0.00 km^{2})
- Elevation: 1,155 ft (352 m)

Population (2020)
  - Total: 408
  - Density: 714/sq mi (276/km^{2})
- Time zone: UTC-6 (CST)
  - Summer (DST): UTC-5 (CDT)
- ZIP Code: 66514
- Area code: 785
- FIPS code: 20-46525
- GNIS ID: 476335
- Website: milford.krwa.net

Milford is a city in Geary County, Kansas, United States. As of the 2020 census, the population of the city was 408.

== History ==
Milford was originally called Bachelder, and under the latter name was laid out in 1855. Milford contained a lumber mill in its early days.

== Geography ==
Milford is located at 39°10′24″N 96°54′42″W (39.173454, -96.911650). According to the United States Census Bureau, the city has a total area of 0.59 square miles (1.53 km^{2}), all land.

=== Climate ===
The climate in this area is characterized by hot, humid summers and generally mild to cool winters. According to the Köppen Climate Classification system, Milford has a humid subtropical climate, abbreviated "Cfa" on climate maps.

== Demographics ==
Historical population
Census	Pop.	Note	%±
1930	300		—
1940	271		−9.7%
1950	284		4.8%
1960	318		12.0%
1970	296		−6.9%
1980	465		57.1%
1990	384		−17.4%
2000	502		30.7%
2010	530		5.6%
2020	408		−23.0%
U.S. Decennial Census

Milford is part of the Manhattan, Kansas Metropolitan Statistical Area.

=== 2020 census ===
The 2020 United States census counted 408 people, 168 households, and 119 families in Milford. The population density was 713.3 per square mile (275.4/km^{2}). There were 261 housing units at an average density of 456.3 per square mile (176.2/km^{2}). The racial makeup was 82.84% (338) white or European American (78.43% non-Hispanic white), 5.15% (21) black or African-American, 0.25% (1) Native American or Alaska Native, 0.49% (2) Asian, 0.0% (0) Pacific Islander or Native Hawaiian, 1.23% (5) from other races, and 10.05% (41) from two or more races. Hispanic or Latino of any race was 8.58% (35) of the population.

Of the 168 households, 33.9% had children under the age of 18; 58.9% were married couples living together; 14.9% had a female householder with no spouse or partner present. 23.2% of households consisted of individuals and 6.5% had someone living alone who was 65 years of age or older. The average household size was 2.0 and the average family size was 2.5. The percent of those with a bachelor's degree or higher was estimated to be 13.2% of the population.

26.2% of the population was under the age of 18, 5.9% from 18 to 24, 27.9% from 25 to 44, 24.3% from 45 to 64, and 15.7% who were 65 years of age or older. The median age was 36.3 years. For every 100 females, there were 82.1 males. For every 100 females ages 18 and older, there were 92.9 males.

The 2016–2020 5-year American Community Survey estimates show that the median household income was $45,875 (with a margin of error of +/- $14,869) and the median family income was $72,917 (+/- $32,548). Males had a median income of $44,250 (+/- $12,861). The median income for those above 16 years old was $38,750 (+/- $23,030). Approximately, 5.3% of families and 8.9% of the population were below the poverty line, including 2.9% of those under the age of 18 and 19.1% of those ages 65 or over.

=== 2010 census ===
As of the census of 2010, there were 530 people, 203 households, and 133 families residing in the city. The population density was 898.3 inhabitants per square mile (346.8/km^{2}). There were 272 housing units at an average density of 461.0 per square mile (178.0/km^{2}). The racial makeup of the city was 83.4% White, 5.7% African American, 0.4% Native American, 0.9% Asian, 0.2% Pacific Islander, 1.3% from other races, and 8.1% from two or more races. Hispanic or Latino of any race were 5.7% of the population.

There were 203 households, of which 36.0% had children under the age of 18 living with them, 54.7% were married couples living together, 8.9% had a female householder with no husband present, 2.0% had a male householder with no wife present, and 34.5% were non-families. 25.1% of all households were made up of individuals, and 4% had someone living alone who was 65 years of age or older. The average household size was 2.61 and the average family size was 3.18.

The median age in the city was 32.8 years. 25.8% of residents were under the age of 18; 11.9% were between the ages of 18 and 24; 30.4% were from 25 to 44; 22.7% were from 45 to 64; and 9.2% were 65 years of age or older. The gender makeup of the city was 54.2% male and 45.8% female.

== Education ==
The community is served by Geary County USD 475 public school district.

Milford High School was closed through school unification. The Milford High School mascot was the Panthers.

== Parks and recreation ==
- Milford Lake and Milford State Park

== Notable people ==
- John R. Brinkley (1885–1942), quack doctor, broadcaster, marketer, independent politician.
- Henry D. Linscott (1894–1973), veteran of both World Wars, later lieutenant general in the Marine Corps.
